= Tolkuse Nature Reserve =

Protected area in Estonia

- Location within Estonia
- Location: Estonia
- Coordinates: 58°10′N 24°40′E
- Area: 810 ha (2,000 acres)
- Established: 2007

Tolkuse Nature Reserve is a nature reserve which is located in Pärnu County, Estonia.

The area of the nature reserve is 810 ha.

The protected area was founded in 2007 to protect valuable habitat types and threatened species in Ilvese and Kõveri village (both in former Surju Parish) and in Laiksaare village (in former Saarde Parish).
