= Tolla =

Tolla may refer to:

== People ==
- Abeba Tolla (born 1977), Ethiopian long-distance runner
- Ada Tolla, Italian architect
- Gerardo di Tolla (born 1943), Peruvian sprinter
- Girma Tolla (born 1975), Ethiopian long-distance runner

== Places ==
- Tolla, Corse-du-Sud, France
- Tolla, Estonia
- Tõlla, Estonia
- Lac de Tolla, Corse-du-Sud, France
