= Siiraku Nature Reserve =

Nature reserve in Estonia

- Location within Estonia
- Location: Estonia
- Coordinates: 58°14′N 24°47′E
- Area: 686 hectares (1,700 acres)
- Established: 2007

Siiraku Nature Reserve is a nature reserve which is located in Pärnu County, Estonia.

The area of the nature reserve is 686 hectares (1,700 acres).

The protected area was founded in 2007 to protect valuable habitat types and threatened species in Kalda and Lähkma village (both in former Surju Parish).
