= Surju Parish =

Former municipality of Estonia

Coordinates: 58°14′N 24°42′E

Surju Parish Surju vald
- Former municipality of Estonia
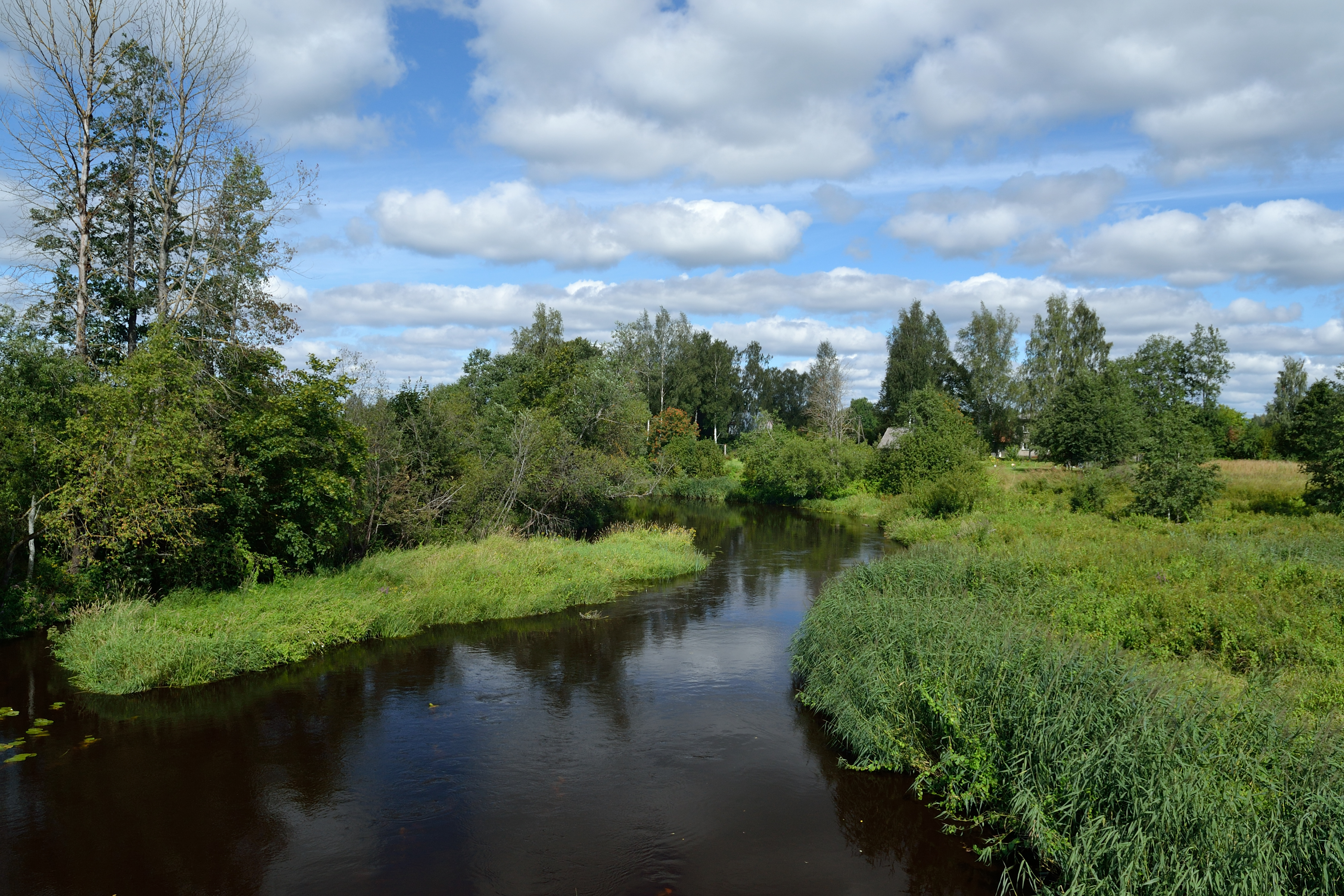
- Reiu river

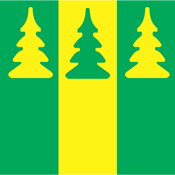
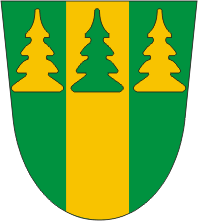
- Flag Coat of arms

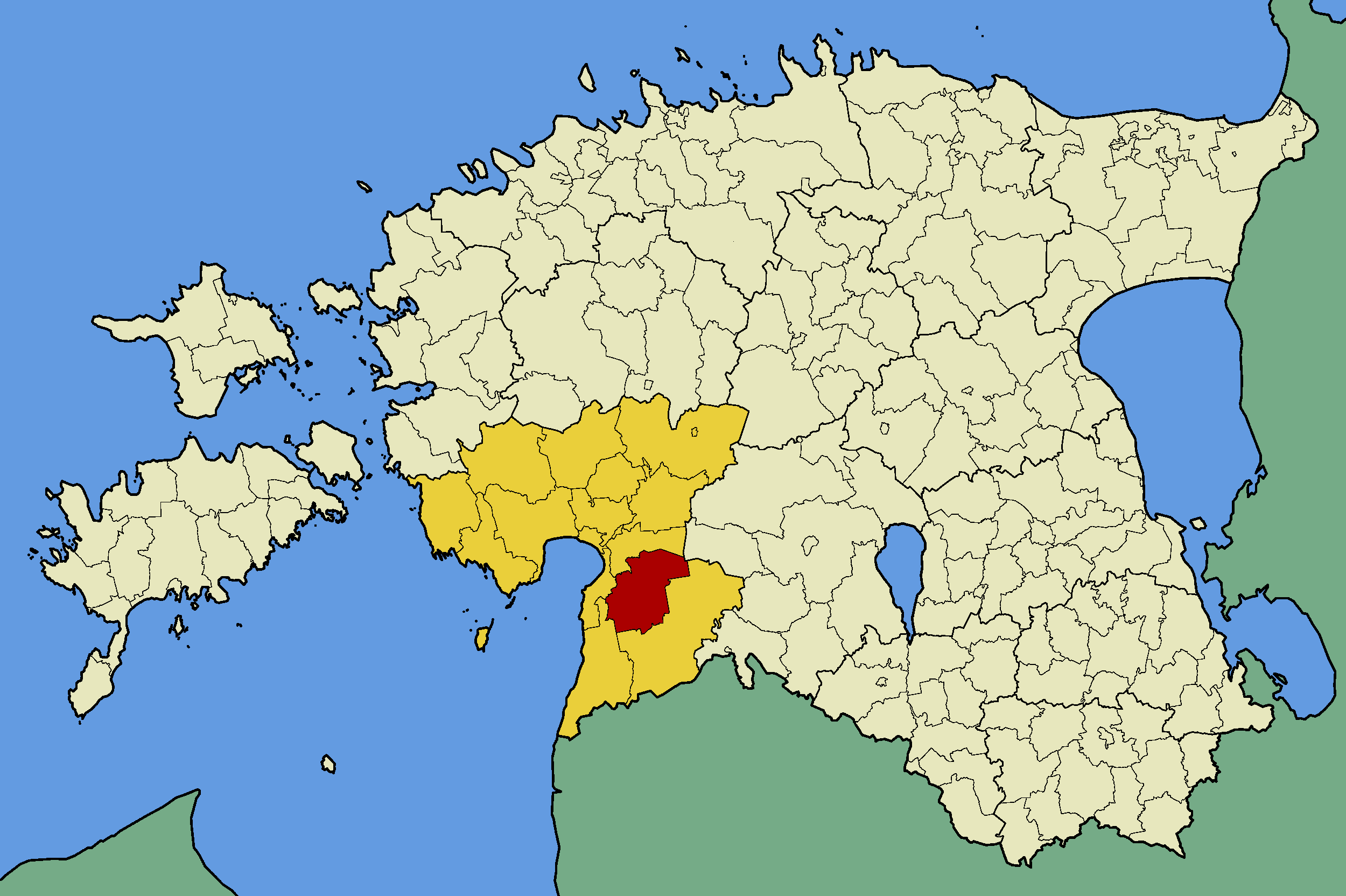
- Surju Parish within Pärnu County.
- Country: Estonia
- County: Pärnu County
- Administrative centre: Surju

Area
  - Total: 357.9 km^{2} (138.2 sq mi)

Population (01.01.2006)
  - Total: 1,015
  - Density: 2.836/km^{2} (7.345/sq mi)
- Website: www.surju.ee

Surju was a municipality located in Pärnu County, one of the 15 counties of Estonia. The municipality was wound up during the 2017 Estonian administrative reforms.

== Settlements ==
Villages

Ilvese - Jaamaküla - Kalda - Kikepera - Kõveri - Lähkma - Metsaääre - Rabaküla - Ristiküla - Saunametsa - Surju
