= Metsaääre Nature Reserve =

Protected area in Estonia

- Location within Estonia
- Location: Estonia
- Coordinates: 58°17′30″N 24°42′00″E
- Area: 160 ha (400 acres)
- Established: 2007

Metsaääre Nature Reserve is a nature reserve which is located in Pärnu County, Estonia.

The area of the nature reserve is 160 ha.

The protected area was founded in 2007 to protect valuable habitat types and threatened species in Jaamaküla and Metsaääre village (both in former Surju Parish).
