= Veelikse =

Veelikse may refer to several places in Estonia:

- Veelikse, Pärnu County, village in Saarde Parish, Pärnu County
- Veelikse, Viljandi County, village in Abja Parish, Viljandi County
