= Uulu-Võiste Landscape Conservation Area =

Protected area in Estonia

- Location within Estonia
- Location: Estonia
- Coordinates: 58°15′00″N 24°32′30″E
- Area: 688 ha (1,700 acres)
- Established: 1958 (2017)

Uulu-Võiste Landscape Conservation Area is a nature park which is located in Pärnu County, Estonia.

The area of the nature park is 688 ha.

The protected area was founded in 1958 to protect Uulu coastal pine forest and Surju coastal forest and its surrounding areas. In 2016, the protected area was designated to the landscape conservation area.
