= Prunelli =

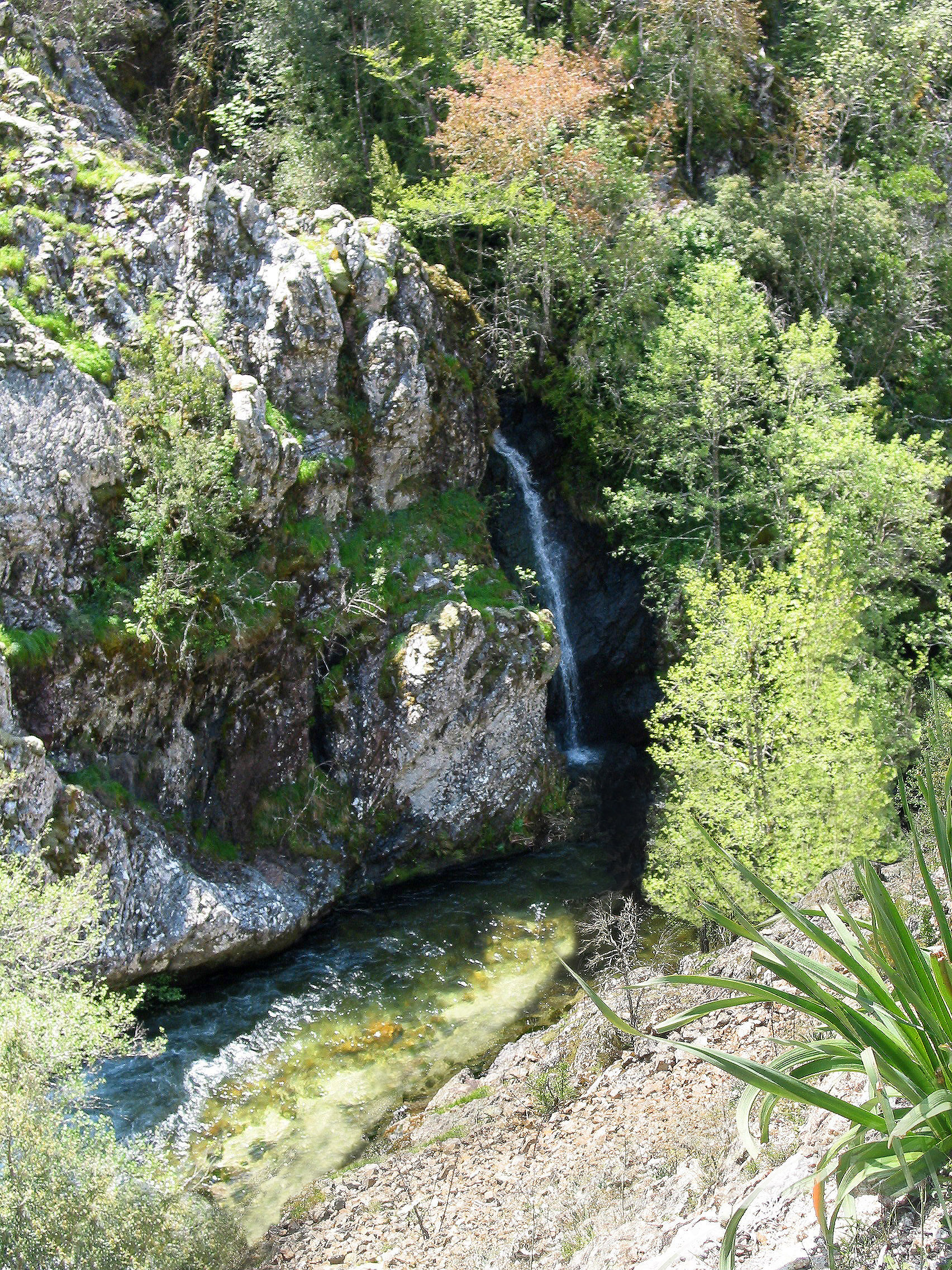
- Small waterfall in the Prunelli gorge above Lake Tolla

- Location within Corsica Location within France

Location
- Country: France
- Region: Corsica
- Department: Corse-du-Sud

Physical characteristics
- Mouth: Mediterranean Sea
  - coordinates: 41.9048°N 8.7979°E
- Length: 44.22 kilometres (27.48 mi)

The Prunelli is a small coastal river in the department of Corse-du-Sud, Corsica, France. It flows into the Golfe d'Ajaccio on the Mediterranean Sea.

== Course ==
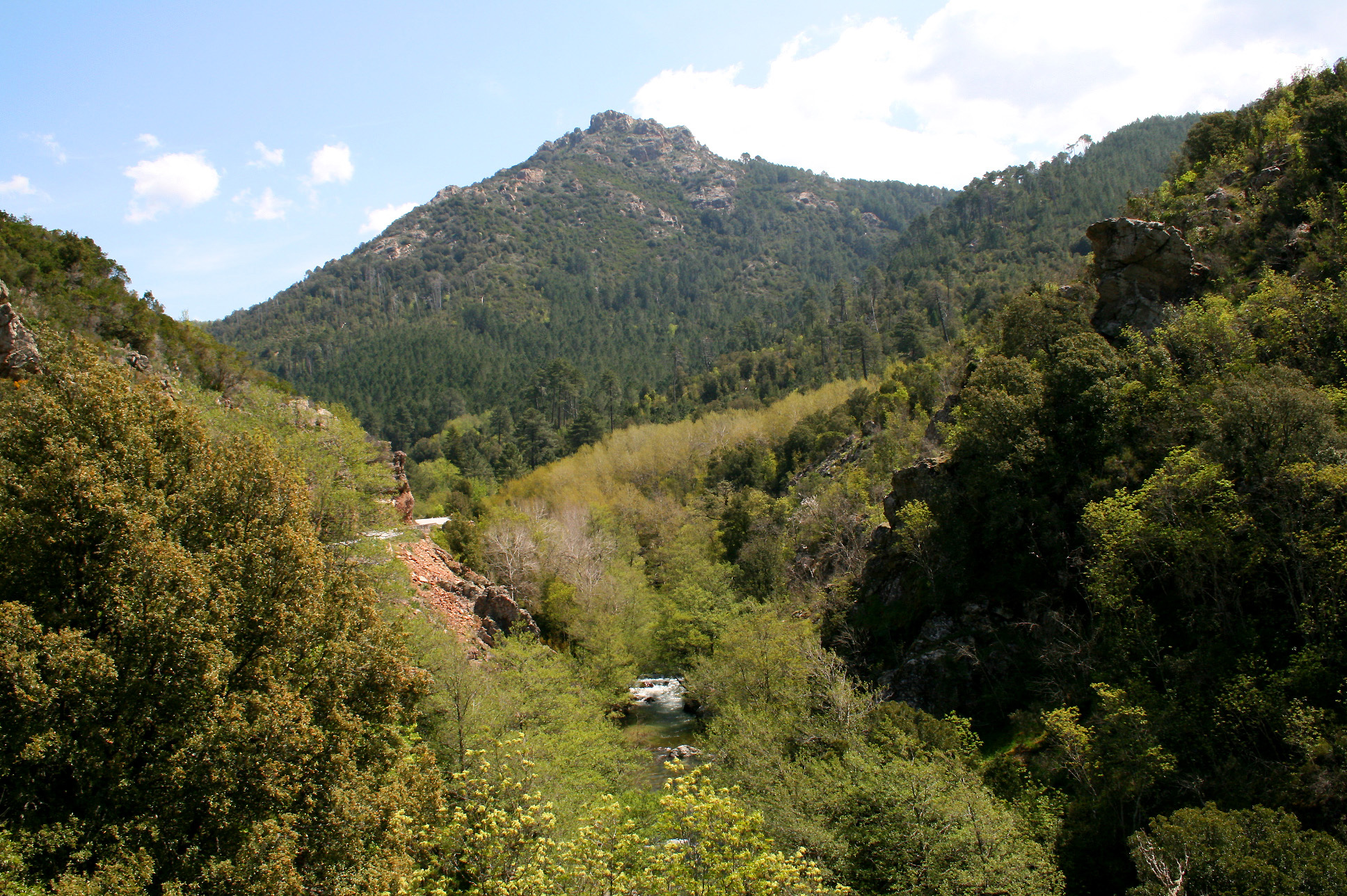
Gorges of the Prunelli

The Prunelli is 44.22 kilometres (27.48 mi) long. It crosses the communes of Ajaccio, Bastelica, Bastelicaccia, Cauro, Eccica-Suarella, Grosseto-Prugna, Ocana and Tolla. The Prunelli originates in Lac de Bracca to the northeast of the 2,250 metres (7,380 ft) Punta Capanella and southeast of the 2,255 metres (7,398 ft) Punta alla Vetta. It flows east, then turns to a southwest direction, flows through Lac de Vitalaca and continues past Bastelica. (Note: Bastelica was the birthplace of the freedom fighter Sampiero Corso in 1497. The Genoese burned down the house where he was born, but it was rebuilt in the 18th century.)

The Prunelli is joined by the Ese river to the east of Tolla. The Ese is crossed by the magnificent Zipitoli Genoese bridge near its confluence with the Prunelli. To the south of Tolla the river is dammed to form the Lac de Tolla. It continues in a southwest direction to enter the sea to the southwest of Bastelicaccia. The lower valley is wide and full of orchards and fields.

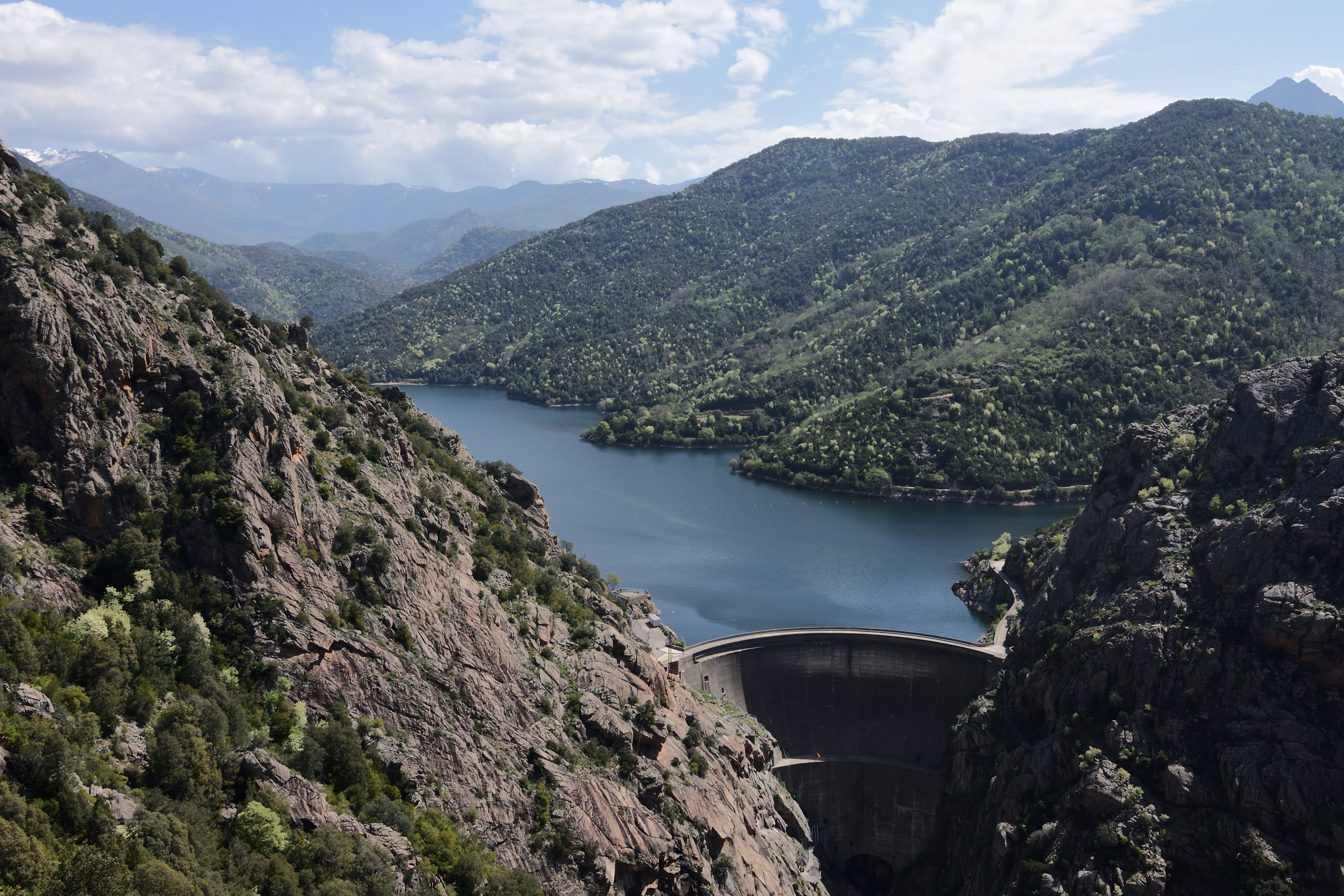
Lac de Tolla and dam

== Lakes ==
Lac de Bracca is one of the highest lakes in Corsica at an altitude of 2,085 metres (6,841 ft). It is 8 metres (26 ft) deep.

Lac de Vitalaca is at an altitude of 1,777 metres (5,830 ft). The lake is surrounded by pozzines, or peat lawns crossed by streams. (Note: Pozzines, from the Corsican language i Pozzi meaning "wells", are acidic peat lawns crossed by winding streams. The oldest pozzines in Corsica formed about 12,000 years ago. They occupy depressions formed by ancient glacial lakes that have been filled by sediment and dead plants, and are found at altitudes between 1,700 and 2,300 metres (5,600 and 7,500 ft).) It is encircled by high mountains and has a dramatic panorama towards the south.

Lac de Tolla is at an altitude of 550 metres (1,800 ft). There is a belvedere on the heights above the lake from which the dam can be seen. The Barrage de Tolla was built between 1958 and 1960, and was commissioned in 1965. It is owned and operated by Électricité de France (EDF). It is a gravity dam 87 metres (285 ft) high and 120 metres (390 ft) long with a crest elevation of 563 metres (1,847 ft). It impounds 34,740,000 cubic metres (1.227×10^{9} cu ft) of water.

== Tributaries ==
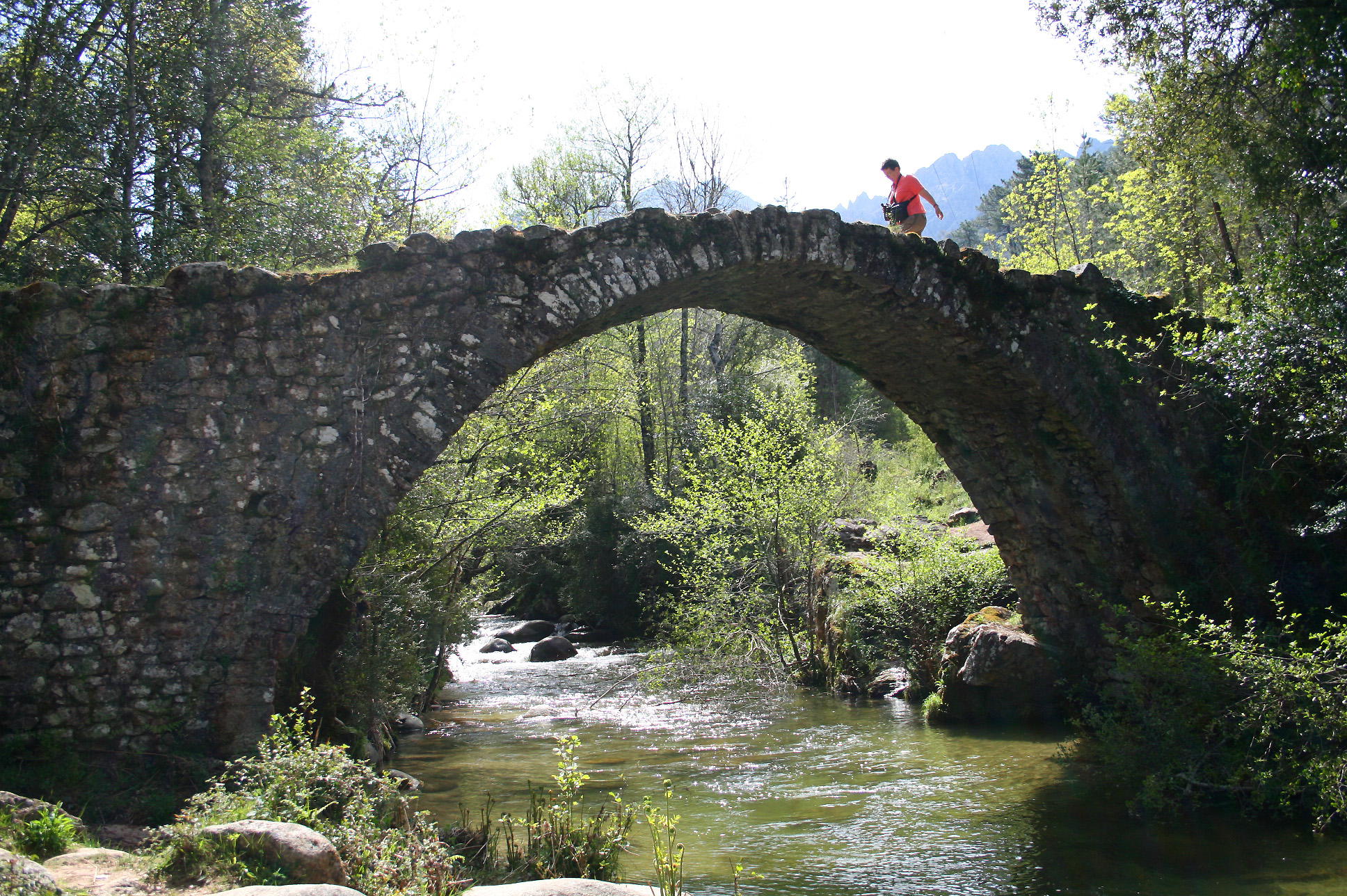
Zipitoli bridge over the Ese

Tributary rivers are the 46 km (29 mi) Gravona and the 21 km (13 mi) Ese. The following streams (ruisseaux) are tributaries of the Prunelli (ordered by length) and sub-tributaries:

- Torrent de Montichi: 13 km (8.1 mi)
  - Barbeccia: 4 km (2.5 mi)
    - Salice: 2 km (1.2 mi)
  - Carnevale: 4 km (2.5 mi)
    - Vaparale: 1 km (0.62 mi)
  - Bestiolo: 3 km (1.9 mi)
  - Acqua di Giovani: 3 km (1.9 mi)
  - Vignola: 2 km (1.2 mi)
- Ruisseau Ajara: 13 km (8.1 mi)
  - Brotolato: 5 km (3.1 mi)
    - Molinello: 3 km (1.9 mi)
      - Agione: 1 km (0.62 mi)
    - Petra Tribiatoja: 1 km (0.62 mi)
  - Tassiccia: 3 km (1.9 mi)
  - Volta: 2 km (1.2 mi)
- Morgone: 11 km (6.8 mi)
  - Orgiale: 6 km (3.7 mi)
  - Ritonda: 5 km (3.1 mi)
    - Frati: 2 km (1.2 mi)
    - Zizoli: 2 km (1.2 mi)
  - Villanacciu: 2 km (1.2 mi)
- Mutuleju: 11 km (6.8 mi)
  - Funtana Griscia: 1 km (0.62 mi)
- Cipetu: 8 km (5.0 mi)
- Labbiolo: 5 km (3.1 mi)
- Scileccia: 5 km (3.1 mi)
- Castellucio: 4 km (2.5 mi)
- Carpinella: 4 km (2.5 mi)
  - Chersichni: 2 km (1.2 mi)
- Traggiettu: 4 km (2.5 mi)
- Agnone: 4 km (2.5 mi)
  - Canale: 3 km (1.9 mi)
- Rughia: 4 km (2.5 mi)
- Arboreta: 3 km (1.9 mi)
- San Martino: 3 km (1.9 mi)
- Mezzaniva: 3 km (1.9 mi)
- Gemma: 3 km (1.9 mi)
- Acqua Grossa: 3 km (1.9 mi)
- Latina: 2 km (1.2 mi)
- Arinella: 2 km (1.2 mi)

== Sources ==
- Corse : Barrage de Tolla (in French), CFBR Comité Français des Barrages et Réservoirs
- Lake Bracca (in French), Ajaccio Intercommunal Tourist Office
- "La vallée du Prunelli", Paradisu (in French)
- "Le lac de Tolla", chibu.fr (in French), 23 August 2009
- "Le lac de Vitalaca", chibu.fr (in French), 2012
- "Le Prunelli : Y84-0400", Sandre (in French)
- "Les Bergeries des Pozzi", Visorando (in French)
- Maurizi, Marie (8 August 2018), "Le lac de Tolla : Une promenade très prisée", Corse net infos (in French)
- "Relation: Le Prunelli (1601681)", OpenStreetMap
