= Lac de Bracca =

- Location within Corsica Location within France
- Location: Corse-du-Sud, Corsica
- Coordinates: 42.05000°N 9.11509°E
- Type: Lake
- Basin countries: France

The Lac de Bracca is a small lake in the Monte Renoso Massif in the Corse-du-Sud department of France.

== Location ==
The Lac de Bracca is in the commune of Bastelica to the east of the 2,250 metres (7,380 ft) Punta Capanella and the 2,255 metres (7,398 ft) Punta all Vetta. It is drained by Prunelli river, which flows west and then south through the Lac de Vitalaca, then southwest past the village of Bastelica and through the Lac de Tolla down to the Golfe d'Ajaccio.

Lake Bracca is one of the highest lakes in Corsica at an altitude of 2,085 metres (6,841 ft). It is 8 metres (26 ft) deep. Hikers can reach the lake via the Col de Scalella. This is a steep and difficult route, recommended only for seasoned hikers.

== See also ==
- List of waterbodies of Corse-du-Sud

== Sources ==
- Lake Bracca (in French), Ajaccio Intercommunal Tourist Office
- Lac de Bracca, Corse VTC
- "Way: Lac de Bracca (178942944)", OpenStreetMap
