= Hendrik Sepp =

Estonian historian (1888–1943)

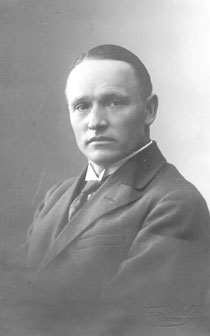
- Born: 23 March 1888; Ristiküla (Saarde Parish), Pärnu County, Governorate of Livonia, Russian Empire
- Died: 5 September 1943 (aged 55); Ipiķi, then part of Generalbezirk Lettland, Reichskommissariat Ostland
- Resting place: Saarde Cemetery
- Citizenship: Estonian
- Known for: Studies of the Great Northern War, especially Narva piiramine ja lahing a. 1700 (1930)

Academic background
- Education: University of Tartu

Academic work
- Discipline: History
- Institutions: University of Tartu

Hendrik Sepp (23 March 1888 – 5 September 1943) was an Estonian historian who taught and held academic appointments in Estonian and Nordic history at the University of Tartu. In 1938, he was appointed to the first membership (1938–1940) of the Estonian Academy of Sciences.

== Early life and education ==
Sepp was born in Ristiküla in Saarde Parish (Pärnu County). He attended the Pärnu Boys' Gymnasium and studied history at the University of Tartu (1909–1913), graduating with the degree cand. hist. He was a member of the Korporatsioon Sakala student fraternal organization.

== Academic career ==
From 1914 to 1917 Sepp worked as a teacher in Samara Governorate (Russian Empire), and from 1919 he was affiliated with the University of Tartu as a research stipendiate in Estonian and Nordic history. Between 1923 and 1931 he lectured and led seminars at the university, and in 1931 he defended a dr. phil. degree with a monograph on the Battle of Narva (1700). He was confirmed as a docent in Estonian and Nordic history in 1931, appointed adjunct professor in 1938, and extraordinary professor in 1942.

== Research ==
Sepp's research focused especially on warfare in the eastern Baltic, including the Great Northern War, and he also published on economic, cultural and social history. The Estonian Academy of Sciences’ biographical note credits him with nearly 300 historical writings.

== Death ==
Sepp died on 5 September 1943, on his brother's farm in Ipiķi (Estonian: Ipiku or Ööbiku), near the Latvian-Estonian border. He is buried in Saarde Cemetery.

== Selected works ==
- Narva piiramine ja lahing a. 1700 (1930).
- (co-editor, with others) Eesti majandusajalugu. I (1937).
- Põhja-Eesti majanduslik olustik XIX sajandi teisel poolel (1938).

== Legacy ==
Since 2013, the Estonian War Museum and the Ministry of Defence have awarded the annual Hendrik Sepp Prize for outstanding publications in Estonian military history. Independent coverage of the prize (and brief biographical context about Sepp) has also appeared in the cultural weekly Sirp.
