= Ese (river) =

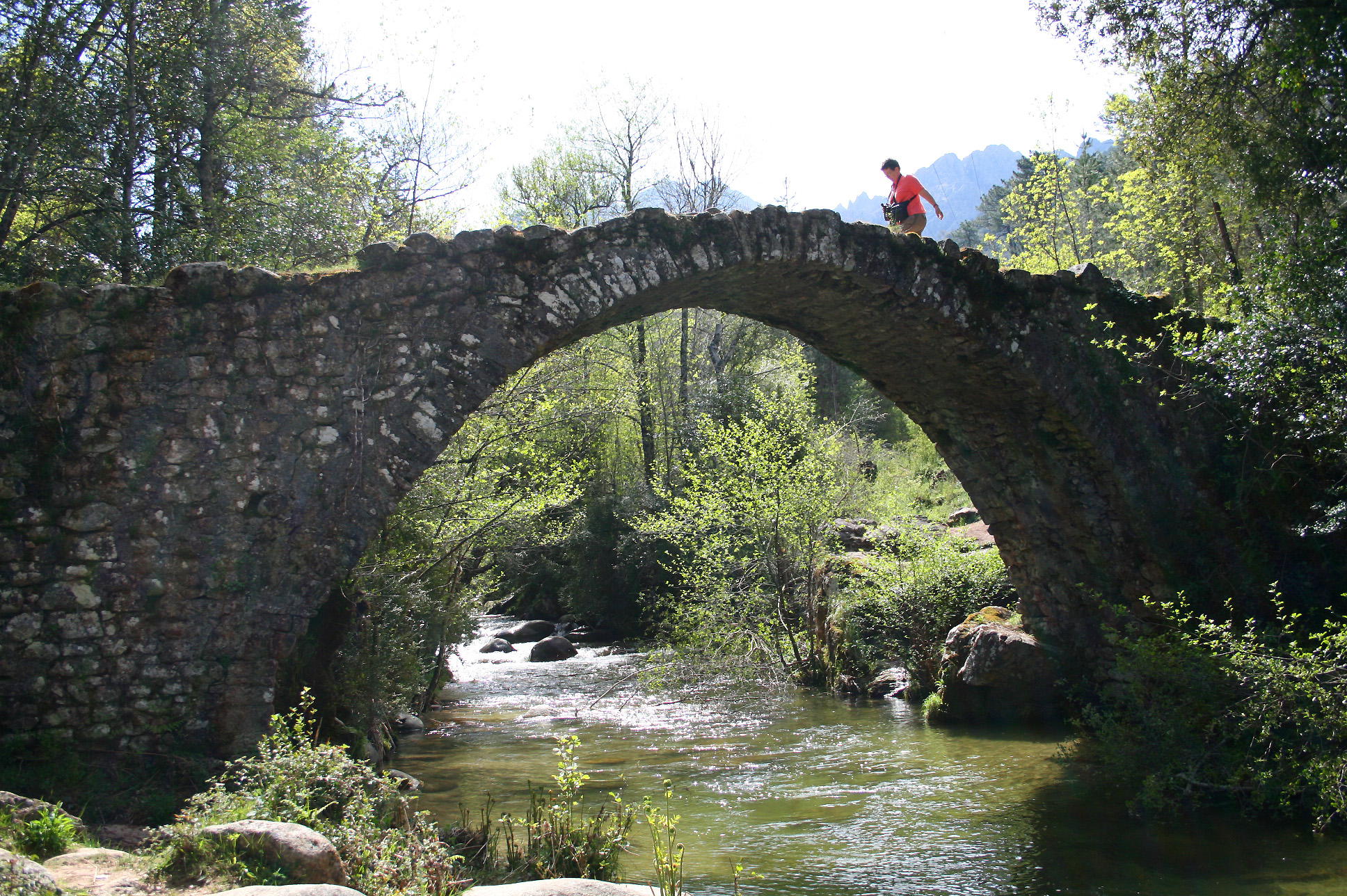
- Zipitoli bridge over the Ese

- Location within Corsica Location within France
- Native name: Rivière d'Ese (French)

Location
- Country: France
- Region: Corsica
- Department: Corse-du-Sud

Physical characteristics
- Mouth: Prunelli
  - coordinates: 41.9699°N 8.9944°E
- Length: 21.03 kilometres (13.07 mi)

Basin features
- Progression: Prunelli→ Mediterranean Sea

The Ese (French: Ese or Rivière d'Ese) is a river in the department of Corse-du-Sud, Corsica, France. It is a tributary of the Prunelli river, which it joins in the Lac de Tolla.

== Course ==
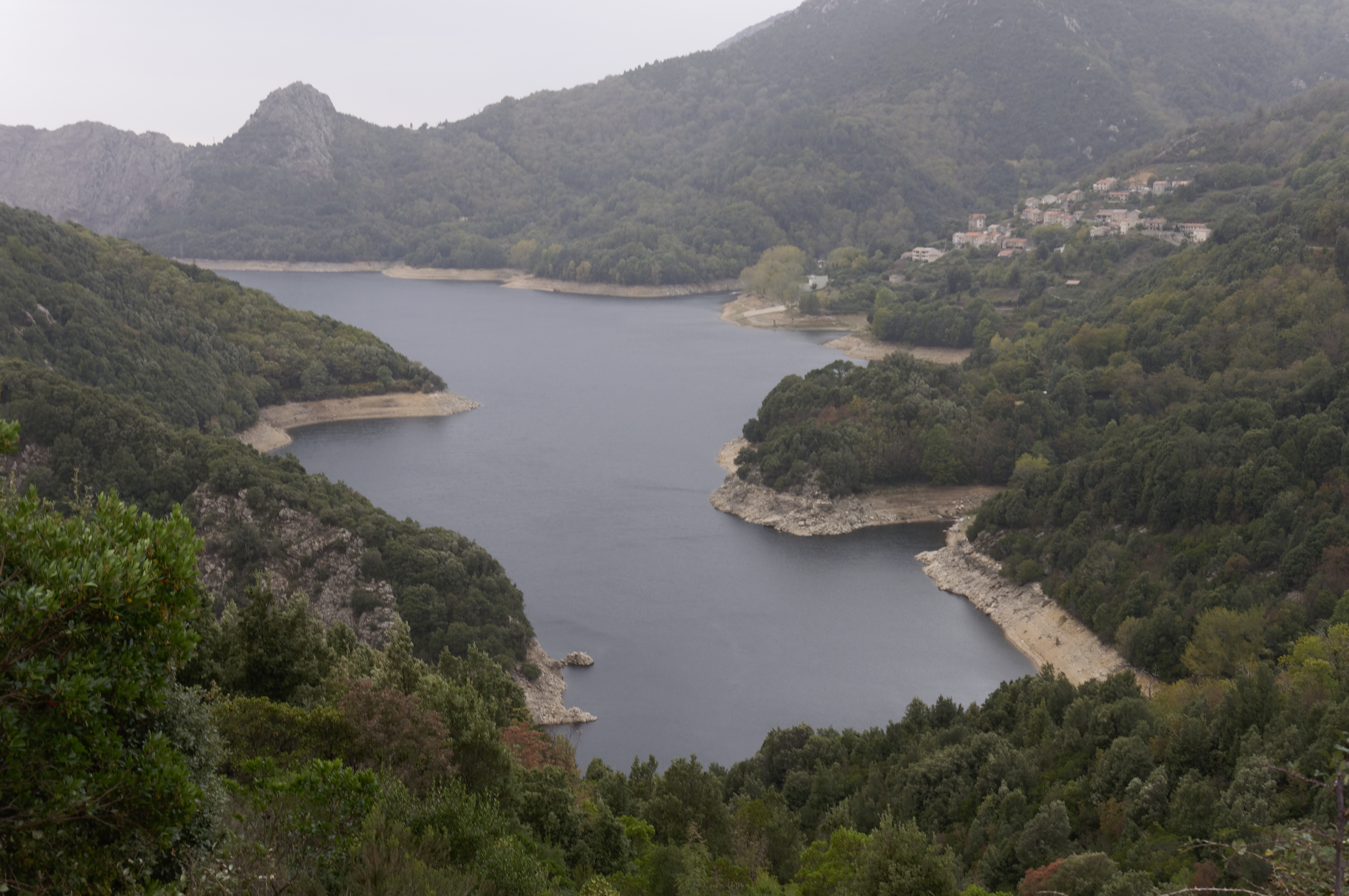
Lac de Tolla, where the Ese joins the Prunelli

The Ese is 21.03 kilometres (13.07 mi) long. It crosses the communes of Bastelica, Ciamannacce, Frasseto, Guitera-les-Bains, Tasso and Tolla. It rises in the commune of Ciamannacce to the north of the 1,950 metres (6,400 ft) Monte Giovanni. It passes a ski resort, the Val d'Ese, in its upper reaches. It flows in a generally southwest direction, then turns west and joins the Prunelli at the head of Lac de Tolla.

The D27a leads from Bastelica for 15 kilometres (9.3 mi) to the Ese plateau at 1,622 metres (5,322 ft). In winter there is a downhill and cross-country ski resort here. If there is no snow, visitors can hike in the Pozzines. (Note: Pozzines, from the Corsican language i Pozzi meaning "wells", are acidic peat lawns crossed by winding streams. The oldest pozzines in Corsica formed about 12,000 years ago. They occupy depressions formed by ancient glacial lakes that have been filled by sediment and dead plants, and are found at altitudes between 1,700 and 2,300 metres (5,600 and 7,500 ft).) Lower down, the Ese is crossed by the magnificent Zipitoli Genoese bridge near its confluence with the Prunelli. The bridge is near the point where the D27 crosses the Ese, and can be reached by a short walk.

The Lac de Tolla is formed by a dam (Barrage de Tolla) on the Prunelli river. The Ruisseau d'Agnone and the Ese River also empty into the lake. It is in the commune of Tolla just south of the village of Tolla. Lake Tolla is at an altitude of 550 metres (1,800 ft).

== Tributaries ==
The following streams (ruisseaux) are tributaries of the Ese (ordered by length):

- Calderanolla: 3 km (1.9 mi)
- Majalei: 3 km (1.9 mi)
- Catagna: 2 km (1.2 mi)
- Pisciancone: 2 km (1.2 mi)
- Bottaggio: 2 km (1.2 mi)
- Piscia: 2 km (1.2 mi)
- Biettajo: 1 km (0.62 mi)
- l'Imbuto: 1 km (0.62 mi)
- Revorgeto: 1 km (0.62 mi)
- Particacceto: 1 km (0.62 mi)
- Paratella: 1 km (0.62 mi)
- Chiova: 1 km (0.62 mi)
- Campolongo: 1 km (0.62 mi)

== Sources ==
- "La vallée du Prunelli", Paradisu (in French)
- "Le lac de Tolla", chibu.fr (in French), 23 August 2009
- "Les Bergeries des Pozzi", Visorando (in French)
- "Relation: Rivière d'Ese (8479190)", OpenStreetMap
- "Rivière d'Ese", Sandre (in French)
- "Way: Lac de Tolla (173091909)", OpenStreetMap
