= Allikukivi Landscape Conservation Area =

Protected area in Estonia

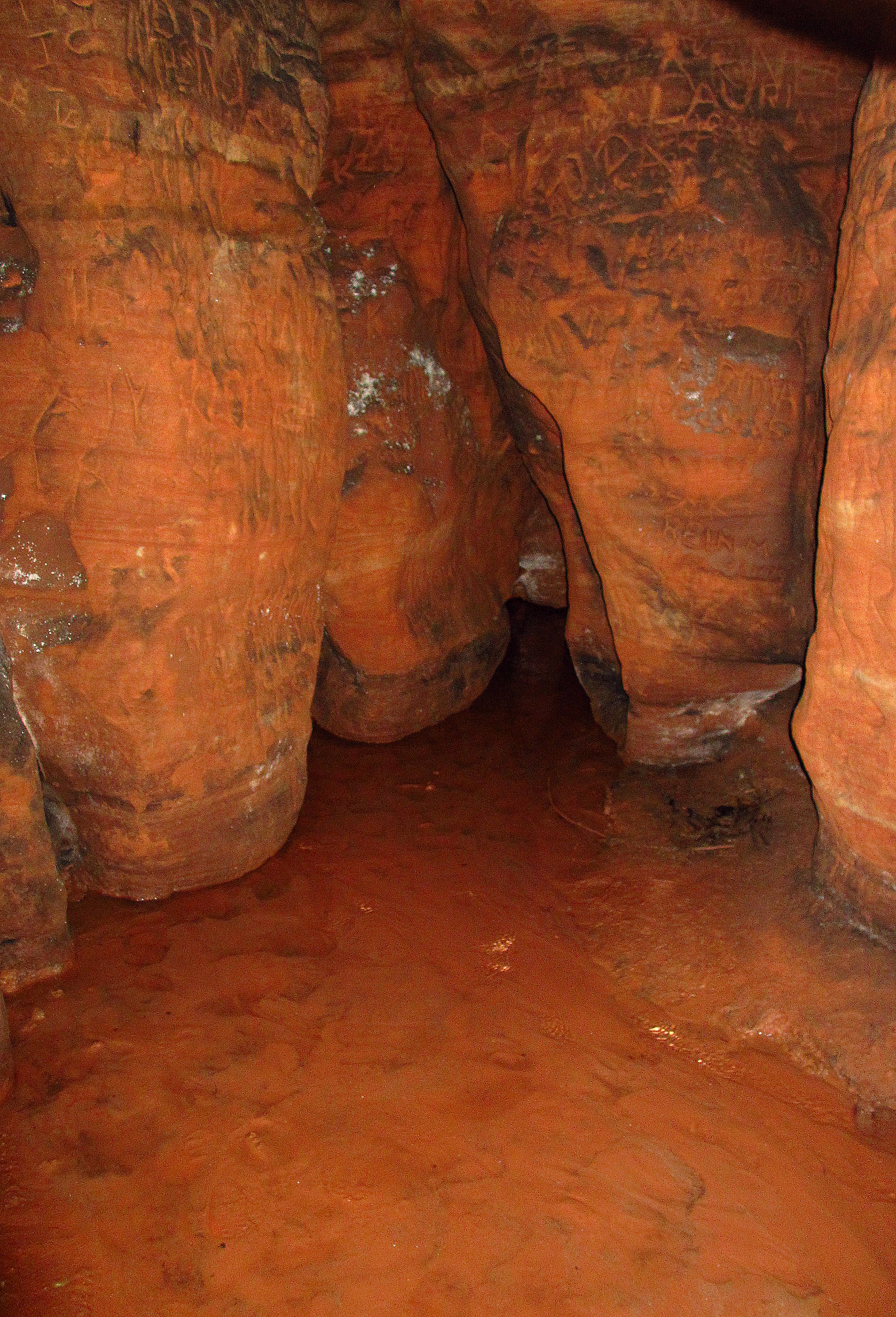

- Location within Estonia
- Location: Estonia
- Coordinates: 58°09′20″N 25°00′40″E
- Area: 240 hectares (590 acres)
- Established: 2017

Allikukivi Landscape Conservation Area is a nature park situated in Pärnu County, Estonia.

Its area is 240 hectares (590 acres).

The protected area was designated in 2017, to protect Allikukivi Ancient Valley and its surrounding areas.
