= Hendrik Toompere =

Hendrik Toompere may refer to:

- Hendrik Toompere Sr. (1946–2008), Estonian actor
- Hendrik Toompere Jr. (born 1965), Estonian actor
- Hendrik Toompere Jr. Jr. (born 1985), Estonian actor
