= Kosemäe Landscape Conservation Area =

Protected area in Estonia

- Location within Estonia
- Location: Estonia
- Coordinates: 58°14′54″N 25°08′56″E
- Area: 47 ha (120 acres)
- Established: (1964) 2016

Kosemäe Landscape Conservation Area is a nature park situated in Pärnu County, Estonia.

Its area is 47 ha.

The protected area was designated in 1964 to protect the forests and landscapes near Kanaküla. In 2016, the protected area was redesigned to the landscape conservation area.
