= Reinu =

Reinu may refer to several places in Estonia:

- Reinu, Tartu County, village in Tartu Parish, Tartu County
- Reinu, Pärnu County, village in Saarde Parish, Pärnu County
