= Lähkma Nature Reserve =

Protected area in Estonia

- Location within Estonia
- Location: Estonia
- Coordinates: 58°16′30″N 24°50′00″E
- Area: 103 ha (250 acres)
- Established: 2007

Lähkma Nature Reserve is a nature reserve which is located in Pärnu County, Estonia.

The area of the nature reserve is 103 ha.

The protected area was founded in 2007 to protect valuable habitat types and threatened species in Kikepera village (former Surju Parish).
