= Soo-otsa Nature Reserve =

Protected area in Estonia

- Location within Estonia
- Location: Estonia
- Coordinates: 58°20′N 24°53′E
- Area: 737 ha (1,820 acres)
- Established: 2007

Soo-otsa Nature Reserve is a nature reserve which is located in Pärnu County, Estonia.

The area of the nature reserve is 737 ha.

The protected area was founded in 2007 to protect valuable habitat types and threatened species in Kikepera village (former Surju Parish).
