= Lodja, Estonia =

Village in Estonia

Lodja
- Village
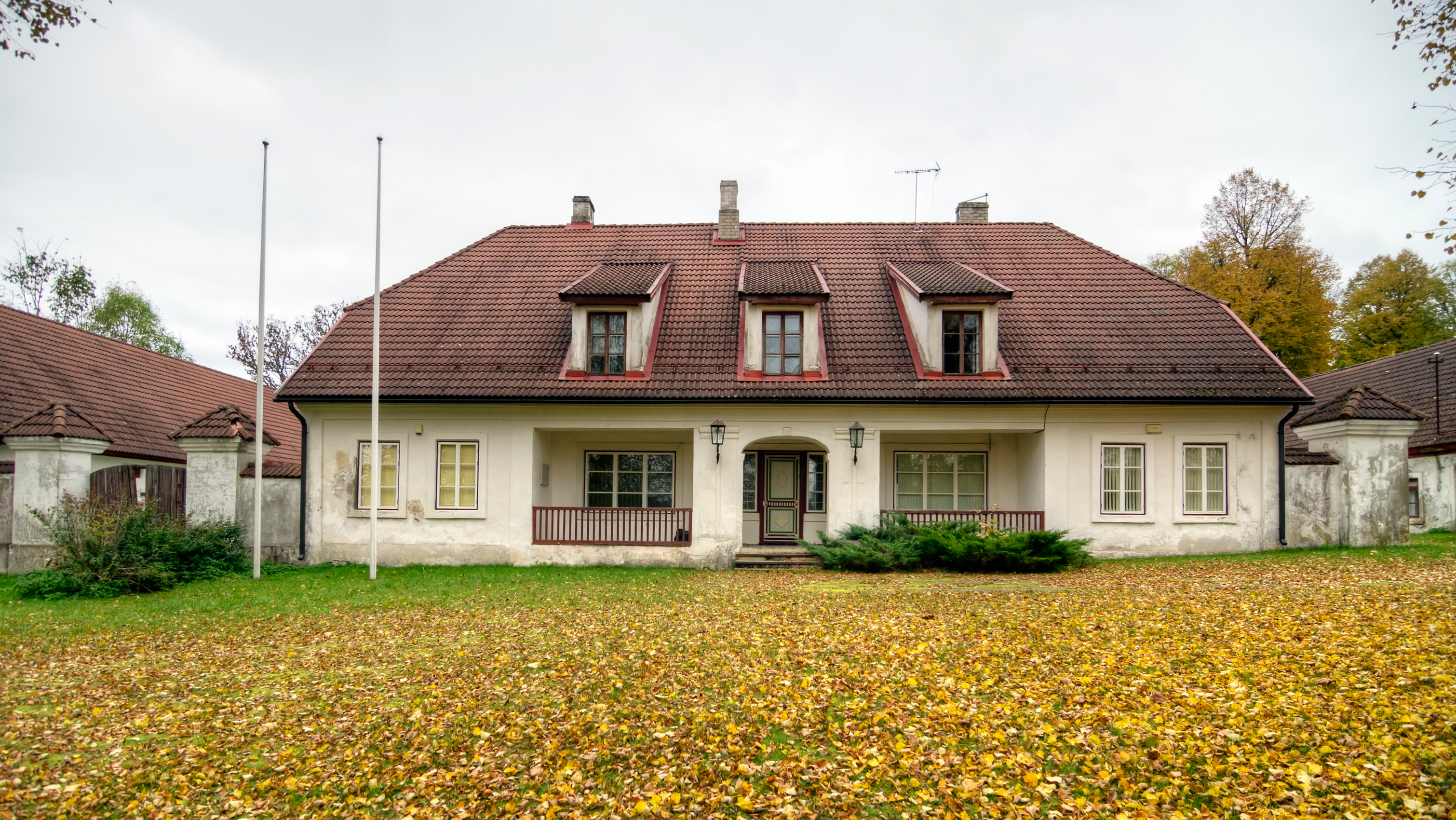
- Former Lodja post station

- Location in Estonia
- Coordinates: 58°09′33″N 24°52′37″E
- Country: Estonia
- County: Pärnu County
- Municipality: Saarde Parish

Lodja is a village in Saarde Parish, Pärnu County, in southwestern Estonia.
