= Tuuliku =

Village in Estonia

Coordinates: 57°58′N 24°43′E

- Village
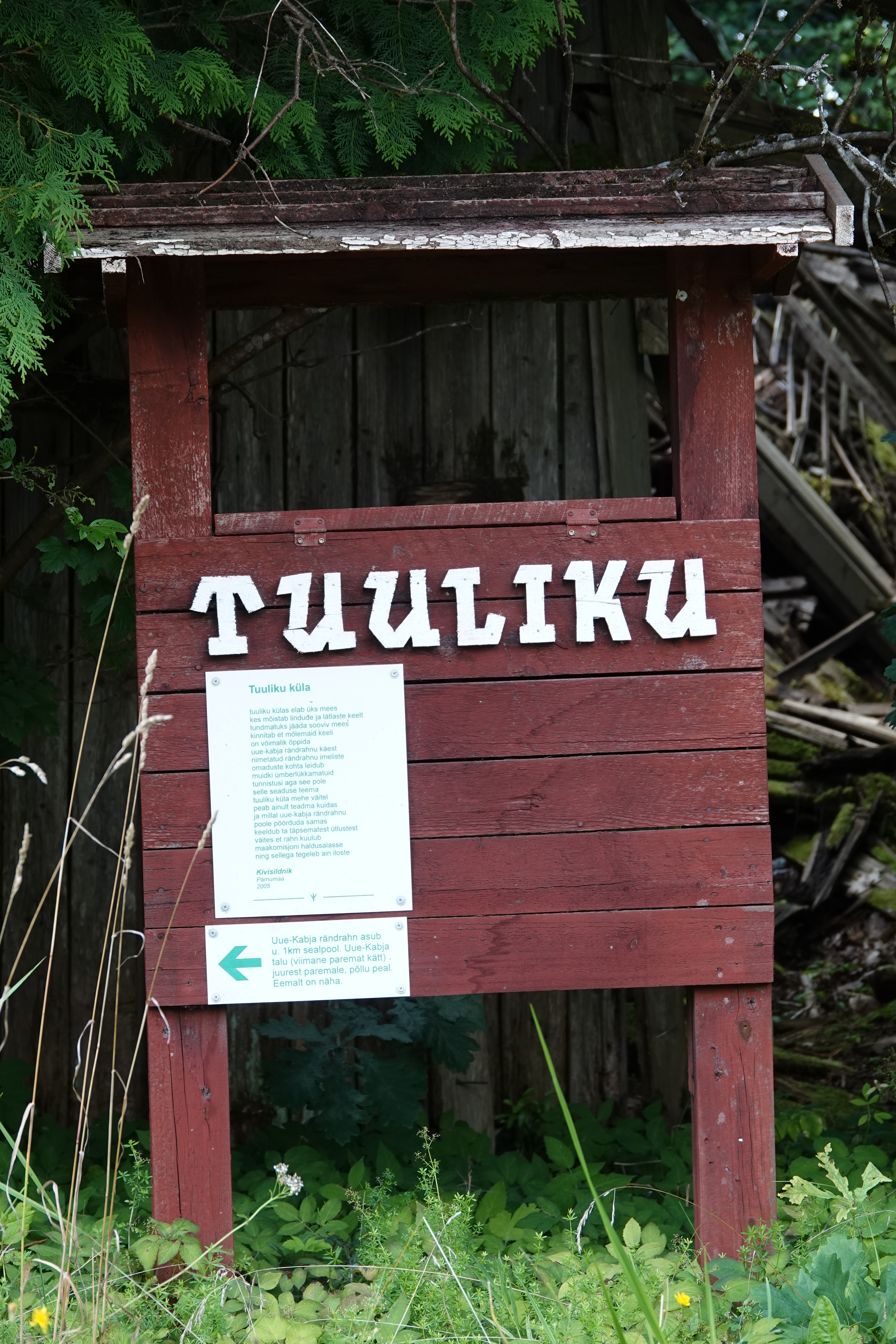
- Tuuliku village notice board
- Interactive map of Tuuliku
- Country: Estonia
- County: Pärnu County
- Parish: Saarde Parish
- Time zone: UTC+2 (EET)
  - Summer (DST): UTC+3 (EEST)

Tuuliku is a village in Saarde Parish, Pärnu County in southwestern Estonia.
