= Lanksaare =

Village in Estonia

- Village
- Location in Estonia
- Coordinates: 58°00′47″N 24°48′00″E
- Country: Estonia
- County: Pärnu County
- Municipality: Saarde Parish

Population (2011 Census)
  - Total: 11

Lanksaare is a village in Saarde Parish, Pärnu County in southwestern Estonia, next to the border with Latvia.

Most of the village's territory is covered by the Sookuninga Nature Reserve.

As of the 2011 census, the settlement's population was 11.
