= Marana, Estonia =

Village in Estonia

Marana
- Village
- Location in Estonia
- Coordinates: 58°09′44″N 24°56′02″E
- Country: Estonia
- County: Pärnu County
- Municipality: Saarde Parish

Marana is a village in Saarde Parish, Pärnu County, in southwestern Estonia.
