= Sigaste =

Village in Estonia

Coordinates: 58°11′N 24°54′E

- Village
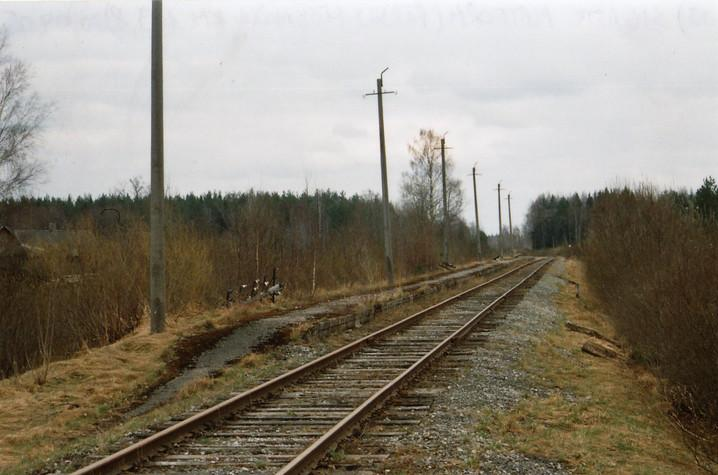
- The discontinued Sigaste railway station
- Interactive map of Sigaste
- Country: Estonia
- County: Pärnu County
- Parish: Saarde Parish
- Time zone: UTC+2 (EET)
  - Summer (DST): UTC+3 (EEST)

Sigaste is a village in Saarde Parish, Pärnu County in southwestern Estonia.
