= Siim Sellis =

Estonian cross-country skier (born 1987)

Personal information
- Born: 5 May 1987 (age 39) Tali, Estonia

Sport
- Sport: Skiing

Siim Sellis (born 5 May 1987 in Tali) is an Estonian cross-country skier.

Sellis competed at the 2014 Winter Olympics for Estonia. He placed 59th in the qualifying round in the sprint, failing to advance to the knockout stages.

Sellis made his World Cup debut in January 2006. As of April 2014, his best finish is 10th, in a classical sprint race at Lahti in 2011–12. His best World Cup overall finish is 118th, in 2011–12. His best World Cup finish in a discipline is 67th, in the 2011-12 sprint.
