= Leipste =

Village in Estonia

Coordinates: 58°08′N 24°59′E

- Village
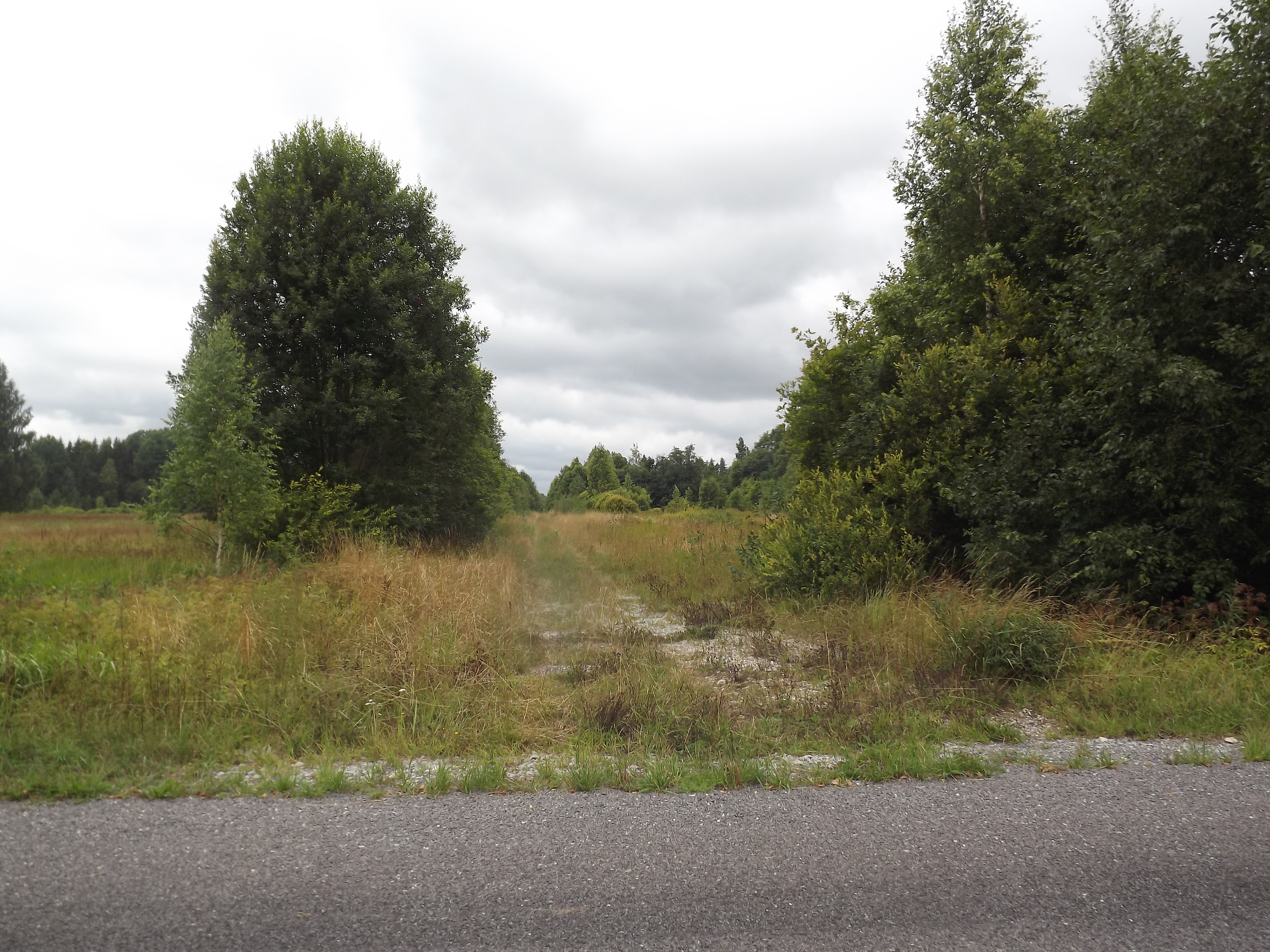
- The discontinued Tihemetsa railway stop near Leipste
- Interactive map of Leipste
- Country: Estonia
- County: Pärnu County
- Parish: Saarde Parish
- Time zone: UTC+2 (EET)
  - Summer (DST): UTC+3 (EEST)

Leipste is a village in Saarde Parish, Pärnu County in southwestern Estonia.
