= Karl Pallo =

New Zealand importer, manufacturing engineer, and businessman

Karl Pallo (1896–1986) was a New Zealand importer, manufacturing engineer and businessman. He was born in Reinu, Estonia in 1896. He was an early supplier of petrol pumps to airports and became a manufacturer of pumps for service stations. The pumps featured an innovative design including a dial that showed the amount of petrol delivered, easing the use of pumps for consumers.
