= Väljaküla, Pärnu County =

Village in Estonia

Coordinates: 58°10′26″N 25°02′03″E

- Village
- Interactive map of Väljaküla, Pärnu County
- Country: Estonia
- County: Pärnu County
- Parish: Saarde Parish
- Time zone: UTC+2 (EET)
  - Summer (DST): UTC+3 (EEST)

Väljaküla is a village in Saarde Parish, Pärnu County in southwestern Estonia.
