= Saunametsa =

Village in Estonia

Coordinates: 58°15′57″N 24°52′47″E

- Village
- Interactive map of Saunametsa
- Country: Estonia
- County: Pärnu County
- Parish: Saarde Parish
- Time zone: UTC+2 (EET)
  - Summer (DST): UTC+3 (EEST)

Saunametsa is a village in Saarde Parish, Pärnu County in southwestern Estonia. Prior to the administrative reforms of local governments in 2017, it belonged to Surju Parish
