= Jaamaküla =

Village in Estonia

Coordinates: 58°15′N 24°47′E

- Village
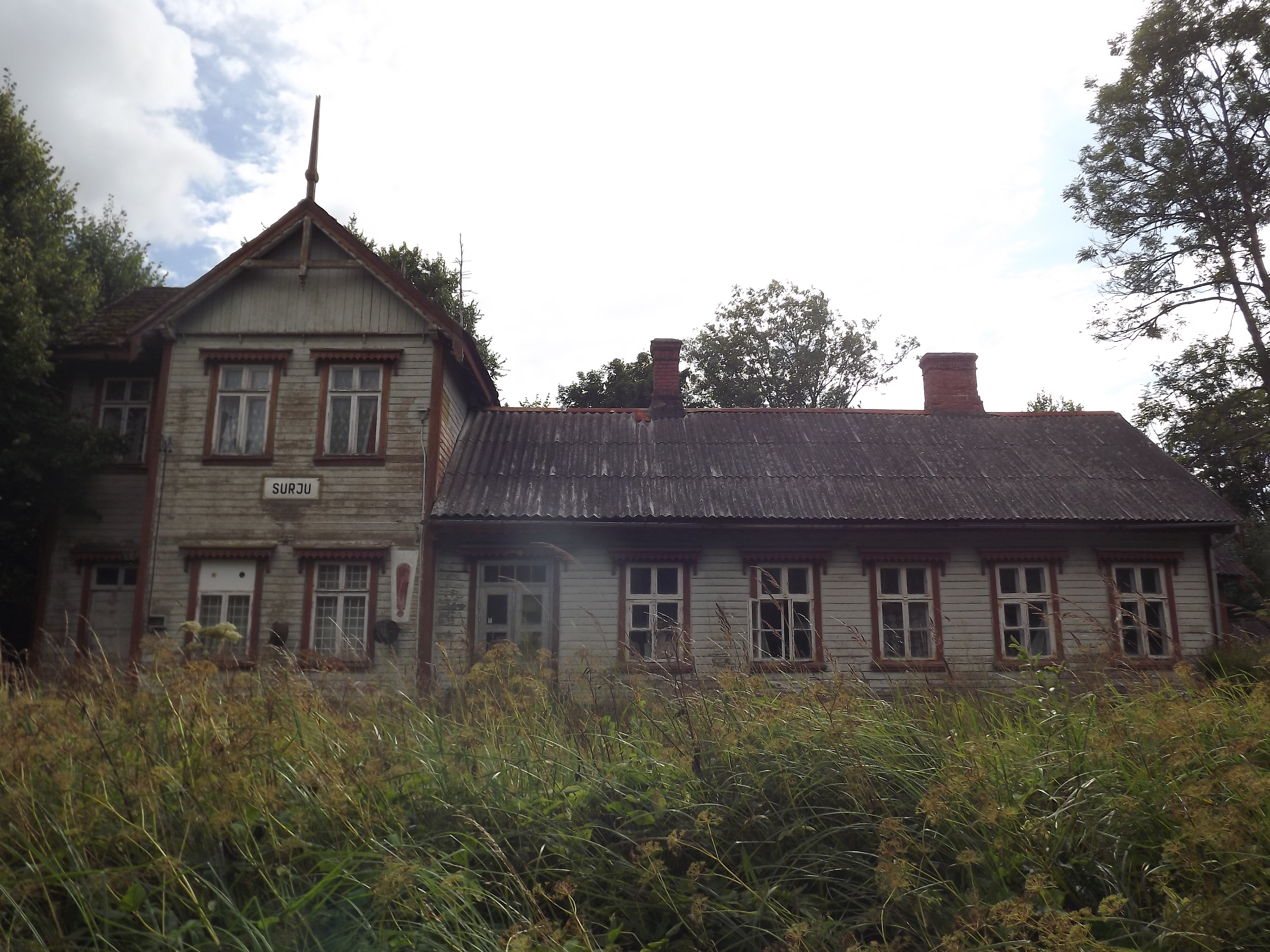
- The former Surju railway station in Jaamaküla
- Interactive map of Jaamaküla
- Country: Estonia
- County: Pärnu County
- Parish: Saarde Parish
- Time zone: UTC+2 (EET)
  - Summer (DST): UTC+3 (EEST)

Jaamaküla is a village in Saarde Parish, Pärnu County in southwestern Estonia. Prior to the administrative reforms of local governments in 2017, it was part of the Surju Parish municipality.
