= Ura River, Estonia =

River in Pärnu County, Estonia

Ura River
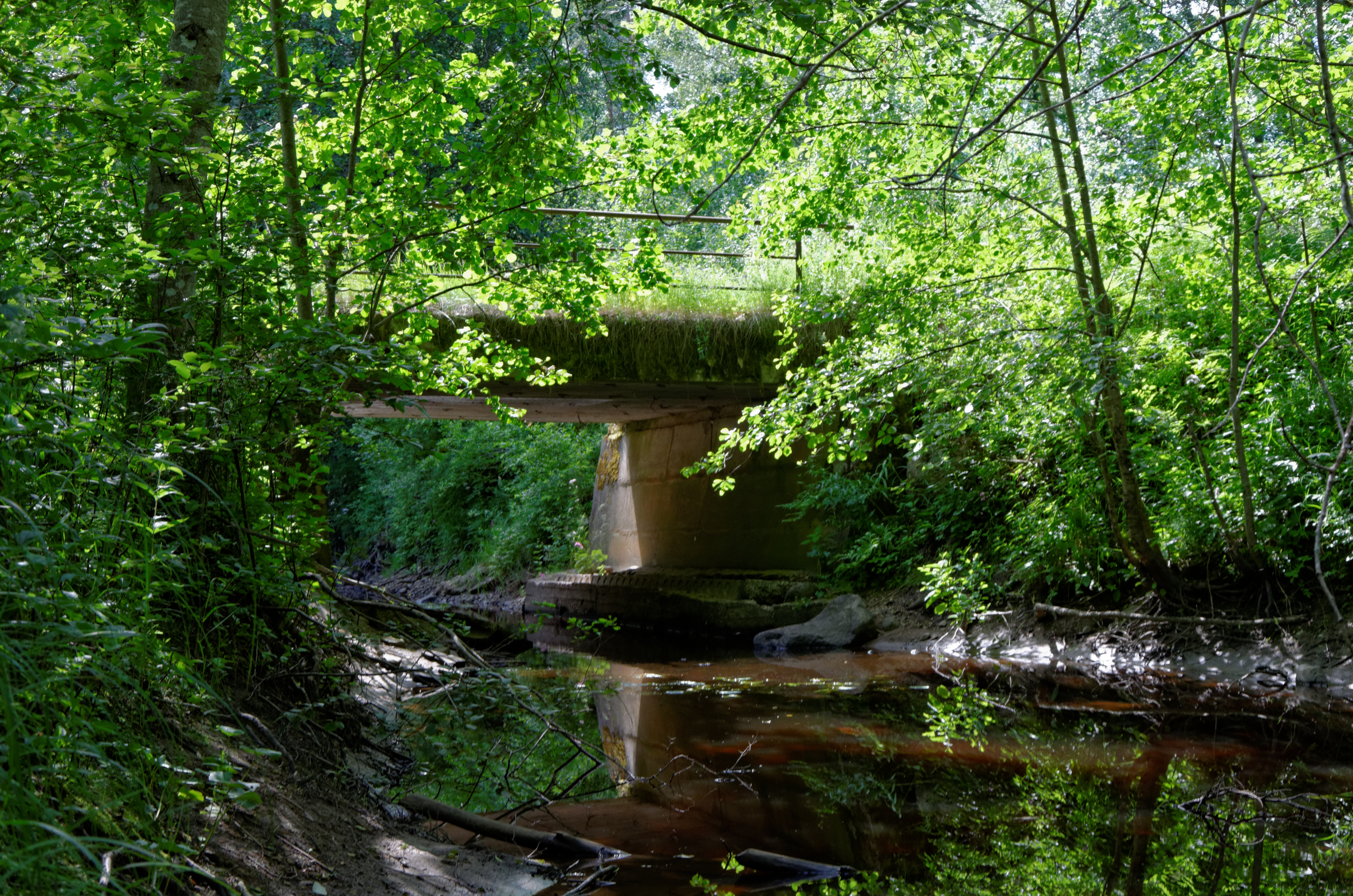
- The Ura River in the village of Ilvese

Location
- Country: Estonia

Physical characteristics
- Mouth: Pärnu Bay
  - location: near Uulu
  - coordinates: 58°17′33″N 24°34′29″E
- Length: 58.4 km (36.3 mi)
- Basin size: 186 km^{2} (72 sq mi)

The Ura River is a river in Pärnu County in Estonia. The river is 58.4 kilometres (36.3 mi) long, and its basin size is 186 square kilometres (72 sq mi). It drains into the Baltic Sea.

Trout and grayling live in the river.
