= Lac de Vitalaca =

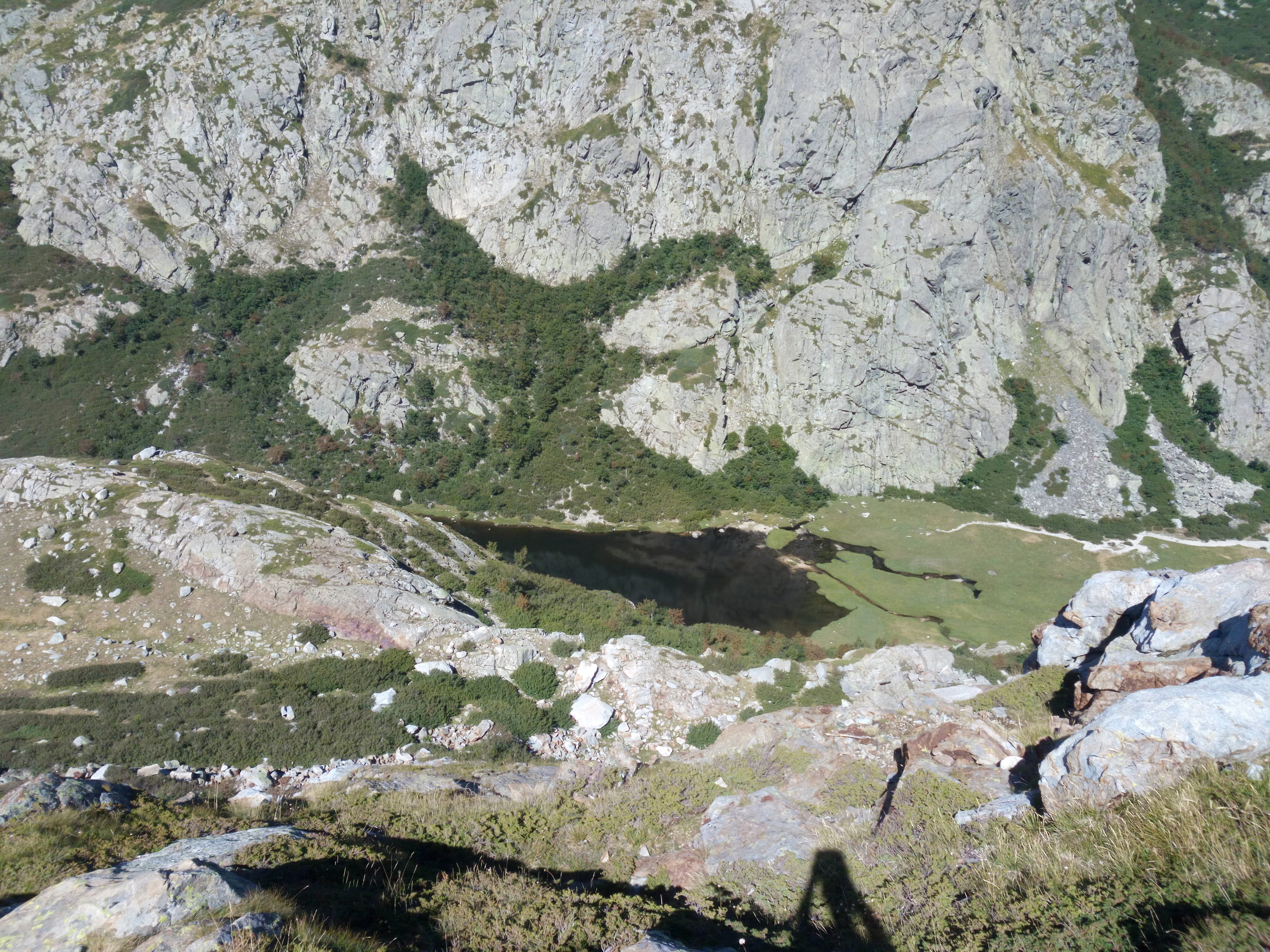

- Location within Corsica Location within France
- Location: Corse-du-Sud, Corsica
- Coordinates: 42.04727°N 9.12126°E
- Type: Lake
- Basin countries: France

Lac de Vitalaca (Corsican: Lavu di Vitalaca) is a small lake in the Monte Renoso Massif in the Corse-du-Sud department of France. It is at an altitude of 1,777 metres, and is surrounded by high mountains.

== Location ==
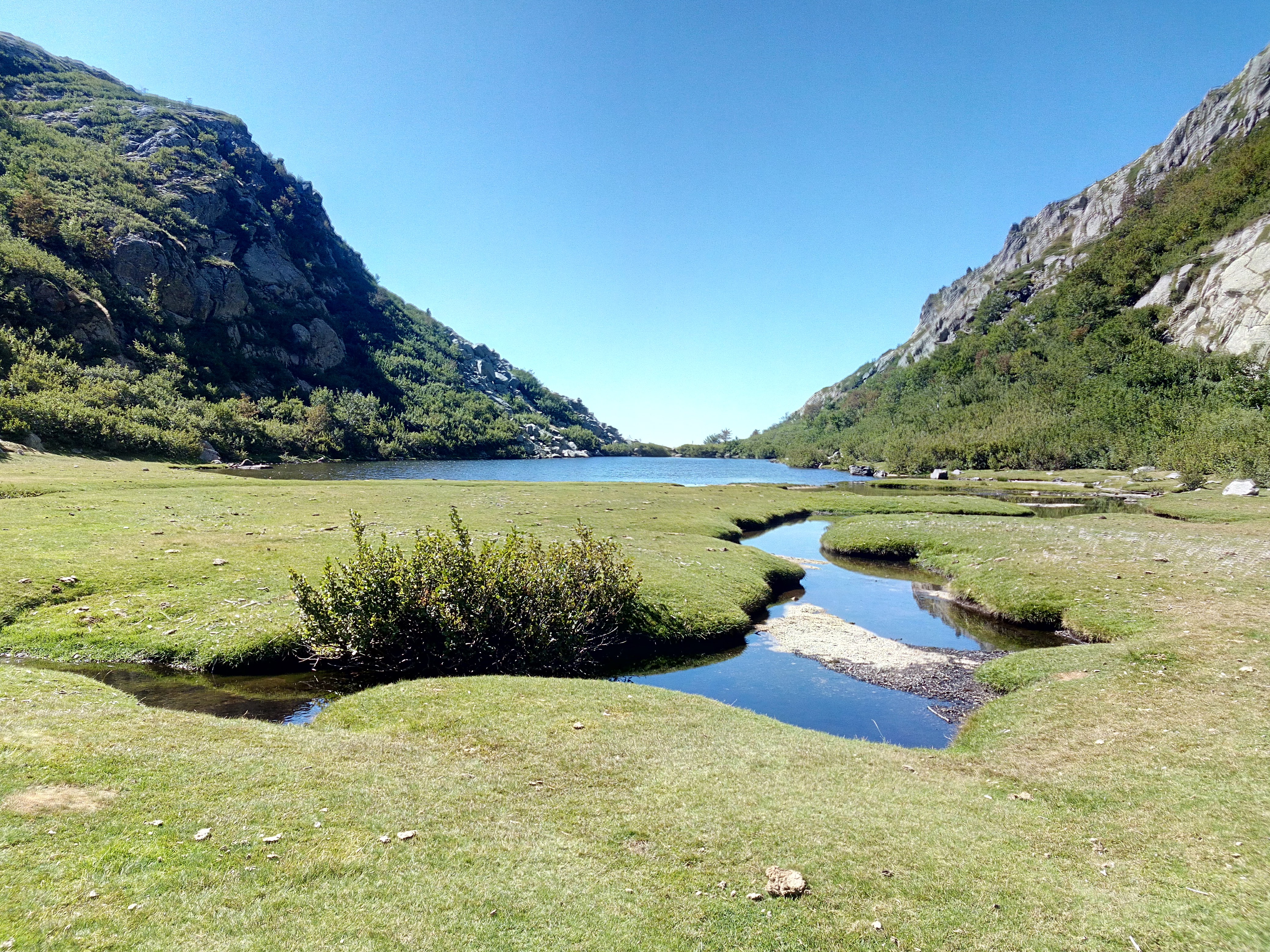
Approach to the lake

Lac de Vitalaca is in the commune of Bastelica. It is in the Monte Renoso Massif between the 2,250 metres (7,380 ft) Punta Capanella to the west and the 1,946 metres (6,385 ft) Bocca della Calle to the east. The Prunelli river, which originates in Lac de Bracca, enters the north end of the lake and leaves the south end. The lake is at an altitude of 1,777 metres (5,830 ft). The lake is surrounded by pozzines, or peat lawns crossed by streams. (Note: Pozzines, from the Corsican language i Pozzi meaning "wells", are acidic peat lawns crossed by winding streams. The oldest pozzines in Corsica formed about 12,000 years ago. They occupy depressions formed by ancient glacial lakes that have been filled by sediment and dead plants, and are found at altitudes between 1,700 and 2,300 metres (5,600 and 7,500 ft).) It is encircled by high mountains and has a dramatic panorama towards the south.

A hiking route from the Fontaine de Verge, 2 kilometres (1.2 mi) east of Bastelica at an altitude of 877 metres (2,877 ft) leads up the right bank of the Prunelle, past the Latina sheepfolds at 1,260 metres (4,130 ft) and through the Col de Latina, then past Lake Vitalaca and onward up easy slopes to the top of Monte Renoso at 2,352 metres (7,717 ft).

== See also ==
- List of waterbodies of Corse-du-Sud

== Sources ==
- "Le lac de Vitalaca", chibu.fr (in French), 2012
- "Les Bergeries des Pozzi", Visorando (in French)
- "Monte Renoso / Monte Rinosu : en boucle par le lac de Vitalaca et le col de Scaldasole", Camptocamp (in French)
- "Way: Lac de Vitalaca (178942946)", OpenStreetMap
