= Kikepera =

Village in Estonia

Coordinates: 58°15′N 24°52′E

- Village
- Interactive map of Kikepera
- Country: Estonia
- County: Pärnu County
- Parish: Saarde Parish
- Time zone: UTC+2 (EET)
  - Summer (DST): UTC+3 (EEST)

Kikepera is a village in Saarde Parish, Pärnu County in southwestern Estonia. Prior to the administrative reforms of local governments in 2017, it belonged to Surju Parish

The Kikepera training area of the Estonian Defence Forces is located in the village.

== See also ==
- Kikepera Nature Reserve
