= Saarde Parish =

Municipality of Estonia (2017)

Coordinates: 58°9′N 24°57′E

Saarde Parish Saarde vald
- Municipality of Estonia
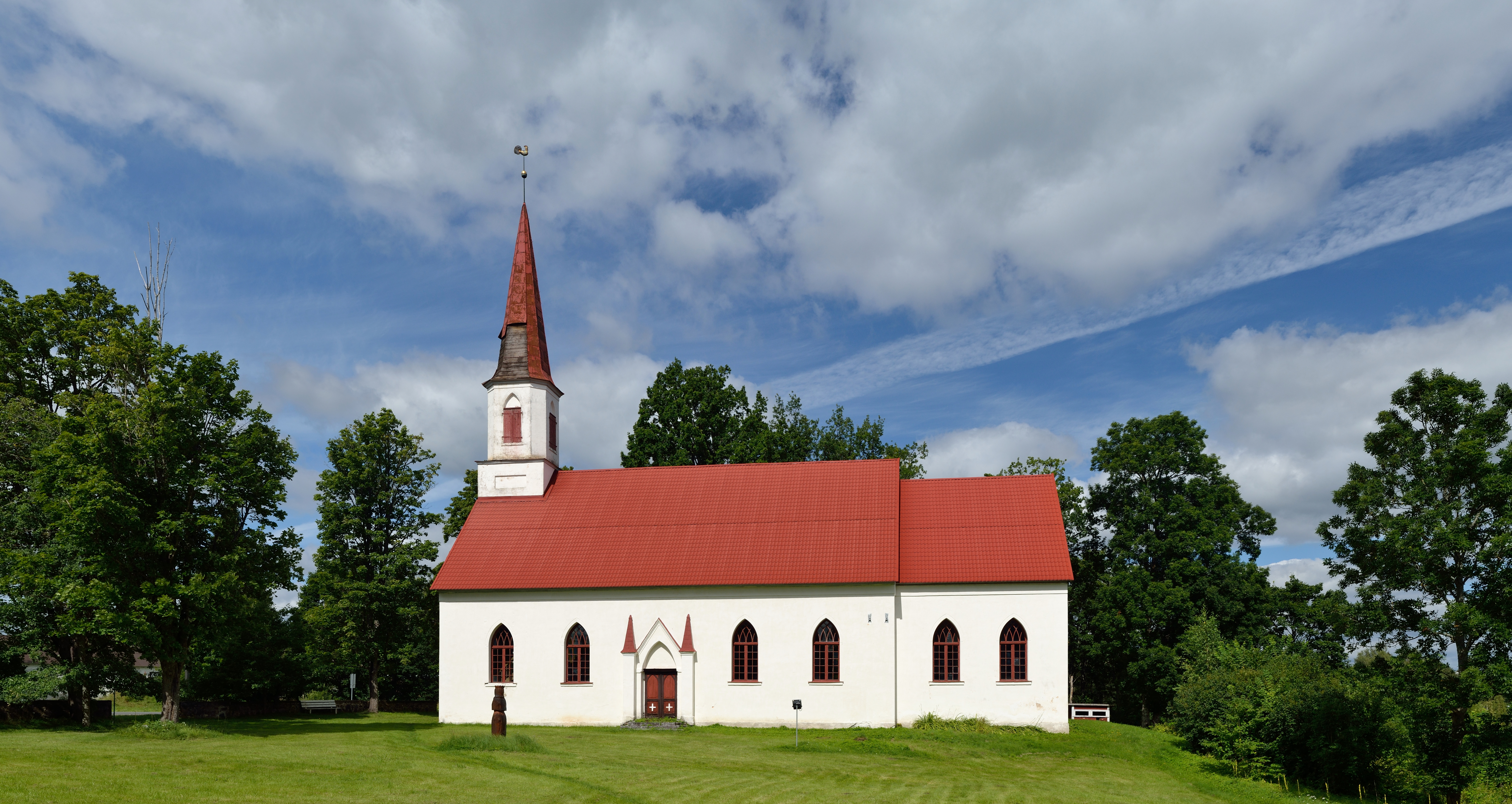
- Saarde church

- Flag Coat of arms

- Saarde Parish within Pärnu County.
- Country: Estonia
- County: Pärnu County
- Administrative centre: Kilingi-Nõmme

Area
  - Total: 706.9 km^{2} (272.9 sq mi)

Population (01.01.2007)
  - Total: 3,908
  - Density: 5.528/km^{2} (14.32/sq mi)
- ISO 3166 code: EE-712
- Website: www.saarde.ee

Saarde is a municipality located in Pärnu County, one of the 15 counties of Estonia.

== Settlements ==
Town

Kilingi-Nõmme

Small borough

Tihemetsa

Villages

Allikukivi - Ilvese - Jaamaküla - Jäärja - Kalda - Kalita - Kamali - Kanaküla - Kärsu - Kikepera - Kõveri - Lähkma - Laiksaare - Lanksaare - Leipste - Lodja - Marana - Marina - Metsaääre - Mustla - Oissaare - Pihke - Rabaküla - Reinse - Reinu - Ristiküla - Saarde - Saunametsa - Sigaste - Surju - Tali - Tuuliku - Tõlla - Väljaküla - Veelikse - Viisireiu

== Religion ==
In terms of religion in the 2021 census of at least 15-years old residents 9.8% of the residents of the parish declared themselves Lutheran, 1.8% declared themselves Orthodox. The majority of residents of the parish, 84.4% declared themselves religiously unaffiliated. 0.8% of the population followed other religions, 3.2% did not specify their religious affiliation.

== Notable people ==
- Nikolai Talts (1890 Laiksaare Parish – 1949), lawyer and politician, Ministry of Regional Affairs and Agriculture, 1933–1938
- Hendrik Toompere Sr. (1946, in Mustla – 2008), actor and director.
- Kersti Kreismann (born 1947 in Tali), actress.
- Ants Järvesaar (born 1948 in Surju Parish), farmer and politician, Mayor of Häädemeeste, 2013 to 2014.
- Mart Opmann (born 1956 in Surju), politician, Minister of Finance, 1995–1999
