= Hendrik Toompere Sr. =

Estonian actor and director

Hendrik Toompere Sr. (17 July 1946, in Mustla – 13 October 2008) was an Estonian actor and director.

Hendrik Toompere Sr. was born on 17 July 1946 in Mustla, Pärnumaa, Estonia. Toompere was married to actress Maie Toompere (née Kruusenberg). His children are actors Harriet Toompere and Hendrik Toompere Jr., and his grandson is Hendrik Toompere Jr. Jr.

Since 1963 he worked at Estonian State Puppet Theatre.

Awards:

- 2001: Order of the White Star, V class.

== Theatrical roles ==
- 1963: "Pärdik ja Kastanipoiss" (role: Kastanipoiss)
- 1963: "Pardike Tuttpütt" (role: rabbit)
- 1965: "Neli meistrit" (role: wolf)
- 2006: "Ohtlik lend" (role: Suursoo)

as a director

- 1981 Filipoiu' "Kukkur kahe krossiga" (director)
- 1983 Kivistik's "Tänavatund" (director)
- 1992 Kitzberg's "Udumäe kuningas" (director)
