= Allikukivi =

Village in Estonia

- Village
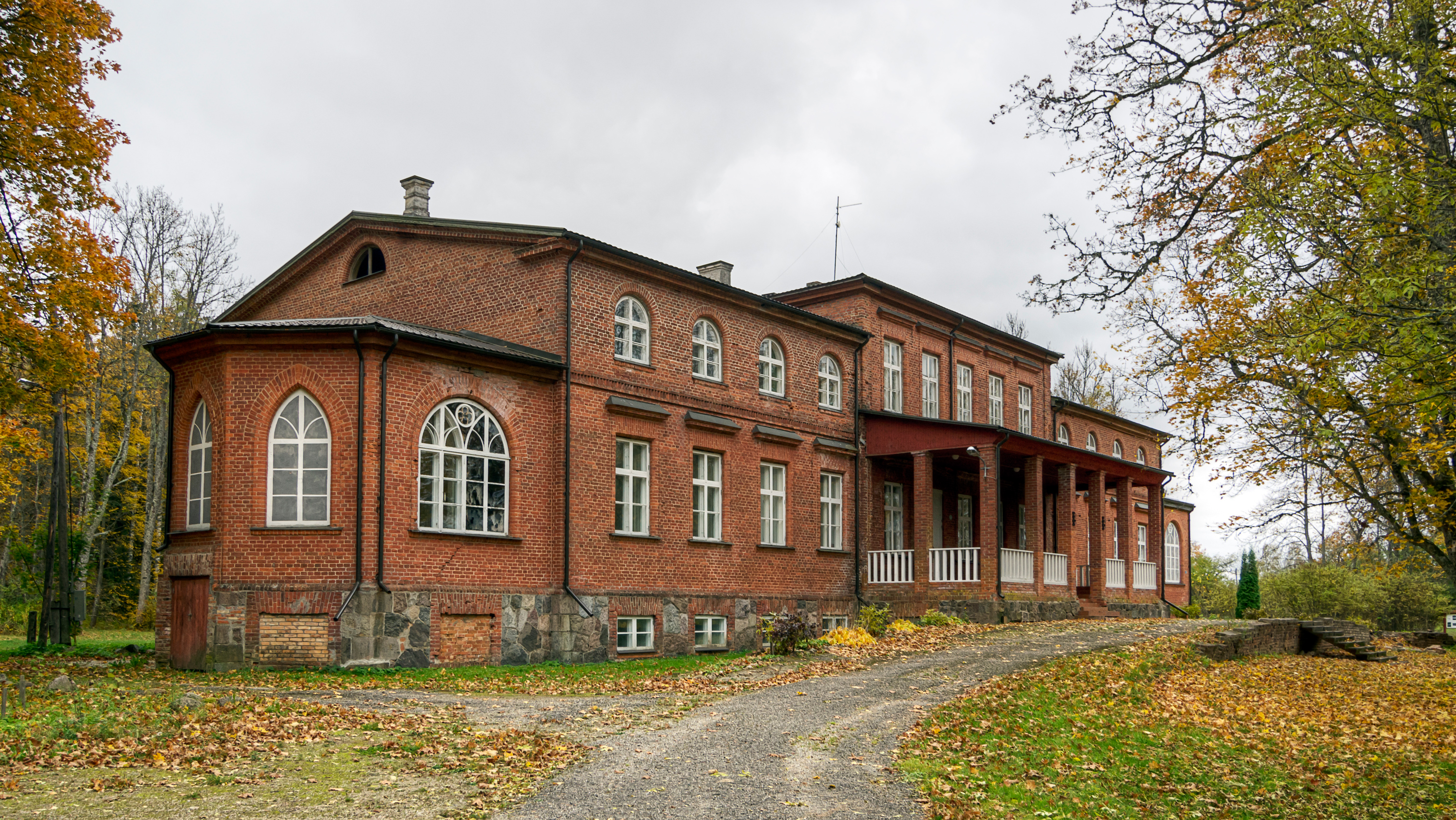
- House of Albert Zoepfel, the director of the former Allikukivi broadcloth factory

- Location within Estonia
- Coordinates: 58.15°N 25.0147°E
- Country: Estonia
- County: Pärnu County
- Parish: Saarde Parish
- Time zone: UTC+2 (EET)
  - Summer (DST): UTC+3 (EEST)

Allikukivi (also Alliku) is a village in Saarde Parish, Pärnu County in Estonia.

The village is named after the Allikukivi Kalevitehas (broadcloath/textile factory), founded there in the middle of the 19th century, whose German name was Quellenstein.
