= Ristiküla, Pärnu County =

Village in Estonia

Coordinates: 58°10′37″N 24°48′14″E

- Village
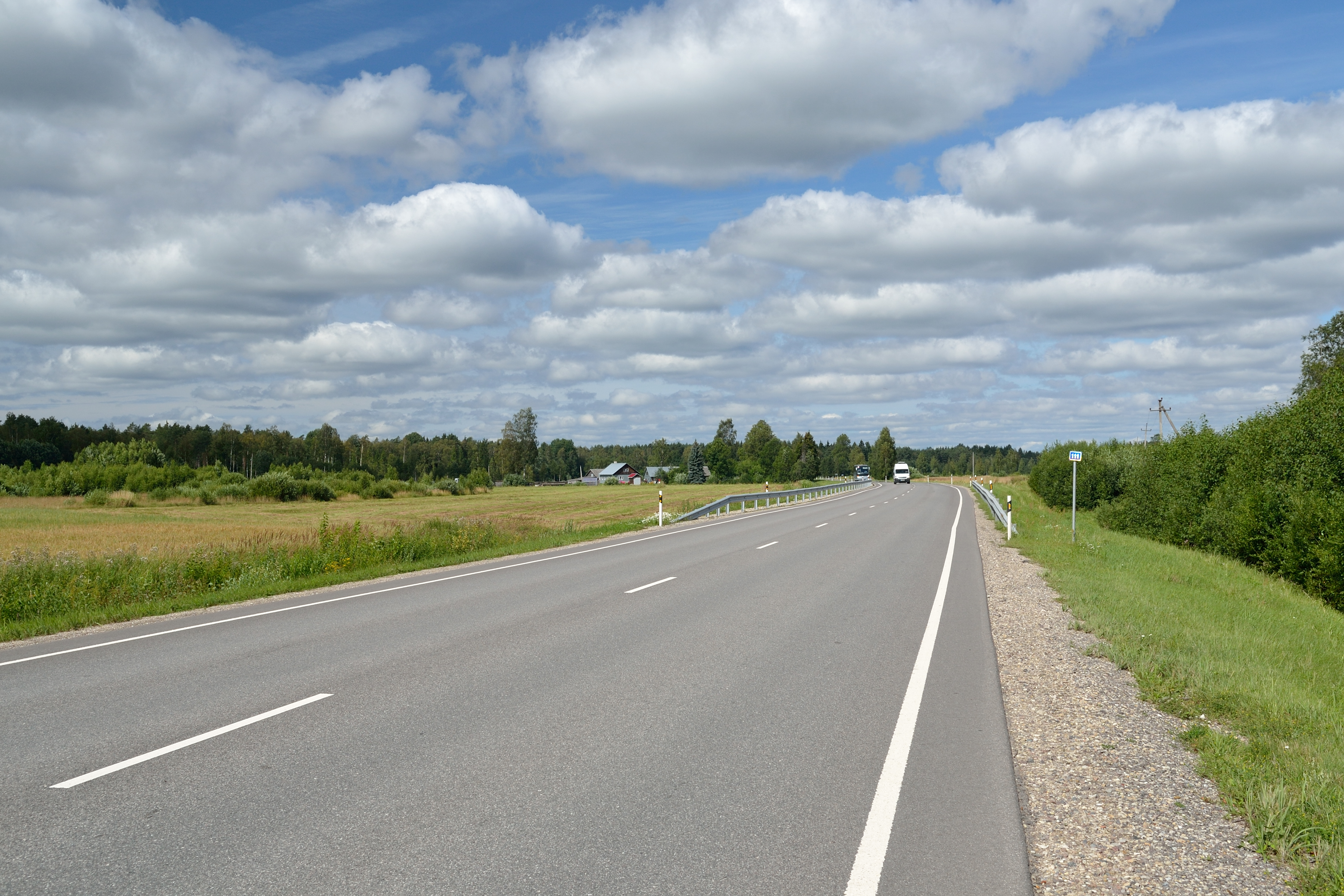
- The Valga–Uulu road in Ristiküla
- Interactive map of Ristiküla, Pärnu County
- Country: Estonia
- County: Pärnu County
- Parish: Saarde Parish
- Time zone: UTC+2 (EET)
  - Summer (DST): UTC+3 (EEST)

Ristiküla is a village in Saarde Parish, Pärnu County in southwestern Estonia.

Ristiküla was the birthplace of historian Hendrik Sepp (1888–1943).
