= Kikepera Nature Reserve =

Protected area in Estonia

- Location within Estonia
- Location: Estonia
- Coordinates: 58°19′N 25°00′E
- Area: 10,733 ha (26,520 acres)
- Established: 2007 (2017)

Kikepera Nature Reserve is a nature reserve which is located in Pärnu County, Estonia.

The area of the nature reserve is 10,733 ha.

The protected area was founded in 2007 on the basis of Kikepera Protected Area (Estonian: Kikepera hoiuala).
