= Ilvese =

Village in Estonia

Coordinates: 58°14′N 24°41′E

- Village
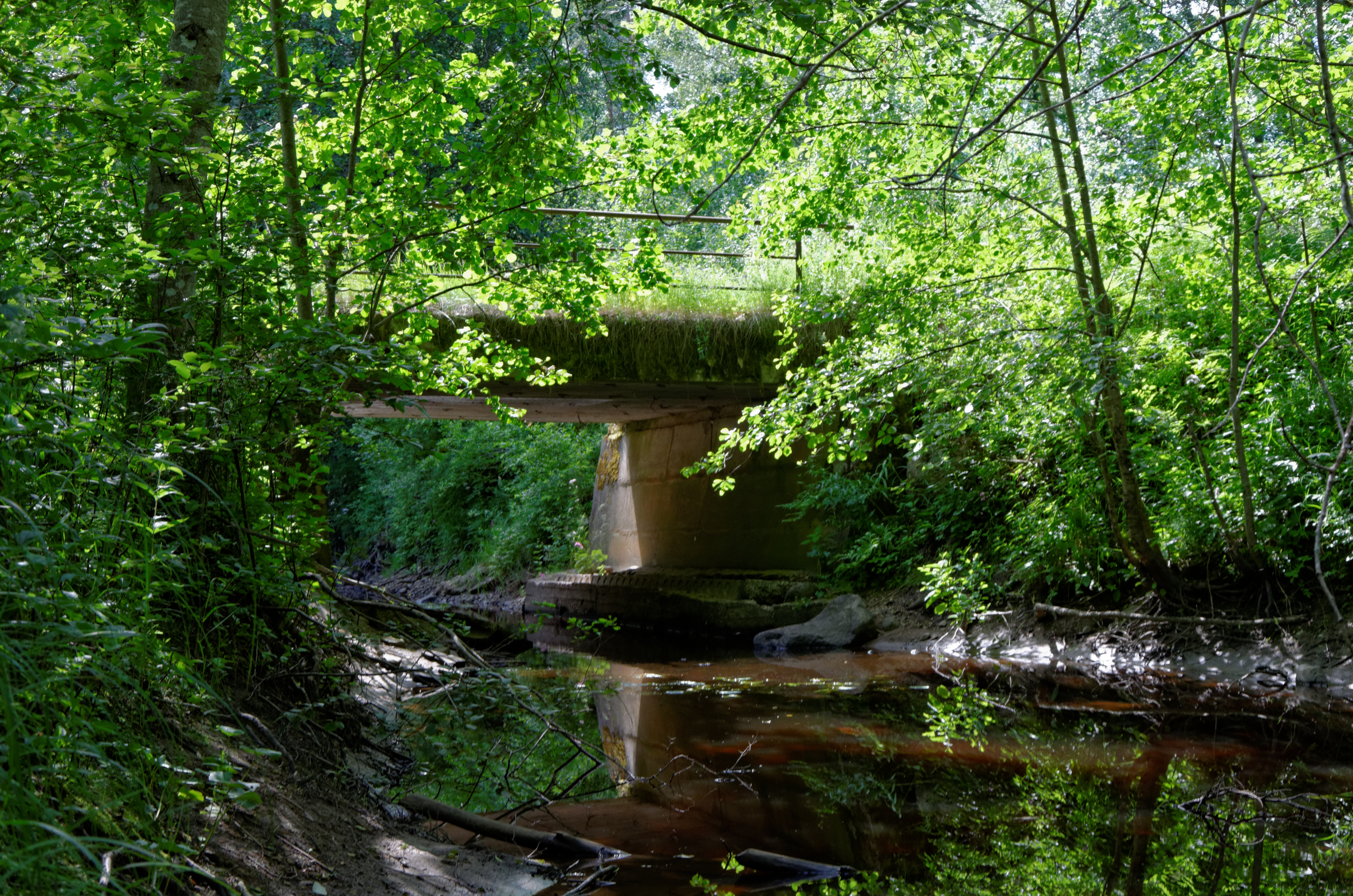
- Bridge over the Ura River in Ilvese
- Interactive map of Ilvese
- Country: Estonia
- County: Pärnu County
- Parish: Saarde Parish
- Time zone: UTC+2 (EET)
  - Summer (DST): UTC+3 (EEST)

Ilvese is a village in Saarde Parish, Pärnu County in southwestern Estonia. Prior to the administrative reform of local governments in 2017, the village was part of Surju Parish.
