= Kanaküla =

Village in Estonia

Coordinates: 58°15′N 25°06′E

- Village
- Interactive map of Kanaküla
- Country: Estonia
- County: Pärnu County
- Parish: Saarde Parish
- Time zone: UTC+2 (EET)
  - Summer (DST): UTC+3 (EEST)

Kanaküla is a village in Saarde Parish, Pärnu County, in southwestern Estonia.

On 18 January 2021, part of Kanaküla's territory was detached, and the new village of Reinse was established.
