= Veelikse, Pärnu County =

Village in Estonia

Coordinates: 58°02′17″N 24°51′26″E

- Village
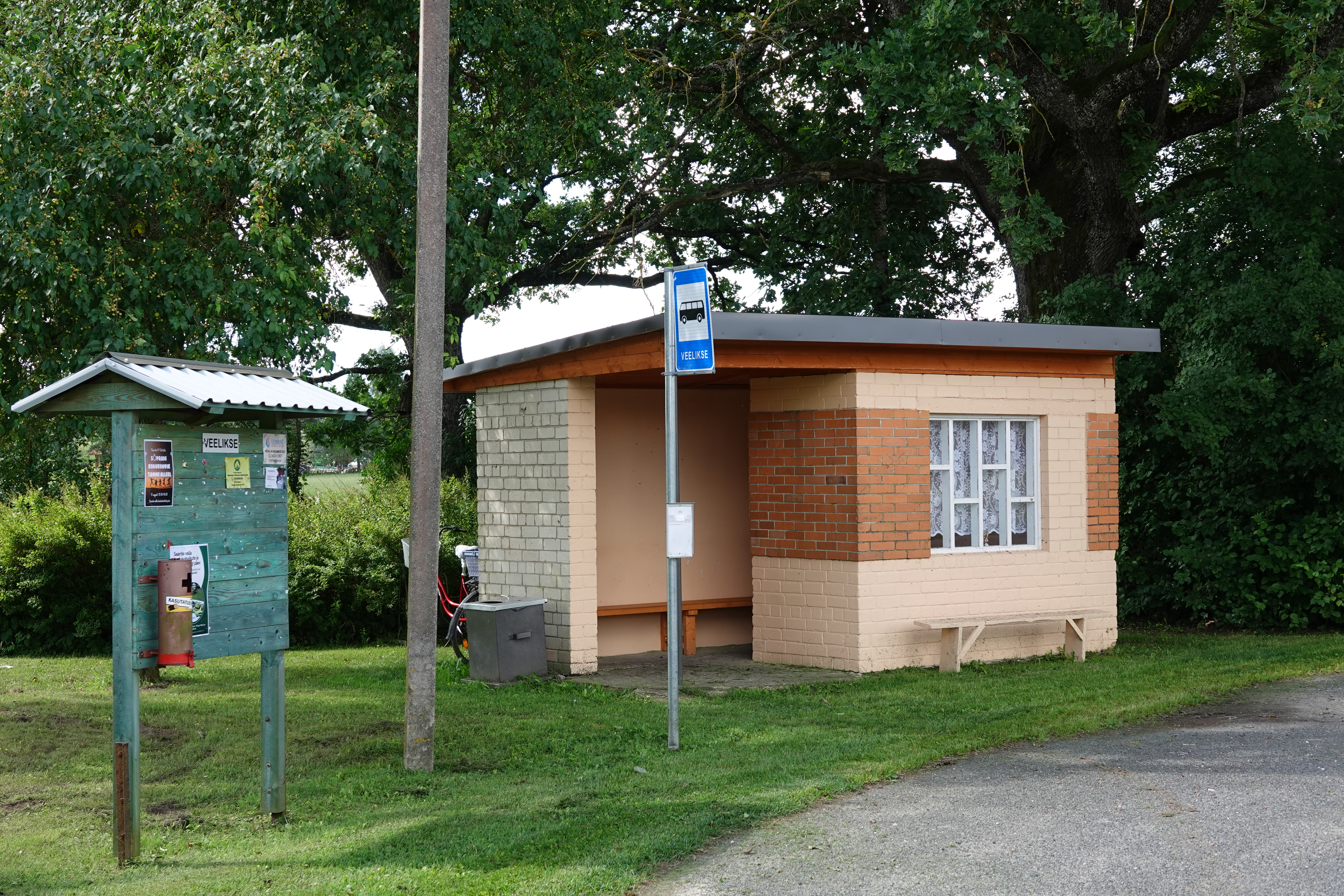
- Interactive map of Veelikse, Pärnu County
- Country: Estonia
- County: Pärnu County
- Parish: Saarde Parish
- Time zone: UTC+2 (EET)
  - Summer (DST): UTC+3 (EEST)

Veelikse is a village in Saarde Parish, Pärnu County in southwestern Estonia.
