= Kalda, Pärnu County =

Village in Estonia

Coordinates: 58°11′40″N 24°46′46″E

Kalda
- Village
- Interactive map of Kalda
- Country: Estonia
- County: Pärnu County
- Parish: Saarde Parish
- Time zone: UTC+2 (EET)
  - Summer (DST): UTC+3 (EEST)

Kalda is a village in Saarde Parish, Pärnu County in southwestern Estonia. Prior to the administrative reforms of local governments in 2017, it belonged to Surju Parish.
