= Mustla, Pärnu County =

Village in Estonia

Mustla
- Location within Estonia
- Coordinates: 58°8′3″N 25°6′1″E
- Country: Estonia
- County: Pärnu County
- Parish: Saarde Parish
- Time zone: UTC+2 (EET)

Mustla is a village in Saarde Parish, Pärnu County in southern Estonia.
