= Reinu, Pärnu County =

Village in Estonia

Coordinates: 58°02′37″N 24°45′05″E

- Village
- Interactive map of Reinu, Pärnu County
- Country: Estonia
- County: Pärnu County
- Parish: Saarde Parish
- Time zone: UTC+2 (EET)
  - Summer (DST): UTC+3 (EEST)

Reinu is a village in Saarde Parish, Pärnu County in southwestern Estonia.

== Notable people ==
- Karl Pallo (1896–1986), New Zealand importer, manufacturing engineer and businessman
