= Lac de Tolla =

Reservoir on Corsica, France

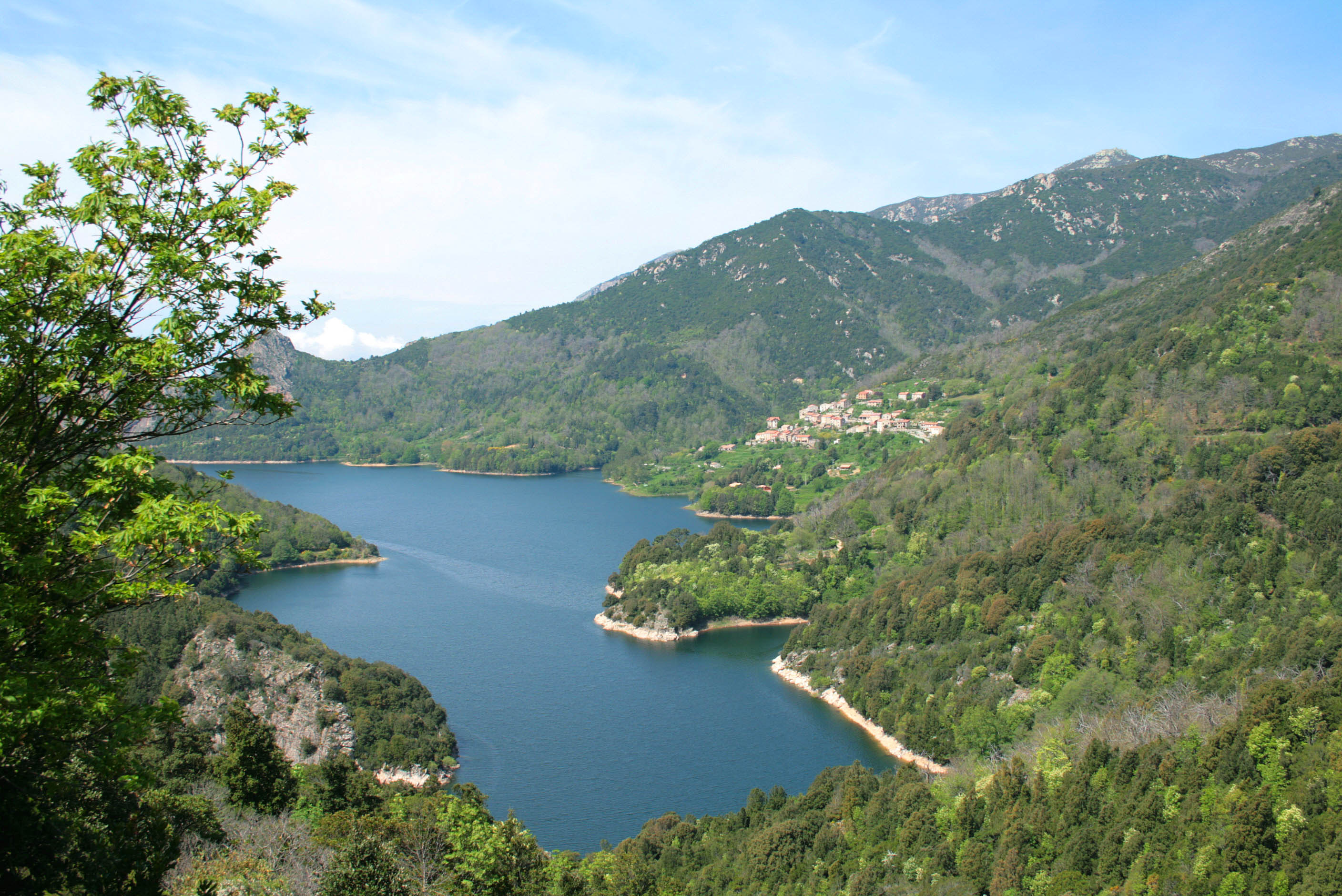
- Tolla village and lake

- Location within Corsica Location within France
- Location: Corse-du-Sud, Corsica
- Coordinates: 41.9683°N 8.9771°E
- Type: Lake
- Basin countries: France

The Lac de Tolla is a reservoir in the Corse-du-Sud department of France on the island of Corsica. It is the largest lake on Corsica, and powers a hydroelectric plant.

== Location ==
The Lac de Tolla is formed by a dam (Barrage de Tolla) on the Prunelli river. The Ruisseau d'Agnone and the Ese River also empty into the lake. It is in the commune of Tolla just south of the village of Tolla. The D3 road runs along its north shore. Lake Tolla is at an altitude of 550 metres (1,800 ft). There is a belvedere on the heights above the lake from which the dam can be seen. It is less than an hour's drive away from Ajaccio.

== Dam ==
The Barrage de Tolla was built between 1958 and 1960, and was commissioned in 1965. It is owned and operated by Électricité de France (EDF). It is a gravity dam 87 metres (285 ft) high and 120 metres (390 ft) long with a crest elevation of 563 metres (1,847 ft). It impounds 34,740,000 cubic metres (1.227×10^{9} cu ft) of water.

Between 3 November and 20 December 90,000,000 cubic metres (3.2×10^{9} cu ft) of water entered the reservoir, three times its capacity. Typically the reservoir would receive five times its capacity of water each year. On 20 December 2019 the Fabien storm caused the dam to overflow, but the structure was not damaged. When producing the maximum amount of electricity the dam releases 11 cubic metres (390 cu ft) of water per second. At the time of the flood the inflow was 20 cubic metres (710 cu ft) per second.

== Reservoir ==
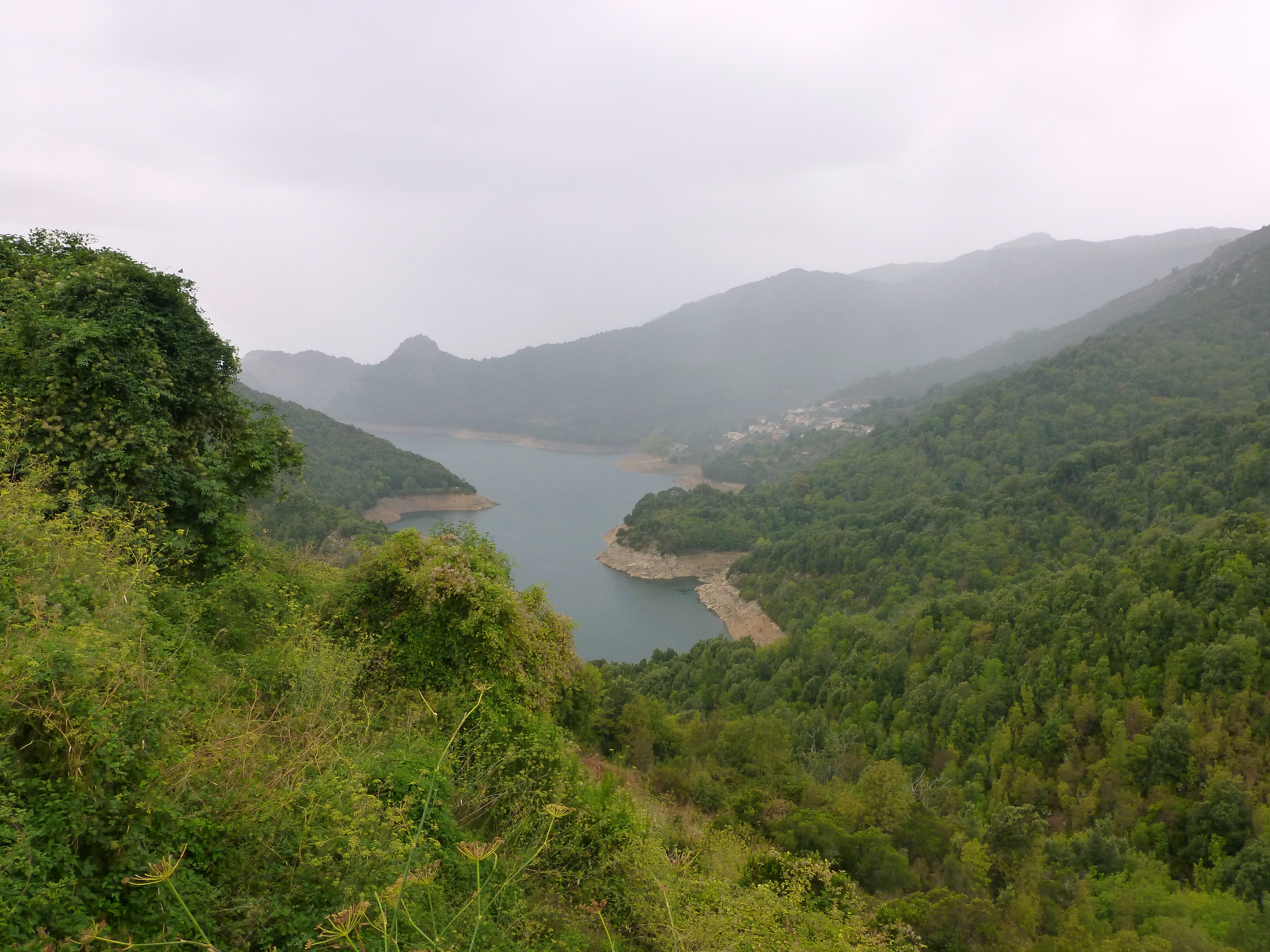
The lake from a distance

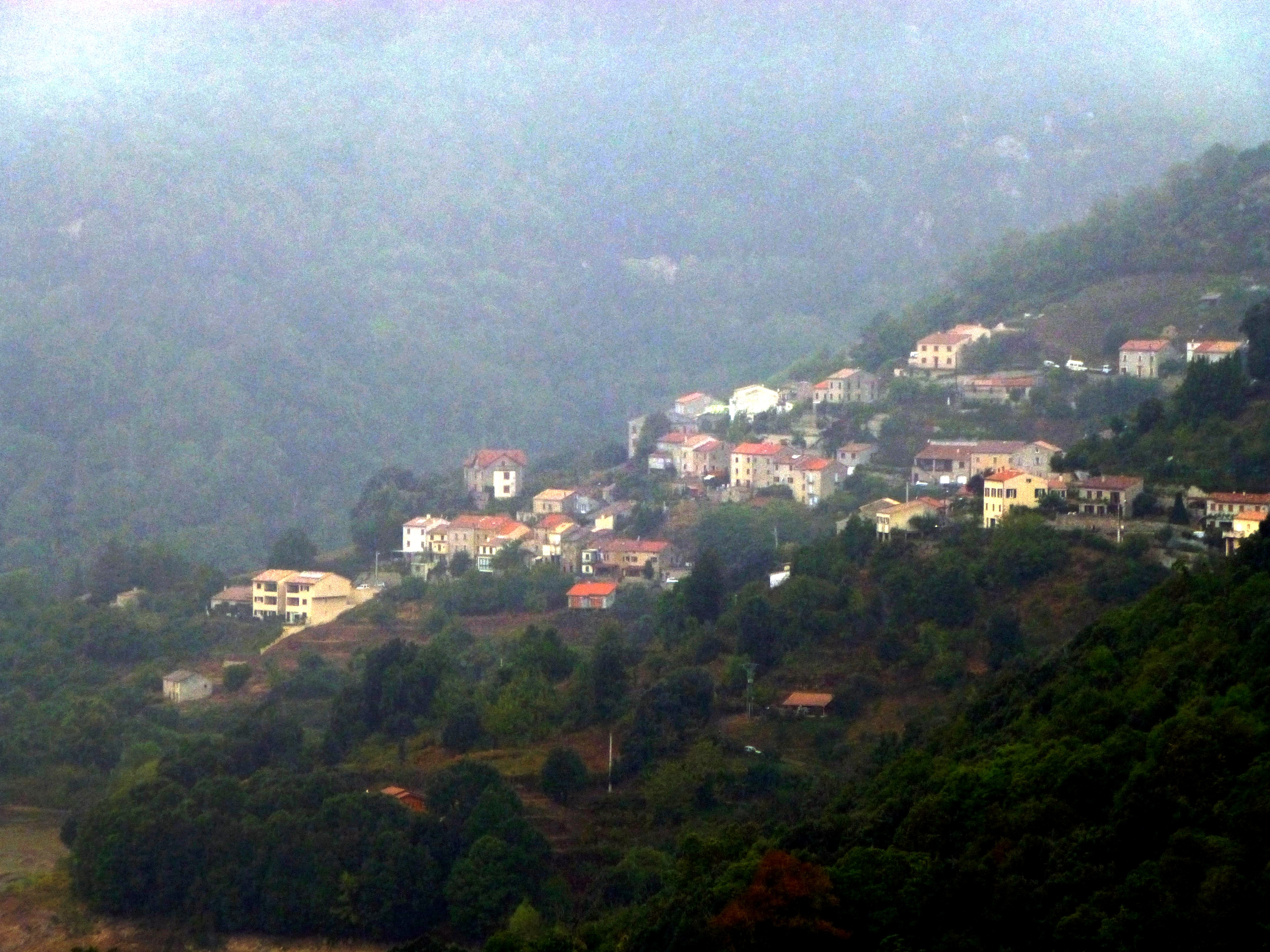
Tolla village

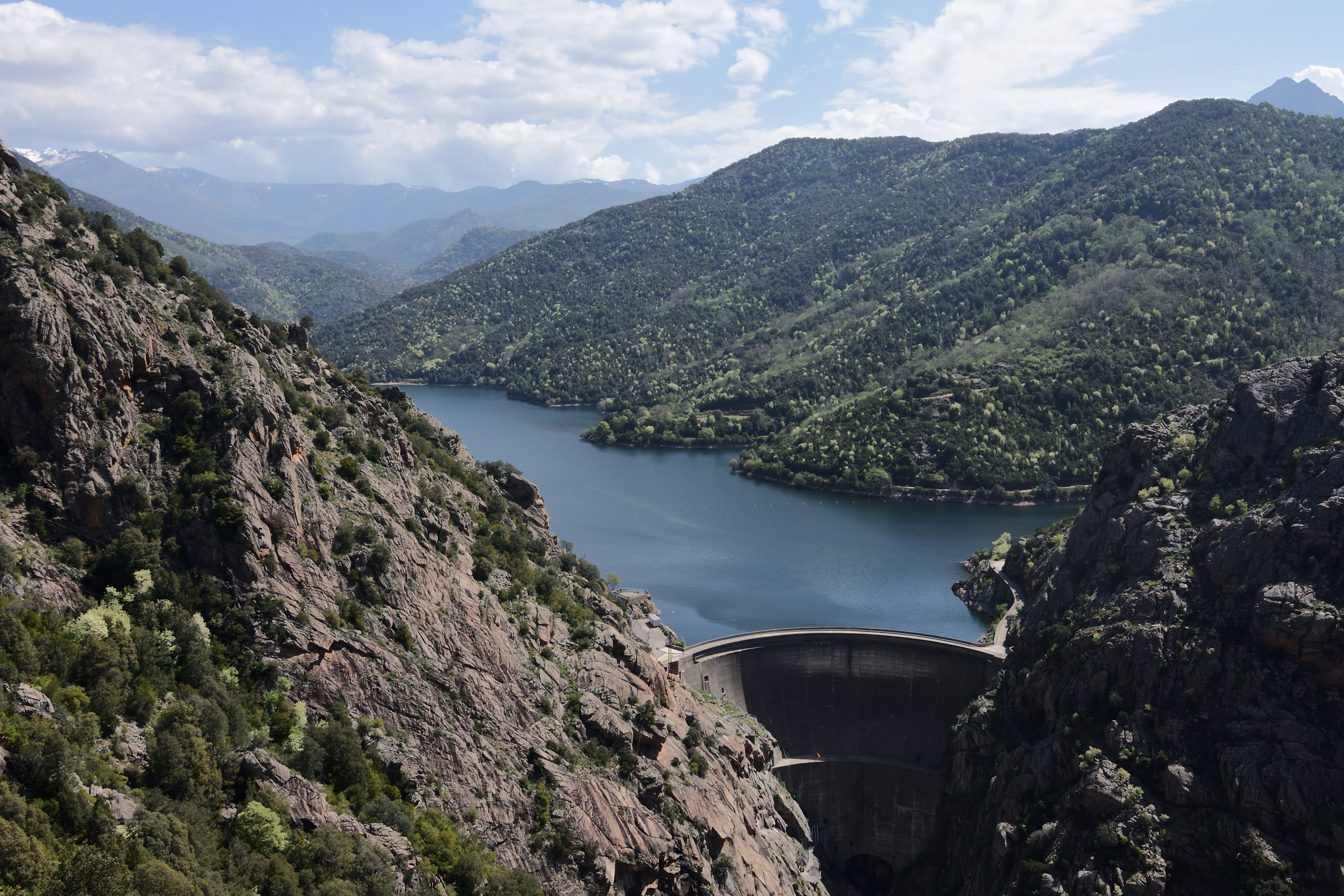
The dam

The reservoir covers 5 square kilometres (1.9 sq mi). It is fed by a watershed of 132 square kilometres (51 sq mi). The lake is popular with tourists in the summer from June to September. Swimming, kayaking, paddling, etc. are allowed, but motorized boats are not allowed. Anglers may fish for pike, pike perch, perch, carp, roach and catfish.

== See also ==
- List of waterbodies of Corse-du-Sud

== Sources ==
- Colonna, Jacques (4 January 2020), "Corse-du-Sud : le barrage filtrant de Tolla", Corse Matin (in French)
- Corse : Barrage de Tolla (in French), CFBR Comité Français des Barrages et Réservoirs
- "Le lac de Tolla", chibu.fr (in French), 23 August 2009
- Maurizi, Marie (8 August 2018), "Le lac de Tolla : Une promenade très prisée", Corse net infos (in French)
- "Way: Lac de Tolla (173091909)", OpenStreetMap
