= Tolla, Corse-du-Sud =

Commune in Corsica, France

Tolla
- Commune
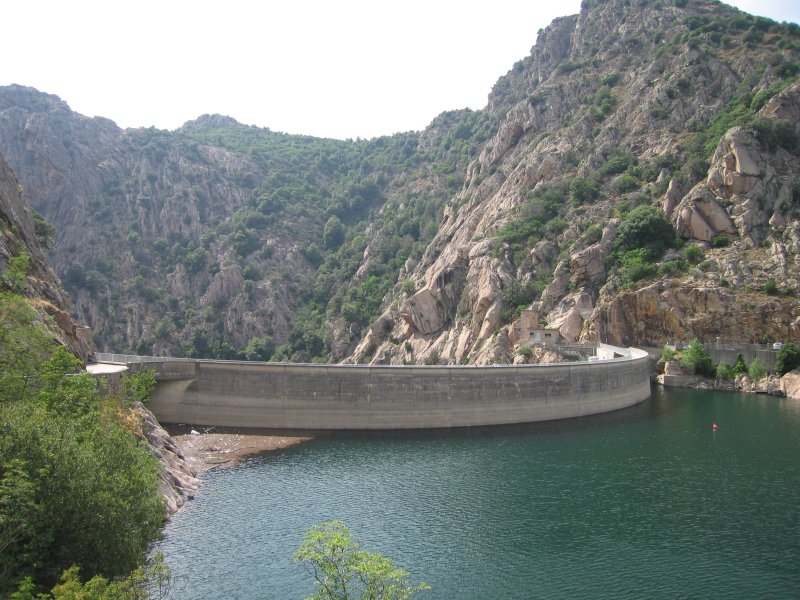
- The Tolla Dam
- Location of Tolla
- Location within France Location within Corsica
- Coordinates: 41°58′34″N 8°58′23″E
- Country: France
- Region: Corsica
- Department: Corse-du-Sud
- Arrondissement: Ajaccio
- Canton: Gravona-Prunelli

Government
  - Mayor (2020–2026): Dominique Vincenti
- Area^{1}: 25.45 km^{2} (9.83 sq mi)
- Elevation: 715 m (2,346 ft)
- Highest elevation: 1,507 m (4,944 ft)
- Lowest elevation: 222 m (728 ft)
- Population (2023): 120
  - Density: 4.7/km^{2} (12/sq mi)
- Time zone: UTC+01:00 (CET)
  - Summer (DST): UTC+02:00 (CEST)
- INSEE/Postal code: 2A326 /20117
- ^{1} French Land Register data, which excludes lakes, ponds, glaciers > 1 km^{2} (0.386 sq mi or 247 acres) and river estuaries.

Tolla (French pronunciation: [tɔla]; Corsican: Todda) is a commune in the Corse-du-Sud department of France on the island of Corsica. It gives its name to the Lac de Tolla, a hydroelectric reservoir.

== Population ==
Historical population
Year	Pop.	±% p.a.
1968	233	—
1975	185	−3.24%
1982	115	−6.57%
1990	85	−3.71%
1999	98	+1.59%
2007	119	+2.46%
2012	111	−1.38%
2017	125	+2.40%
2023	120	−0.68%
Source: INSEE

== See also ==
- Communes of the Corse-du-Sud department
