= Surju =

Village in Estonia

Coordinates: 58°14′N 24°43′E

- Village
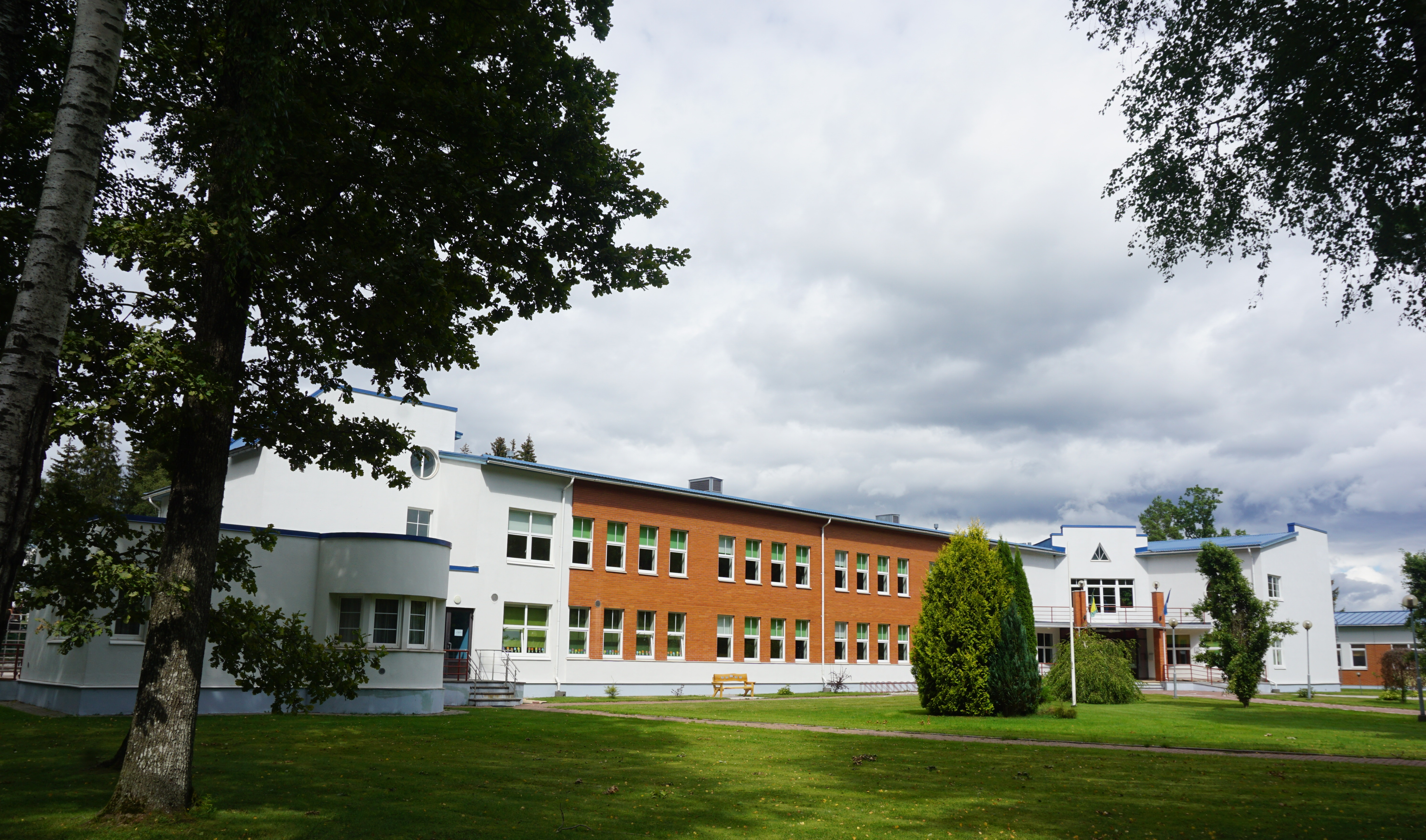
- Surju primary school
- Interactive map of Surju
- Country: Estonia
- County: Pärnu County
- Parish: Saarde Parish

Population (2020)
  - Total: 269
- Time zone: UTC+2 (EET)
  - Summer (DST): UTC+3 (EEST)

Surju is a village in Saarde Parish, Pärnu County in southwestern Estonia.
