= Ajaccio AOC =

French wine

- Wine region
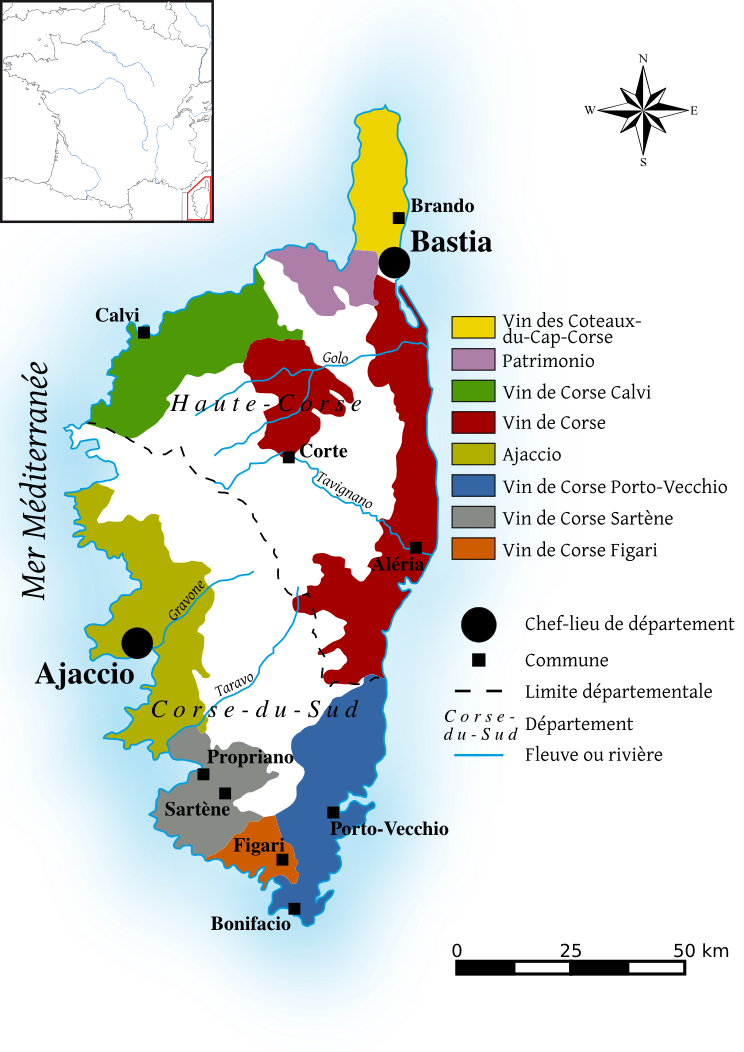
- Official name: Ajaccio AOC
- Type: wine region
- Year established: 1984; 42 years ago
- Country: France; Corsica
- Climate region: Mediterranean
- Soil conditions: granitic
- Size of planted vineyards: 220 hectares
- Grapes produced: Primarily Sciacarello, Grenache, Cinsault, Carignan, Vermentino (primarily), Ugni Blanc

Ajaccio is an Appellation d'Origine Contrôlée (AOC) for wine situated in Corsica, France as a part of the Corsica wine region. Ajaccio was earlier known as Coteaux d'Ajaccio and covers a vast stretch of land that looks down over the Mediterranean Sea. The wine-growing tradition in this area, one of the oldest traditions on the island, has grown up around carefully maintained estates and plots of land planted with Sciaccarello vines. Often seen as the jewel in the crown of Corsican grape varieties, Sciaccarellu grapes tend to give both red and rosé wines a distinctive flavour and elegance.

Coteaux d'Ajaccio was awarded VDQS status in 1971, became an AOC in 1976 as part of the larger Corse AOC, and became a separate AOC in 1984.

== Geographic Location ==
=== Orography ===
The wine growing area lies on sloping hillsides, rising up onto the highest slopes in Corsica. On average they are about 500 metres above sea level.

=== Geology ===
The highest peaks on the island, which form part of mountain ranges rising up out of the sea, are more than 2,000 metres above sea level. The vineyards are planted on granitic soil that is particularly suited to wine-growing.

=== Climate ===
The island, which enjoys 2,750 hours of sunshine per year, provides the vines with abundant heat in the summer, but this is rendered less extreme by the presence of sea and mountains. Frosts are uncommon and spring comes early in the year.

== Wine-growing Area ==
=== Profile ===
The wine-growing area includes the communes of: Afa, Ajaccio, Alata, Albitreccia, Ambiegna, Appietto, Arbori, Arro, Bastelicaccia, Calcatoggio, Cannelle, Carbuccia, Cargèse, Casaglione, Casalabriva, Cauro, Coggia, Cognocoli-Monticchi, Coti-Chiavari, Cuttoli-Corticchiato, Eccica-Suarella, Grosseto-Prugna, Ocana, Peri, Piana, Pietrosella, Pila-Canale, Sant'Andréa-d'Orcino, Sari-d'Orcino, Sarrola-Carcopino, Serra-di-Ferro, Tavaco, Valle-di-Mezzana, Vero, Vico, and Villanova.

=== Grape varieties ===
This AOC is planted with one main grape variety, Sciaccarello.

=== Terroir and wines ===
The reds are full-bodied wines, supple, yet with a solid structure, and are a lightish red in colour, with aromas of spices, tobacco and red fruits. They can be kept for between 4 and 6 years. They should be served at temperatures between 15 and 17 °C.

=== Marketing ===
The Ajaccio AOC makes up 7.3% of the total volume of wine certified under the Corsican AOCs.

== See also ==
- Corsica wine
