= Afa, Corse-du-Sud =

Commune in Corsica, France

Afa
- Commune
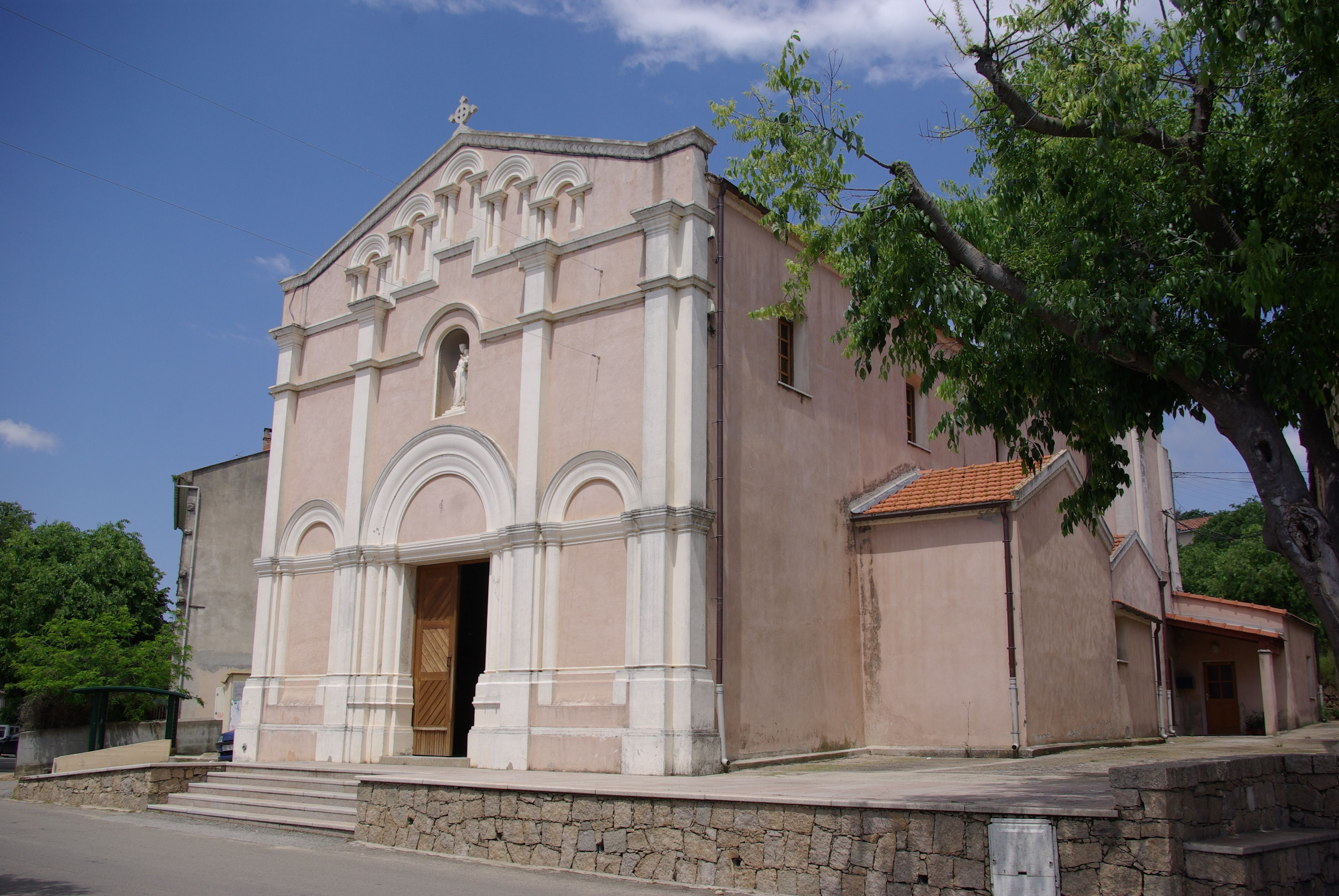
- The parish church of Afa
- Location of Afa
- Location within France Location within Corsica
- Coordinates: 41°59′05″N 8°47′47″E
- Country: France
- Region: Corsica
- Department: Corse-du-Sud
- Arrondissement: Ajaccio
- Canton: Gravona-Prunelli
- Intercommunality: CA Pays Ajaccien

Government
  - Mayor (2020–2026): Ange-Pascal Miniconi
- Area^{1}: 11.84 km^{2} (4.57 sq mi)
- Elevation: 110 m (360 ft)
- Highest elevation: 682 m (2,238 ft)
- Lowest elevation: 36 m (118 ft)
- Population (2023): 3,350
  - Density: 283/km^{2} (733/sq mi)
- Time zone: UTC+01:00 (CET)
  - Summer (DST): UTC+02:00 (CEST)
- INSEE/Postal code: 2A001 /20167
- ^{1} French Land Register data, which excludes lakes, ponds, glaciers > 1 km^{2} (0.386 sq mi or 247 acres) and river estuaries.

Afa (French pronunciation: [afa]), Italian: Afà (Italian pronunciation: [a'fa]), Corsican: Afà, is a commune in the Corse-du-Sud department on the island and collectivity of Corsica, France.

== Geography ==
Afa town is a small town about 8 kilometres (5 mi) north-east of Ajaccio, located north-west of the Gravona valley. Highway N194 forms the southern border of the commune and gives access to the town of Baleone. To access Afa from Ajaccio it is necessary to take the turn-off from Highway N194 to Highway D81 heading north to the intersection of Highway D161, which highway leads east into Afa village. Road D161 continues west through the canton to join Highway N193 forming an access road from the eastern side. There is also the D5 road giving access to Afa from Pratu Tondu in the east. The northern border is delineated by the peaks of the high mountain ranges to the north.

=== Relief ===
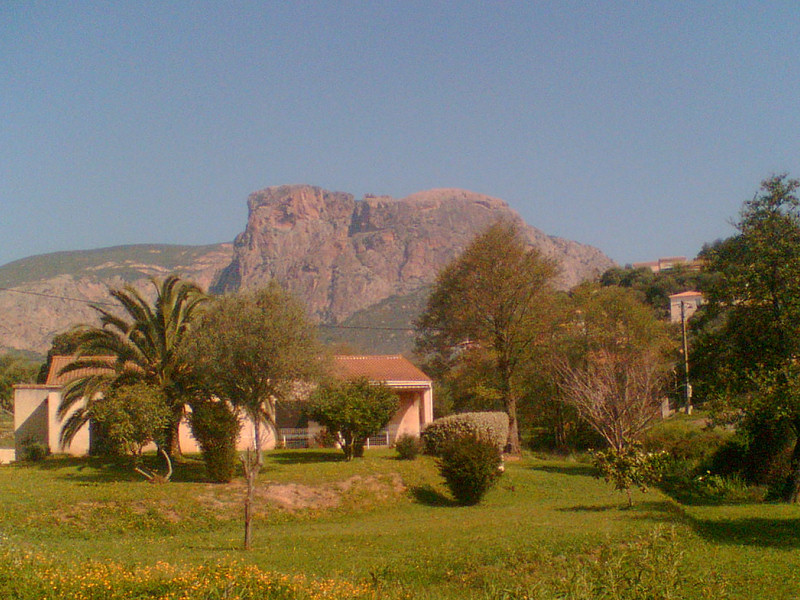
The Gozzi Rock

The commune lies on the southern slope of the Punta Pastinaca mountains, including Appietto at 814 metres (2,671 ft). The Rock of Gozzi, at 708 metres (2,323 ft), forms part of the northern border, "riding" on the two communes.

The commune territory is mostly flat from the foot of the steep Gozzi Rock. The highest point of the town is well watered with:

- the Calancone stream which originates in Punta Pastinaca
- the Mandriolo stream flowing from the Punta Pastinacale and delineating the north-east border of Afa with Sarrola-Carcopino
- the Stagnolo stream which rises on the south side of the Gozzi Rock and which flows into the Afa stream.

The Gravona Canal which supplies water to the town of Ajaccio, crosses the southern side of the commune, north of the industrial area of Baléone. At the entrance to Mezzavia on the southwestern border of the commune, an aqueduct spans the Verdana stream which is fed by the waters of Stagnolu and also crosses road D81 200 metres (660 ft) north of its junction with Highway NR194.

=== Habitat ===
The commune of Afa (Affà in Corsican as shown on cadastral maps) consists of four hamlets: Piscia Rossa Pastriccialone, part of Baléone and Afa in the centre.

==== Afa centre ====
Afa town is composed of a central core, the village, with many subdivisions around, the most important being Ogliastrone.

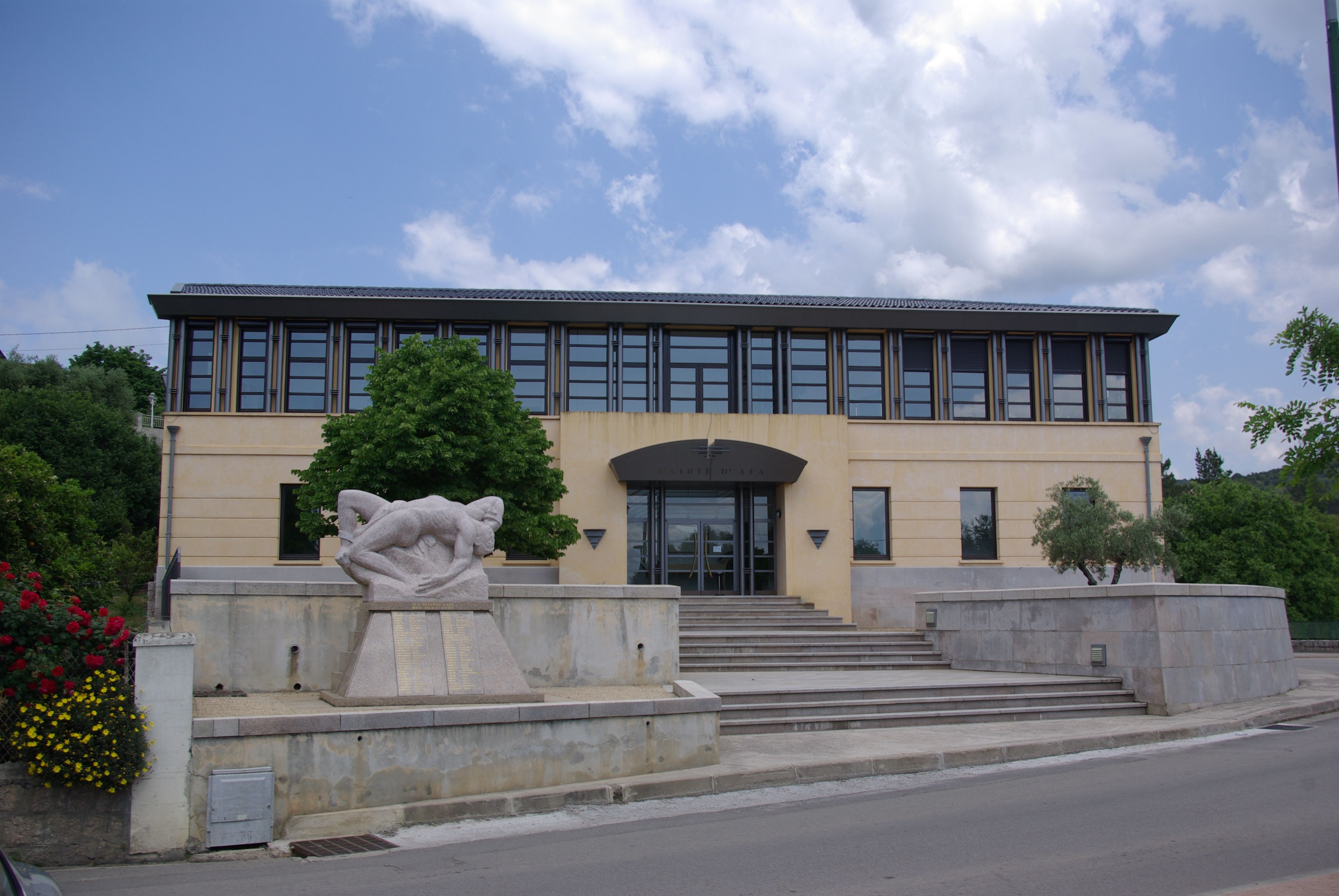
Afa Town hall

The Afa town hall was restored in 2004. In the city centre is a church that is about a hundred years old.

Gozzi Rock is visible from Afa.

==== Piscia Rossa ====
Piscia Rossa is north-west of the town, at the western foot of Monte Gozzi. Today, the village has spread out to the neighbouring commune of Appin.

==== Pastriccialone ====
U Pastriccialone is a small hamlet north-east of the town, south-east of the Gozzi Rock. In the village is the parish church of St. Anthony of Padua.

==== Baléone ====
Only the northern part of Baléone, which is an industrial area, belongs to the commune of Afa. It lies at the southern border of Afa.

== History ==
=== Modern times ===
In the 16th century the current territory of Afa did not exist as it was a part of the Pieve of La Mezana, a Pieve with a population of about 650 inhabitants in 1520 and with villages called: Sarla, Carcopino, la Punta, Londella, lo Cazille, lo Pogiale, and Opapu.

La Mezana, later called the Pieve of Mezzana, was surrounded by:

- the Pieve of Aiacio, population of about 500 inhabitants in 1520, which had villages called: Villanova, lo Linare, lo Pogio, Petra, Pozo di Borgo, Aiacio, L'Aia di Joani, li Montichi, and Lata
- the Pieve of Carceri or Celavo. Celavo had about 1,000 inhabitants in 1520 and had villages called: li Peri, lo Poggio, L'Ulmo, la Salasca, Cortiggiato, Cottoli, Carbuggia, Aogiani, lo Taxo, la Marinchia, Cavalli, Sant'Antonio, lo Poggio di Canivagia, lo Busso, lo Canavagia, Tavera, lo Canipalde, li Muraschi, li Corsachi, li Quercioli, lo Pè de Bocogani, Villanova le Celle, Tavaco, and Vero
- the Pieve of Cauro later became Sampiero, had about 500 inhabitants in 1520, with villages called: Bastelica, le Dominicaggie, le Emportagie, la Statione, le Follagie, la Valle, Santo, la Castellagie, le Vassellagie, Cauro, Ecosa, la Suarella, la Casavecchia, lo Poggio, Tola, Ocana, lo Piglio, Chena, la Salvolaggia, Zizoli, and Frasso
- the Pieve of Ginerca (or Cinerca) with 3000 inhabitants in 1520 and with villages called: Calcatojo, Sant'Andria, le Canelle, Sari, Casagiuni, Ambiegni, Lopigna, and Airo.

At the beginning of the 18th century, Afa continued in the Pieve Mezzana until 1789 when it became the canton of Sarrola-Carcopino.

Originally the village of Afa was a hamlet in the commune of Bocognano. In 1851 Afa became a municipality of the canton of Sarrola-Carcopino in the department of Corsica.

The commune of Afa was created through land abandonment by Sarrola-Carcopino and the Valle-di-Mezzana (I Vaddi di Mezana). The first mayor of Afa was called Carlo Calvelli and he was elected in 1852 and remained until his death in 1858 at the age of 48 years. The village was populated by shepherds from Bocognano during the migration of sheep to summer pastures. This explains the bocognanaise origin of old families in Afa. In summer, many Afaiens return to the village of Bocognano.

==== Creation of the commune ====
The creation of the commune was the result of a report by Pongérard during the session of the National Assembly of 25 July 1850 that created the commune of Afa.

The report read in part:

"Gentlemen, the communes of Valle-di-Mezzana and of Bocognano in the district of Ajaccio, Corsica department, have two portions of territory which not only have the status of enclaves, but the distance separating them from their respective communes is some Six Leagues. Since the two enclaves are contiguous and together have an area of 1.2 hectares with three groups of houses, and a population of about 350 souls, it seems appropriate to create a separate commune under the name of Affa."

"The inhabitants of these enclaves join with their Municipal Councils to ask for the maintenance of the current state of affairs. Most of the principle Administrators and regulations of the land registry demand the removal of these enclaves. There must necessarily be a distinct old commune, or to join them as is proposed in the course of the instruction to the commune of Sarrola. The first of these remedial measures is obviously more advantageous to the people, at least in the opinion of the Administrative Authorities and the elected councillors of the arrondissement and of the department. They appeared certain that the establishment of an administrative centre in the middle of nomadic populations today, would change their habits and lead to improvement in their Agriculture and Industry. Also they would become a source of well-being and prosperity."

"Bocognano and Valle-Mezzana who, in all these cases, must lose the enclaved territories, not in keeping the "Forte Une" elements of the municipal organisation. Not that this operation is not important for Bocognano who has administered an enclave of 1100 hectares for a long time and which will almost entirely be within the proposed commune. They will have nevertheless a territorial area of over 5,000 hectares and a population of more than 2,000 inhabitants. About Valle-Mezzana, they will only give up 115 hectares which are uninhabited."

"The formation of the new commune of Affa will modify the district of the canton which Bocognano is in. The administrative authorities, such as the Minister of Justice, have, in effect, been advised that it should be attributed to the canton of Sarrola-Carcopino. Moreover Affa is not large enough, nor has enough people for the loss of its territory to the canton of Bocognano to be a significant loss."

=== Contemporary era ===
1954: The canton of Ajaccio is created with the communes of: Afa, Ajaccio, Alata, Appin, Bastelicaccia, and Villanova.

1975: With the division of the island of Corsica into two departments, Afa passed into the department of Corse-du-Sud.

== Administration ==
List of Successive Mayors of Afa

From	To	Name	Party
2001	2026	Ange Pascal Miniconi	CSD

== Population ==
The inhabitants are called Afayens ([afajɛ̃]) or Afayennes ([afajɛn]) in French, afaghjinchi (singular: afaghjincu, afaghjinca) in Corsican, and afaianesi (singular: afaianese) in Italian.

Historical population
Year	Pop.	±% p.a.
1968	474	—
1975	667	+5.00%
1982	1,102	+7.44%
1990	1,726	+5.77%
1999	2,055	+1.96%
2007	2,655	+3.25%
2012	2,888	+1.70%
2017	3,133	+1.64%
2023	3,350	+1.12%
Source: INSEE

== Education ==
Afa has:

- a primary school and a public kindergarten, with a canteen in Murone. There are seven primary classes and two classes for preschool, for about two hundred students. The Afa school was opened in 1988 by Lionel Jospin, who was then Minister of Education.
- a public elementary school in Piscia Rossa.

The nearest secondary school education is at Baléone (Sarrola-Carcopino), less than 3 kilometres (2 mi) from the village, and the next nearest school is St. Paul's College High School in Ajaccio, within 7 kilometres (4 mi).

== Health ==
The town also has a pharmacy, a dentist, and a medical service staffed by nurses and doctors in a medical unit that has been present since about 2002.

== Sports ==
=== Football ===
The Afa Football Association (AFA) was formed of the merger between the USCA and the ARC on 18 June 1998 (220 members at its creation). To date, it is chaired by François Faggianelli who has held this position since June 2000.

In 2011 it had 400 members.

The village football club is the Afa Football Association, founded in 1998.

== Culture and heritage ==
=== Civil heritage ===
The war memorial is outside the City Hall, created by Noël Bonardi, a sculptor from Afa who has made statues everywhere in Corsica and whose studio is located in Afa.

=== Religious heritage ===
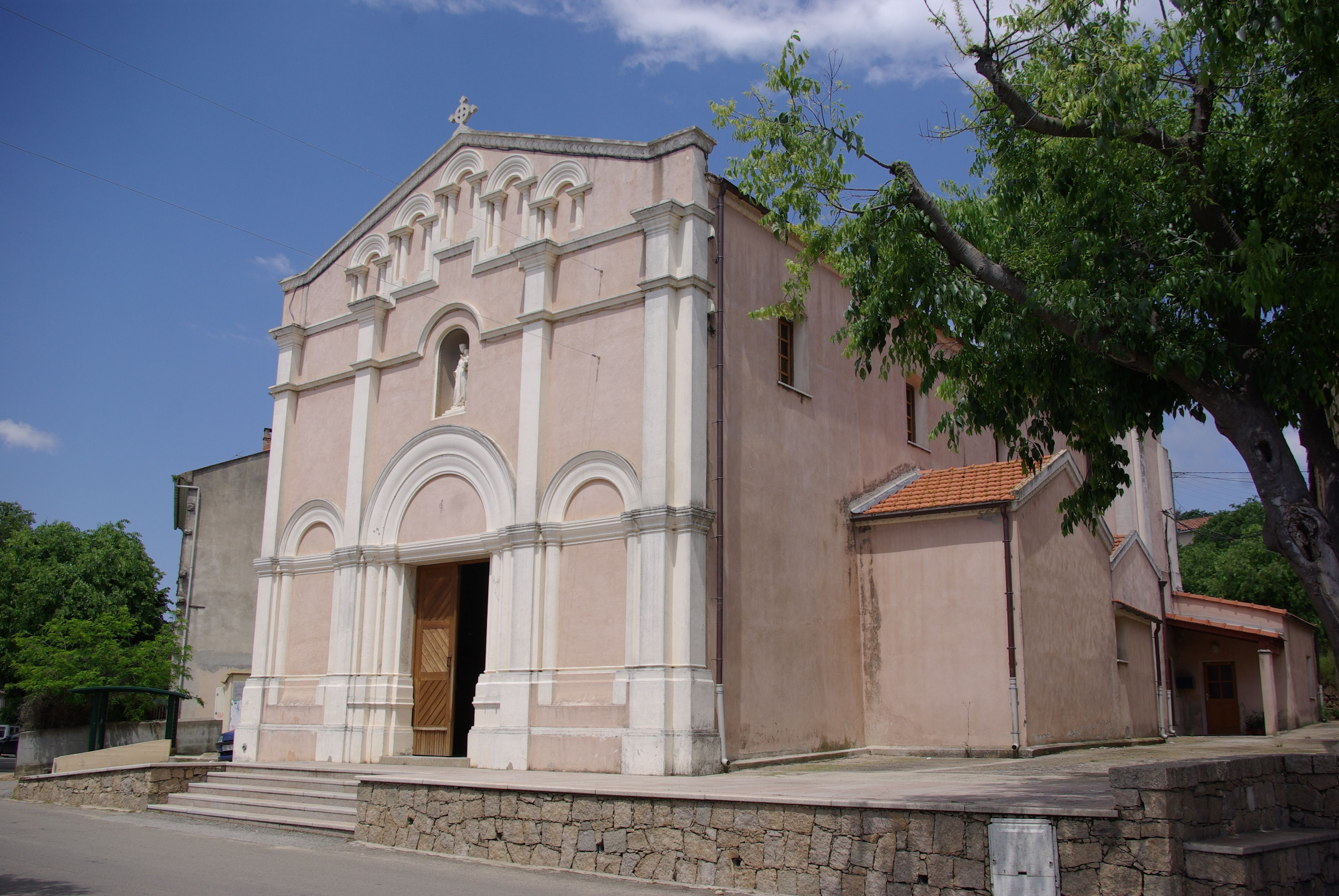
The Parish Church

- The Parish Church of St. Anthony of Padua has a table from the 17th century and:
  - A painting on restored canvas with a scene of a woman on foot begging with a child and a man standing (17th century) which is classified as a historic monument.

== Notable people linked to the commune ==
- Noël Bonardi, sculptor
- Antoine Baudoin Poggiale, chemist

== See also ==
- Communes of the Corse-du-Sud department
