= 2008 Tour de Corse =

Motor rally competition

2008 Tour de Corse 52ème Tour de Corse - Rallye de France
Round 13 of the 2008 World Rally Championship
← Previous event	Next event →
- Rally base: Ajaccio
- Dates run: October 10 – 12 2008
- Stages: 16 (359.02 km; 223.08 miles)
- Stage surface: Tarmac
- Overall distance: 1,094.28 km (679.95 miles)

Statistics
- Crews: 71 at start, 54 at finish

Overall results
- Overall winner: (France) Sébastien Loeb; Citroën Total World Rally Team

The 2008 Tour de Corse was the thirteenth round of the 2008 World Rally Championship season. The event was won by Citroën driver Sébastien Loeb for the fourth year in succession. It was his tenth victory of the season and gave him a fourteen-point lead in the drivers table with just two rallies left in the season. Ford driver Mikko Hirvonen finished in second place after team orders issued by the Ford team forced François Duval and Jari-Matti Latvala to drop behind him, in order to improve his championship hopes.

== Results ==
Pos.	Driver	Co-driver	Car	Time	Difference	Points
WRC
1.	(France) Sébastien Loeb	(Monaco) Daniel Elena	Citroën C4 WRC	3:42:58.0	0.0	10
2.	(Finland) Mikko Hirvonen	(Finland) Jarmo Lehtinen	Ford Focus RS WRC 08	3:46:22.7	3:24.7	8
3.	(Belgium) François Duval	(France) Patrick Pivato	Ford Focus RS WRC 08	3:46:29.6	3:31.6	6
4.	(Finland) Jari-Matti Latvala	(Finland) Miikka Anttila	Ford Focus RS WRC 07	3:46:35.5	3:37.5	5
5.	(Norway) Petter Solberg	(United Kingdom) Phil Mills	Subaru Impreza WRC2008	3:48:33.4	5:35.4	4
6.	(Australia) Chris Atkinson	(Belgium) Stéphane Prévot	Subaru Impreza WRC2008	3:49:08.4	6:10.4	3
7.	(Estonia) Urmo Aava	(Estonia) Kuldar Sikk	Citroën C4 WRC	3:50:23.2	7:25.2	2
8.	(United Kingdom) Matthew Wilson	(United Kingdom) Scott Martin	Ford Focus RS WRC 07	3:52:00.2	9:02.2	1
JWRC
1. (19.)	(Czech Republic) Martin Prokop	(Czech Republic) Jan Tománek	Citroën C2 S1600	4:04:43.9	0.0	10
2. (20.)	(France) Sébastien Ogier	(France) Julien Ingrassia	Citroën C2 S1600	4:05:01.6	17.7	8
3. (21.)	(France) Pierre Campana	(France) Samuel Teissier	Renault Clio R3	4:05:37.2	53.3	6

== Special Stages ==
All dates and times are CEST (UTC+2).

Day	Stage	Time	Name	Length	Winner	Time	Rally leader
1 (10 October)	SS1	9:18	Acqua Doria-Serra di Ferro 1	15.92 km	(France) Sébastien Loeb	9:27.4	(France) Sébastien Loeb
1 (10 October)	SS2	10:11	Portigliolo-Bocca Albitrina 1	16.62 km	(France) Sébastien Loeb	9:21.9	(France) Sébastien Loeb
1 (10 October)	SS3	11:09	Arbellara-Aullene 1	27.42 km	(France) Sébastien Loeb	15:51.4	(France) Sébastien Loeb
1 (10 October)	SS4	14:37	Acqua Doria-Serra di Ferro 2	15.92 km	(France) Sébastien Loeb	9:32.2	(France) Sébastien Loeb
1 (10 October)	SS5	15:30	Portigliolo-Bocca Albitrina 2	16.62 km	(France) Sébastien Loeb	9:22.5	(France) Sébastien Loeb
1 (10 October)	SS6	16:28	Arbellara-Aullene 2	27.42 km	(France) Sébastien Loeb	15:48.9	(France) Sébastien Loeb
2 (11 October)	SS7	8:48	Carbuccia-Scalella 1	21.88 km	(France) Sébastien Loeb	14:26.3	(France) Sébastien Loeb
2 (11 October)	SS8	10:21	Calcatoggio Du Liamone 1	24.95 km	(France) Sébastien Loeb	17:09.2	(France) Sébastien Loeb
2 (11 October)	SS9	11:19	Appricciani-Coggia 1	14:37 km	(France) Sébastien Loeb	9:23.9	(France) Sébastien Loeb
2 (11 October)	SS10	14:02	Carbuccia-Scalella 2	21.88 km	(France) Sébastien Loeb	14:33.6	(France) Sébastien Loeb
2 (11 October)	SS11	15:35	Calcatoggio Du Liamone 2	24.95 km	(France) Sébastien Loeb	17:08.0	(France) Sébastien Loeb
2 (11 October)	SS12	16:33	Appricciani-Coggia 2	14.37 km	(Belgium) François Duval	9:21.3	(France) Sébastien Loeb
3 (12 October)	SS13	8:43	Agosta-Pont De Calzola 1	31.81 km	(France) Sébastien Loeb	19:10.2	(France) Sébastien Loeb
3 (12 October)	SS14	9:36	Pietra Rossa-Verghia 1	26.32 km	(France) Sébastien Loeb	16:25.6	(France) Sébastien Loeb
3 (12 October)	SS15	12:14	Agosta-Pont De Calzola 2	31.81 km	(Finland) Jari-Matti Latvala (France) Sébastien Loeb	19:22.0	(France) Sébastien Loeb
3 (12 October)	SS16	13:07	Pietra Rossa-Verghia 2	26.32 km	(Finland) Mikko Hirvonen	16:27.4	(France) Sébastien Loeb

== Championship standings after the event ==
=== Drivers' championship ===
Pos	Driver	MON (Monaco)	SWE (Sweden)	MEX (Mexico)	ARG (Argentina)	JOR (Jordan)	ITA (Italy)	GRC (Greece)	TUR (Turkey)	FIN (Finland)	GER (Germany)	NZL (New Zealand)	ESP (Spain)	FRA (France)	JPN (Japan)	GBR (United Kingdom)	Pts
1	(France) Sébastien Loeb	1	Ret	1	1	10	1	1	3	1	1	1	1	1			106
2	(Finland) Mikko Hirvonen	2	2	4	5	1	2	3	1	2	4	3	3	2			92
3	(Spain) Dani Sordo	11	6	17	3	2	5	5	4	4	2	2	2	Ret			59
4	(Australia) Chris Atkinson	3	21	2	2	3	6	Ret	13	3	6	Ret	7	6			45
5	(Finland) Jari-Matti Latvala	12	1	3	15	7	3	7	2	39	9	Ret	6	4			42
6	(Norway) Petter Solberg	5	4	12	Ret	Ret	10	2	6	6	5	4	5	5			40
7	(Belgium) François Duval	4									3	Ret	4	3			22
8	(Norway) Henning Solberg	9	13	5	Ret	4	7	8	5	5	7	9	11	15			22
9	(Italy) Gigi Galli	6	3	Ret	7	8	4	Ret	Ret	Ret	Ret	Inj	Inj	Inj			17
10	(Estonia) Urmo Aava		18			Ret	8	4	Ret	16	8	5	35	7			13
11	(United Kingdom) Matthew Wilson	10	Ret	6	Ret	5	12	6	7	9	12	17	9	8			13
12	(Argentina) Federico Villagra			7	6	6	14	13	9	Ret		8	12				9
13	(Zimbabwe) Conrad Rautenbach	Ret	16	16	4	26	13	10	8	10	10	Ret	Ret	14			6
14	(Norway) Andreas Mikkelsen		5				Ret		19	12	11		8	11			5
15	(Finland) Toni Gardemeister	Ret	7	Ret	Ret	Ret	Ret	9	Ret	8	10	7	13	13			5
16	(Sweden) Per-Gunnar Andersson	8	Ret	Ret	24	Ret	9	11	Ret	Ret	15	6	32	17			4
17	(France) Jean-Marie Cuoq	7															2
17	(Finland) Matti Rantanen									7							2
19	(Finland) Juho Hänninen		8					21		13		14	29	24			1
19	(France) Sébastien Ogier			8		11	22			36	19		Ret	20			1
19	(Austria) Andreas Aigner		31		8			14	11	Ret		Ret					1
Pos	Driver	MON (Monaco)	SWE (Sweden)	MEX (Mexico)	ARG (Argentina)	JOR (Jordan)	ITA (Italy)	GRC (Greece)	TUR (Turkey)	FIN (Finland)	GER (Germany)	NZL (New Zealand)	ESP (Spain)	FRA (France)	JPN (Japan)	GBR (United Kingdom)	Pts

Key
Colour	Result
Gold	Winner
Silver	2nd place
Bronze	3rd place
Green	Points finish
Blue	Non-points finish
Blue	Non-classified finish (NC)
Purple	Did not finish (Ret)
Black	Excluded (EX)
Black	Disqualified (DSQ)
White	Did not start (DNS)
White	Cancelled (C)
Blank	Withdrew entry from the event (WD)

=== Manufacturers' championship ===
Rank	Team	Event															Total points
Rank	Team	MON (Monaco)	SWE (Sweden)	MEX (Mexico)	ARG (Argentina)	JOR (Jordan)	ITA (Italy)	GRC (Greece)	TUR (Turkey)	FIN (Finland)	GER (Germany)	NZL (New Zealand)	ESP (Spain)	FRA (France)	JPN (Japan)	GBR (United Kingdom)	Total points
1	(France) Citroën Total World Rally Team	11	4	10	16	9	14	15	11	15	18	18	18	10	-	-	169
2	(United Kingdom) BP Ford World Rally Team	8	18	11	7	13	14	10	18	9	7	6	11	14	-	-	146
3	(Japan) Subaru World Rally Team	10	6	9	8	6	3	8	3	9	7	5	6	7	-	-	87
4	(United Kingdom) Stobart M-Sport Ford Rally Team	8	8	3	3	7	5	3	4	4	6	0	4	7	-	-	62
5	(Argentina) Munchi's Ford World Rally Team	0	0	6	4	4	2	0	3	0	0	3	0	0	-	-	22
6	(Japan) Suzuki World Rally Team	2	3	0	1	0	1	3	0	2	1	7	0	1	-	-	21

=== Junior championship ===
Pos	Driver	MEX (Mexico)	JOR (Jordan)	ITA (Italy)	FIN (Finland)	GER (Germany)	ESP (Spain)	FRA (France)	Pts
1	(France) Sébastien Ogier	1	1	5		1	Ret	2	42
2	(Germany) Aaron Burkart	4		3	4	2	3	5	34
3	(Czech Republic) Martin Prokop	7		10	1	Ret	1	1	32
4	(Republic of Ireland) Shaun Gallagher	6	2	4	5	4	4		30
5	(Poland) Michał Kościuszko	3	Ret	1	3		9	Ret	22
6	(Italy) Alessandro Bettega		Ret	2	Ret	3	2	Ret	22
7	(Sweden) Patrik Sandell	5	Ret	7	2		5	6	22
8	(Estonia) Jaan Mölder	2	Ret	9	Ret		6	11	11
9	(Italy) Stefano Albertini		5	6	13	10	7	9	9
10	(Luxembourg) Gilles Schammel		3	12	7	Ret	Ret	10	8
11	(Italy) Simone Bertolotti		6	Ret	10	5	8	Ret	8
12	(Germany) Florian Niegel		4	Ret	9	8	10	7	8
13	(Netherlands) Kevin Abbring		Ret	Ret	6	6	11	8	7
14	(France) Pierre Campana							3	6
15	(France) Pierre Marché							4	5
16	(Italy) Andrea Cortinovis		7	11	DNS	7	DNS	DNS	4
17	(Netherlands) Hans Weijs, Jr.		Ret	8	8	Ret	Ret	12	2
18	(Italy) Francesco Fanari	8	9	13	12	9	Ret		1
19	(Serbia) Miloš Komljenović	Ret	8	Ret	11				1
Pos	Driver	MEX (Mexico)	JOR (Jordan)	ITA (Italy)	FIN (Finland)	GER (Germany)	ESP (Spain)	FRA (France)	Pts
