= Tower of Capu di Muru =

Genoese coastal defence tower in Corsica

- torra di Capu di Muru (Corsican)
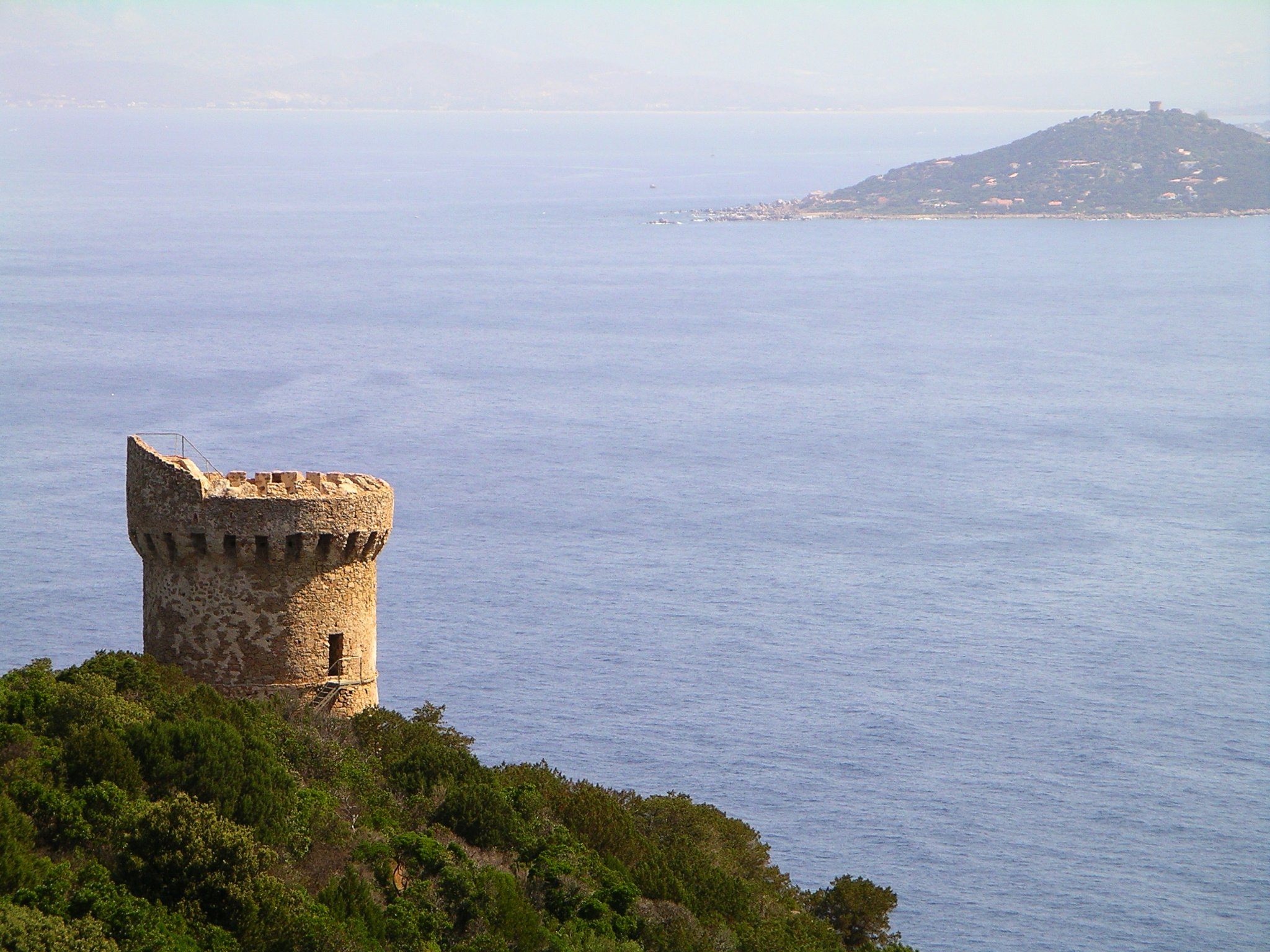

- Location within Corsica
- 41°44′59″N 8°40′35″E

History
- Built: 1600

Monument historique
- Designated: 22 April 1994
- Reference no.: PA00132603

The Tower of Capu di Muru (Corsican: torra di Capu di Muru, pronounced [ˈtɔrra di ˈkapu di ˈmuru]; French: tour de Capu di Muru) is a Genoese tower located in the commune of Coti-Chiavari, on the west coast of Corsica. The tower sits at an elevation of 100 metres (330 ft) on the Capu di Muru headland.

The tower was built in around 1600. It was one of a series of coastal defences constructed by the Republic of Genoa between 1530 and 1620 to stem the attacks by Barbary pirates. In 1994 the tower was listed as one of the official historical monuments of France.

The tower is owned and maintained by the Collectivité Territoriale de Corse in an agreement with the French government agency, the Conservatoire du littoral. The agency plans to purchase 215 hectares (530 acres) of the headland and as of 2017 had acquired 212 hectares (520 acres).

== See also ==
- List of Genoese towers in Corsica
