= Torra di Pelusella =

Genoese coastal defence tower in Corsica

Tower of Pelusella
- Torra di Pelusella (Corsican)
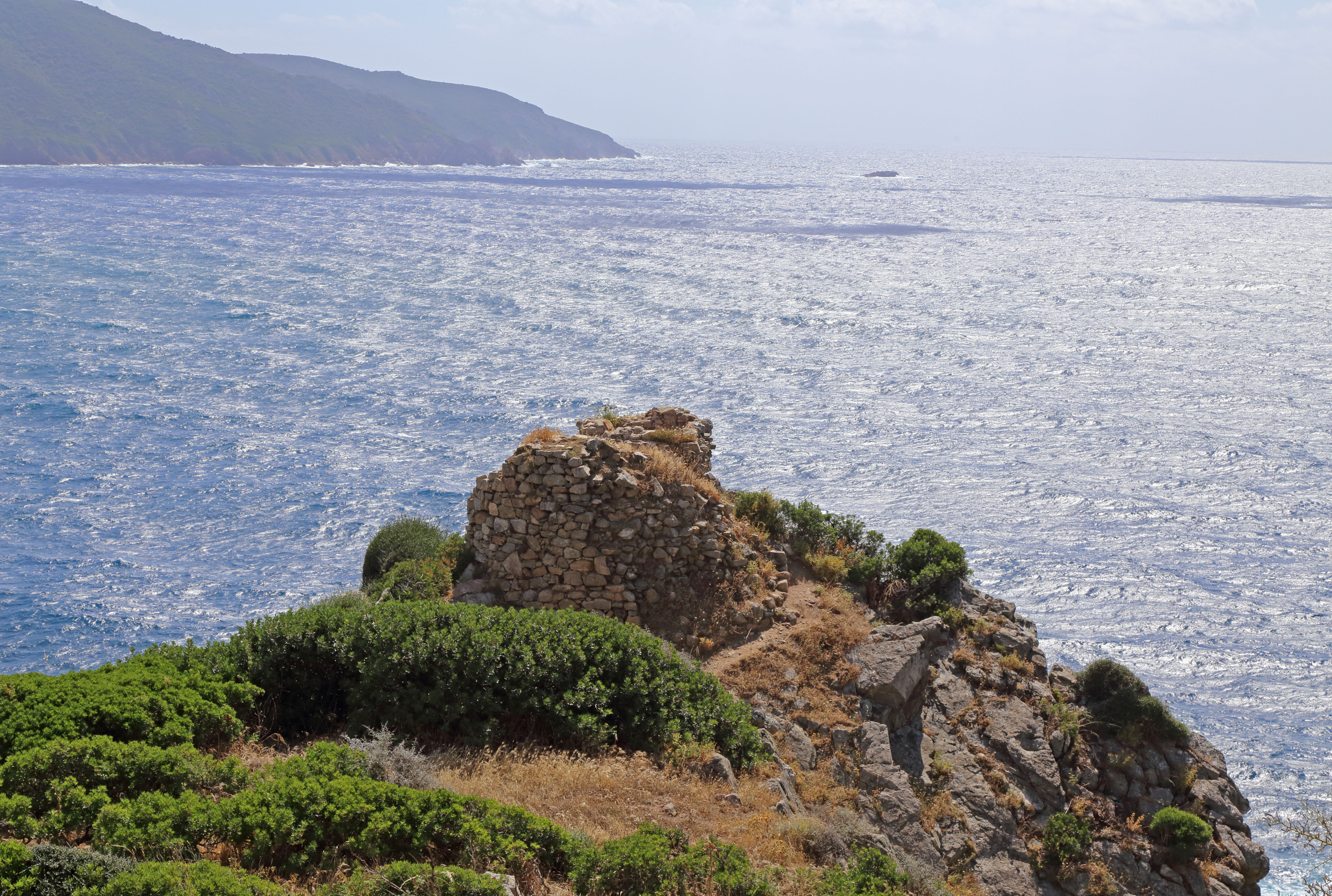

- Location within Corsica
- 41°59′34″N 8°39′32″E

History
- Built: Second half 16th century

The Tower of Pelusella (Corsican: Torra di Pelusella) is a ruined Genoese tower located in the commune of Appietto on the west coast of Corsica. The ruins sit on a headland at the northern end of the Golfe de Lava. Only part of the base survives.

The tower was built in the second half of the 16th century. It was one of a series of coastal defences constructed by the Republic of Genoa between 1530 and 1620 to stem the attacks by Barbary pirates.

== See also ==
- List of Genoese towers in Corsica
