= Canton of Gravona-Prunelli =

Coordinates: 41.98°N 8.79°E

The canton of Gravona-Prunelli is an administrative division of the Corse-du-Sud department, southeastern France. It was created at the French canton reorganisation which came into effect in March 2015. Its seat is in Afa. It takes its name from the Gravona and Prunelli rivers, which both flow through the canton.

It consists of the following communes:

1. Afa
2. Appietto
3. Bastelica
4. Bocognano
5. Carbuccia
6. Cuttoli-Corticchiato
7. Ocana
8. Peri
9. Sarrola-Carcopino
10. Tavaco
11. Tavera
12. Tolla
13. Ucciani
14. Valle-di-Mezzana
15. Vero
