= Corsican wine =

Regional French wine

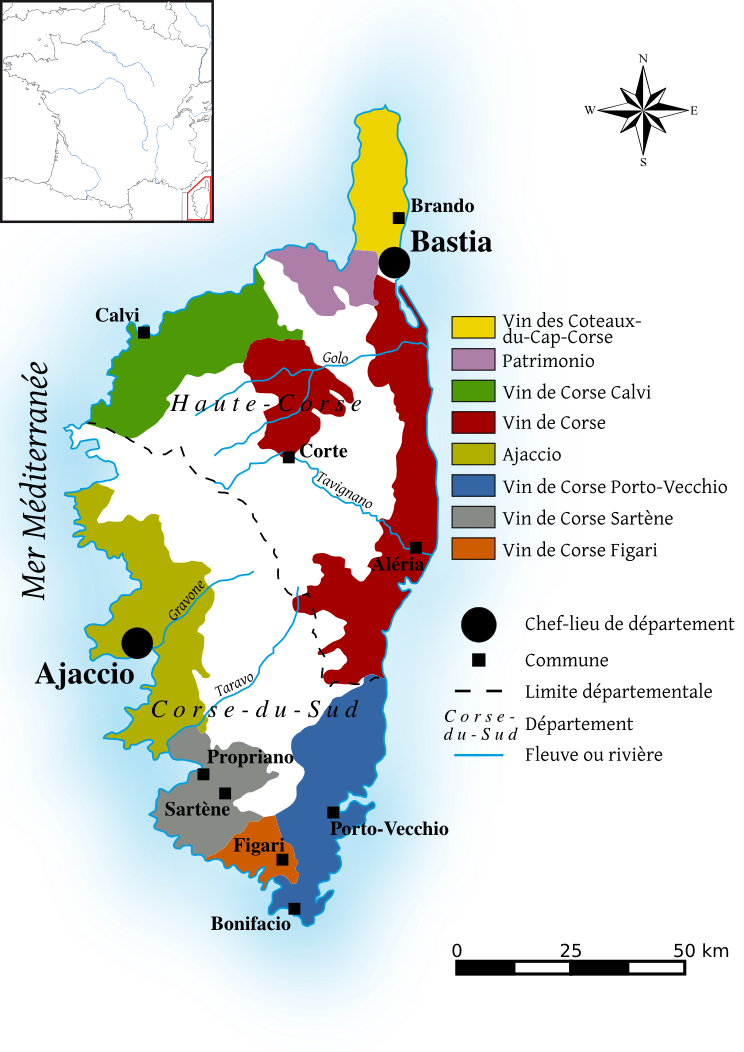
Wine-growing areas on Corsica and the location of the various appellations.

Corsica wine is wine made on the Mediterranean island of Corsica. Located 90 km west of Italy, 170 km southeast of France and 11 km north of the island of Sardinia, the island is a territorial collectivity of France, but many of the region's winemaking traditions and its grape varieties are Italian in origin. The region's viticultural history can be traced to the island's settlement by Phoceans traders in 570 BC in what is now the commune of Aléria. In the 18th century, the island came under the control of France. Following the independence of Algeria from French rule, many Algerian Pieds-Noirs immigrated to Corsica and began planting vineyards. Between 1960 and 1976 the vineyard area in Corsica increased fourfold. In 1968, Patrimonio was established as Corsica's first Appellation d'origine contrôlée (AOC). Today, Corsica has nine AOC regions including the island-wide designation Vin de Corse AOC. The majority of the wine exported from Corsica falls under the Vin de pays designation Vin de Pays de l'Île de Beauté (Country wine from the Island of Beauty). The three leading grape varieties of the region are Nielluccio (Sangiovese), known as the spice wine of France, Sciacarello and Vermentino.

== History ==
The island of Corsica was settled by Phoceans traders shortly after their founding of Massalia on the southeastern coast of France. The Phoceans were active wine growers, cultivating indigenous vines and cuttings brought from abroad. During the late 7th and early 8th century AD, the island came under Islamic rule. Wine production was severely limited due to the Islamic prohibition of alcohol. In the early Middle Ages, Corsica first came under the rule of the city of Pisa in the Tuscany region, then in the 13th century under that of the Republic of Genoa. During this time some ampelographers believe that a clone of the Sangiovese grape was introduced to the island which became Nielluccio.

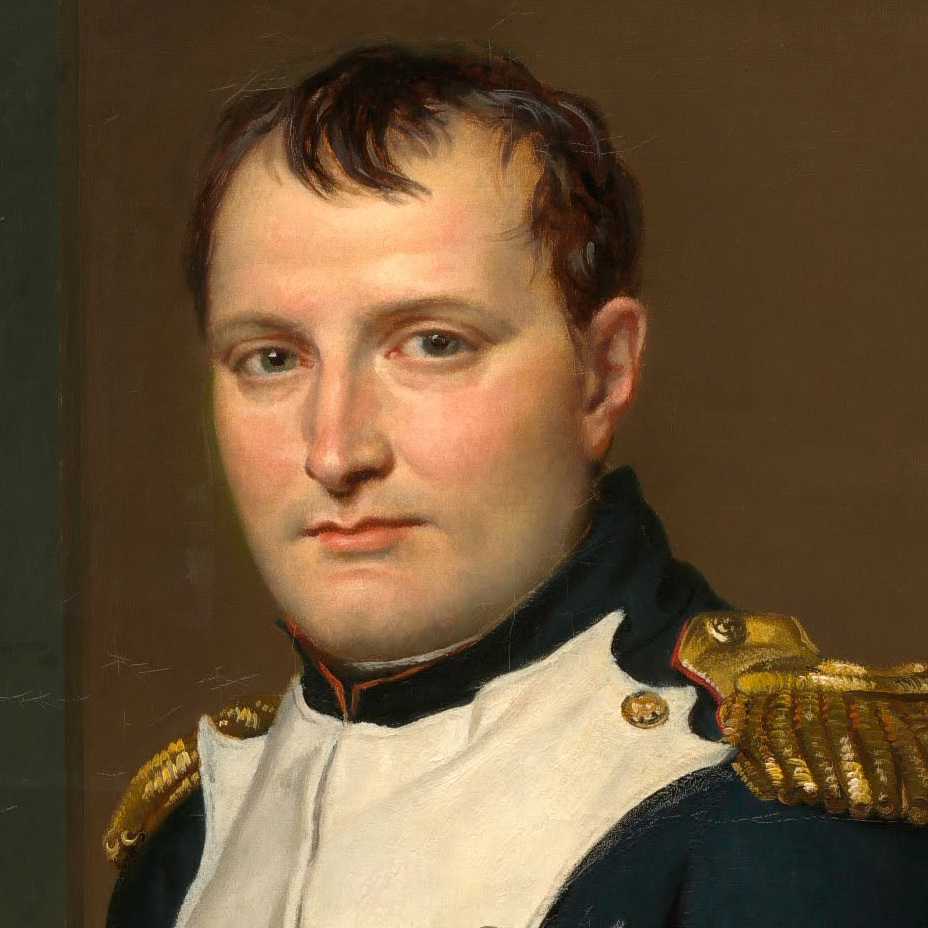
The future French emperor Napoleon Bonaparte was born to a Corsican winemaking family in Ajaccio.

Over the next 500 years, the Genoese established strict laws governing the harvest and winemaking practices of the island. They also banned all exports of Corsican wines to any port outside of Genoa. The most sought-after wines from Corsica were described as being made in the "Greek style" from the Cap Corse region. In 1769, a year after the Genoese ceded control of the island to the French, the Scottish writer James Boswell praised the diversity and quality of Corsican wines, comparing them favorably to the wines of Malaga and Frontignan. That same year, the future French emperor Napoleon Bonaparte was born in the Corsican city of Ajaccio to a wine-producing family. Under Napoleon's rule, Corsica was allowed to export wine and tobacco duty-free across the French Empire.

In the 19th century, the Corsican government launched several efforts to improve the nation's economy by promoting Corsica's wine industry. These efforts included the widespread planting of the indigenous Sciacarello grape and the construction of a large cellar near the city of Vizzavona, which was located on the highest point on the railroad line that linked the east coast city of Bastia with the capital city of Ajaccio. The phylloxera epidemic of the late 19th century dealt a crippling blow to the Corsican wine industry, and was followed by a period of mass depopulation as Corsicans emigrated to other countries. The Algerian war of Independence ushered in a new period of growth as French pieds-noirs immigrated to Corsica and began new plantings. During this time, the number of vineyards increased fourfold. The overall quality of Corsican wine was poor due to the emphasis on quantity over quality, with Corsica becoming a prominent contributor to Europe's wine lake problem. In the 1980s, the European Union began issuing subsidies to encourage the uprooting of vines and to renew focus on limited yields and quality wine production. By 2003, these programs had contributed to a reduction of over 17,300 acres (7,000 ha) in the number of vineyard plantings in Corsica, as well as the introduction of modern winemaking techniques and equipment such as temperature-controlled fermentation tanks.

== Climate and geography ==
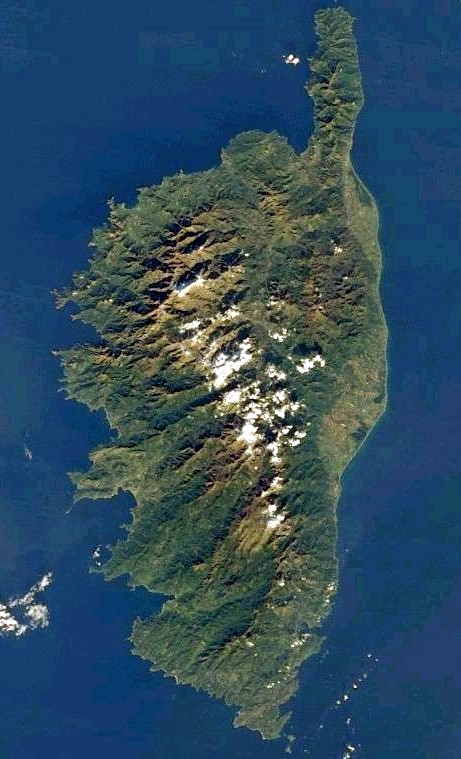
Most of Corsica's vineyards are located around the coast.

The island of Corsica is the most mountainous island in the Mediterranean. The climate is warmer and drier than in mainland France. During the peak growing month of July, the mean average temperature is 74 °F (23 °C). The average annual rainfall for most Corsica's wine growing regions is 29 inches (740 mm) and 2.6 inches (66 mm) during the harvest month of September. Very little rain falls during months of August and September allowing for a dry, rot-free harvest for most vintages. Corsica averages around 2,750 hours of sunshine a year, with the nearby sea absorbing most of the heat during the day and radiating it back to the island at night. This creates a more consistent temperature and sharply reduces the diurnal temperature variation. Throughout the mountainous terrain there are several mesoclimates created by the differing degrees of altitude, latitude and maritime influences.

There are several different soil types found in the wine growing regions of Corsica. In the northern region consisting of the Cap Corse peninsula the soil is mainly schist. Just south of the Cap Corse is the limestone-rich chalk and clay soil of the Patrimonio region. Along the west coast, the soil contains a high concentration of granite. The vineyards planted on the east coast of the island between the cities of Solenzara and Bastia are planted mostly on marly sand.

== Wine regions ==
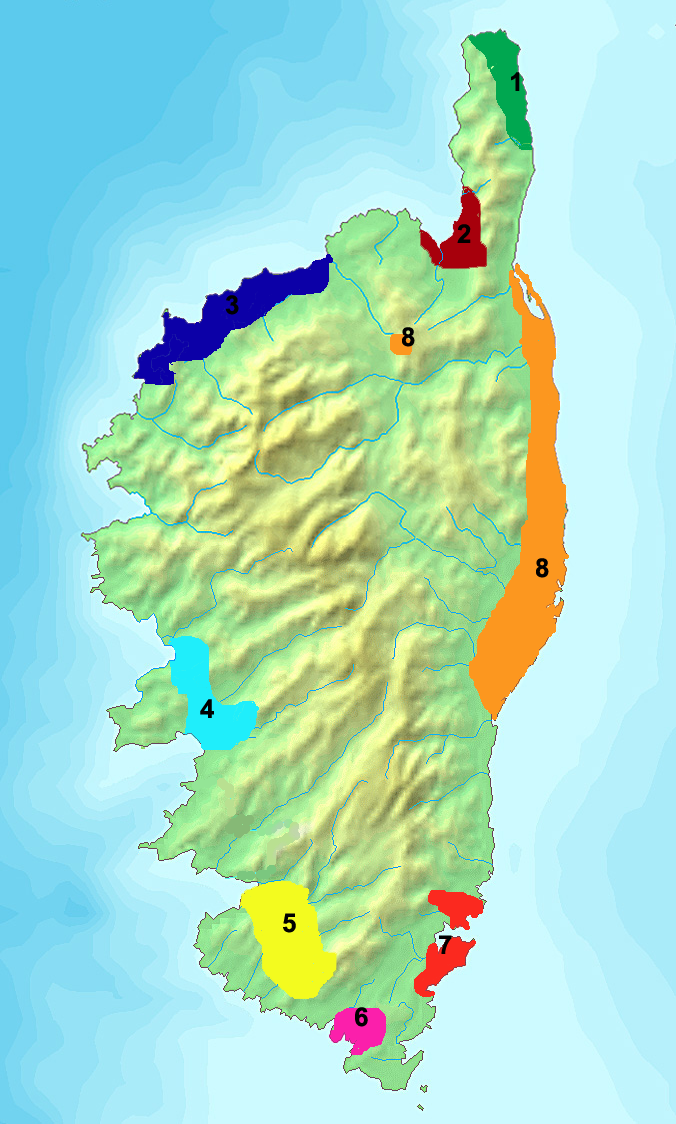
Corsica's wine regions: (1) Cap Corse, (2) Patrimonio, (3) Calvi, (4) Ajaccio, (5) Sartène, (6) Figari, (7) Porto-Vecchio, (8) Greater Vin de Corse region. The Muscat du Cap Corse region overlaps with part of the Cap Corse and Patrimonio regions.

Corsica has nine AOC regions and an island-wide vin de pays designation Vin de Pays de l'Île de Beauté that accounts for two thirds of the island's entire wine production. The Patrimonio region on the north coast was the first to receive AOC designation when it was established in 1968. On the west coast is a large region centered around the island's capital city of Ajaccio which includes some of Corsica's highest elevated vineyard land. The generic Vin de Corse AOC covers the entire island and includes the smaller sub-regions of Vin de Corse-Coteaux du Cap Corse, Vin de Corse-Calvi, Vin de Corse-Figari, Vin de Corse-Porto Vecchio and Vin de Corse-Sartène AOCs covers specific regions and generally mandates lower yields than the Vin de Corse AOC. The Muscat du Cap Corse AOC includes the vin doux naturel wines produced in the northern peninsular tip of the island.

=== Patrimonio ===
The Patrimonio wine region is located on the northern coast of the island, west of the city of Bastia, on the chalk- and clay-based soils around the city of Patrimonio. The Nielluccio grape is the main variety and usually composes up to 95% of the regions AOC red and rosé wines. The white wines of the regions are often 100% Vermentino. In 2002, the region changed it AOC regulations on the encépagement (grape composition) of the wines to where at least 90% of the red wines and 75% of the rosés must be Nielluccio, with Grenache, Sciacarello and Vermentino permitted to round out the rest. According to wine expert Tom Stevenson, the wines from this region typically drink at their peak within 1–3 years after vintage.

=== Ajaccio ===
The Ajaccio wine region includes the vineyards surrounding the southwestern coastal town of Ajaccio. The region produces mostly medium-bodied red and rosé wine made primarily from Sciacarello. White wines from Ajaccio are often blends of Ugni blanc and Vermentino. Under AOC regulations, the red wines must contain at least 40% Sciacarello, which together with Barbarossa, Nielluccio and Vermentino must compose a minimum 60% of the total wine blend. The remaining maximum of 40% can come from a blend of Grenache, Cinsault and Carignan-though Carignan is relegated to comprising no more than 15% of the blend. Stevenson notes that these wines typically have the same longevity as the wines from Patrimonio.

=== Vin de Corse ===
This region-wide designation and its sub-regions account for around 45% of all AOC wines produced in Corsica. Red and rosé wines here must include at least a 50% composition of Nielluccio, Sciacarello and Grenache. The white wines are composed primarily of Vermentino. This region includes many of Corsica's oldest established wineries that were founded in the 1960s on the island's eastern plains. The Vin de Corse-Coteaux du Cap Corse is located on the northern peninsular tip of the island and produces sweet wines made from Muscat and Aleatico. The wines made from the latter are commonly labeled as Rappu wine.

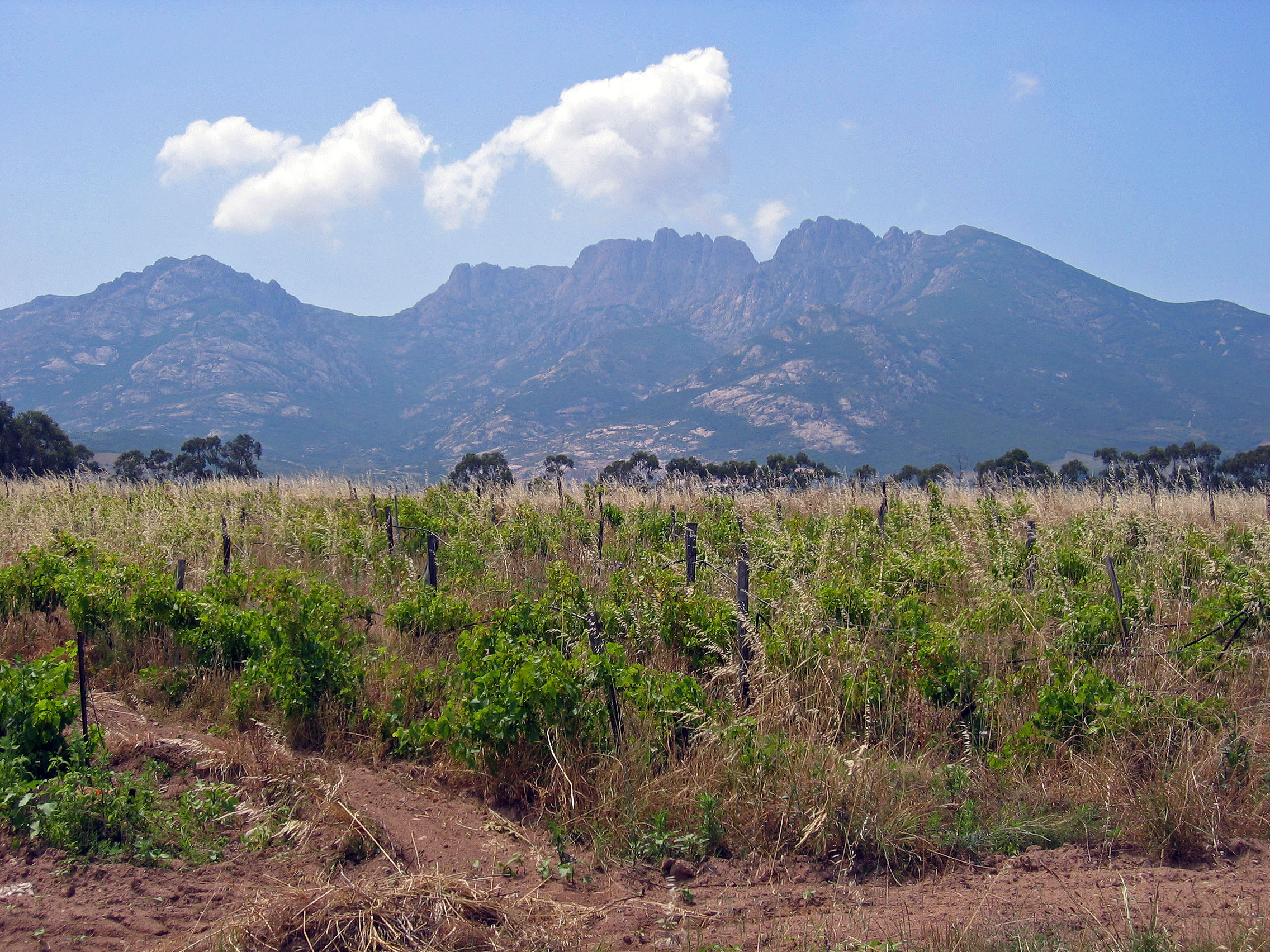
A vineyard in the Figari region of south west Corsica.

The sub-region of Vin de Corse-Calvi is located around the northwestern coastal town of Calvi, located north of Ajaccio. The wines of this region must follow the same AOC encepagment as the greater Vin de Corse, with the red and rosé wines containing at least 50% Grenache, Nielluccio, and Sciacarello, and no more than 50% of combined blend of Barbarossa, Carignan, Cinsault, Mourvedre, Syrah, and Vermentino. Carignan and Vermentino are further relegated to comprising no more than 20% of the entire blend. The white wines must contain at least 75% Vermentino, with Ugni blanc permitted to be included in the blend. The sub-region of Vin de Corse-Porto Vecchio is located on the southeastern coast around the city of Porto Vecchio. The sub-region of Vin de Corse-Figari is situated around the southwestern town of Figari, located between Sartène and Porto Vecchio. The sub-region of Vin de Corse-Sartène is located northwest of Figari and is centered around the town of Sartène.

Around the communes of Figari and Sartène are the few remaining vines of Bariadorgia/Carcajolo blanc remaining.

=== Muscat du Cap Corse ===
The Muscat du Cap Corse region includes primarily the northern peninsular tip and overlaps with the Vin de Corse Coteaux du Cap Corse AOC as well as five communes that produces wines in the Patrimonio AOC. The sweet dessert wine from the Cap Corse region is produced in the vin doux naturel style and is composed entirely of Muscat Blanc à Petits Grains.

== Viticulture and winemaking ==
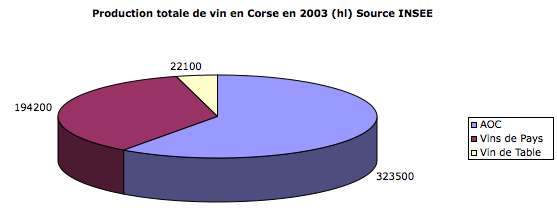
A 2003 breakdown of the amount of AOC Corsican wine is produced compared to Vin de Pays and Vin de Table.

The average elevation of vineyards in Corsica is 300 metres (1,000 ft) above sea levels where they are susceptible to strong winds. Vines were traditionally pruned to a goblet style, but modern viticultural practice and mechanical harvesting have encouraged more widespread use of single guyot and cordon de royat training styles. Vines are typically planted to a density average of 1,000 vines per acre (2,500 vines per hectare). The use of irrigation is prohibited in all AOC regions. Vineyards in Corsica are prone to occasional cicadelle attacks, which makes the vines susceptible to the phytoplasmic grape disease Flavescence dorée. Additional viticultural hazards include downy mildew and powdery mildew.

The European Union grant programs have encouraged many Corsican wineries to upgrade their facilities with temperature controlled stainless steel fermentation tanks. This allows the white and rosé wines from this warmer climate wine region to be fermented cool at between 64–68 °F (18–20 °C). Reds are often fermented in excess of 86 °F (30 °C) though some winemakers have experimented with cooler fermentation. Rosés are produced using the saignée method with malolactic fermentation being intentionally suppressed (as they usually are with Corsican whites as well). Red wines normally will go through malolactic fermentation and spend some time aging in oak barrels, though the use of new oak and extended oak aging has been a relatively recent development in Corsican winemaking. The white wines of Corsica are rarely exposed to oak, though some winemakers have experimented with making a Burgundian or Muscadet style wine from Vermentino which includes barrel fermentation and significant amount of lees stirring.

=== Reintroduction of old grape varieties ===
In 2007, ampelographers discovered through DNA testing that the Licronaxu bianco and its color mutation grapevine Licronaxu nero growing on the nearby island of Sardinia were actually the old Corsican wine grape Brustiano bianco. This discovery has allowed for the grape's reintroduction to Corsica where it is often blended with Vermentino, Biancu Gentile and Scimiscià.
