= Ucciani =

Commune in Corsica, France

- Commune
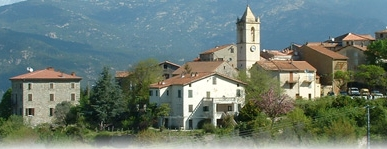
- A general view of Ucciani
- Location of Ucciani
- Location within France Location within Corsica
- Coordinates: 42°02′42″N 8°58′45″E
- Country: France
- Region: Corsica
- Department: Corse-du-Sud
- Arrondissement: Ajaccio
- Canton: Gravona-Prunelli
- Intercommunality: Celavu-Prunelli

Government
  - Mayor (2020–2026): Jean-Luc Giocanti
- Area^{1}: 28.36 km^{2} (10.95 sq mi)
- Elevation: 450 m (1,480 ft)
- Highest elevation: 1,628 m (5,341 ft)
- Lowest elevation: 259 m (850 ft)
- Population (2023): 504
  - Density: 17.8/km^{2} (46.0/sq mi)
- Time zone: UTC+01:00 (CET)
  - Summer (DST): UTC+02:00 (CEST)
- INSEE/Postal code: 2A330 /20133
- ^{1} French Land Register data, which excludes lakes, ponds, glaciers > 1 km^{2} (0.386 sq mi or 247 acres) and river estuaries.

Ucciani is a commune in the Corse-du-Sud department of France on the island of Corsica.

== Population ==
Historical population
Year	Pop.	±% p.a.
1968	393	—
1975	324	−2.72%
1982	285	−1.82%
1990	310	+1.06%
1999	389	+2.55%
2007	442	+1.61%
2012	468	+1.15%
2017	501	+1.37%
2023	504	+0.10%
Source: INSEE

== See also ==
- Communes of the Corse-du-Sud department
