= Lava (river) =

- Location within Corsica Location within France
- Native name: Ruisseau de Lava (French)

Location
- Country: France
- Region: Corsica
- Department: Corse-du-Sud

Physical characteristics
- Mouth: Mediterranean Sea
  - coordinates: 41.9936°N 8.6668°E
- Length: 12.63 kilometres (7.85 mi)

The Lava (French: Ruisseau de Lava) is a coastal stream in the west of the department of Corse-du-Sud, Corsica, France.

== Course ==
The Lava is 12.63 kilometres (7.85 mi) long. It flows through the commune of Appietto. It rises to the west of the 814 metres (2,671 ft) Punta Pastinaca and flows west past the village of Appietto to Portu Provenzale. When it reaches the sea the Lava turns to the north and flows behind the beach for a short distance before turning to the sea. In winter, the Lava flows into the sea. In summer it can cut through the beach during heavy rains. The Köppen climate classification is Csb : Warm-summer Mediterranean climate.

== Natura 2000 site ==
The Golfe de Lava is classified as a Natura 2000 site covering 150 hectares (370 acres) between the Punta Pelusella, a rocky hill, to the north and a low sandy terrace to the south beside the Lava stream. The site is under high pressure from tourists with motorized vehicles in the summer. Footbridges and boardwalks have been installed to let the public access the beach all year without disturbing the flow of the stream, the plants and wildlife. Flora include toadflax (Linaria flava), cottonrose (Filago tyrrhenica), Brompton stock (Matthiola incana) and tamarix. Fauna include European pond turtle (Emys orbicularis), osprey (Pandion haliaetus), European leaf-toed gecko (Euleptes europaea) and Hermann's tortoise (Testudo hermanni).

Part of the site, the Dune du Golfe de Lava, has been designated a Zone naturelle d'intérêt écologique, faunistique et floristique (ZNIEFF). It covers 3.51 hectares (8.7 acres) and is bounded to the north by the mouth of the Lava. It consists of a secondary coastal dune and the thicket of coastal mastic located behind the beach. The dune holds sparse vegetation characteristic of this type of environment in the Mediterranean. The three-horned stock (Matthiola tricuspidata) and Linaria flava subsp. sardoa are protected in France.

== Tributaries ==
The following streams (ruisseaux) are tributaries of the Lava (ordered by length) and sub-tributaries:

- Loriaggiu: 7 km (4.3 mi)
  - San Gavinu: 3 km (1.9 mi)
    - Grugnellu: 2 km (1.2 mi)
  - Muchiesi: 2 km (1.2 mi)
  - l'Albetronu: 2 km (1.2 mi)
    - Cavucellu: 1 km (0.62 mi)
- Verginaccia: 3 km (1.9 mi)
- Monte Rossu: 2 km (1.2 mi)
- Forcalu: 2 km (1.2 mi)
- San Silvestro: 2 km (1.2 mi)
- Ficarella: 1 km (0.62 mi)
- Vita: 1 km (0.62 mi)
- la Scopa: 1 km (0.62 mi)
- Pedone: 1 km (0.62 mi)
- Petra Bianca: 1 km (0.62 mi)
- Sant'Andrea: 1 km (0.62 mi)

== Sources ==
- "940014118, Dune du Golfe de Lava" (PDF), DREAL Corse (in French), Paris: INPN, SPN-MNHN, p. 8
- Golfe de Lava (PDF) (in French), CAPA: Communauté d'Agglomération du Pays Ajaccien
- "Relation: Ruisseau de Lava (9336617)", OpenStreetMap
- "Ruisseau de Lava, Département de la Corse-du-Sud, Corse, France", Mindat
- "Ruisseau de Lava", Sandre (in French)
