= Communauté d'agglomération du Pays Ajaccien =

Pays Ajaccien
- Communauté d'agglomération
- Location of Pays Ajaccien within the department
- Coordinates: 41°57′N 08°45′E
- Country: France
- Region: Corsica
- Department: Corse-du-Sud
- No. of communes: {{{nbcomm}}}
- Established: 2001
- Area: 268.8 km^{2} (103.8 sq mi)
- Population (2021): 91,202
  - Density: 339.3/km^{2} (878.8/sq mi)
- Website: www.ca-ajaccien.corsica

Communauté d'agglomération du Pays Ajaccien is the communauté d'agglomération, an intercommunal structure, centred on the city of Ajaccio. It is located in the Corse-du-Sud department, in the Corsica region, southeastern France. Created in 2001, its seat is in Ajaccio. Its area is 268.8 km^{2}. Its population was 91,202 in 2021, of which 73,822 in Ajaccio proper.

== Composition ==
The communauté d'agglomération consists of the following 10 communes:

1. Afa
2. Ajaccio
3. Alata
4. Appietto
5. Cuttoli-Corticchiato
6. Peri
7. Sarrola-Carcopino
8. Tavaco
9. Valle-di-Mezzana
10. Villanova
