= Sciacarello =

Variety of grape

Sciaccarello
- Grape (Vitis)
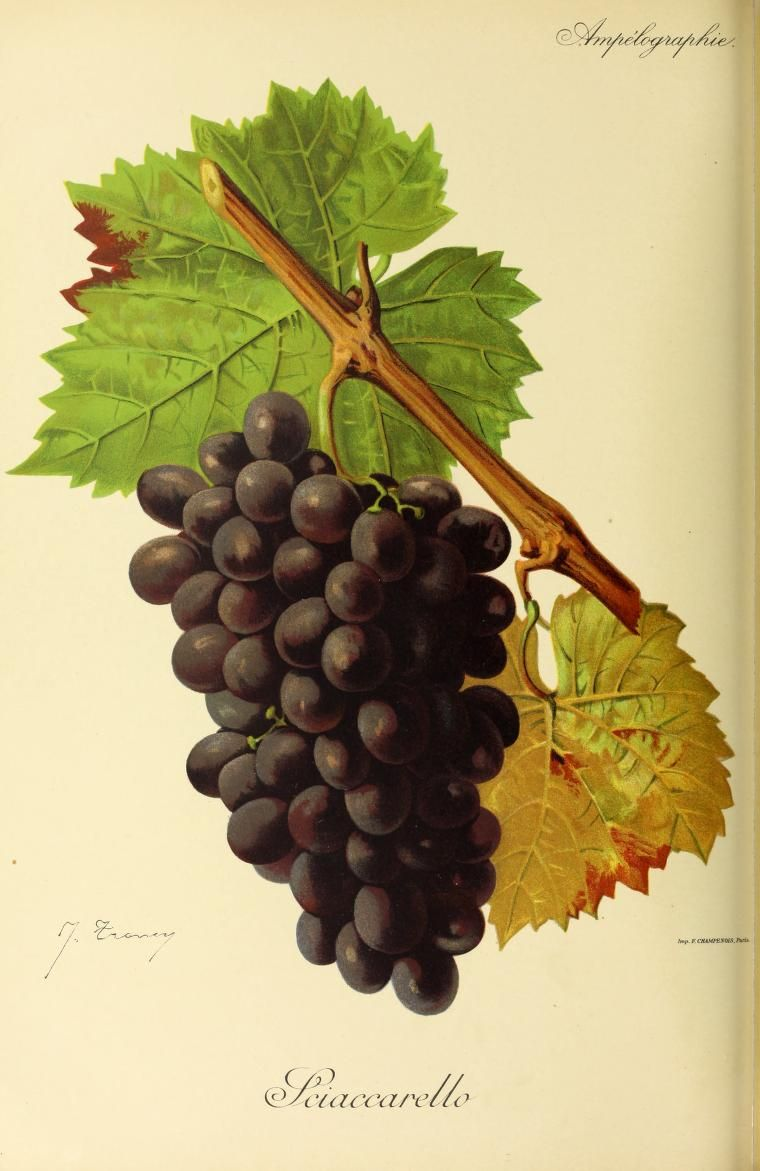
- Sciacarello in Viala & Vermorel
- Color of berry skin: Noir
- Species: Vitis vinifera
- Origin: Italy
- VIVC number: 10837

Sciacarello (or Sciaccarello, Sciaccarellu) is a red Italian wine grape variety that is grown primarily in Corsica. It is most noted for the wines that come from Ajaccio which tend to be highly perfumed. It is also associated with wines from Calvi, and in the Sartène region around Propriano. The grape is normally blended and rarely made into a varietal wine. Sciacarello is believed to be a parent vine of the Ligurian-Tuscan wine grape, pollera nera. Di Vecchi Staraz, Bandinelli, Boselli, This, Boursiquot, Laucou, Lacombe, and Varès (2007) showed that Sciaccarello (or Sciaccarellu as it is known in Corsica) and another Corsican variety Malvasia Montanaccio as well as Tuscan varieties Biancone, Caloria, Colombana Nera, and Pollera Nera have genetic ties to Mammolo.
