= Torra di Capu Neru =

Genoese coastal defence tower in Corsica

Tower of Capu Neru
- Torra di Capu Neru (Corsican)
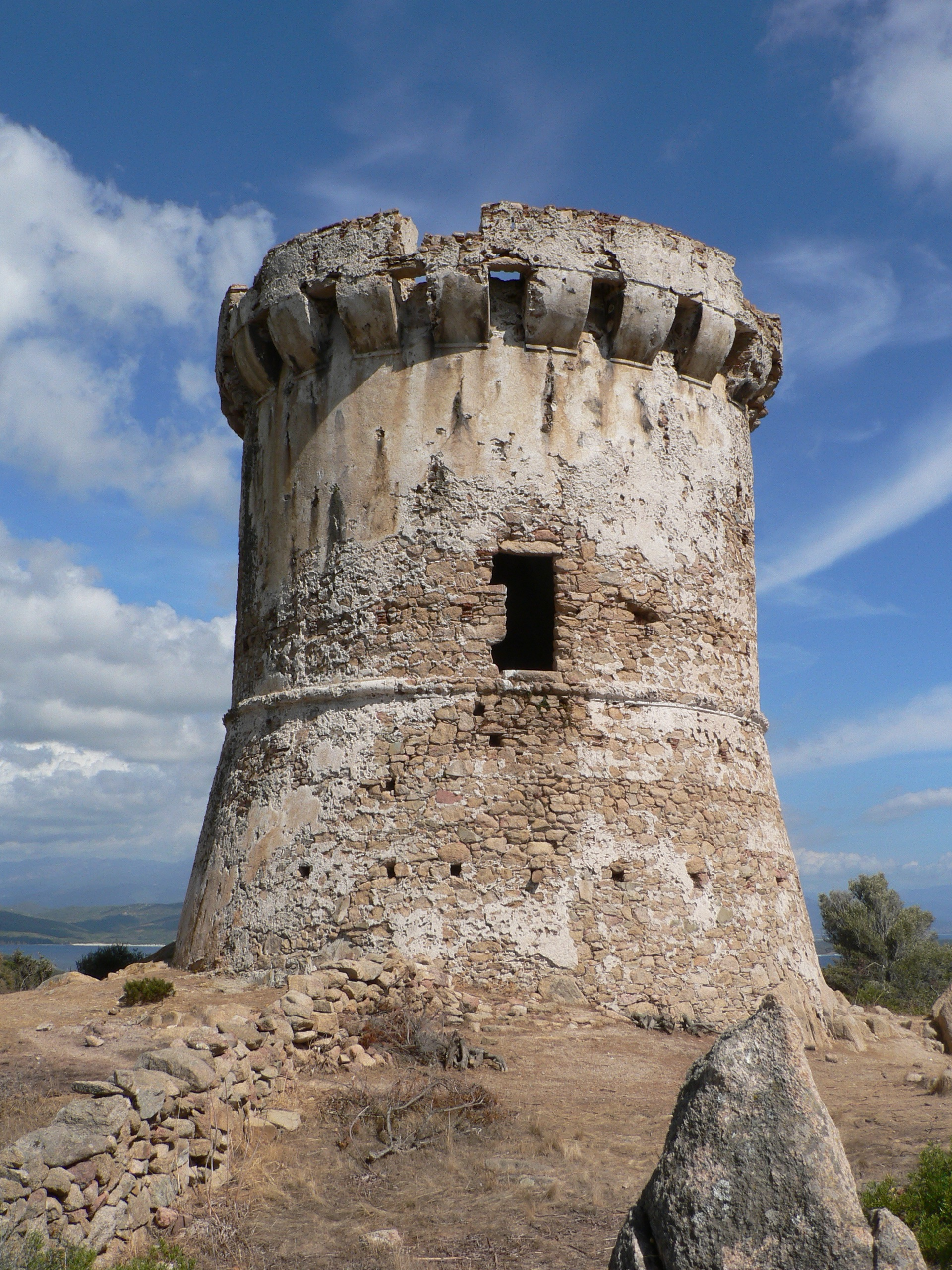

- Location within Corsica
- 41°43′31″N 8°42′34″E

Monument historique
- Designated: 22 April 1994
- Reference no.: PA00132602

The Tower of Capu Neru (Corsican: Torra di Capu Neru) is a Genoese tower located in the commune of Coti-Chiavari (Corse-du-Sud) on the west coast of the Corsica. The tower sits at an elevation of 119 metres (390 ft) on the Capu Neru headland.

Construction of the tower began 1597. It was one of a series of coastal defences built by the Republic of Genoa between 1530 and 1620 to stem the attacks by Barbary pirates. In 1994 the tower was listed as one of the official historical monuments of France.

== See also ==
- List of Genoese towers in Corsica
