= Tavera =

Commune in Corsica, France

- Commune
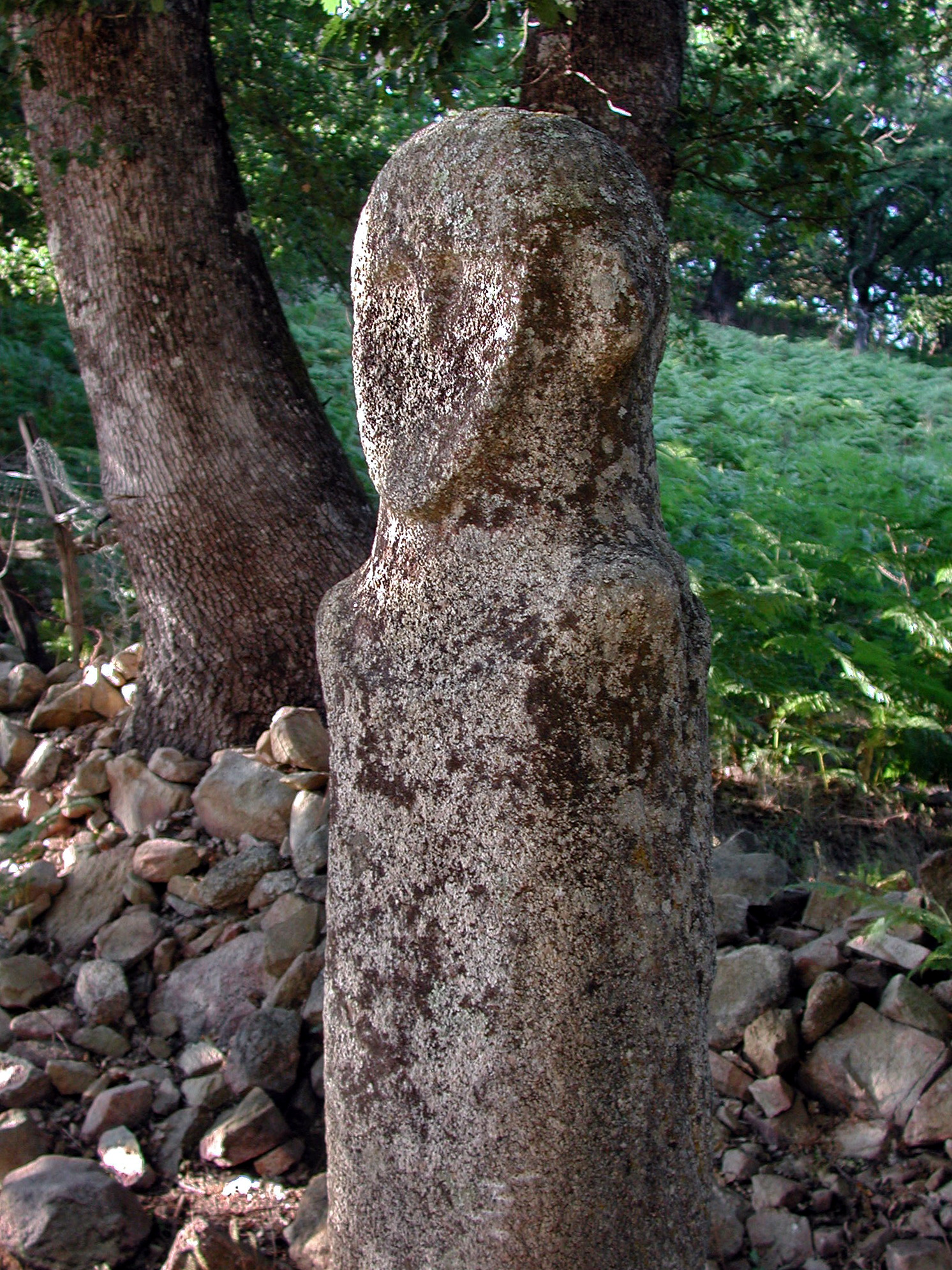
- A statue-menhir in Tavera
- Location of Tavera
- Location within France Location within Corsica
- Coordinates: 42°04′09″N 9°00′58″E
- Country: France
- Region: Corsica
- Department: Corse-du-Sud
- Arrondissement: Ajaccio
- Canton: Gravona-Prunelli

Government
  - Mayor (2020–2026): François Chiarasini
- Area^{1}: 32.43 km^{2} (12.52 sq mi)
- Elevation: 465 m (1,526 ft)
- Highest elevation: 1,920 m (6,300 ft)
- Lowest elevation: 312 m (1,024 ft)
- Population (2023): 453
  - Density: 14.0/km^{2} (36.2/sq mi)
- Time zone: UTC+01:00 (CET)
  - Summer (DST): UTC+02:00 (CEST)
- INSEE/Postal code: 2A324 /20163
- ^{1} French Land Register data, which excludes lakes, ponds, glaciers > 1 km^{2} (0.386 sq mi or 247 acres) and river estuaries.

Tavera is a commune in the Corse-du-Sud department of France on the island of Corsica.

== Population ==
Historical population
Year	Pop.	±% p.a.
1968	278	—
1975	267	−0.58%
1982	250	−0.94%
1990	249	−0.05%
1999	336	+3.39%
2007	376	+1.42%
2012	385	+0.47%
2017	401	+0.82%
2023	453	+2.05%
Source: INSEE

== Transport ==
The town is served by a station on the Corsican Railways.

== See also ==
- Communes of the Corse-du-Sud department
