= Torra di a Castagna =

Genoese coastal defence tower in Corsica

Tower of Castagna
- Torra di a Castagna (Corsican)
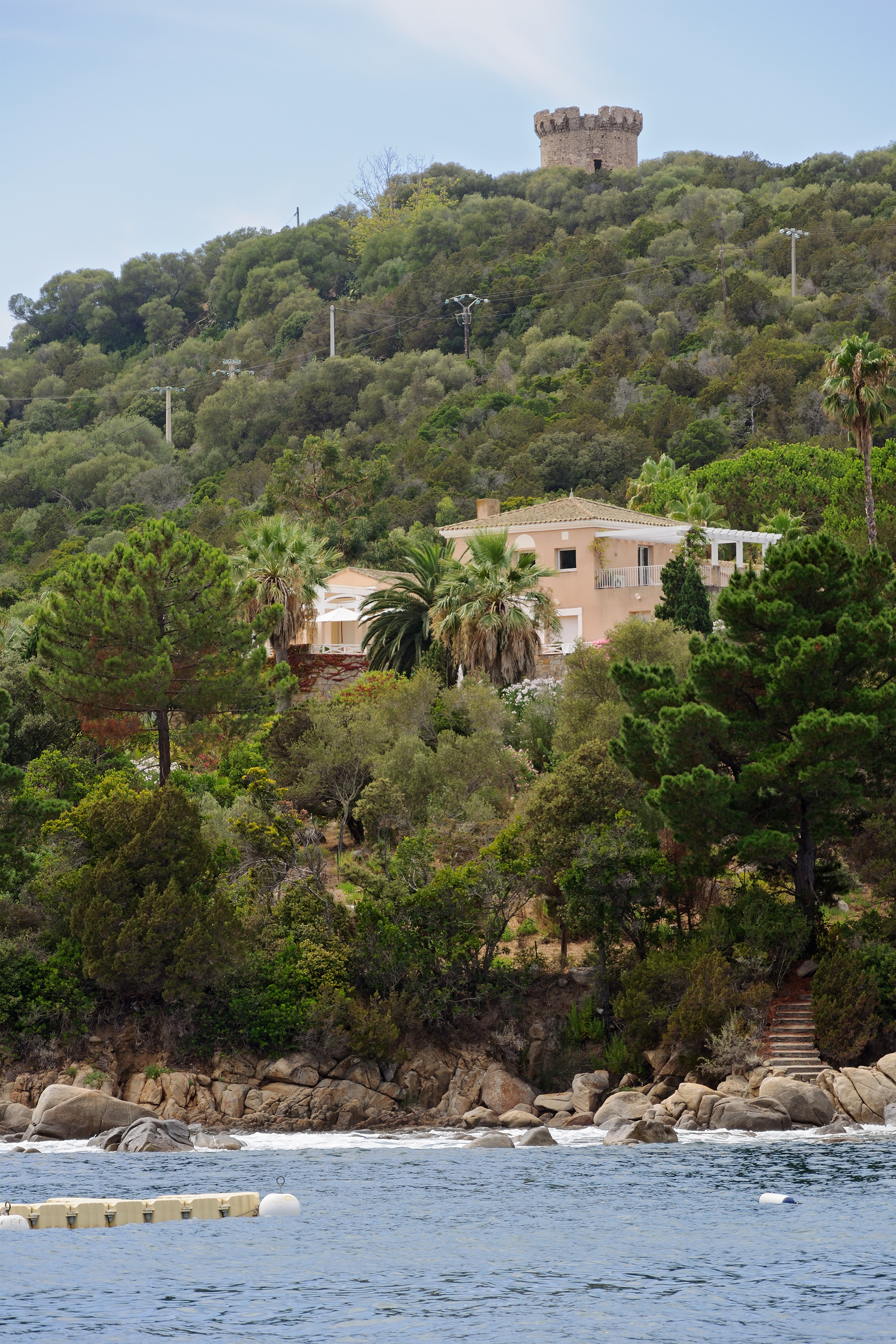

- Location within Corsica
- 41°47′56″N 8°42′52″E

History
- Built: Around 1600

The Tower of Castagna (Corsican: Torra di a Castagna) is a ruined Genoese tower located in the commune of Coti-Chiavari on the west coast of Corsica.

The tower was built in around 1600. It was one of a series of coastal defences constructed by the Republic of Genoa between 1530 and 1620 to stem the attacks by Barbary pirates.

== See also ==
- List of Genoese towers in Corsica
