= Coti-Chiavari =

Commune in Corsica, France

- Commune
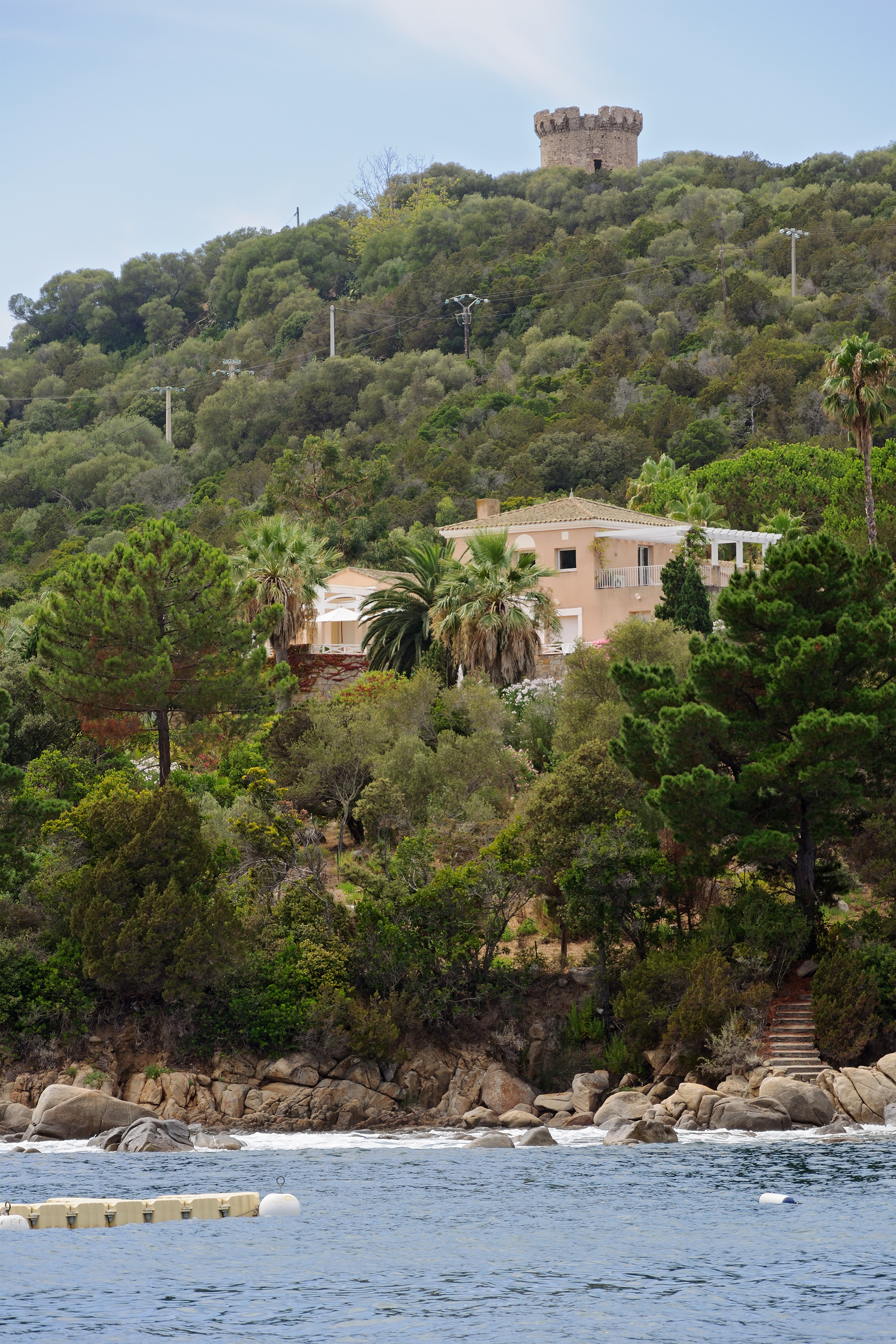
- The shore at Coti-Chiavari between Castagna cape and Portiglio cove
- Location of Coti-Chiavari
- Location within France Location within Corsica
- Coordinates: 41°46′24″N 8°46′19″E
- Country: France
- Region: Corsica
- Department: Corse-du-Sud
- Arrondissement: Ajaccio
- Canton: Taravo-Ornano

Government
  - Mayor (2023–2026): Félix Peretti
- Area^{1}: 63.33 km^{2} (24.45 sq mi)
- Elevation: 614 m (2,014 ft)
- Highest elevation: 648 m (2,126 ft)
- Lowest elevation: 0 m (0 ft)
- Population (2023): 737
  - Density: 11.6/km^{2} (30.1/sq mi)
- Time zone: UTC+01:00 (CET)
  - Summer (DST): UTC+02:00 (CEST)
- INSEE/Postal code: 2A098 /20138
- ^{1} French Land Register data, which excludes lakes, ponds, glaciers > 1 km^{2} (0.386 sq mi or 247 acres) and river estuaries.

Coti-Chiavari (French pronunciation: [kɔti kjavaʁi]; Corsican: Coti è Chjavari) is a commune of the Corse-du-Sud department of France on the island of Corsica.

== Population ==
Historical population
Year	Pop.	±% p.a.
1968	270	—
1975	285	+0.78%
1982	340	+2.55%
1990	399	+2.02%
1999	490	+2.31%
2007	705	+4.65%
2012	737	+0.89%
2017	728	−0.25%
2023	737	+0.20%
Source: INSEE

== Sights ==
- Torra di Capu Neru
- Torra di Capu di Muru
- Torra di a Castagna

== See also ==
- Communes of the Corse-du-Sud department
