= Tavaco =

Commune in Corsica, France

Tavaco Tavacu
- Commune
- Location of Tavaco
- Location within France Location within Corsica
- Coordinates: 42°02′05″N 8°53′54″E
- Country: France
- Region: Corsica
- Department: Corse-du-Sud
- Arrondissement: Ajaccio
- Canton: Gravona-Prunelli
- Intercommunality: CA Pays Ajaccien

Government
  - Mayor (2020–2026): Jean-Marie Pasqualaggi
- Area^{1}: 10.9 km^{2} (4.2 sq mi)
- Highest elevation: 1,240 m (4,070 ft)
- Lowest elevation: 140 m (460 ft)
- Population (2023): 414
  - Density: 38.0/km^{2} (98.4/sq mi)
- Time zone: UTC+01:00 (CET)
  - Summer (DST): UTC+02:00 (CEST)
- INSEE/Postal code: 2A323 /20167
- ^{1} French Land Register data, which excludes lakes, ponds, glaciers > 1 km^{2} (0.386 sq mi or 247 acres) and river estuaries.

Tavaco (French pronunciation: [tavako]; Corsican: Tàvacu) is a commune in the Corse-du-Sud department of France on the island of Corsica.

== Geography ==
Tavaco is a village located on the slopes of the right bank of the river Gravona.

== Population ==
Historical population
Year	Pop.	±% p.a.
1968	43	—
1975	61	+5.12%
1982	104	+7.92%
1990	171	+6.41%
1999	226	+3.15%
2007	263	+1.91%
2012	308	+3.21%
2017	369	+3.68%
2023	414	+1.94%
Source: INSEE

== See also ==
- Communes of the Corse-du-Sud department
