= Vero, Corse-du-Sud =

Commune in Corsica, France

Vero Veru (Corsican)
- Commune
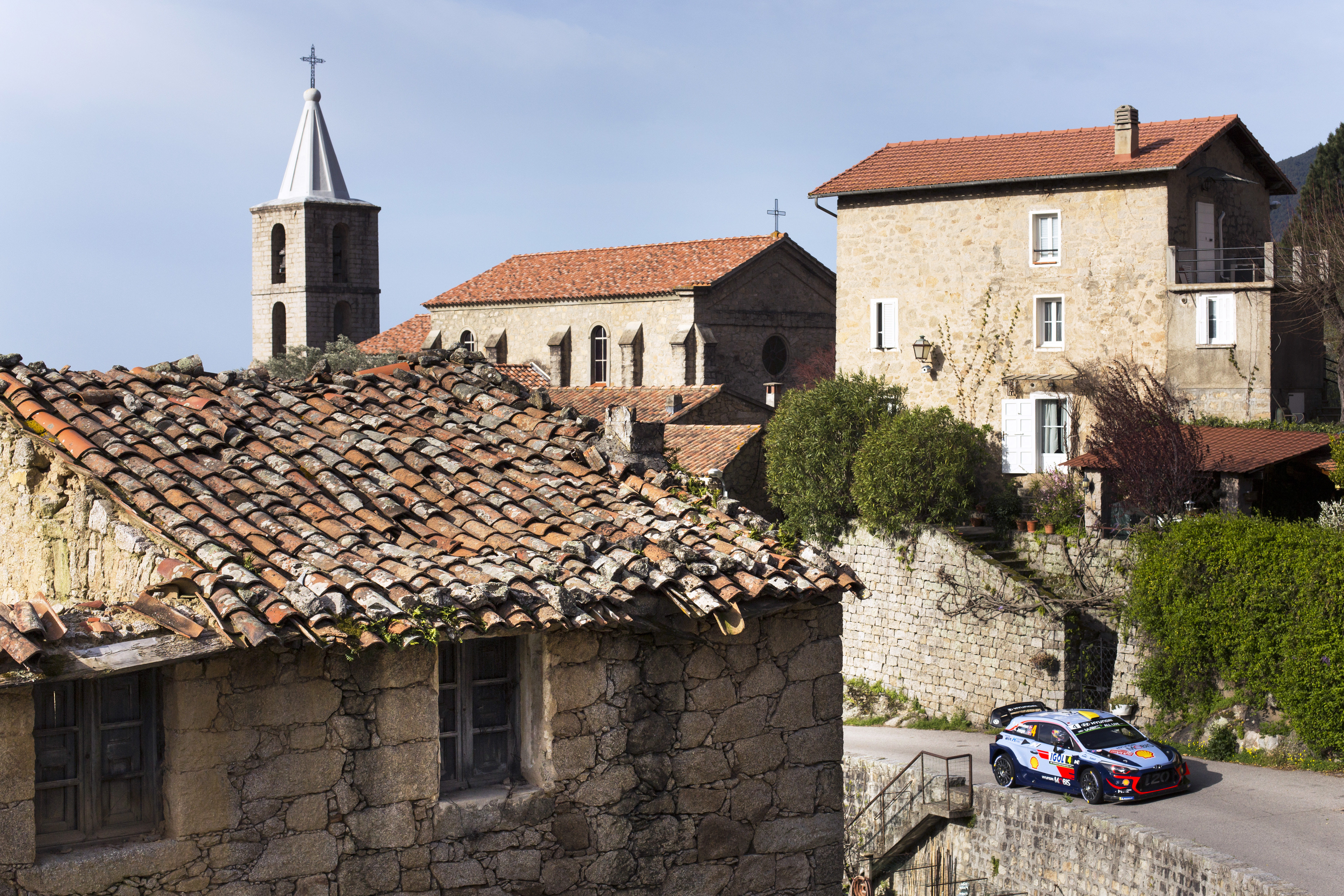
- Andreas Mikkelsen driving through Vero during the 2018 Tour de Corse
- Location of Vero
- Location within France Location within Corsica
- Coordinates: 42°03′49″N 8°55′59″E
- Country: France
- Region: Corsica
- Department: Corse-du-Sud
- Arrondissement: Ajaccio
- Canton: Gravona-Prunelli

Government
  - Mayor (2020–2026): Marie-France Orsoni
- Area^{1}: 23.39 km^{2} (9.03 sq mi)
- Elevation: 450 m (1,480 ft)
- Highest elevation: 1,244 m (4,081 ft)
- Lowest elevation: 180 m (590 ft)
- Population (2023): 640
  - Density: 27/km^{2} (71/sq mi)
- Time zone: UTC+01:00 (CET)
  - Summer (DST): UTC+02:00 (CEST)
- INSEE/Postal code: 2A345 /20172
- ^{1} French Land Register data, which excludes lakes, ponds, glaciers > 1 km^{2} (0.386 sq mi or 247 acres) and river estuaries.

Vero (Corsican: Veru) is a commune in the Corse-du-Sud department of France on the island of Corsica.

== Population ==
Historical population
Year	Pop.	±% p.a.
1968	261	—
1975	147	−7.87%
1982	241	+7.32%
1990	296	+2.60%
1999	351	+1.91%
2007	451	+3.18%
2012	506	+2.33%
2017	579	+2.73%
2023	640	+1.68%
Source: INSEE

== See also ==
- Communes of the Corse-du-Sud department
