= Appietto =

Commune in Corsica, France

- Commune
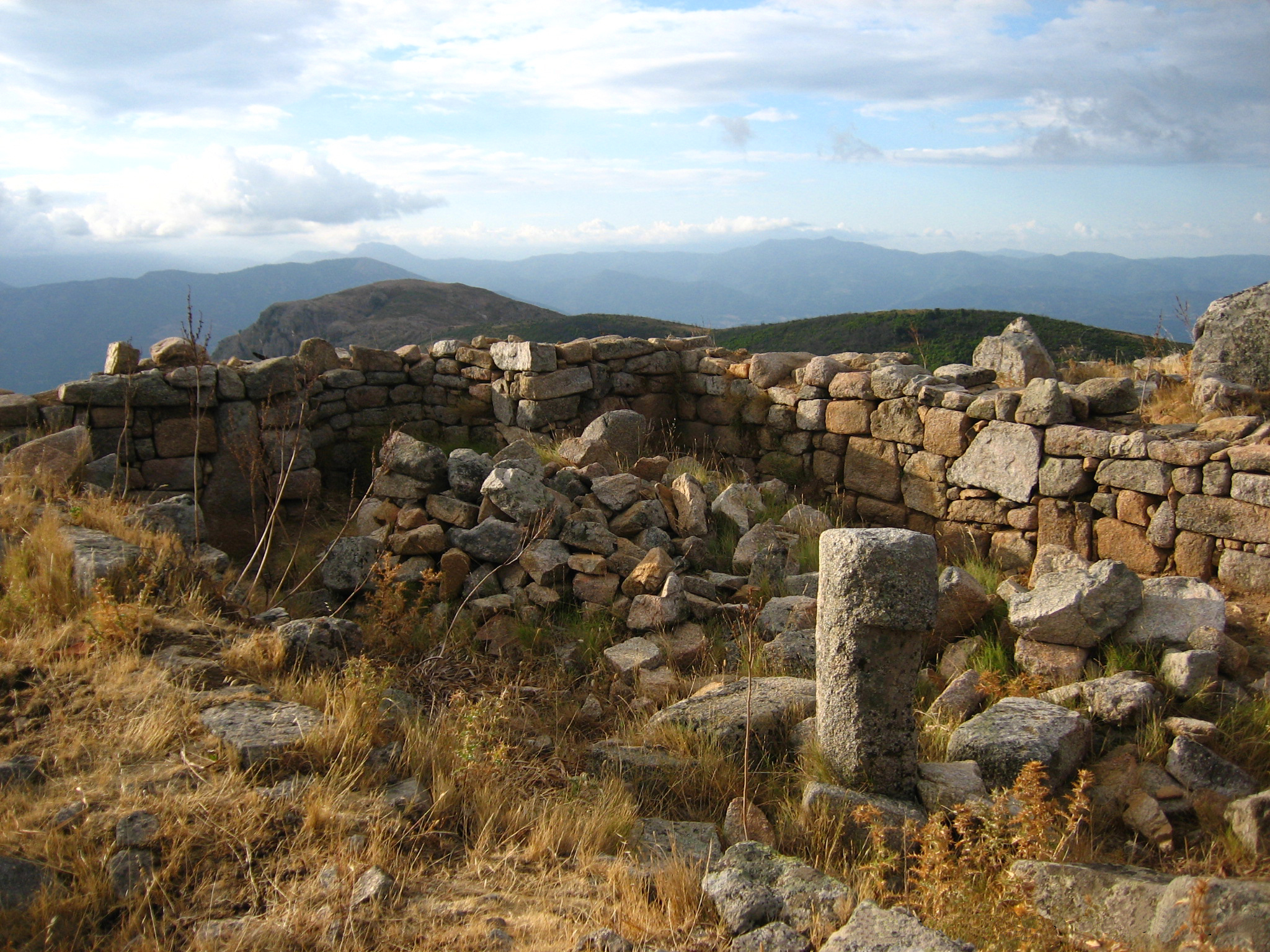
- Ruins of the chapel of St. Cyr
- Location of Appietto
- Location within France Location within Corsica
- Coordinates: 42°00′53″N 8°46′06″E
- Country: France
- Region: Corsica
- Department: Corse-du-Sud
- Arrondissement: Ajaccio
- Canton: Gravona-Prunelli
- Intercommunality: CA Pays Ajaccien

Government
  - Mayor (2020–2026): François Faggianelli
- Area^{1}: 34.41 km^{2} (13.29 sq mi)
- Elevation: 431 m (1,414 ft)
- Highest elevation: 876 m (2,874 ft)
- Lowest elevation: 0 m (0 ft)
- Population (2023): 1,749
  - Density: 50.83/km^{2} (131.6/sq mi)
- Time zone: UTC+01:00 (CET)
  - Summer (DST): UTC+02:00 (CEST)
- INSEE/Postal code: 2A017 /20167
- ^{1} French Land Register data, which excludes lakes, ponds, glaciers > 1 km^{2} (0.386 sq mi or 247 acres) and river estuaries.

Appietto (French pronunciation: [apjɛto]; Corsican: Appiettu) is a commune in the Corse-du-Sud department of France on the island of Corsica.

== Geography ==
Appietto is located 17 km from Ajaccio, and stretches from the Gozzi mount to the coastline of the Gulf of Lava. This historic village culminates at 480 meters, while the rest of the town consists of several ancient villages (Volpaja, Lava Listincone, Picchio, Piscia Rossa) and recent subdivisions (Monté Nebbio, Chiosu Vecchiu, Vanghone, Filletta).

The Ruisseau de Lava flows through the commune from east to west. It enters the sea in the Golfe de Lava, which has been designated a Natura 2000 site.

== Sights ==
- Chapel St Cyr: This chapel is located on the heights of Appietto. It is oriented eastwards. It remains in ruins today.
- Ciuttulaghja: An archaeological site in Corsica. It is located in the commune.
- Torra di Pelusella: A Genoese tower.

== Population ==
Historical population
Year	Pop.	±% p.a.
1968	319	—
1975	324	+0.22%
1982	623	+9.79%
1990	857	+4.07%
1999	1,149	+3.31%
2007	1,322	+1.77%
2012	1,619	+4.14%
2017	1,825	+2.42%
2023	1,749	−0.71%
Source: INSEE

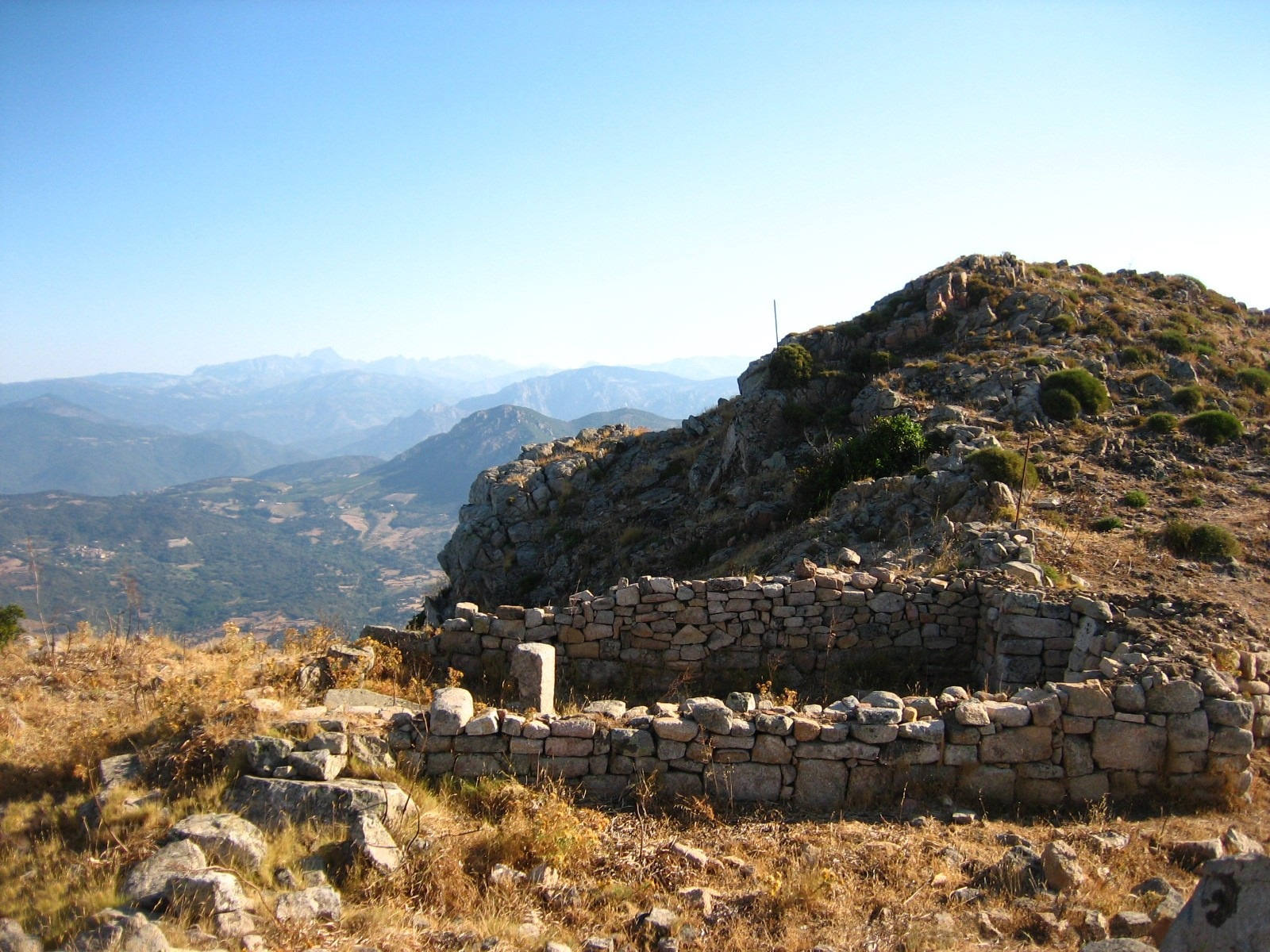
Ancient chapel of St. Cyr

== See also ==
- Tour de Pelusella
- Communes of the Corse-du-Sud department
