= Antoine Baudoin Poggiale =

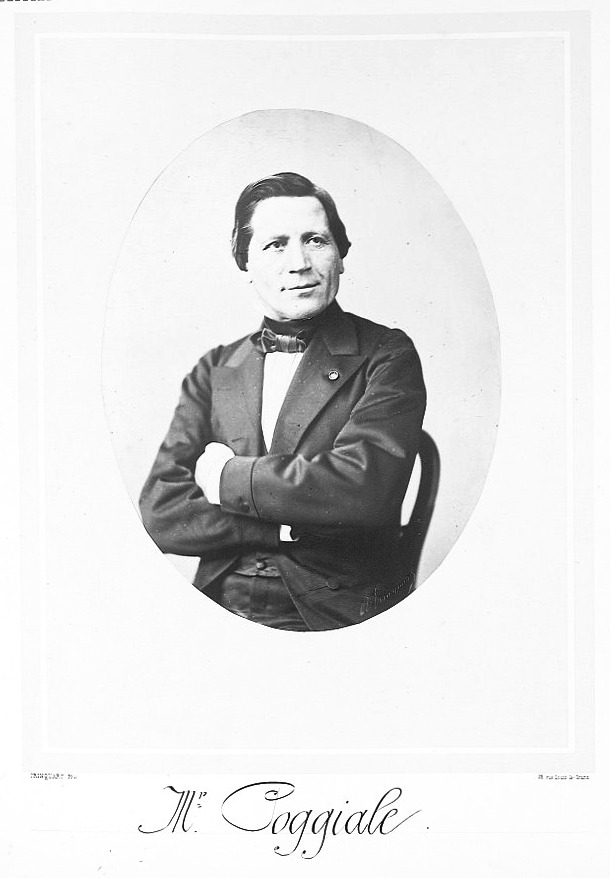
Carte-de-visite, c. 1862

Antoine-Baudoin Poggiale (9 February 1808 – 26 August 1879) was a French pharmacist, medical doctor, analytical chemist and a pioneer biochemist. He published Traite d’analyse chimique par la method des volumes (1858), an early text on volumetric analytical techniques. He examined sugar in human body, the composition of blood, milk, food stuffs, and examined the potential of acetaldehyde as an anaesthetic.

Poggiale was born in Valle near Ajaccio to a physician. Educated locally and at Marseilles, he became a student of pharmacy at Strasbourg in 1828 and joined the army as an assistant pharmacist. After field service, he moved to work at the army teaching hospital in Lille from 1831 and then worked in Paris working at the Gros Caillou and then to the Val-de-Grâce hospitals. While in Paris he enrolled at the Faculté de Médicine and received a doctor of medicine degree in 1833 with studies on intermittent fevers. He then started a course at Val-de-Grâce on analytical chemistry leading to his being made the first chair of chemistry and toxicology at the school of military medicine and pharmacy. He served as chief pharmacist at Metz during the Franco-Prussian War in 1870 and retired in 1872.

Poggiale's contributions to chemistry were initially on analytical applications. He examined stones formed by the salivary glands and then took an interest in the composition of mineral waters from Viterbo and Orezza. He also conducted chemical examinations of the water in the Seine. He also examined the composition of human food. Poggiale was able to demonstrate that an extract from sarsaparilla called pariglina and another substance smilacin reported by Giacomo Folchi were essentially the same. In 1848 he examined the effects of inhaling aldehyde vapors. He conducted tests on dogs showing that anaesthesia could be induced and reversed.

He was made Commander of the Legion of Honor in 1865.
