= Ocana, Corse-du-Sud =

Commune in Corsica, France

Ocana
- Commune
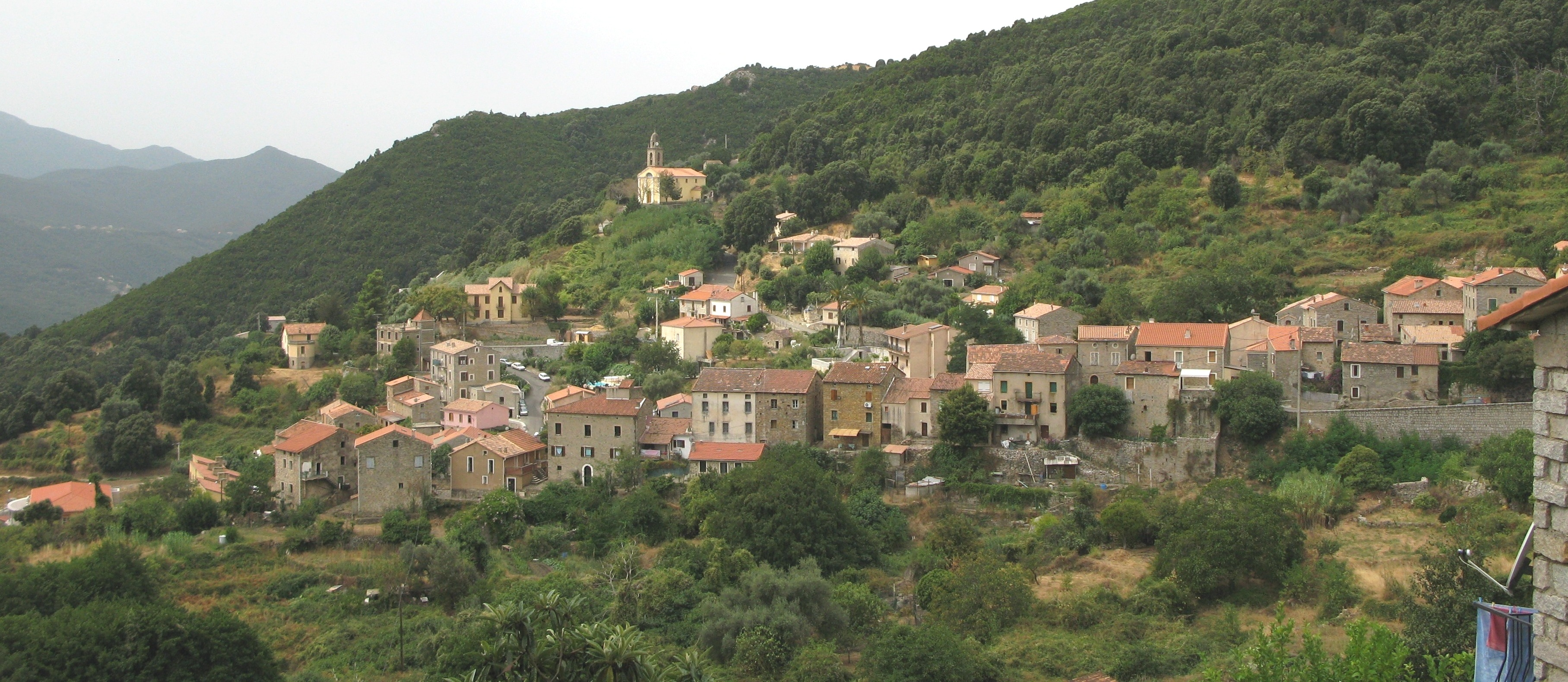
- A general view of Ocana in 2008
- Location of Ocana
- Location within France Location within Corsica
- Coordinates: 41°57′37″N 8°56′06″E
- Country: France
- Region: Corsica
- Department: Corse-du-Sud
- Arrondissement: Ajaccio
- Canton: Gravona-Prunelli

Government
  - Mayor (2020–2026): Jean Jacques Muraccioli
- Area^{1}: 26.06 km^{2} (10.06 sq mi)
- Elevation: 350 m (1,150 ft)
- Highest elevation: 1,311 m (4,301 ft)
- Lowest elevation: 36 m (118 ft)
- Population (2023): 657
  - Density: 25.2/km^{2} (65.3/sq mi)
- Time zone: UTC+01:00 (CET)
  - Summer (DST): UTC+02:00 (CEST)
- INSEE/Postal code: 2A181 /20117
- ^{1} French Land Register data, which excludes lakes, ponds, glaciers > 1 km^{2} (0.386 sq mi or 247 acres) and river estuaries.

Ocana (French pronunciation: [ɔkana]) is a commune in the Corse-du-Sud department of France on the island of Corsica.

== Population ==
Historical population
Year	Pop.	±% p.a.
1968	350	—
1975	308	−1.81%
1982	282	−1.25%
1990	296	+0.61%
1999	394	+3.23%
2007	509	+3.25%
2012	548	+1.49%
2017	605	+2.00%
2023	657	+1.38%
Source: INSEE

== See also ==
- Communes of the Corse-du-Sud department
