= Peri, Corse-du-Sud =

Commune in Corsica, France

Peri
- Commune
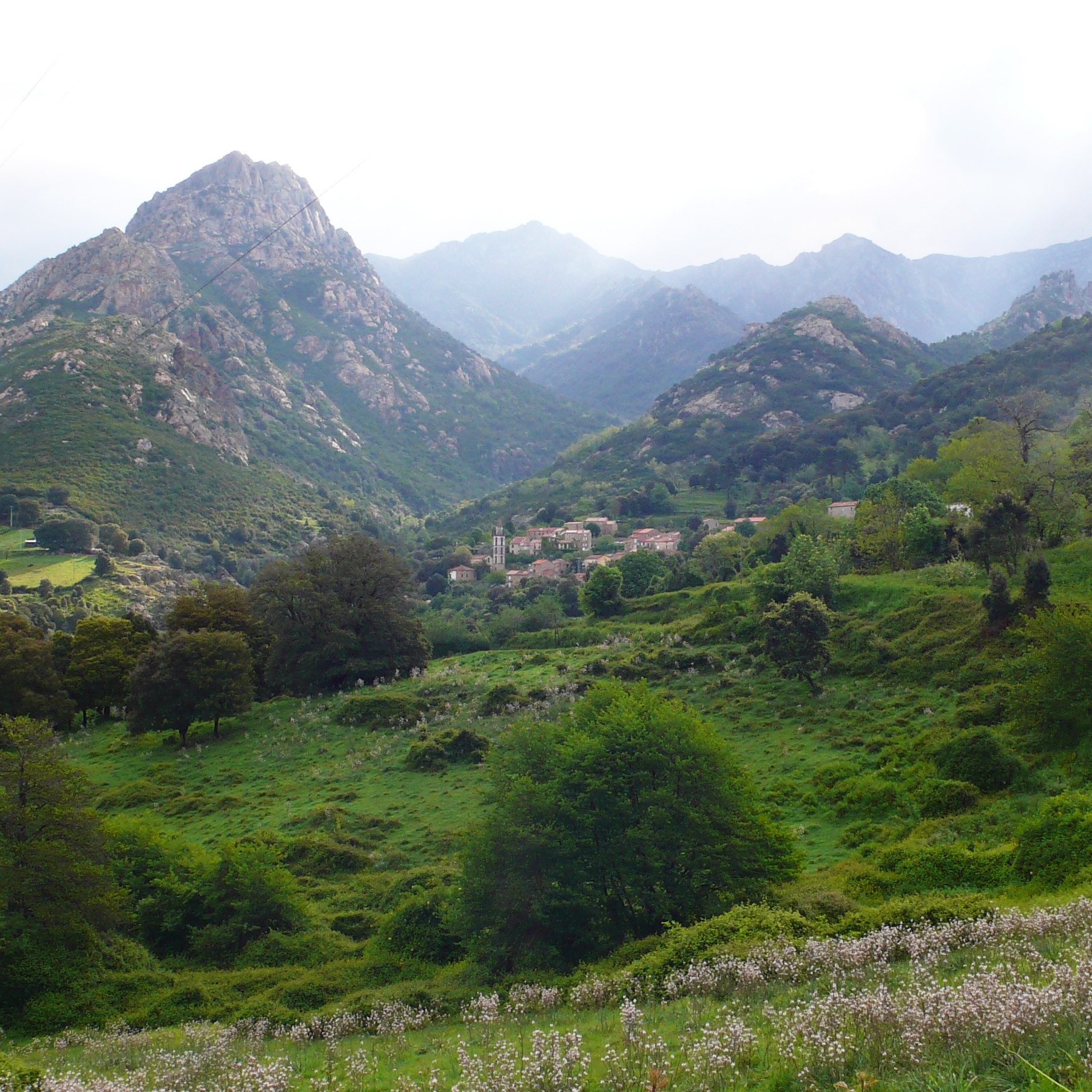
- A view of the village of Peri, in spring, from the bottom of the valley of Santa Libarata
- Location of Peri
- Location within France Location within Corsica
- Coordinates: 42°00′18″N 8°55′17″E
- Country: France
- Region: Corsica
- Department: Corse-du-Sud
- Arrondissement: Ajaccio
- Canton: Gravona-Prunelli
- Intercommunality: CA Pays Ajaccien

Government
  - Mayor (2025–2026): Gustave Tallarico
- Area^{1}: 23.65 km^{2} (9.13 sq mi)
- Elevation: 460 m (1,510 ft)
- Highest elevation: 1,507 m (4,944 ft)
- Lowest elevation: 38 m (125 ft)
- Population (2023): 2,044
  - Density: 86.43/km^{2} (223.8/sq mi)
- Time zone: UTC+01:00 (CET)
  - Summer (DST): UTC+02:00 (CEST)
- INSEE/Postal code: 2A209 /20167
- ^{1} French Land Register data, which excludes lakes, ponds, glaciers > 1 km^{2} (0.386 sq mi or 247 acres) and river estuaries.

Peri is a commune in the Corse-du-Sud department of France on the island of Corsica.

== Population ==
Historical population

Year	Pop.	±% p.a.
1800	450	—
1851	605	+0.58%
1901	722	+0.35%
1962	487	−0.64%
1968	493	+0.20%
1975	507	+0.40%
1982	626	+3.06%

Year	Pop.	±% p.a.
1990	924	+4.99%
1999	1,140	+2.36%
2007	1,516	+3.63%
2012	1,750	+2.91%
2017	1,999	+2.70%
2023	2,044	+0.37%

Source: EHESS and INSEE (1968-2023)

== See also ==
- Communes of the Corse-du-Sud department
