= Cuttoli-Corticchiato =

Commune in Corsica, France

- Commune
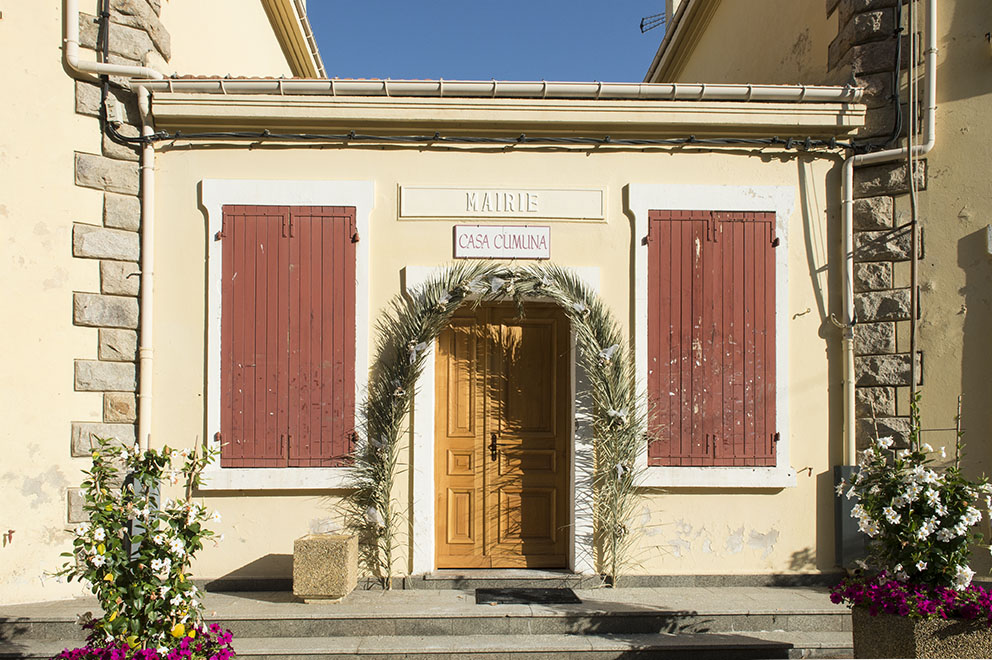
- Town Hall
- Location of Cuttoli-Corticchiato
- Location within France Location within Corsica
- Coordinates: 41°59′23″N 8°54′25″E
- Country: France
- Region: Corsica
- Department: Corse-du-Sud
- Arrondissement: Ajaccio
- Canton: Gravona-Prunelli
- Intercommunality: CA Pays Ajaccien

Government
  - Mayor (2020–2026): Jean Biancucci
- Area^{1}: 30.37 km^{2} (11.73 sq mi)
- Elevation: 700 m (2,300 ft)
- Highest elevation: 1,311 m (4,301 ft)
- Lowest elevation: 14 m (46 ft)
- Population (2023): 2,060
  - Density: 67.8/km^{2} (176/sq mi)
- Time zone: UTC+01:00 (CET)
  - Summer (DST): UTC+02:00 (CEST)
- INSEE/Postal code: 2A103 /20167
- ^{1} French Land Register data, which excludes lakes, ponds, glaciers > 1 km^{2} (0.386 sq mi or 247 acres) and river estuaries.

Cuttoli-Corticchiato (French pronunciation: [kutɔli kɔʁtikjato]; Corsican: Cuttuli è Curtichjatu) is a commune in the Corse-du-Sud department of France on the island of Corsica.

== Population ==
Historical population
Year	Pop.	±% p.a.
1968	544	—
1975	465	−2.22%
1982	643	+4.74%
1990	1,085	+6.76%
1999	1,473	+3.46%
2007	1,819	+2.67%
2012	1,947	+1.37%
2017	2,009	+0.63%
2023	2,060	+0.42%
Source: INSEE

== See also ==
- Communes of the Corse-du-Sud department
