= Sarrola-Carcopino =

Commune in Corsica, France

- Commune
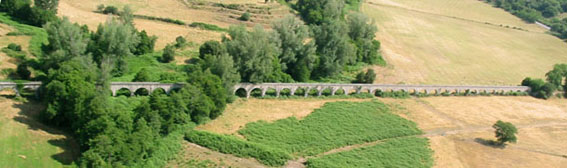
- The aqueduct of Mezzana, in Sarrola-Carcopino
- Location of Sarrola-Carcopino
- Location within France Location within Corsica
- Coordinates: 42°01′43″N 8°50′36″E
- Country: France
- Region: Corsica
- Department: Corse-du-Sud
- Arrondissement: Ajaccio
- Canton: Gravona-Prunelli
- Intercommunality: CA Pays Ajaccien

Government
  - Mayor (2020–2026): Alexandre Sarrola
- Area^{1}: 27.01 km^{2} (10.43 sq mi)
- Elevation: 450 m (1,480 ft)
- Highest elevation: 1,133 m (3,717 ft)
- Lowest elevation: 15 m (49 ft)
- Population (2023): 3,278
  - Density: 121.4/km^{2} (314.3/sq mi)
- Time zone: UTC+01:00 (CET)
  - Summer (DST): UTC+02:00 (CEST)
- INSEE/Postal code: 2A271 /20167
- ^{1} French Land Register data, which excludes lakes, ponds, glaciers > 1 km^{2} (0.386 sq mi or 247 acres) and river estuaries.

Sarrola-Carcopino (French pronunciation: [saʁɔla kaʁkɔpino]; Corsican: Sarrula è Carcupinu) is a commune in the Corse-du-Sud department of France on the island of Corsica.

== Population ==
Historical population
Year	Pop.	±% p.a.
1968	534	—
1975	508	−0.71%
1982	812	+6.93%
1990	1,424	+7.27%
1999	1,801	+2.64%
2007	1,861	+0.41%
2012	2,219	+3.58%
2017	3,267	+8.04%
2023	3,278	+0.06%
Source: INSEE

== See also ==
- Communes of the Corse-du-Sud department
- Tour de Corse.
