= Valle-di-Mezzana =

Commune in Corsica, France

- Commune
- Location of Valle-di-Mezzana
- Location within France Location within Corsica
- Coordinates: 42°01′35″N 8°49′32″E
- Country: France
- Region: Corsica
- Department: Corse-du-Sud
- Arrondissement: Ajaccio
- Canton: Gravona-Prunelli
- Intercommunality: CA Pays Ajaccien

Government
  - Mayor (2021–2026): Horace Franchi
- Area^{1}: 6.99 km^{2} (2.70 sq mi)
- Elevation: 400 m (1,300 ft)
- Highest elevation: 827 m (2,713 ft)
- Lowest elevation: 174 m (571 ft)
- Population (2023): 537
  - Density: 76.8/km^{2} (199/sq mi)
- Time zone: UTC+01:00 (CET)
  - Summer (DST): UTC+02:00 (CEST)
- INSEE/Postal code: 2A336 /20167
- ^{1} French Land Register data, which excludes lakes, ponds, glaciers > 1 km^{2} (0.386 sq mi or 247 acres) and river estuaries.

Valle-di-Mezzana is a commune in the Corse-du-Sud department of France on the island of Corsica.

== Population ==
Historical population
Year	Pop.	±% p.a.
1968	114	—
1975	87	−3.79%
1982	194	+12.14%
1990	233	+2.32%
1999	217	−0.79%
2007	293	+3.82%
2012	345	+3.32%
2017	444	+5.18%
2023	537	+3.22%
Source: INSEE

== See also ==
- Communes of the Corse-du-Sud department
