= Carbuccia =

Commune in Corsica, France

- Commune
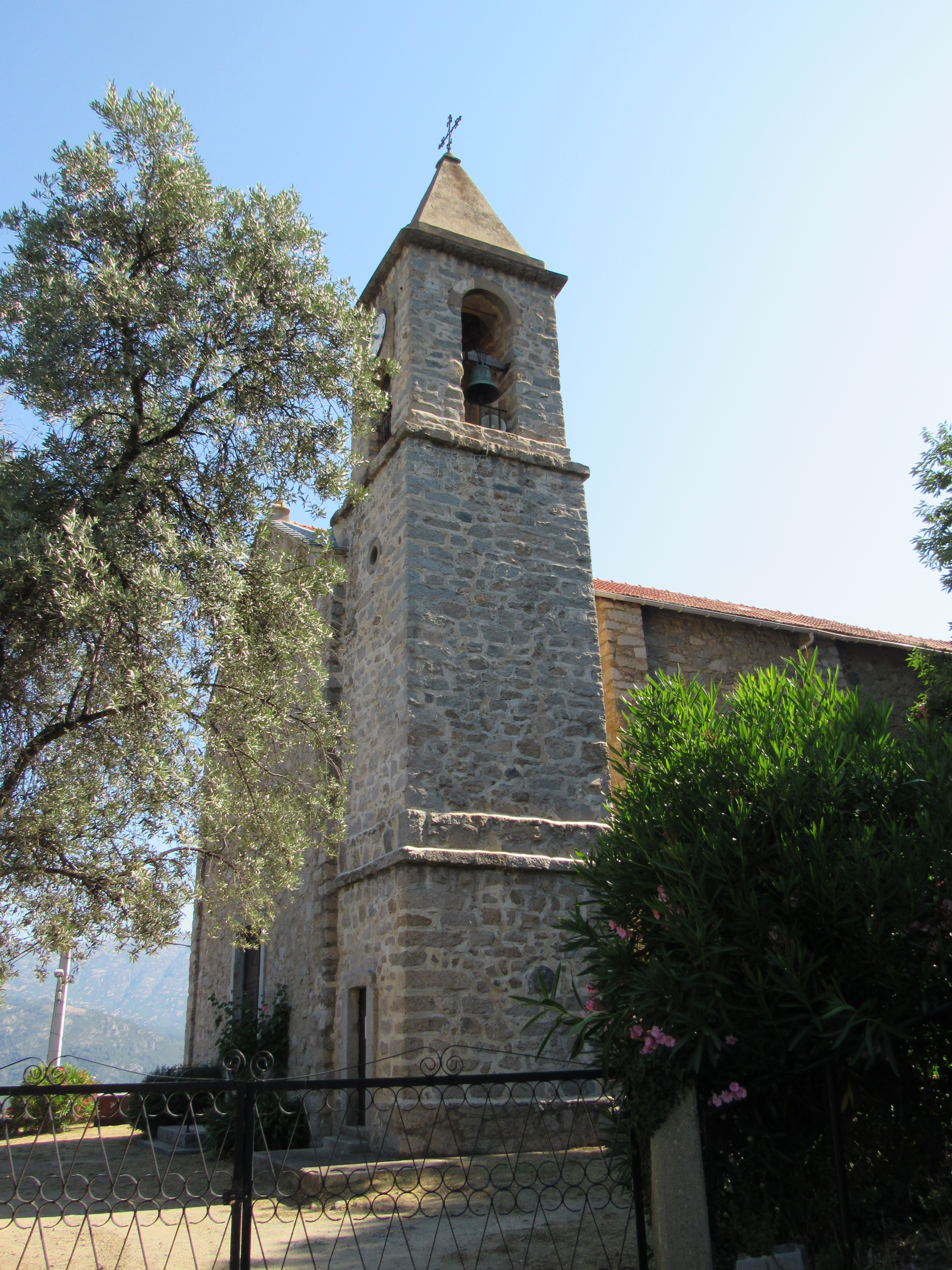
- Parish church
- Location of Carbuccia
- Location within France Location within Corsica
- Coordinates: 42°01′59″N 8°57′00″E
- Country: France
- Region: Corsica
- Department: Corse-du-Sud
- Arrondissement: Ajaccio
- Canton: Gravona-Prunelli

Government
  - Mayor (2020–2026): Pierre-François Bellini
- Area^{1}: 14.35 km^{2} (5.54 sq mi)
- Elevation: 510 m (1,670 ft)
- Highest elevation: 1,280 m (4,200 ft)
- Lowest elevation: 159 m (522 ft)
- Population (2023): 379
  - Density: 26.4/km^{2} (68.4/sq mi)
- Time zone: UTC+01:00 (CET)
  - Summer (DST): UTC+02:00 (CEST)
- INSEE/Postal code: 2A062 /20133
- ^{1} French Land Register data, which excludes lakes, ponds, glaciers > 1 km^{2} (0.386 sq mi or 247 acres) and river estuaries.

Carbuccia is a commune in the Corse-du-Sud department of France on the island of Corsica.

== Population ==
Historical population
Year	Pop.	±% p.a.
1968	223	—
1975	199	−1.61%
1982	180	−1.42%
1990	182	+0.14%
1999	254	+3.77%
2007	316	+2.77%
2012	347	+1.89%
2017	393	+2.52%
2023	379	−0.60%
Source: INSEE

== See also ==
- Communes of the Corse-du-Sud department
- Tour de Corse.
