= Bastelica =

Commune in Corsica, France

- Commune
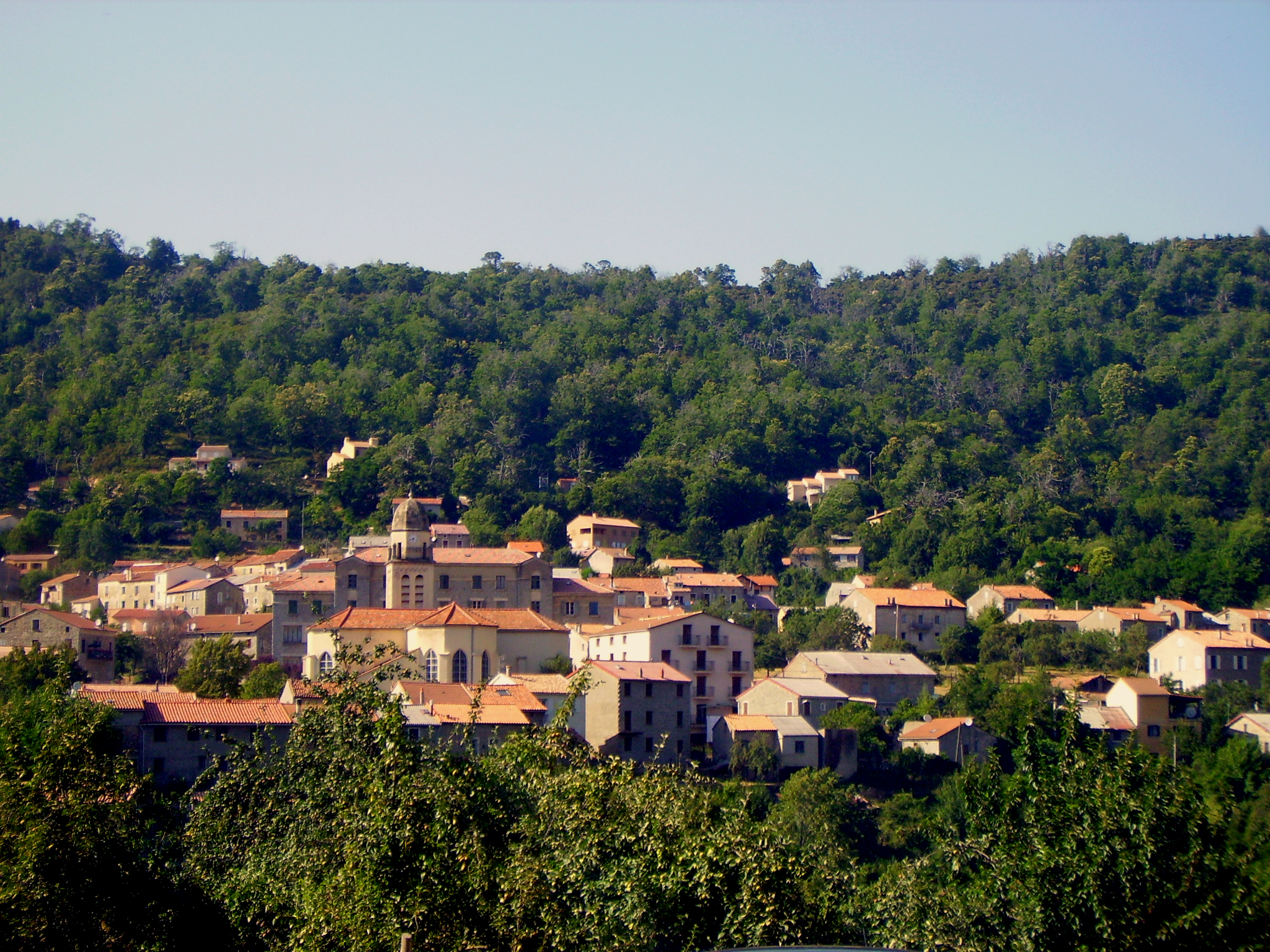
- A general view of Bastelica
- Location of Bastelica
- Location within France Location within Corsica
- Coordinates: 42°00′10″N 9°03′05″E
- Country: France
- Region: Corsica
- Department: Corse-du-Sud
- Arrondissement: Ajaccio
- Canton: Gravona-Prunelli
- Intercommunality: Celavu-Prunelli

Government
  - Mayor (2020–2026): Jean-Baptiste Giffon
- Area^{1}: 127.69 km^{2} (49.30 sq mi)
- Elevation: 808 m (2,651 ft)
- Highest elevation: 2,347 m (7,700 ft)
- Lowest elevation: 306 m (1,004 ft)
- Population (2023): 522
  - Density: 4.09/km^{2} (10.6/sq mi)
- Time zone: UTC+01:00 (CET)
  - Summer (DST): UTC+02:00 (CEST)
- INSEE/Postal code: 2A031 /20119
- ^{1} French Land Register data, which excludes lakes, ponds, glaciers > 1 km^{2} (0.386 sq mi or 247 acres) and river estuaries.

Bastelica is a commune in the Corse-du-Sud department of France on the island of Corsica.

It was the birthplace of Sampiero Corso.

The inhabitants of the commune are known as Bastelicais, Bastelicaises, or Bastilcacci.

== Geography ==
Bastelica is located in the interior of the island in the high valley of the Prunelli south-west of the Monte Renoso Massif of which it shares the summit at 2,352 metres (7,717 ft) of Monte Renoso with Bocognano and Ghisoni. It is also part of the Regional Natural Park of Corsica. It is some 18 km east of Ajaccio (in a straight line). It has many pastures planted with chestnut trees.

Access to the commune is by the D27 from Cauro in the south-west which passes through the length of the commune and the village before continuing north to Bocognano. The D27A goes east from the village to the mountain heights but has no exit. The D3 branches from the D27 south of the village and goes south-west to join the Route nationale N196 near Ajaccio. Apart from the village there are the hamlets of Vignola and Radicale to the south. The commune is rugged and mountainous.

Bastelica has no less than 16 adjacent communes and is one of the six communes in the Community of communes of the Valley of the Prunelli. It was once the chief town of the Canton but is now a part of the Canton of Gravona-Prunelli which has its seat in Afa.

The intersection of the 42nd parallel North and the 9th meridian East of Greenwich is in the commune (see the Degree Confluence Project).

=== Climate ===
Bastelica has a warm-summer mediterranean climate (Köppen climate classification Csb). The average annual temperature in Bastelica is 12.5 °C (54.5 °F). The average annual rainfall is 1,332.8 mm (52.47 in) with December as the wettest month. The temperatures are highest on average in August, at around 21.1 °C (70.0 °F), and lowest in January, at around 5.2 °C (41.4 °F). The highest temperature ever recorded in Bastelica was 40.0 °C (104.0 °F) on 23 July 2009; the coldest temperature ever recorded was −12.0 °C (10.4 °F) on 11 February 1986.

Climate data for Bastelica (1981–2010 averages, extremes 1959–present)
Month	Jan	Feb	Mar	Apr	May	Jun	Jul	Aug	Sep	Oct	Nov	Dec	Year
Record high °C (°F)	23.5 (74.3)	22.0 (71.6)	28.0 (82.4)	32.0 (89.6)	32.0 (89.6)	35.2 (95.4)	40.0 (104.0)	39.5 (103.1)	36.5 (97.7)	32.0 (89.6)	25.0 (77.0)	21.0 (69.8)	40.0 (104.0)
Mean daily maximum °C (°F)	9.7 (49.5)	10.2 (50.4)	12.8 (55.0)	15.1 (59.2)	20.0 (68.0)	24.0 (75.2)	28.0 (82.4)	28.1 (82.6)	24.0 (75.2)	19.6 (67.3)	13.8 (56.8)	10.6 (51.1)	18.0 (64.4)
Daily mean °C (°F)	5.2 (41.4)	5.4 (41.7)	7.6 (45.7)	9.8 (49.6)	14.2 (57.6)	17.9 (64.2)	21.0 (69.8)	21.1 (70.0)	17.6 (63.7)	14.1 (57.4)	9.1 (48.4)	6.3 (43.3)	12.5 (54.5)
Mean daily minimum °C (°F)	0.7 (33.3)	0.6 (33.1)	2.4 (36.3)	4.5 (40.1)	8.4 (47.1)	11.8 (53.2)	14.0 (57.2)	14.2 (57.6)	11.1 (52.0)	8.5 (47.3)	4.4 (39.9)	2.0 (35.6)	6.9 (44.4)
Record low °C (°F)	−11.0 (12.2)	−12.0 (10.4)	−9.0 (15.8)	−3.0 (26.6)	−1.0 (30.2)	2.0 (35.6)	3.8 (38.8)	5.0 (41.0)	2.0 (35.6)	−2.1 (28.2)	−7.1 (19.2)	−9.8 (14.4)	−12.0 (10.4)
Average precipitation mm (inches)	125.2 (4.93)	111.5 (4.39)	109.1 (4.30)	130.5 (5.14)	95.6 (3.76)	53.7 (2.11)	25.2 (0.99)	38.4 (1.51)	97.7 (3.85)	146.1 (5.75)	196.8 (7.75)	203.0 (7.99)	1,332.8 (52.47)
Average precipitation days (≥ 1.0 mm)	10.1	9.9	9.5	11.7	9.1	5.6	2.7	4.1	7.5	10.0	11.7	11.7	103.5
Source: Meteo France

== Administration ==
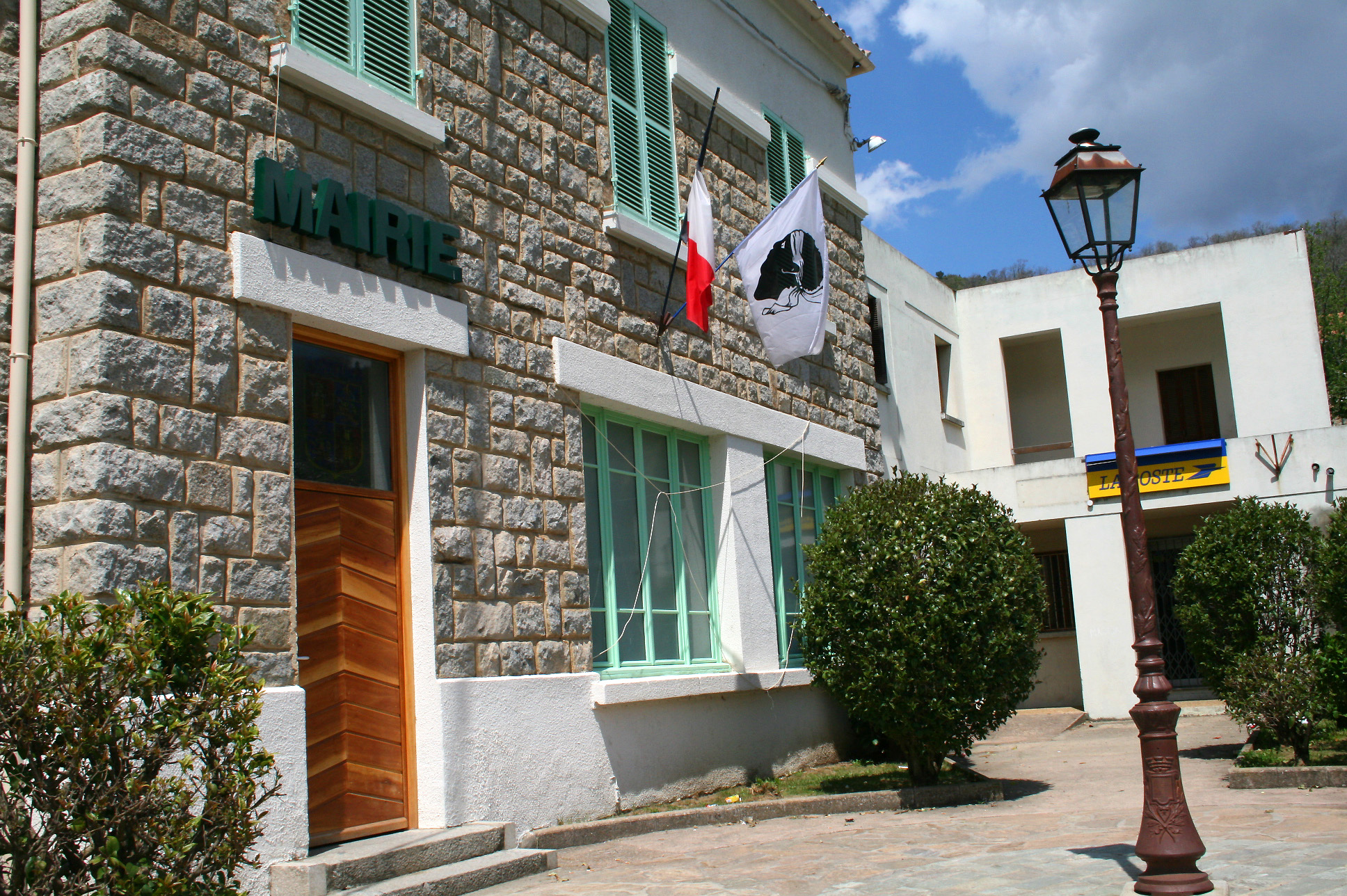
The Town Hall

List of Successive Mayors

From	To	Name	Party
1879		Alexandre Bolelli	
2001	2026	Jean-Baptiste Giffon	DVD

== Demography ==
Historical population

Year	Pop.	±% p.a.
1800	1,790	—
1806	1,798	+0.07%
1821	2,017	+0.77%
1831	2,314	+1.38%
1836	2,375	+0.52%
1841	2,420	+0.38%
1846	2,528	+0.88%
1851	2,605	+0.60%
1856	3,003	+2.88%
1861	3,071	+0.45%
1866	2,842	−1.54%
1872	2,934	+0.53%
1876	2,958	+0.20%
1881	3,196	+1.56%
1886	3,277	+0.50%
1891	3,367	+0.54%
1896	3,341	−0.15%
1901	3,582	+1.40%

Year	Pop.	±% p.a.
1906	3,689	+0.59%
1911	3,938	+1.31%
1921	3,661	−0.73%
1926	3,925	+1.40%
1931	4,125	+1.00%
1936	4,152	+0.13%
1946	3,367	−2.07%
1954	2,172	−5.33%
1962	833	−11.29%
1968	774	−1.22%
1975	762	−0.22%
1982	766	+0.07%
1990	436	−6.80%
1999	460	+0.60%
2007	525	+1.67%
2012	537	+0.45%
2017	533	−0.15%
2023	522	−0.35%

Source: EHESS and INSEE

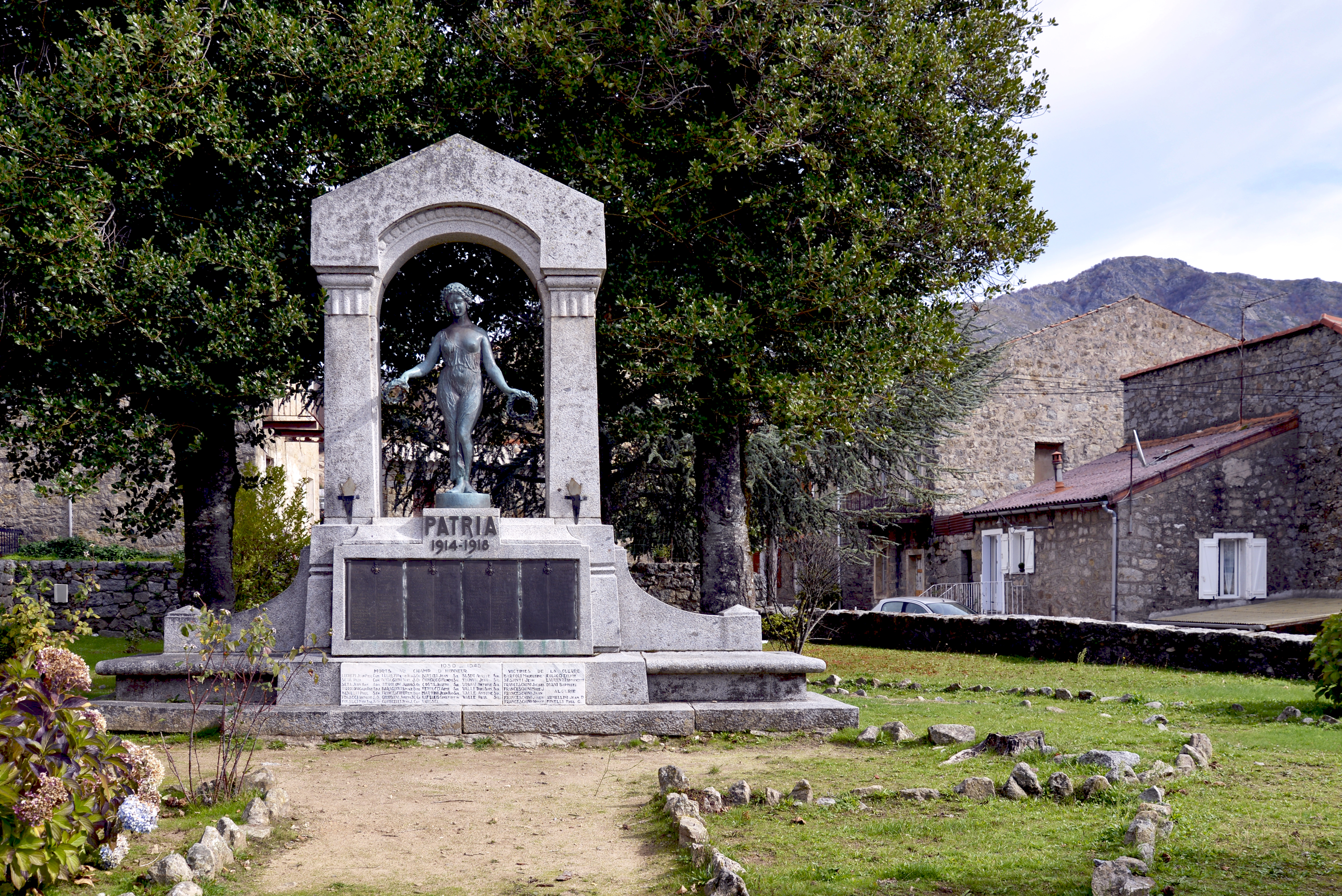
The War Memorial

=== Education ===
The commune has a public primary school.

=== Sports ===
The Val d'Ese ski resort is located in the commune.

== Culture and heritage ==
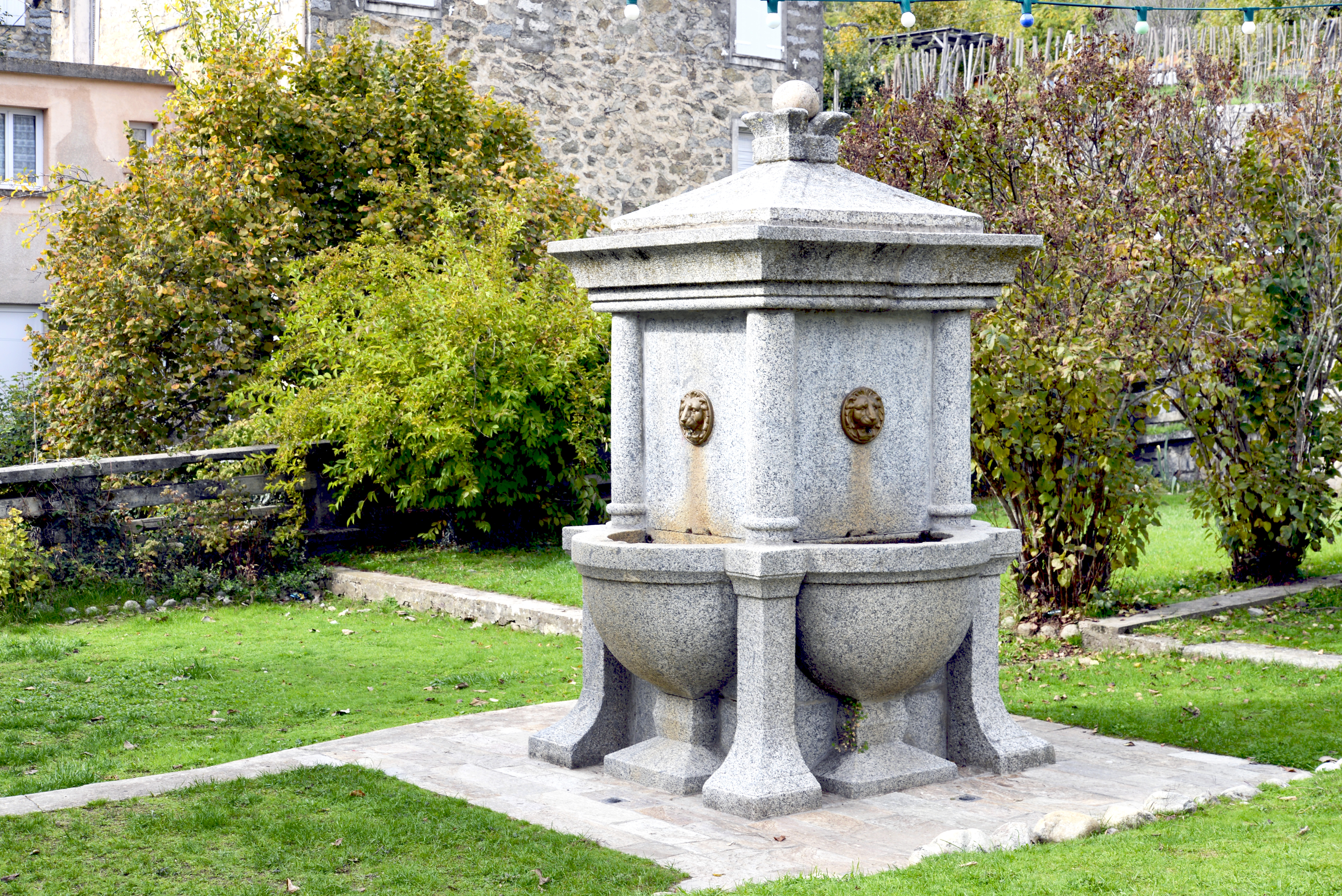
Boccialacce Fountain

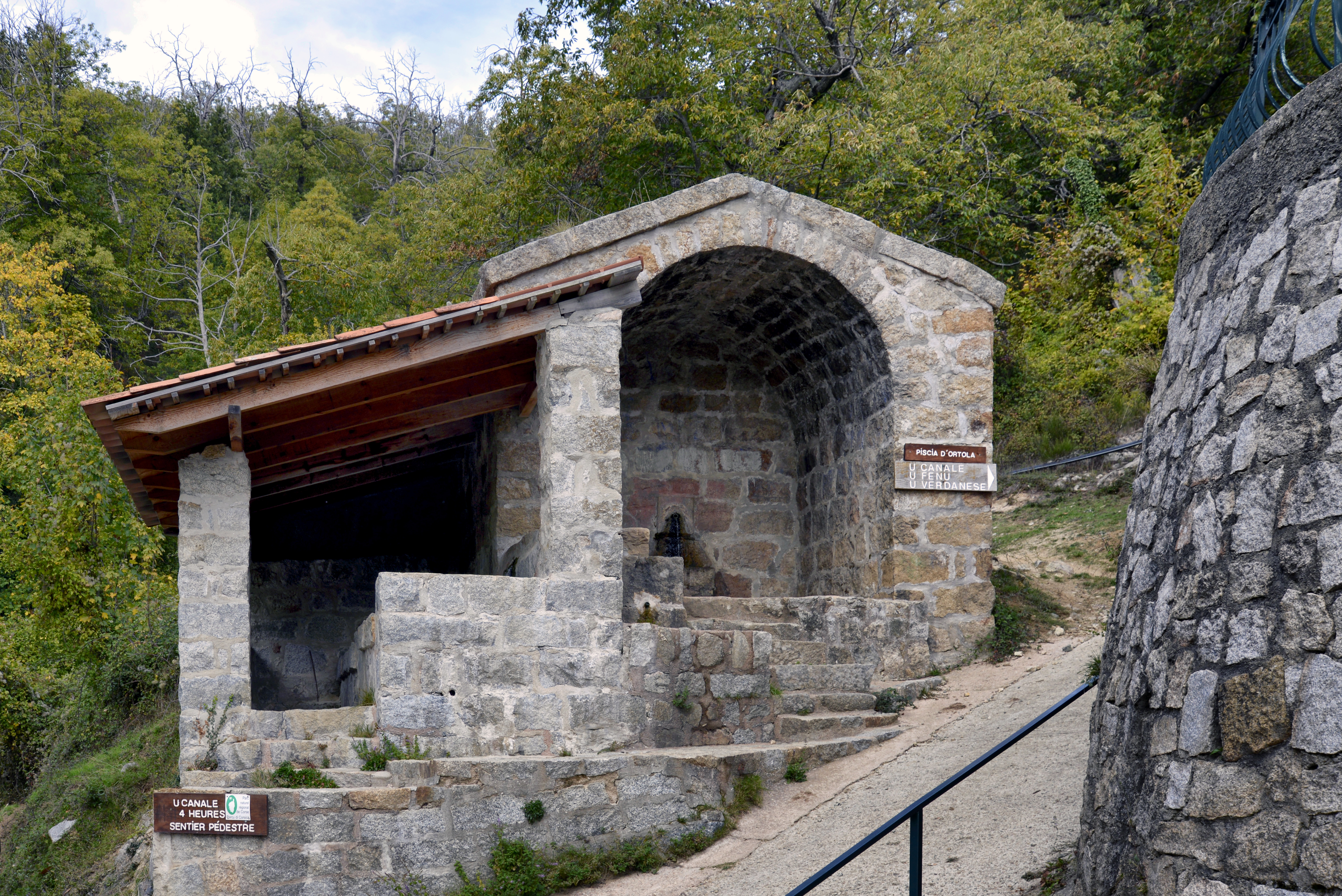
Fountain-Lavoir of Dominicacci

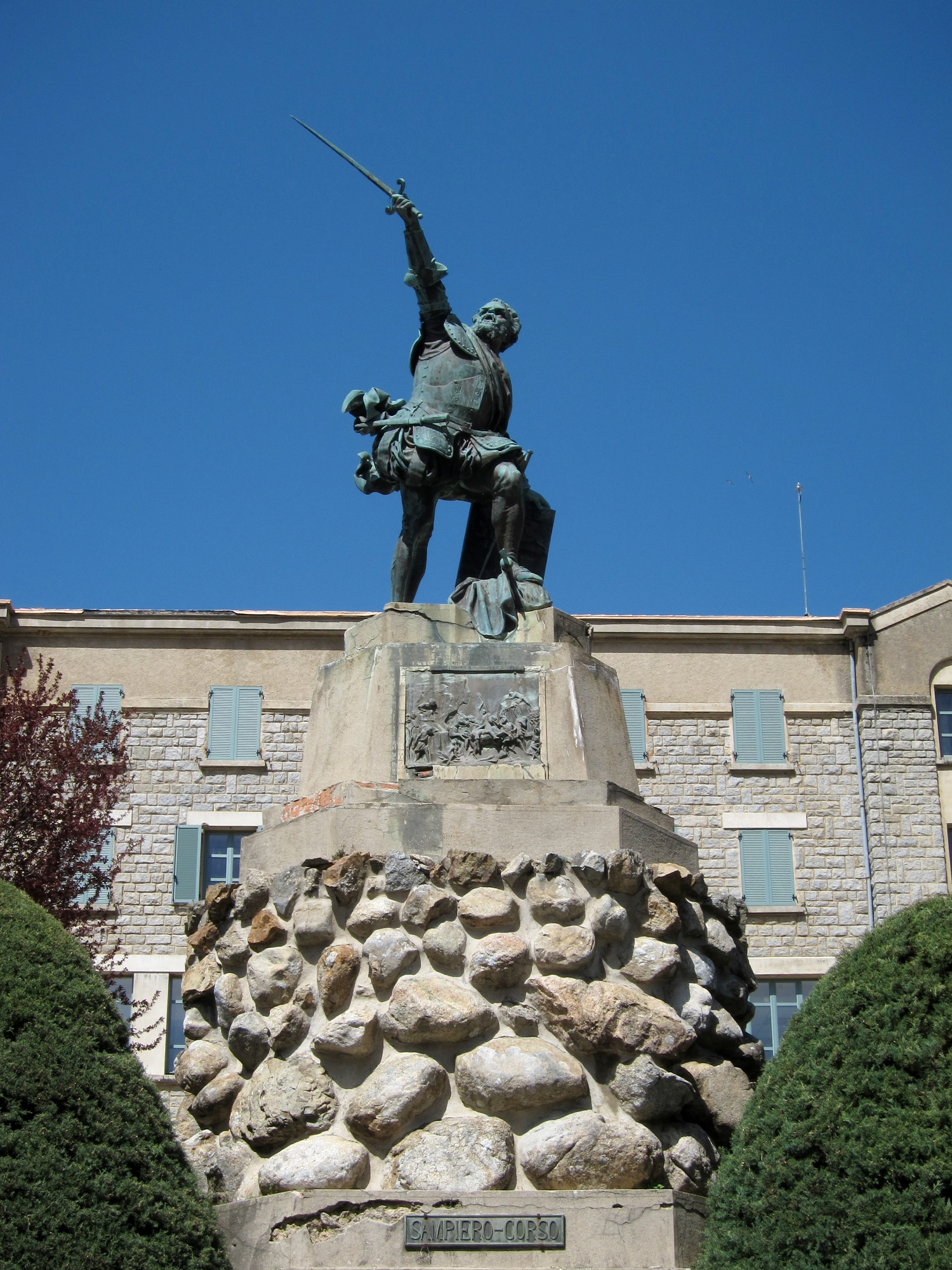
The monument to Sampiero Corso

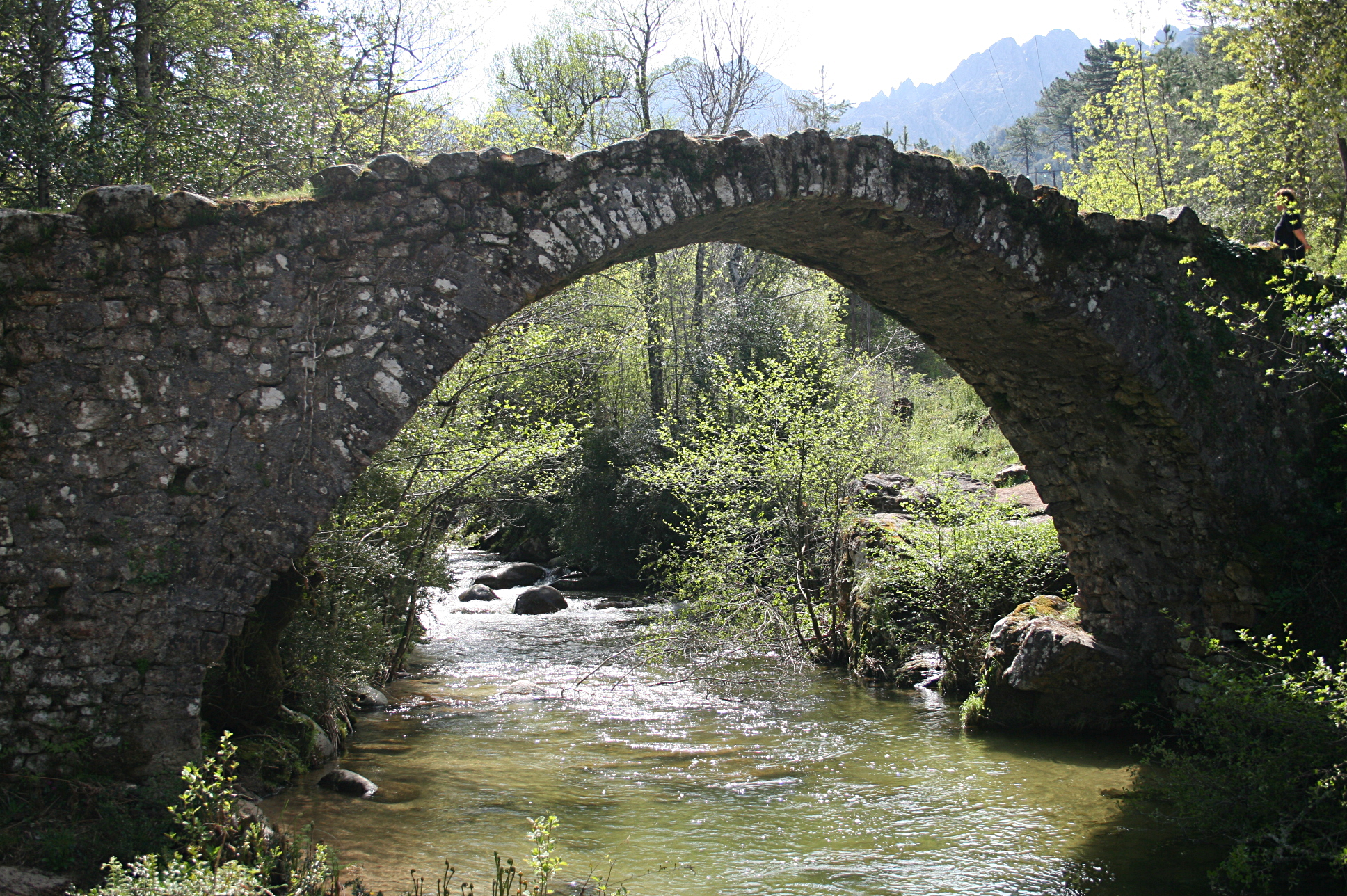
The Genovese Bridge

=== Civil heritage ===
- The War Memorial at Dominicacci
- Many Fountains and Lavoirs
  - Boccialacce Fountain;
  - Fountain-Lavoir of Piscia D'Urtolu at Stazzona;
  - Fountain of Dominicacci;
  - Fountain of Verga;
  - Funtana Maio Fountain at Vassalacci;
  - a Fountain-Lavoir called Fountain de Costa or Fountain de Tricolacci.

The commune has two sites that are registered as historical monuments:

- A Monument to Sampiero Corso (1890) The work of the sculptor Vital Gabriel Dubray, this bronze statue is 3.50m high and stands at a crossroads in the village centre between the parish church, the school (formerly the Saint Francis Convent), and the town hall.
- The Genovese Bridge at Zippitoli (15th century) In the 16th century the bridge provided a connection from Bastelica to Ajaccio. With a single arch, it is a humpbacked bridge like most of that time. It was abandoned during the construction of the "forest road No. 1 from Cauro to Bastelica" which is today the D27 road.

=== Religious heritage ===
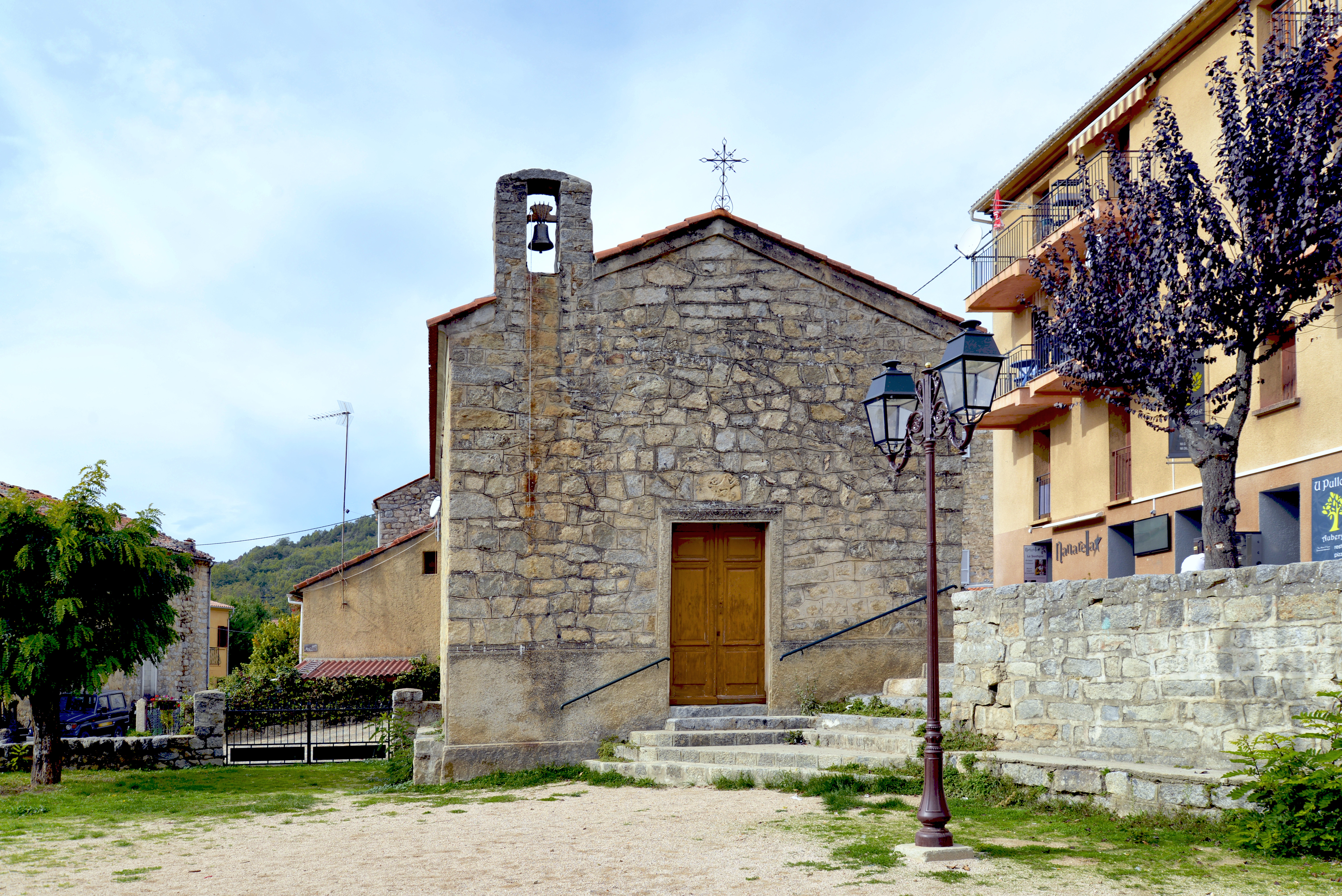
The Chapel of the Annunciation

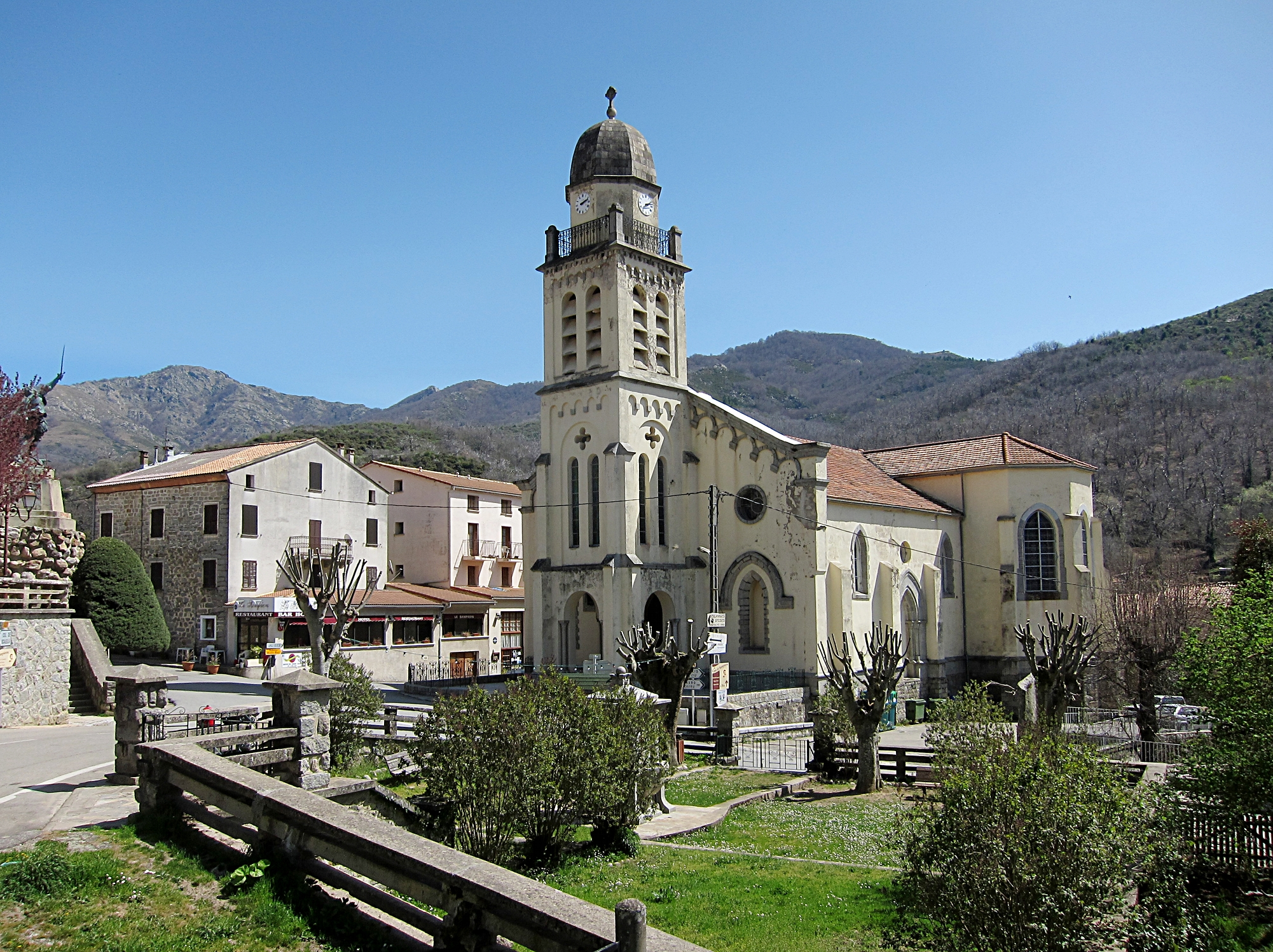
The Church of Saint-Michel

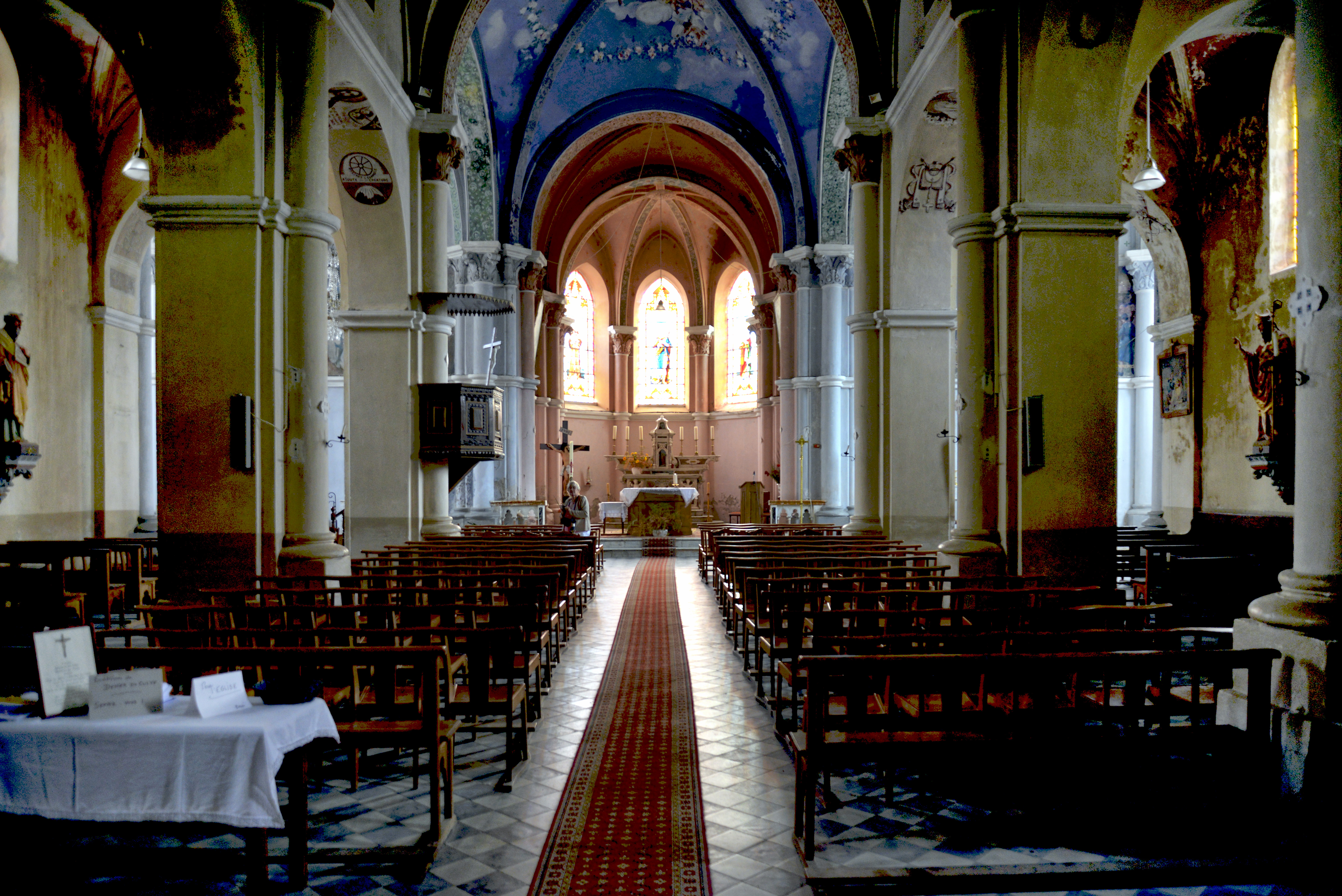
The interior of the church

- Chapel of the Annunciation (the Anunciata) at Dominicacci opposite the War Memorial.
- Chapel Notre-Dame-du-Mont-Carmel called a Ghjisgiola at Vassalacci.
- Chapel Sainte-Bernadette at Radicale.
- Chapel Sant'Austinu di Basterga at Sant'Agostino.
- The Parish Church of Saint Michel is in the Santo (Santu) district at the centre of the village. In Baroque style and built in the 17th century, it is built in the form of a Latin cross. The central nave is lined with square pillars and flanked by two aisles (or lateral naves) and is extended by a choir where there is the main Altar. There are two side chapels with side altars dedicated to Saint Michel and Saint Anthony of Padua. The bell tower porch is four storeys high with a symmetrical façade on the first two floors, topped by a triangular pediment, and crowned with a cupola. The Church contains several items that are registered as historical objects:
- A Stations of the Cross (14 stations) (1905)
- A Statue: Virgin and child (19th century)
- A Painting: The Calvary (17th century)
- A Stoup (17th century)
- An Altar and Tabernacle (17th century)
- A Statue: Saint Anthony of Padua (17th century)

=== Environmental heritage ===
Bastelica is part of the Regional Natural Park of Corsica in the "Land of Life" called Gravona.

Zone of Ecological Interest, Flora and Fauna (ZNIEFF)

The commune has eight 2nd generation ZNIEFF areas:

- The Pineta-Quarceta Forest and the Punta di Forca d'Olmu mountains, an area between 522 and 1679 metres above sea level covering 3007 hectares.
- The Forest of five communes and Col d'Arusula, an area of 2529 hectares of forest area lying north of the Col d'Arusula (1206m) covering over Frasseto and Guitera-les-Bains with an altitude between 789 and 1569m. The vegetation consists of green oak forests of Mediterranean type with beech and pine forests in the mountains.
- The Beech forests of Bastelica, an area of 946 hectares of forest ranging between 900 and 1750m altitude.
- The Chestnut-Beech Forests of Bastelica, an area wholly in Bastelica covering 1492 hectares of forest ranging between 700 and 1210m altitude.
- The Cirques and glacial lakes of Monte Renoso, an area of 1762 hectares covering three communes. It is centred on Monte Renoso and lies between 1600 and 2352m altitude.
- The Peaks and upper unforested slopes of Monte Renoso, an area covering eight communes lying between 950 and 2352 metres above sea level and covering 5111 hectares. It is an area traditionally used by shepherds for summer pastures and there are many sheep there in summer. The Ghisoni ski resort is on the eastern slope of Renoso and the Ese ski resort is above Bastelica.
- The Pine Forests in the upper ravine of Marmano, an area of 217 hectares located west of the Col de Verde and including the upper Marmano valley.
- The Beech-Pine forests of Punteniello, an area of 523 hectares of forest stretching between 1200 and 1800 m altitude.

Natura 2000 sites

- Sites of Community Importance (Dir. Habitat)
  - The Massif de Renoso, an area of 6107 hectares.
- Special Protection Area (Dir. Birds)
  - The Territorial Forests of Corsica, an area covering 13,223 hectares between 200 and 2057 metres altitude. There are three species of protected birds: the Northern goshawk ((Corsica ssp.) Accipiter gentilis arrigonii (Kleinschmidt, 1903)), the golden eagle (Aquila chrysaetos (Linnaeus, 1758)), and the Corsican nuthatch (Sitta whiteheadi Sharpe, 1884) in the high pine forests.

== Notable people linked to the commune ==
- Sampiero Corso, born in the commune on 23 mai 1498, failed to take the island from the Genovese. Died in an ambush on 5 January 1567 near the village of Eccica in a place that took the name of "Senza Populi" or "Tamanti Populi". His first name could come from Santu pieru (Saint Peter's day).
- Alphonse d'Ornano, son of Sampiero Corso, born in Bastelica in 1548, Marshal of France during the French Wars of Religion, he died at Bordeaux in 1610.

== See also ==
- Communes of the Corse-du-Sud department
