= Bocognano =

Commune in Corsica, France

- Commune
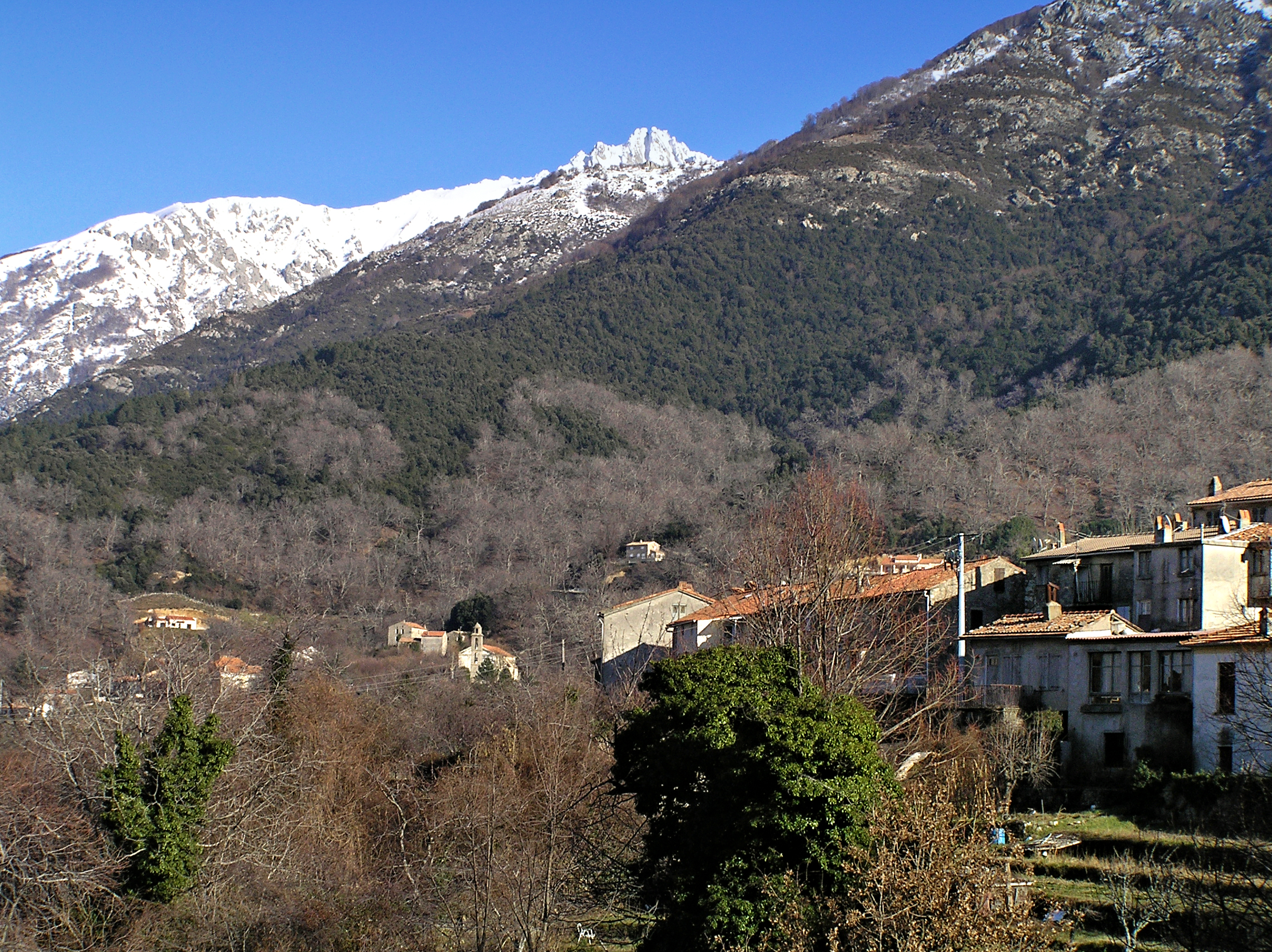
- A view of part of the village
- Location of Bocognano
- Location within France Location within Corsica
- Coordinates: 42°04′54″N 9°03′26″E
- Country: France
- Region: Corsica
- Department: Corse-du-Sud
- Arrondissement: Ajaccio
- Canton: Gravona-Prunelli

Government
  - Mayor (2020–2026): Achille Martinetti
- Area^{1}: 71.12 km^{2} (27.46 sq mi)
- Elevation: 700 m (2,300 ft)
- Highest elevation: 2,347 m (7,700 ft)
- Lowest elevation: 338 m (1,109 ft)
- Population (2023): 419
  - Density: 5.89/km^{2} (15.3/sq mi)
- Time zone: UTC+01:00 (CET)
  - Summer (DST): UTC+02:00 (CEST)
- INSEE/Postal code: 2A040 /20136
- ^{1} French Land Register data, which excludes lakes, ponds, glaciers > 1 km^{2} (0.386 sq mi or 247 acres) and river estuaries.

Bocognano (French pronunciation: [bɔkɔɲano]; Corsican: Bucugnà, [bu.ku.ɲa]) is a commune located in the department of Corse-du-Sud, on the island of Corsica, France. The village, situated at the south-western side of the climb to the Col de Vizzavona, belongs to the micro of Celavo which is historically the capital.

== Geography ==
=== Situation ===
Halfway between Ajaccio and Corte, the village of Bocognano is renowned for its privileged position at the foot of Monte d'Oro, its chestnut woods and waterfall Le Voile de la Mariée. Bocognano, along with 9 other communes, belongs to the canton of Celavo-Mezzana. It is in to the Regional Natural Park of Corsica, in the Gravona territory. Its natural heritage, the purity of its water sources, the quality of its welcome and climate make it a popular summer destination near Ajaccio.

=== Geology and terrain ===
Bocognano is a mountain village located in the granite part of the island. It occupies an area surrounded by chains of high mountains of the Monte d'Oro massif in the north, and the Monte Renoso Massif to the south, through which flows the Gravona river. It is the upper valley of the Gravona, the river taking its source on the slopes of Monte Renoso at 2,110 metres (6,920 ft) altitude.

=== Hydrography ===
The hydrographic network is dense. The river Gravona is fed by many streams which are only appointed on maps. Many springs rise in its territory and form natural fountains.

=== Climate and vegetation ===
The territory has a tiered vegetation. Below the rocky peaks, clouds, appear odorant alders (bassu in Corsican), and beech woodlands can be found at the top of the valley. Lower altitudes are covered by forests, mainly composed of oaks and pines, and the chestnut wood located in an area between 600 and 800 meters. Chestnut trees planted along the road north of the village attracts many collectors and gatherers at the time of hatching bugs.

Three communal forests cover a large part of the city:

- Bocognano / Pastricciola / Tavera (1451 ha);
- Bastelica / Bocognano (3957 ha);
- Azzana / Bocognano / Pastricciola / Rezza / Tavera (1045 ha).

Climate data for Bocognano (1981–2010 averages, extremes 1978–present)
Month	Jan	Feb	Mar	Apr	May	Jun	Jul	Aug	Sep	Oct	Nov	Dec	Year
Record high °C (°F)	21.0 (69.8)	23.0 (73.4)	28.5 (83.3)	29.0 (84.2)	34.0 (93.2)	36.0 (96.8)	40.0 (104.0)	40.5 (104.9)	35.5 (95.9)	31.2 (88.2)	25.0 (77.0)	20.0 (68.0)	40.5 (104.9)
Mean daily maximum °C (°F)	10.6 (51.1)	11.3 (52.3)	14.0 (57.2)	16.5 (61.7)	21.2 (70.2)	25.2 (77.4)	29.4 (84.9)	29.5 (85.1)	24.4 (75.9)	19.8 (67.6)	14.5 (58.1)	11.3 (52.3)	19.0 (66.2)
Daily mean °C (°F)	6.3 (43.3)	6.6 (43.9)	8.9 (48.0)	11.2 (52.2)	15.6 (60.1)	19.2 (66.6)	22.7 (72.9)	22.5 (72.5)	18.4 (65.1)	14.7 (58.5)	10.2 (50.4)	7.3 (45.1)	13.7 (56.7)
Mean daily minimum °C (°F)	2.0 (35.6)	1.9 (35.4)	3.8 (38.8)	5.9 (42.6)	9.9 (49.8)	13.1 (55.6)	15.9 (60.6)	15.6 (60.1)	12.4 (54.3)	9.7 (49.5)	5.9 (42.6)	3.3 (37.9)	8.3 (46.9)
Record low °C (°F)	−7.9 (17.8)	−9.5 (14.9)	−6.0 (21.2)	−2.0 (28.4)	0.5 (32.9)	4.0 (39.2)	7.0 (44.6)	5.5 (41.9)	4.4 (39.9)	0.0 (32.0)	−3.0 (26.6)	−6.3 (20.7)	−9.5 (14.9)
Average precipitation mm (inches)	110.2 (4.34)	103.2 (4.06)	99.9 (3.93)	129.5 (5.10)	87.6 (3.45)	56.7 (2.23)	24.2 (0.95)	38.5 (1.52)	104.7 (4.12)	143.0 (5.63)	187.3 (7.37)	188.8 (7.43)	1,273.6 (50.14)
Average precipitation days (≥ 1.0 mm)	9.5	9.7	9.5	11.4	8.8	6.2	3.1	3.9	7.3	9.8	11.7	11.7	102.6
Source: Meteo France

=== Channels of communication and transport ===
Bocognano is distant 38 km from the Ajaccio-Napoléon Bonaparte airport, and 42 km from the commercial port of Ajaccio.

==== Road access ====
Bocognano is accessible by car ( RN 193 ) from Ajaccio (36 km), and Corte (41 km). To come from Corte, one must cross the pass of Vizzavona (altitude 1163 m). In winter, it is prudent to bring chains. The D27 is a road which connects the RN 193 from Bocognano to the RN 196 in Cauro. This small road provides access to the nearby village of Bastelica after a winding 22 km route crossing the neck of the Scalella (1193 m). It is sometimes closed in winter.

==== Road haulage ====
A service of passenger transport by bus (bus Corsica), provided by the carrier EUROCORSE Travel makes every day except Sundays and holidays, links Corte-Ajaccio-Bastia and vice versa.

==== Rail Transport ====
Bocognano is served by the line of Railways of Corsica. It has a railway station.

=== Urbanization ===
Bocognano is a large village, situated at an average altitude of 650 meters. It is composed of eleven hamlets: Celli, Busso, Poggiola, Moraschi and Corsacci being the most important, Pietrajolo, Quercioli, Gare, Colleta, Villanova and Erbajo. Inhabitants were once nomadic herders who practiced transhumance; they spent the summer pastures in the mountains (a muntagnera) and winter on the coast (the impiaghjera), especially in the plains' of Afa . Houses with two or three floors and red roofs present austere facades. Some small businesses are open in Corsacci (bar, bakery, butcher, restaurant, etc.). In Corsacci, Bocognano has a post office, the Office of Tourism of Upper Gravona open during the summer, an elementary school, a center for 1st intervention Fire Brigade and a brigade of the National Gendarmerie. Once existed above the hamlet of Busso, the castle of Count Busso. A legend says that one can see some evenings, at night, flames near the castle. They come from damned souls of the Count who can not find rest. There are many sheepfolds in altitude, although many are no longer occupied for summer pastures.

== Policy and Administration ==
List of mayors
Period	Identity	Label
1965-1983	Pierre Muraccioli	
1983-2014	Martin Muraccioli	UDF And UMP
2014-incumbent	Achille Martinetti	

== Population and Society ==
=== Population ===
Historical population
Year	Pop.	±% p.a.
1968	404	—
1975	340	−2.43%
1982	315	−1.09%
1990	290	−1.03%
1999	343	+1.88%
2007	466	+3.91%
2012	454	−0.52%
2017	396	−2.70%
2023	419	+0.95%
Source: INSEE

=== Cultural events and festivities ===
==== Festimonti ====
Festimonti is the annual festival of the mountain. It is organized since 2001 by the association U Liamu Gravunincu in collaboration with the municipality of Bocognano. Its mission is to promote and enhance the micro Valley Gravona. The event takes place on the last weekend of September or in October.

==== Fiera di a Castagna ====
The chestnut fair (Fiera di a Casagna in Corsican) is probably the most famous agricultural fair in Corsica. Since 1982, Fiera di a Castagna takes place the first weekend of December. Organized by the Foyer Rural U Castagnu, this fair is the main event of the end of the year: it attracts thousands of visitors from all corners of the island and more than 150 exhibitors. In a structure of 3000 m 2 the best food and handicrafts of the island are represented. If the chestnut, particularly in flour, is the key element of the event, there are also certified products such as honey, brocciu, hazelnut, wine, olive oil, but no charcuterie (the island's speciality). Sweets and chocolates, pastries, beer and cheeses are also honored. The craftsmanship is also very well represented through pottery, cutlery, and woodworking. Booths expose the Corsican literature in all areas, let others find the old songs and melodies on CD. The entertainment is provided by local radio France Bleu Frequenza Corsica Mora .

=== Sports ===
==== Football ====
The Sporting Club Bocognano Gravona (SCBG) is the village's football club. It was created in 1986 on the initiative of the village youth. The club now plays in Division of honor and has 180 licensees. In addition to its first team the club has six categories of youth, from beginners to U19. The club operates at the municipal stadium located south of the village. The stadium was renovated in 2009 and features a synthetic lawn. President since its creation: Michel Galea - François Mancini - Francis Padovani - François Casasoprana - Franck Risterucci (since 2001). The club has a website .

== See also ==
- Communes of the Corse-du-Sud department
- Angèle Chevrin
