= Col de Vizzavona =

Mountain pass in Corsica, France

- Corsican: Bocca di Vizzavona
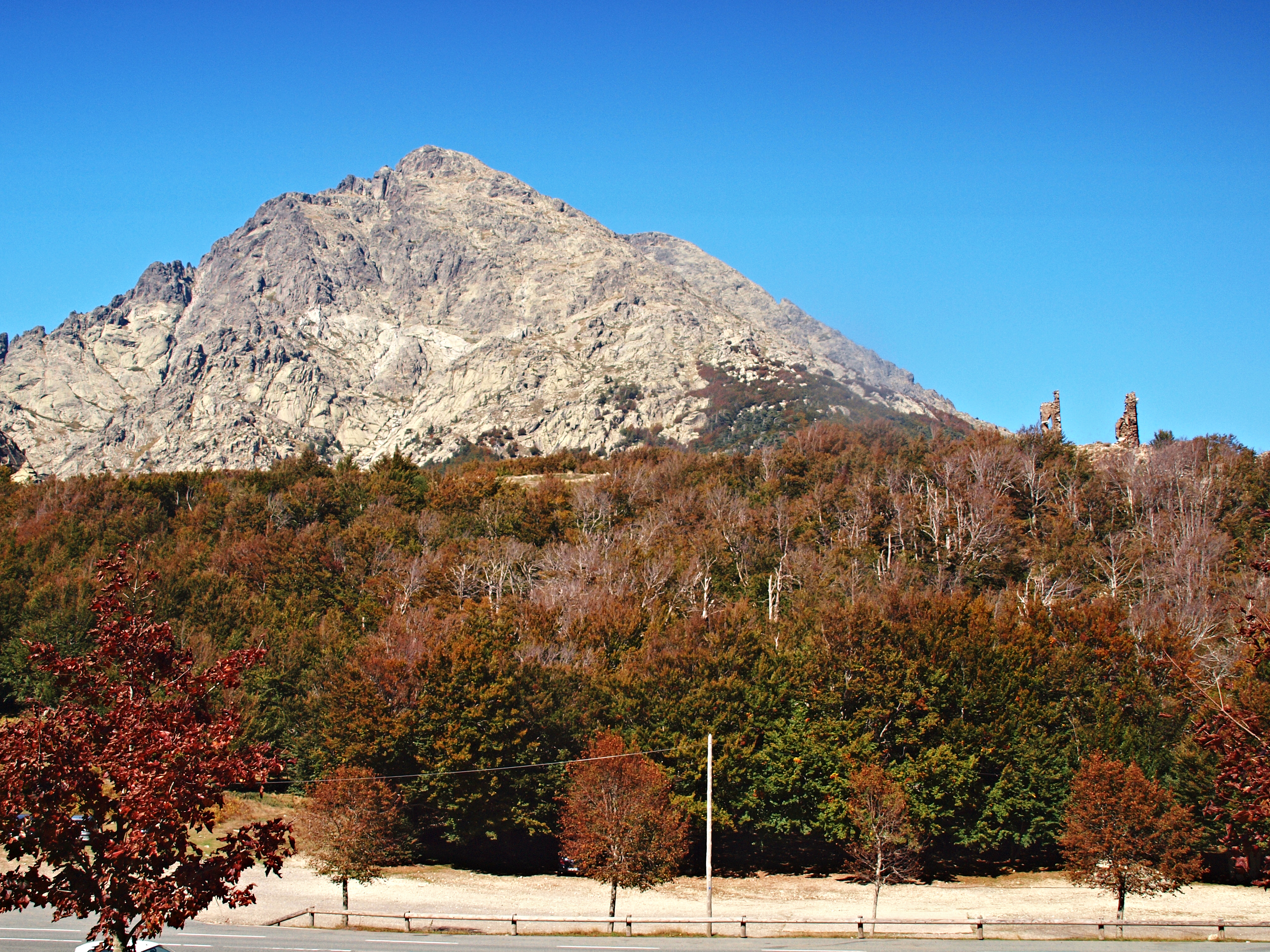
- Monte d'Oro and Fort de Vaux from Col de Vizzavona

- Location within Corsica
- Elevation: 1,163 metres (3,816 ft)
- Traversed by: RN193

Third Approach
- Location: Haute-Corse, Corsica, France
- Coordinates: 42°06′42″N 9°06′44″E

Col de Vizzavona (Corsican: Bocca di Vizzavona) 1,163 m (3,816 ft) is a mountain pass at the centre of the French island of Corsica.

== Location ==
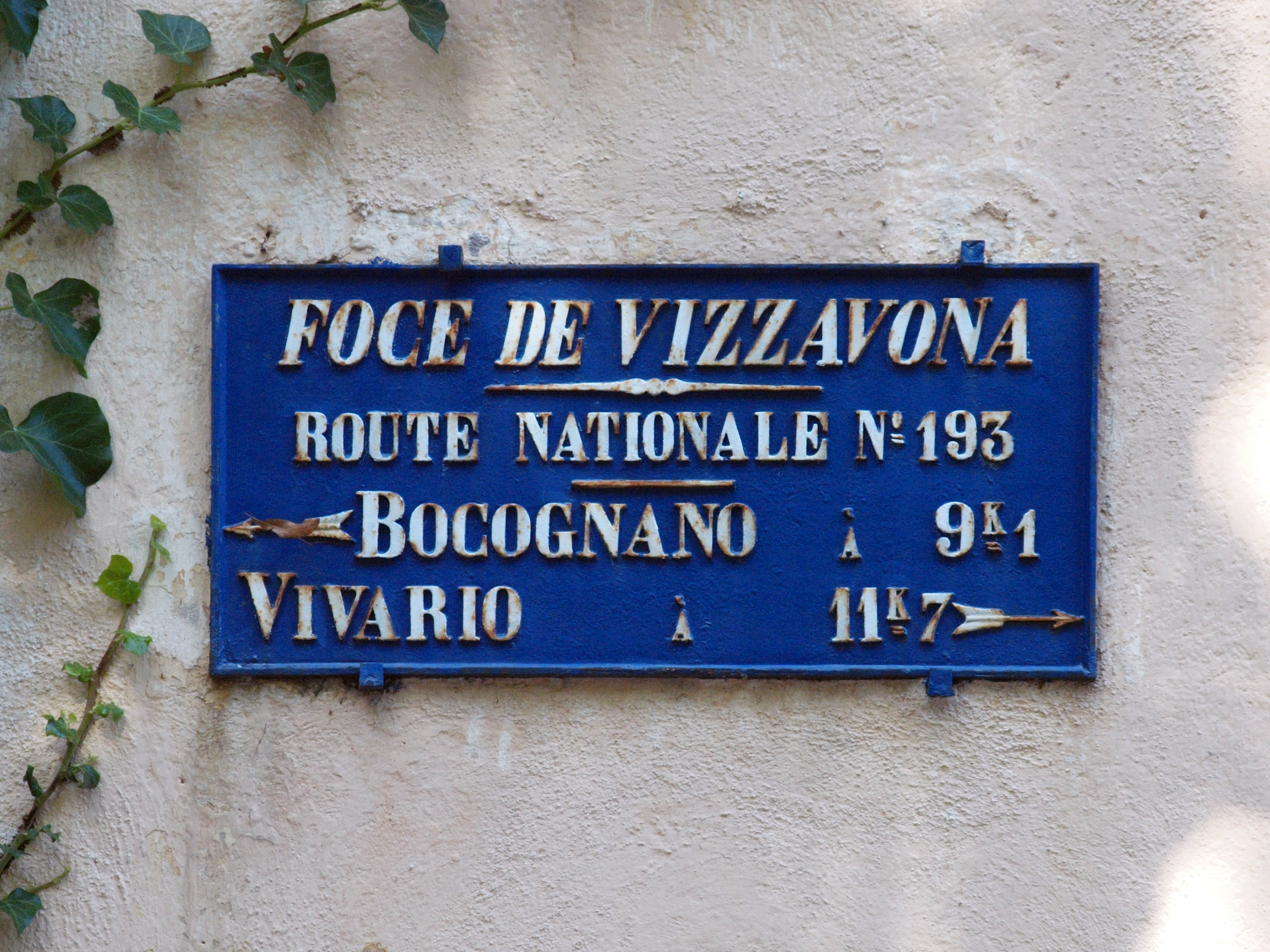
Old sign at the col

Col de Vizzavona is located between the two major peaks on Corsica: the Monte d'Oro (altitude 2,389 m (7,838 ft)), 3 km north-northwest, and the Monte Renoso (2,352 m (7,717 ft)), 6 km south-southeast. The pass, located in the Regional Natural Park of Corsica, is traversed by the RN193 road and connects the Vecchio Valley with the Gravona river and with the Gulf of Ajaccio.

== Details of the climb ==
From the north-east, the climb commences at the village of Vivario from where the ascent is 12.4 km (7.7 mi) long. Over this distance, the road climbs 503 m (1,650 ft) at an average gradient of 4.1%, although there are several downhill sections. The final 4.6 km (2.9 mi) is at an average gradient of 6.5%; this was the route used in the Tour de France 2013.

From the south-west, the climb starts at the junction with the D29 road, close to the small village of Ucciani. From here, the ascent is 19.6 km (12.2 mi) long climbing 868 m (2,848 ft). The average gradient is 4.4%. En route, the road passes through the large village of Bocognano.

== Tour de France ==
In June 2013, the Col de Vizzavona was crossed by the Tour de France, which passed through the island for the first time in the event's 100-year history. Stage 2 of the race, between Bastia and Ajaccio, crossed the Col de Vizzavona. The climb was ranked Category 2 in the "King of the Mountains" competition, with Pierre Rolland being the first across the summit.
