= Gravona =

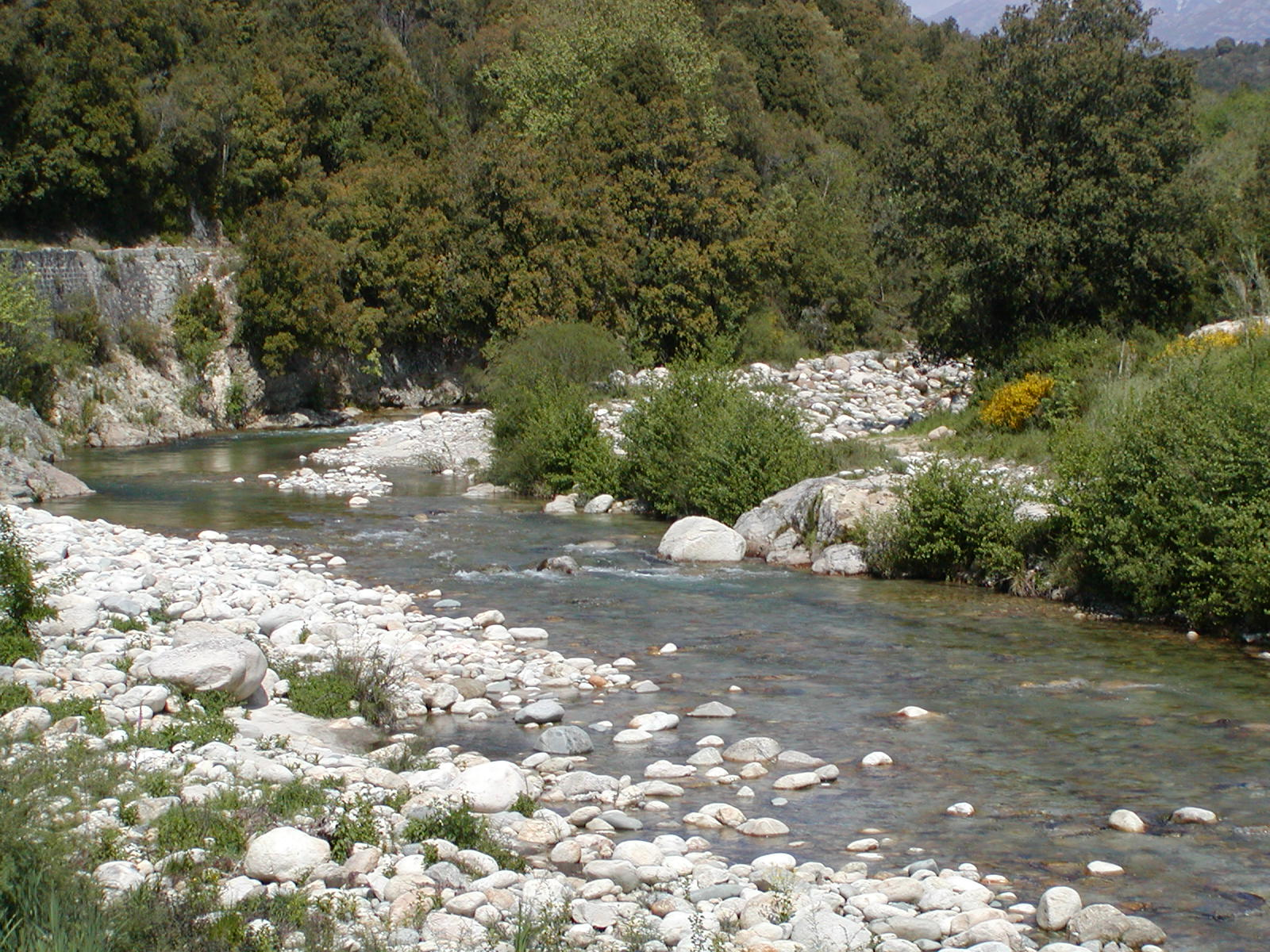
- Upper Gravona

Physical characteristics
- Source
  - location: Monte Renoso
  - elevation: 1,700 m (5,600 ft) (approx.)
- Mouth: Mediterranean Sea
  - location: Near Ajaccio
  - coordinates: 41°54′17″N 8°47′54″E
  - elevation: 0 m (0 ft)
- Length: 46.4 km (28.8 mi)
- Basin size: 298.98 km^{2} (115.44 sq mi)
- Discharge
  - average: 0 to very low

The Gravona is a river on the island of Corsica, France. It flows from the center of the island southwest to the Gulf of Ajaccio. Its entire course is in the Corse-du-Sud Department of France. It is 46.4 km (28.8 mi) long. The Gravona Valley conducts the main highway, Route N193, from the capital city, Ajaccio, to the Col de Vizzavona, where it goes through the pass and down to Corte and Bastia. At its upper end the Gravona is a crystal-clear mountain stream cascading over falls and rapids into trout-filled pools. At its lower end nearly all of the Gravona's flow serves to water the densely urban area of Ajaccio.

== Geography ==
The source of the river Gravona lies in the Ruisseau de Capiajola on the slopes of the 2,352 metres (7,717 ft) Monte Renoso in the center of the island. The brook becomes the river and then flows past the base of the 1,161 m (3,809 ft) Col de Vizzavona between Monte Renoso and the higher 2,389 m (7,838 ft) Monte d'Oro, joining the Ruisseau de Petra Longa and then the Ruisseau de Foce, which comes down from higher up in the col. Route N193 and the narrow-gauge railway, Chemin de Fer de Corse, from Ajaccio leave the Gravona River Valley at that point and go over the pass to Corte. On the other side of the col from which the Ruisseau de Capiajola flows is the source of the river Prunelli, which runs parallel to the Gravona and has the same effluent. On the other side of the Col Vizzavona is the source of the Vecchio River leading to the other side of Corsica.

Below the col the Gravona valley is considered one of the most scenic in Corsica. The river begins with a low gradient and then falls sharply over rapids and falls by stages. Each stage is a pool containing native brown trout. The river is popular for fly fishing and also for white-water canoeing. The road and the rail line remain close to the stream.

Various brooks fall into the Gravona from the sides of the valley, but no rivers of note. At its lower end the waters of the Gravona are entirely commandeered or nearly so as a water supply for the Ajaccio region, which takes up the entire Gulf of Ajaccio. Gravona Canal branches from the right bank about 19 kilometres (12 mi) from Ajaccio and follows it more or less in parallel as an aqueduct, entering the city to the north. It was designed in the mid-19th century as a source for the fountains, then a public water supply. Today the main stream of the Gravona flows around a reservoir near the airport, into which water can be shunted. The alluvial plain of the lower river, once called the Campo dell'Oro, is occupied by the airport. After the reservoir the river is joined by a branch of the Prunelli and exits into the gulf. Flow is so diminished that the mouth is nearly entirely blocked by a sandbar across which a small stream may or may not flow.
