= Angèle Chevrin =

French politician (1911–1998

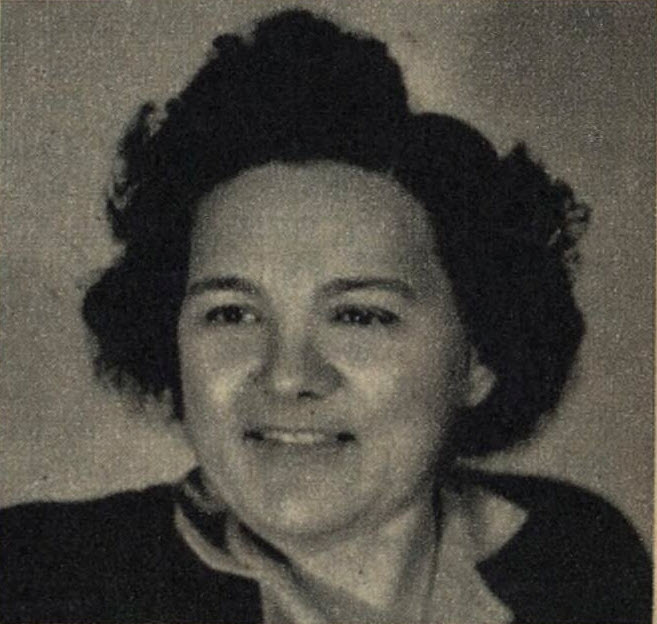
- Chevrin in April 1950

Deputy of the National Assembly
- In office 31 March 1950 – 4 July 1951
- President: Vincent Auriol
- Prime Minister: René Pleven
- Preceded by: Henri Lozeray
- Parliamentary group: Communist group
- Constituency: Cher

Personal details
- Born: Angèle Giacomoni; 1 July 1911 Bocognano, Corsica, France
- Died: 26 November 1998 (aged 87) 11th arrondissement of Paris, France
- Party: French Communist Party
- Other political affiliations: Union des femmes françaises
- Spouses: Louis Chevrin (m. 1938; died 1943); Arthur Giovoni (m. 1953; died 1996)

Military service
- Allegiance: Free France
- Branch/service: French Resistance
- Years of service: 1940–1944
- Battles/wars: World War II

Angèle Chevrin (née Giacomoni; 1911–1998) was a French communist politician from Corsica.

== Biography ==
Angèle Giacomoni was born into a family of farmers in Bocognano, Corsica, on 1 July 1911. After graduating from school, she moved to the Corsican capital of Ajaccio, where she worked for the public treasury and joined the French Communist Party (PCF). In 1935, she moved to the 11th arrondissement of Paris, where she became the secretary of the local PCF cell. In February 1938, she married fellow communist activist Louis Chevrin and moved to his hometown of Bourges, where she began training in pyrotechnics.

During the Nazi occupation of France, the Chevrin couple joined the French Resistance and conducted sabotage actions in Cher. On 3 April 1943, the couple were arrested in Bourges. They were transferred to a prison in Orléans; Angèle was released in July, but the Nazis shot Louis in October. Angèle Chevrin subsequently returned to Paris, where she rejoined the Resistance as part of the Union des femmes françaises (UFF).

Following the Liberation of France, in October 1944, Chevrin returned to Cher, where she took the post of national secretary of the UFF and joined the federal committee of the PCF. She was elected to the Bourges town council and ran unsuccessfully in the legislative elections of October 1945 and June 1946. In 1947, she moved back to Paris, where she enrolled in the PCF's cadre school. In March 1950, she replaced Henri Lozeray as the PCF deputy for Cher in the National Assembly, where she sat on the committees for communications, tourism and pensions. On 30 January 1951, she motioned for an interpellation on the dissolution of the Women's International Democratic Federation; on 26 April, she tabled a bill to abolish taxes on basic necessities; and on 7 May, she voted against an electoral reform bill that introduced a system of apparentments.

She ran for re-election in the 1951 French legislative election, but despite winning 48,708 out of 138,021 votes, she was not elected; as a result of the apparentment system, she lost the election to two right-wing candidates, despite winning more votes than both combined. She ultimately decided not to stand again in the 1956 election. In April 1953, she married Arthur Giovoni, a veteran of the Corsican Resistance and a PCF deputy for Corsica. She died in the 11th arrondissement of Paris, on 26 November 1998.

== Bibliography ==
- "Angèle, Marie Chevrin Née Giacomoni". National Assembly (in French). 2019.
- Pennetier, Claude (8 August 2014) [25 October 2008]. "CHEVRIN Angèle [née GIACOMONI Angèle, Marie, épouse CHEVRIN, puis épouse GIOVONI]". Le Maitron (in French). OCLC 1158613719.
