= Monte Renoso =

Mountain in Corsica, France

- Monti Rinosu (Corsican)
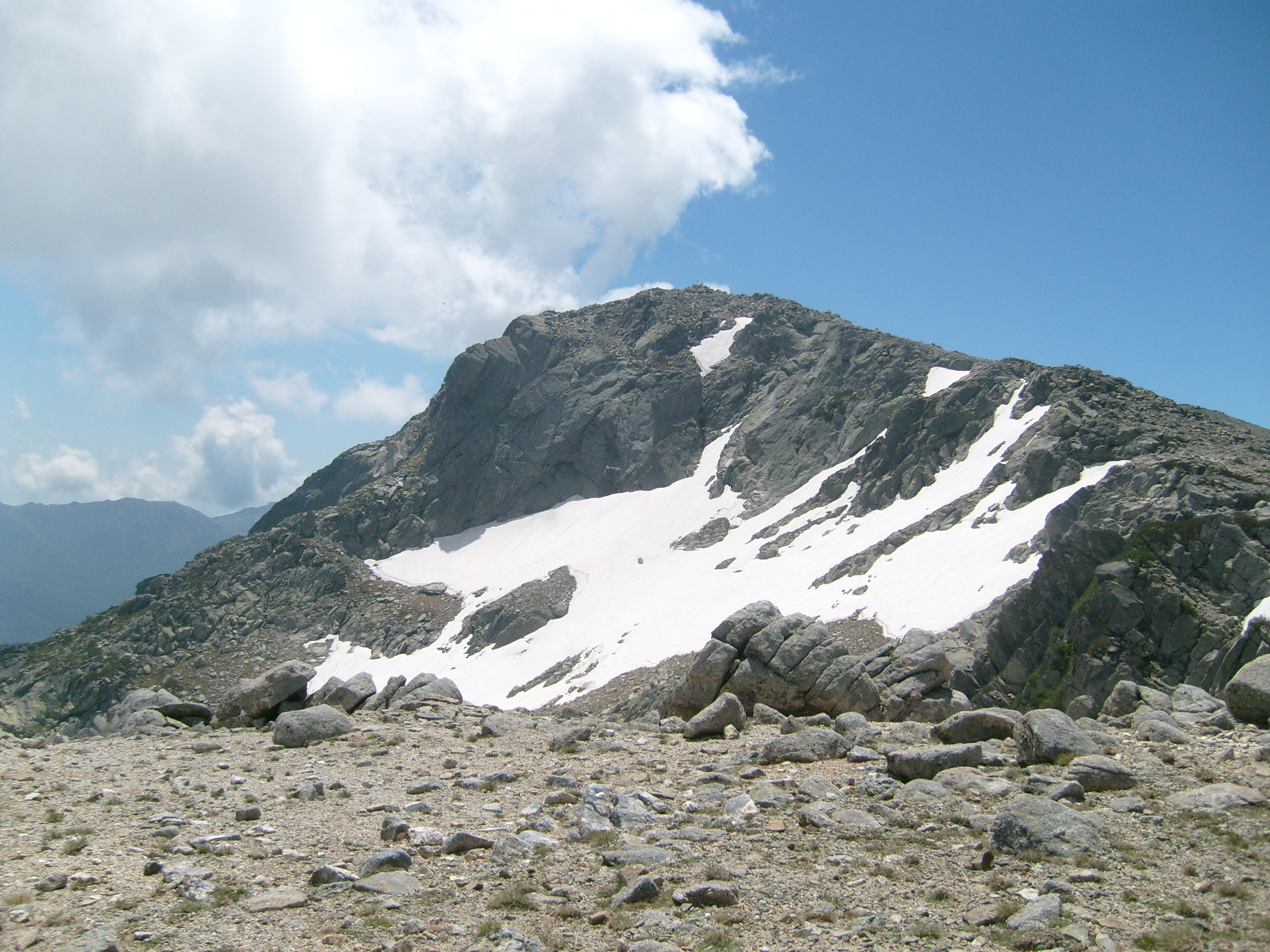

Highest point
- Elevation: 2,352 m (7,717 ft)
- Prominence: 1,191 m (3,907 ft)
- Isolation: 9.12 km (5.67 mi)
- Listing: Ribu
- Coordinates: 42.0595°N 9.1338°E

Geography
- Location within Corsica
- Country: France
- Department: Haute-Corse

Geology
- Formed by: Fold and thrust belt
- Orogeny: Alpine orogeny
- Rock age: Cretaceous
- Rock type: Ophiolite

Monte Renoso (Corsican: Monti Rinosu) is a mountain in the departments of Haute-Corse and Corse-du-Sud on the island of Corsica, France. It is the highest peak in the Monte Renoso Massif.

== Location ==
The peak of Monte Renoso is on the boundary between the commune of Ghisoni in Haute-Corse and the communes of Bastelica and Bocognano in Corse-du-Sud. The peak is located on the S-shaped backbone of the island. The 2,247 metres (7,372 ft) Punta Bacinello is to the north, the 2,255 metres (7,398 ft) Punta alla Vetta is to the west and the 2,273 metres (7,457 ft) Punta Orlandino is to the south. Lac de Bastani is to the north of the peak, and Lac de Nielluccio is to the east. Lac de Bastiani is a glacier lake that is ice-covered far into the summer.

== Physical ==
Monte Renoso has a prominence of 1,189 metres (3,901 ft) and elevation of 2,352 metres (7,717 ft). It is isolated by 9.12 kilometres (5.67 mi) from its nearest higher neighbor, Monte d'Oro, to the north-northwest. Ski runs were established on the lower slopes to the northeast of the summit, but have since been abandoned due to lack of dependable snow. The hike to the top from the north is straightforward, but the hiker has to scale many large granite boulders. Even in summer, the weather on the mountain can be unpredictable.

== 1962 airplane crash ==
On the 29th of December 1962, the Boeing 307 Stratoliner of Air Nautic left Bastia bound for Nice via Ajaccio. Passengers included the men's and women's senior teams of the BBCB, the Bastia basketball club. The plane crashed on Monte Renoso above Ghisoni. None of the 25 passengers and crew survived. Bad weather conditions preventing rescuers from gaining quick access to the crash site.

== Gallery ==
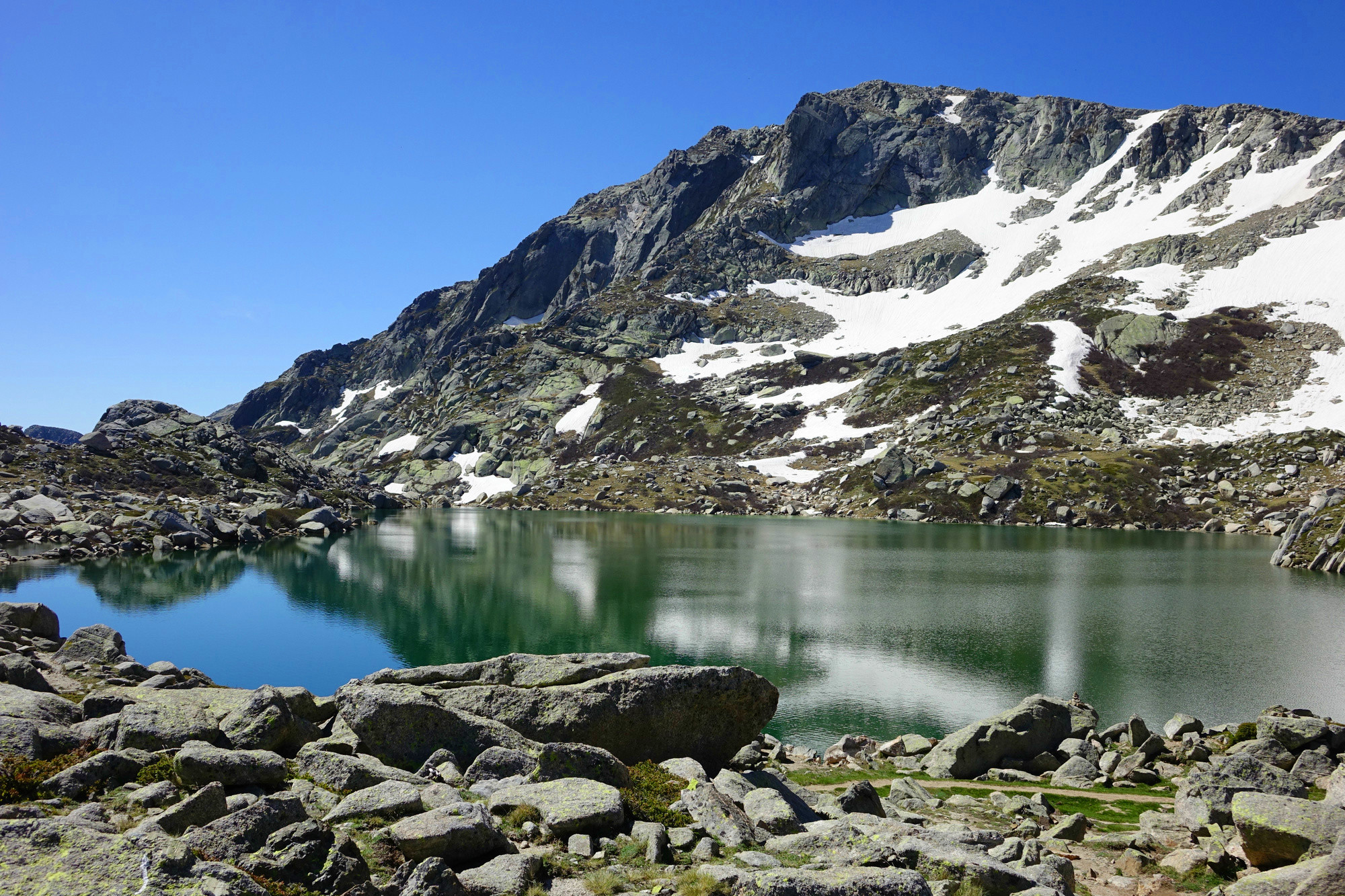
Monte Renoso from Lac de Bastani

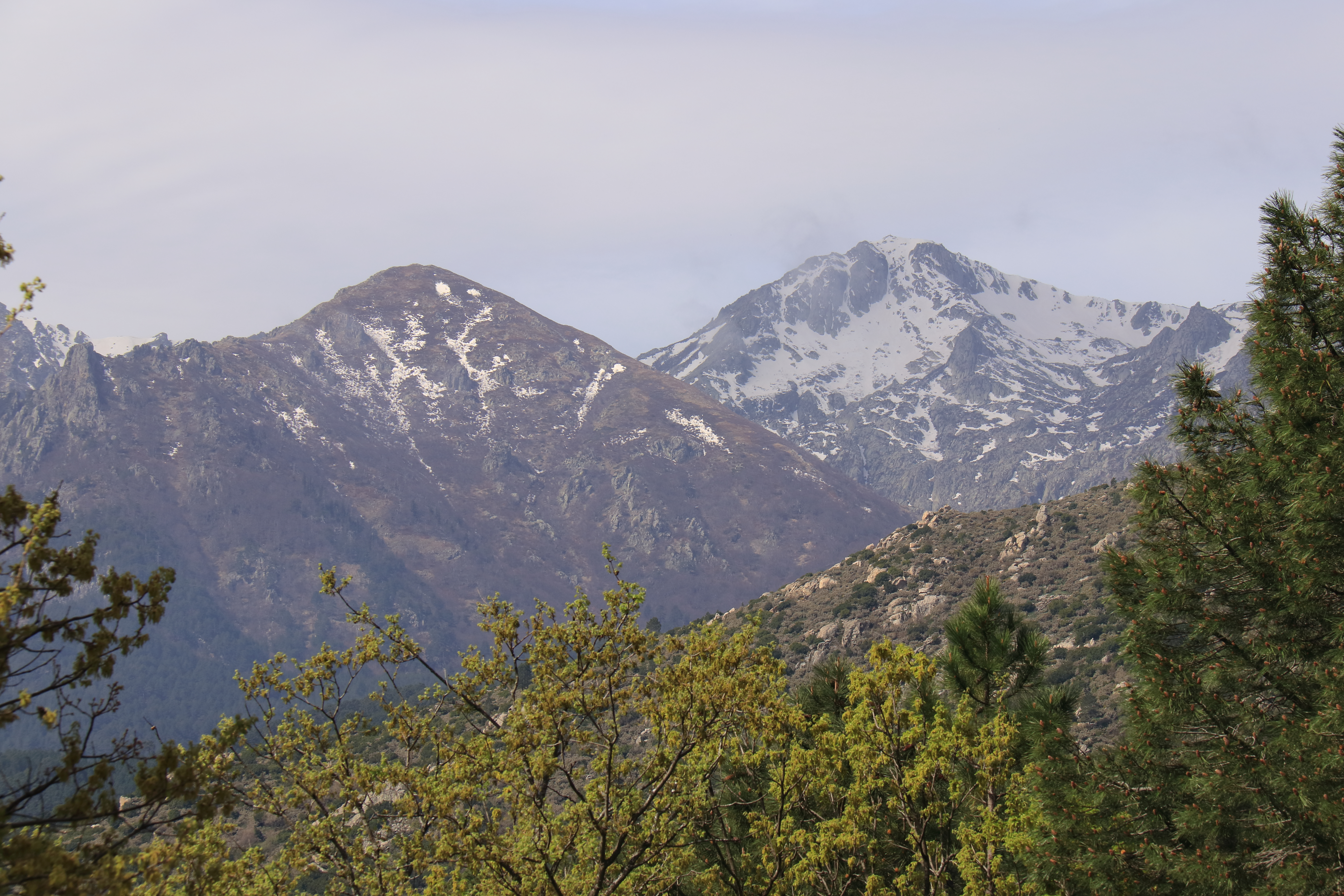
Monte Renoso from Ghisoni

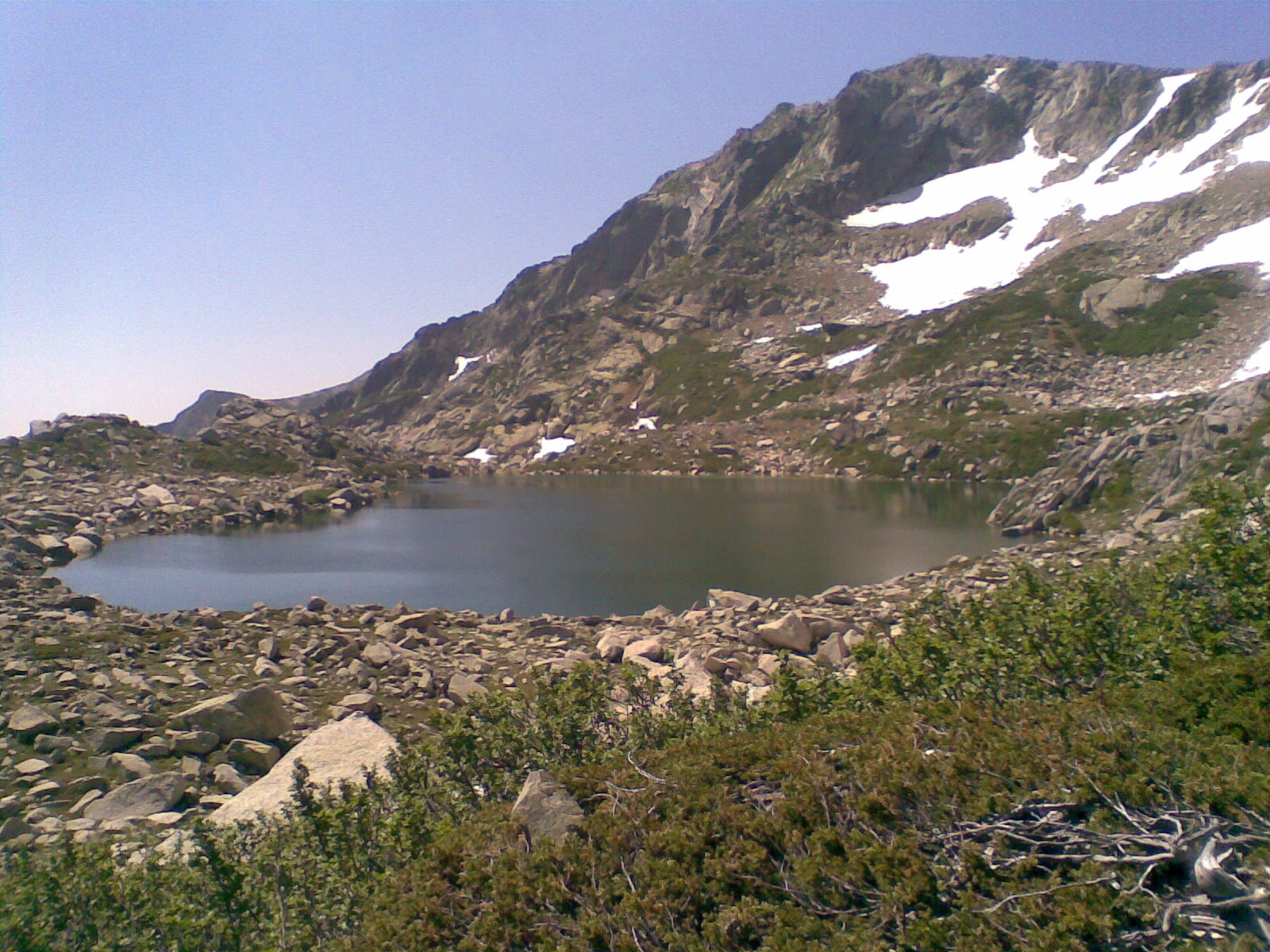
Lac de Bastani with Monte Renoso in background

== Sources ==
- "Monte Renoso, France", peakbagger
- "Monte Renoso", summitpost
- "Node: Monte Renoso (763323197)", OpenStreetMap
- Tieri, Sebastien (29 December 2012), "Drame du Renoso : l'émotion 50 ans après", France 3 (in French)
