= Vivario =

Vivario Vivariu
- Commune
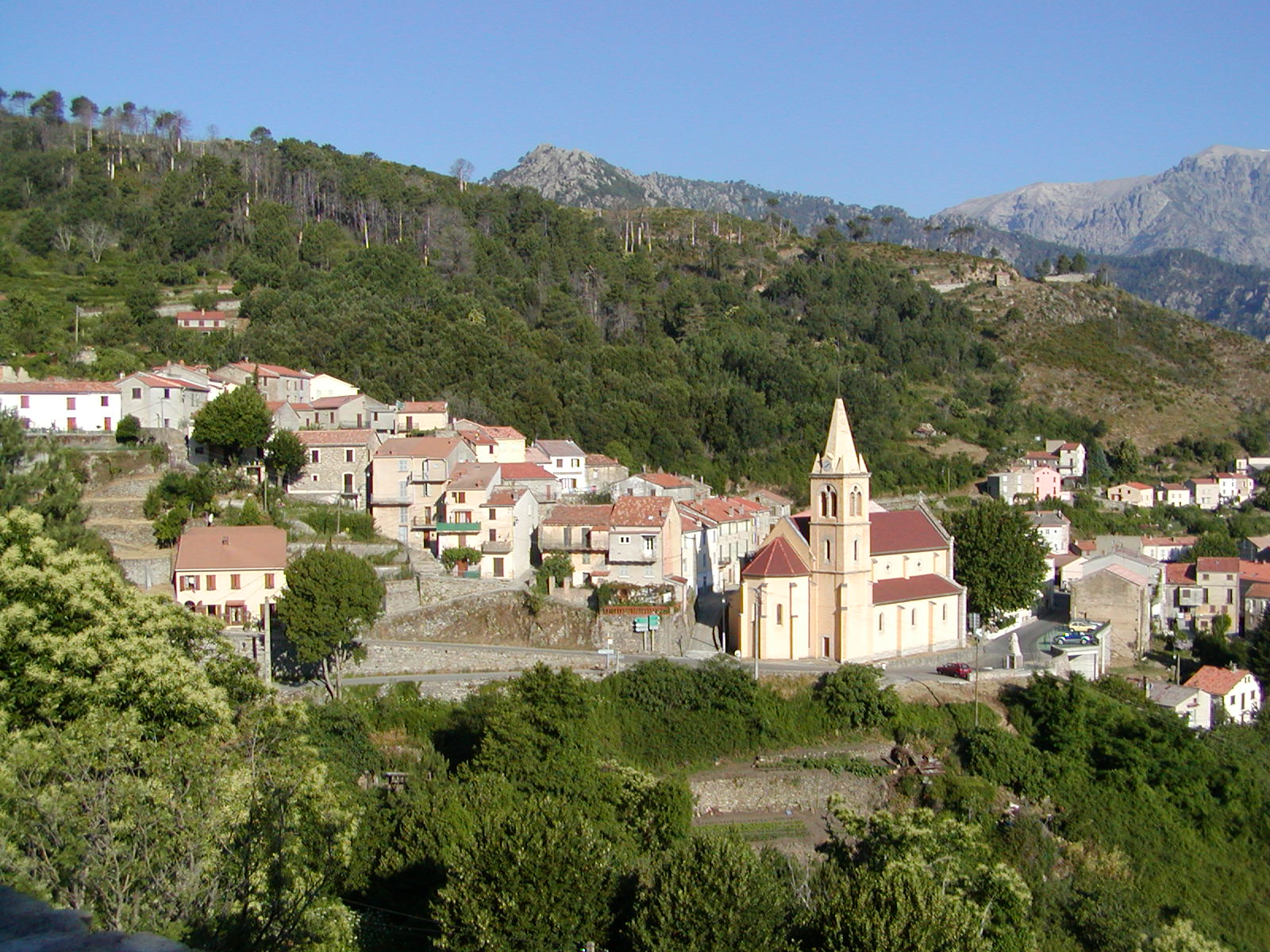
- The church of Saint Pierre-aux-liens and the surrounding buildings, in Vivario
- Location of Vivario
- Location within France Location within Corsica
- Coordinates: 42°10′19″N 9°10′13″E
- Country: France
- Region: Corsica
- Department: Haute-Corse
- Arrondissement: Corte
- Canton: Corte
- Intercommunality: Centre Corse

Government
  - Mayor (2020–2026): Venture Selvini
- Area^{1}: 85 km^{2} (33 sq mi)
- Elevation: 760 m (2,490 ft)
- Highest elevation: 2,390 m (7,840 ft)
- Lowest elevation: 400 m (1,300 ft)
- Population (2023): 409
  - Density: 4.8/km^{2} (12/sq mi)
- Time zone: UTC+01:00 (CET)
  - Summer (DST): UTC+02:00 (CEST)
- INSEE/Postal code: 2B354 /20219
- ^{1} French Land Register data, which excludes lakes, ponds, glaciers > 1 km^{2} (0.386 sq mi or 247 acres) and river estuaries.

Vivario (French pronunciation: [vivaʁjo]; Corsican: Vivariu) is a commune in the Haute-Corse department of France on the island of Corsica at the start of the climb to the Col de Vizzavona.

== Population ==
Historical population
Year	Pop.	±% p.a.
1968	603	—
1975	703	+2.22%
1982	624	−1.69%
1990	493	−2.90%
1999	509	+0.36%
2007	515	+0.15%
2012	498	−0.67%
2017	432	−2.80%
2023	409	−0.91%
Source: INSEE

== Transport ==
The commune is served by three stations on the Corsican Railways line between Corte and Ajaccio: Vivario, Tattone and Vizzavona.

== See also ==
- Communes of the Haute-Corse department
