= Monte d'Oro =

Mountain in Corsica

- Monte d'Oru
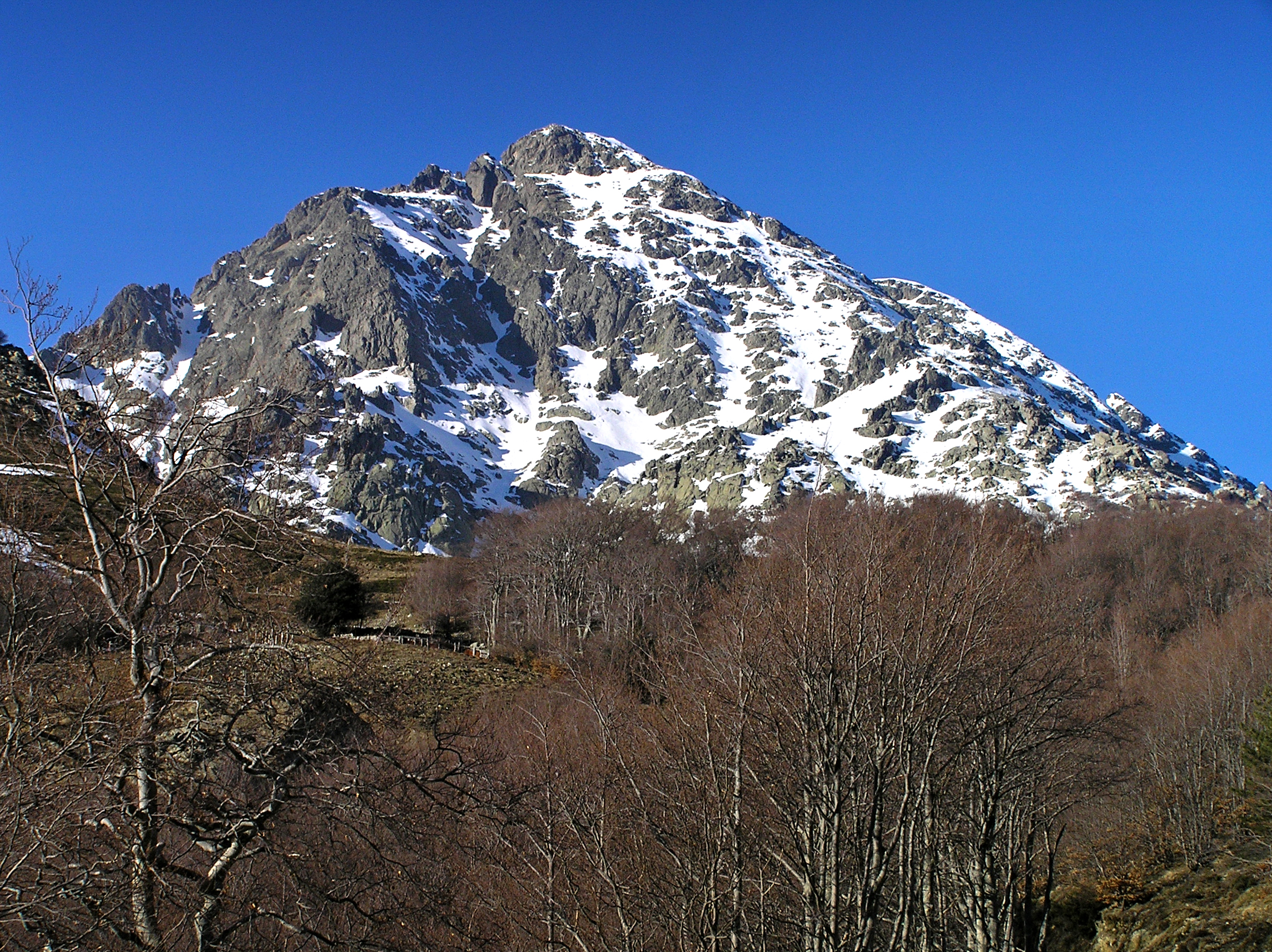
- Monte d'Oro from the climb to the Vizzavona pass

Highest point
- Prominence: 962 m (3,156 ft)
- Isolation: 8.64 km (5.37 mi)
- Coordinates: 42°08′15″N 09°05′55″E

Geography
- Location within Corsica
- Country: France
- Department: Haute-Corse

Monte d'Oro is a mountain in the department of Haute-Corse on the island of Corsica, France, one of the highest on the island. It is in the south of the Monte Rotondo Massif, but is sometimes considered the summit of its own massif, the Monte d'Oro massif.

== Location ==
Monte d'Oro is in the commune of Vivario in the west of Haute-Corse near the boundary with Corse-du-Sud. Lac d'Oro lies to the northwest. The Foret de Vizzavona is to the east and south of the mountain, and the village and railway station of Vizzavona Gare is to the southeast.

== Physical ==
Monte d'Oro has prominence of 962 metres (3,156 ft) and elevation of 2,389 metres (7,838 ft). It is isolated by 8.64 kilometres (5.37 mi) from A Maniccia-Crêt Sud, a sub-peak of the 2,496 metres (8,189 ft) A Maniccia. The conical mountain rises about 1,000 metres (3,300 ft) over the Col de Vizzavona road pass. From its peak, the view extends far over Corsica, blocked only by distant mountains such as Monte Rotondo to the north and Monte Renoso to the south.

The hike to the peak from the Col de Vazzavona is fairly challenging, including long and steep routes with an exposed ridge traverse, a hanging scree field and a climb through exposed ledges and chimneys. The weather can also be treacherous, with strong winds, heavy clouds and storms.

== Gallery ==
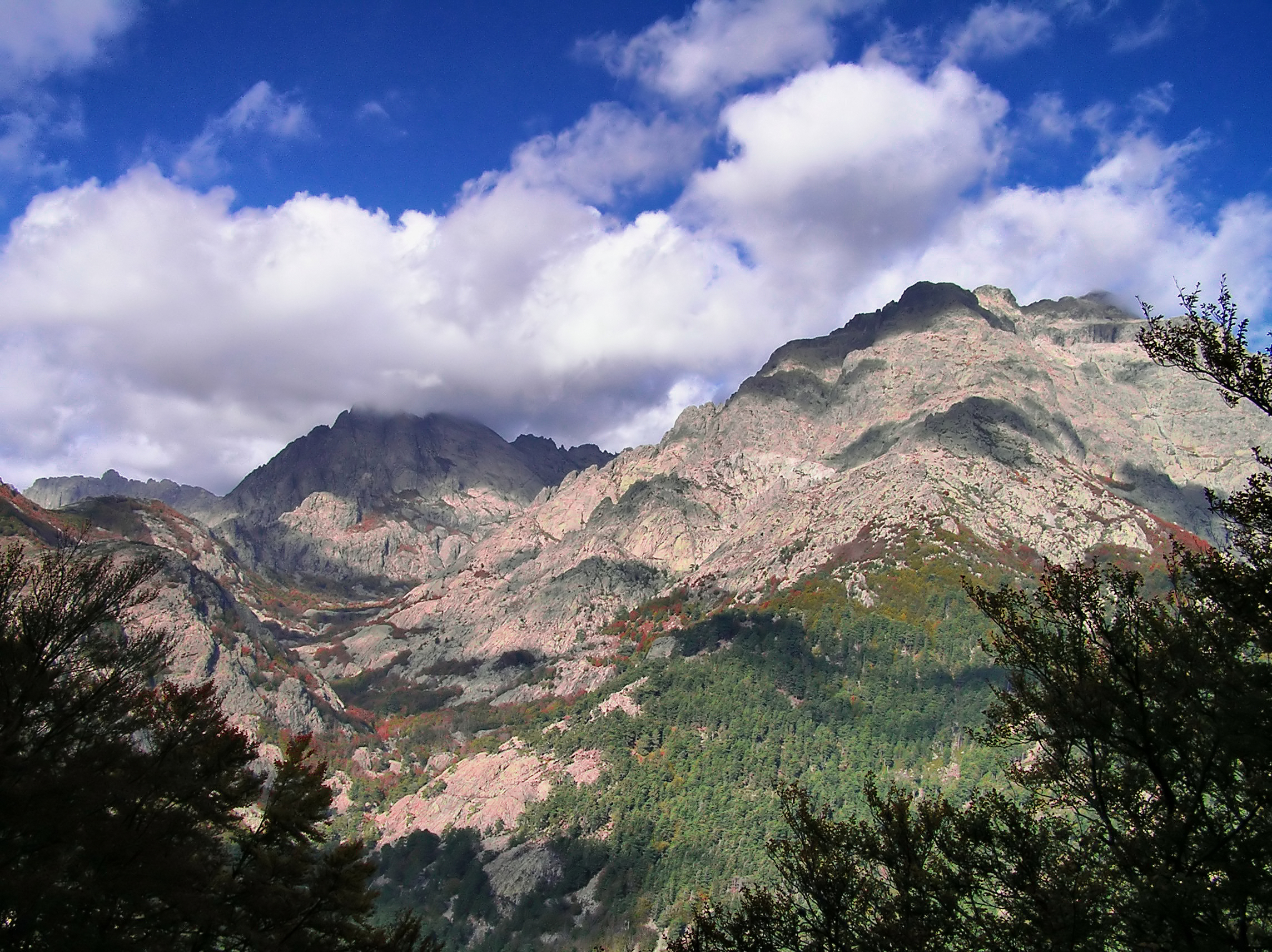
Monte d'Oro in good weather

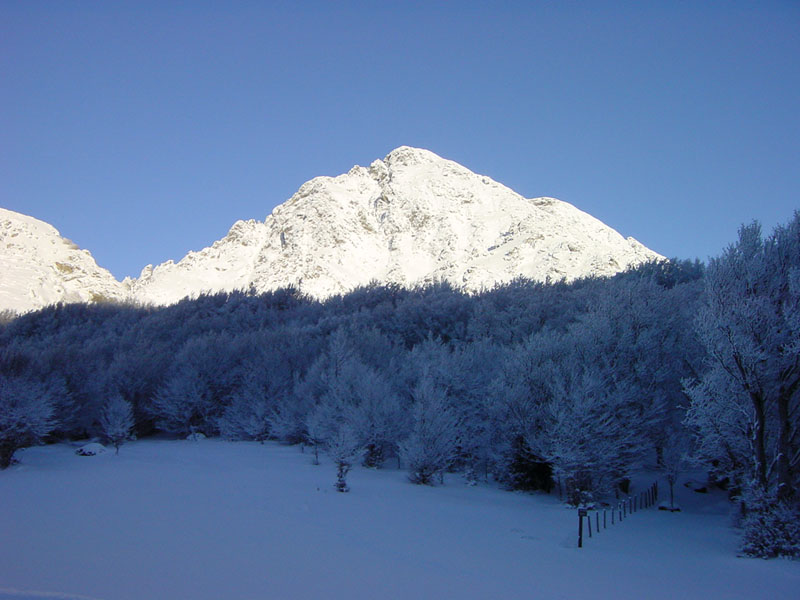
Monte d'Oro in winter

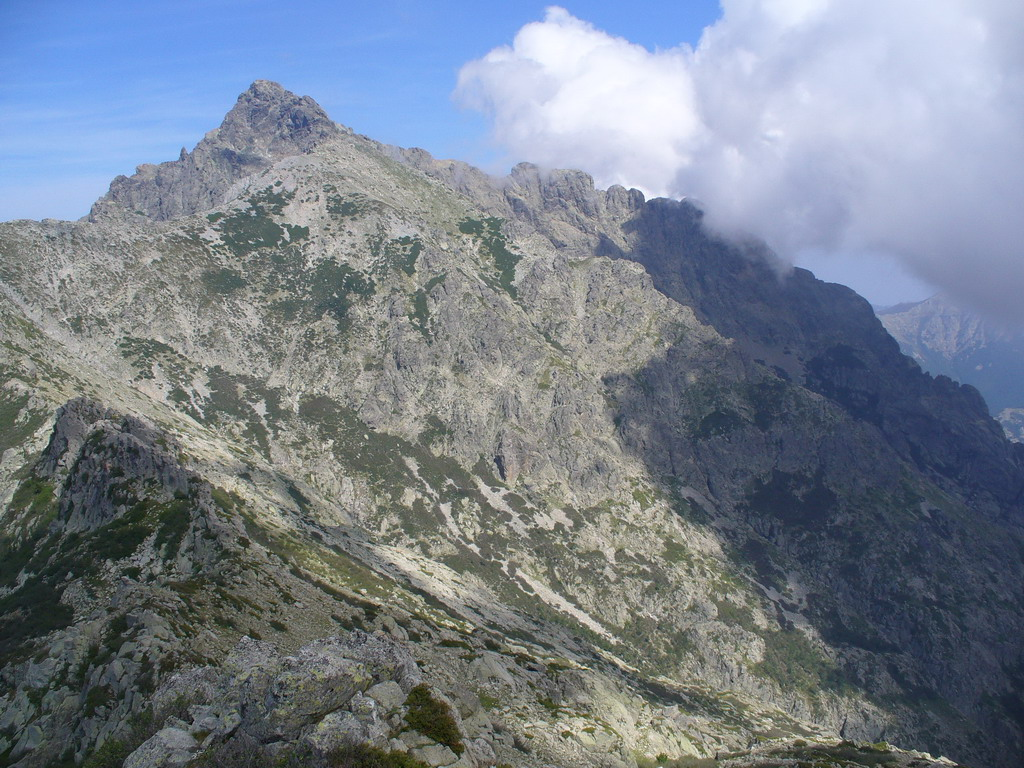
Monte d'Oro - Punta Muratello

== Sources ==
- Haub, Gangolf, "Monte d'Oro", Summitpost
- "Monte d'Oro, France", Peakbagger
- "Node: Monte d'Oro (6167018045)", OpenStreetMap
