= Monte Renoso Massif =

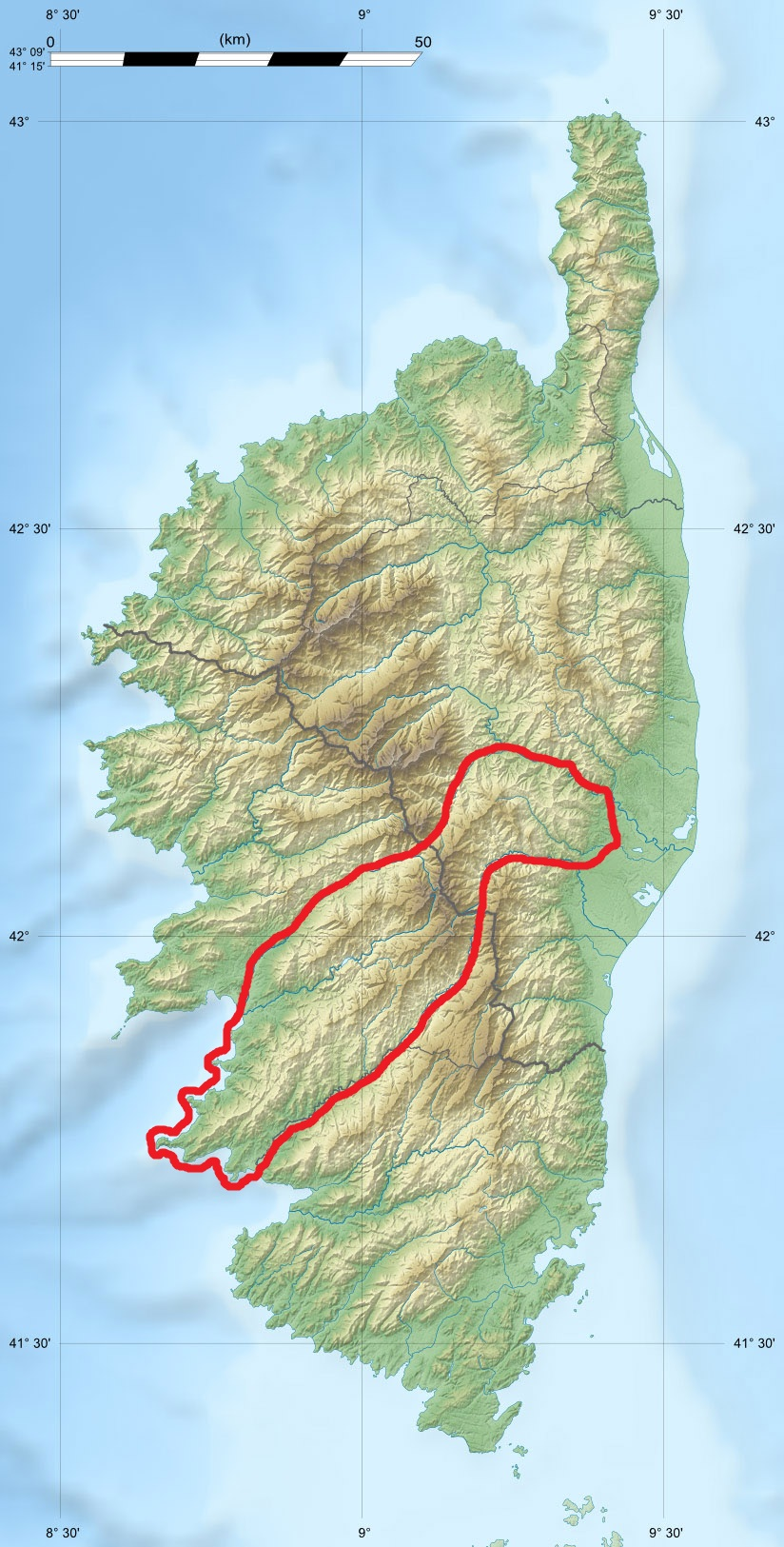

Highest point
- Peak: Monte Renoso
- Elevation: 2,352 m (7,717 ft)
- Coordinates: 42°03′30″N 9°08′01″E

Geography
- Location: Corsica, France

The Monte Renoso Massif (French: Massif du Monte Renoso) is a chain of mountains in the south of the island of Corsica, France. It takes its name from Monte Renoso, the highest peak.

== Geography ==
The Monte Renoso Massif is one of the four main massifs of mountains in Corsica. These are (from north to south), the Monte Cinto Massif, Monte Rotondo Massif, Monte Renoso Massif and Monte Incudine Massif. These massifs form the Corse cristalline, mainly composed of magmatic rocks such as granites, granulites, porphyries and rhyolites. The Monte Renoso Massif is lower and more open than the northern ones. It is bounded to the south by the Taravo river valley, to the west by the hillsides of Ajaccio country, and to the east by the Fium'Orbo.

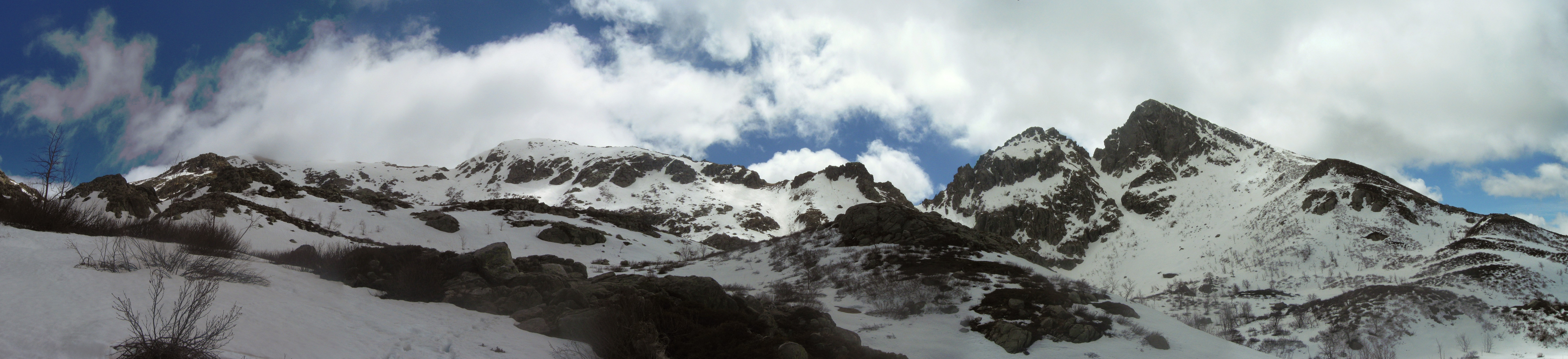
Panorama left to right: Punta alla Vetta, Punta Capanedda, Monte di Puzzolu, Monte Nieddu

== Peaks ==
The main peaks are,

Name	Elevation		Prominence	
Name	metres	feet	metres	feet
Monte Renoso	2,352	7,717	0	0
Punta Orlandino	2,273	7,457	0	0
Monte Torto	2,262	7,421	0	0
Punta alla Vetta	2,255	7,398	0	0
Punta Capannella	2,250	7,380	0	0
Punta Bacinello	2,247	7,372	0	0
Monte Niello	2,157	7,077	0	0
Punta Sfronditata	2,121	6,959	0	0
Punta dell'Oriente	2,111	6,926	0	0
Punta Scaldasole	2,100	6,900	0	0
Punta Piaggiola	2,014	6,608	0	0
Monte Giovanni	1,950	6,400	0	0
Punta Mantellucciu	1,679	5,509	0	0
Punta d'Isa	1,630	5,350	0	0
Punta Muro	1,565	5,135	0	0

== See also ==
- List of mountains in Corsica by height

== Sources ==
- Grande région écologique K Corse (PDF) (in French), IGN Agences de l'Eau, 2011
- "Massif du Monte Incudine en France", The Outsiders (in French)
