= Ghisoni =

- Commune
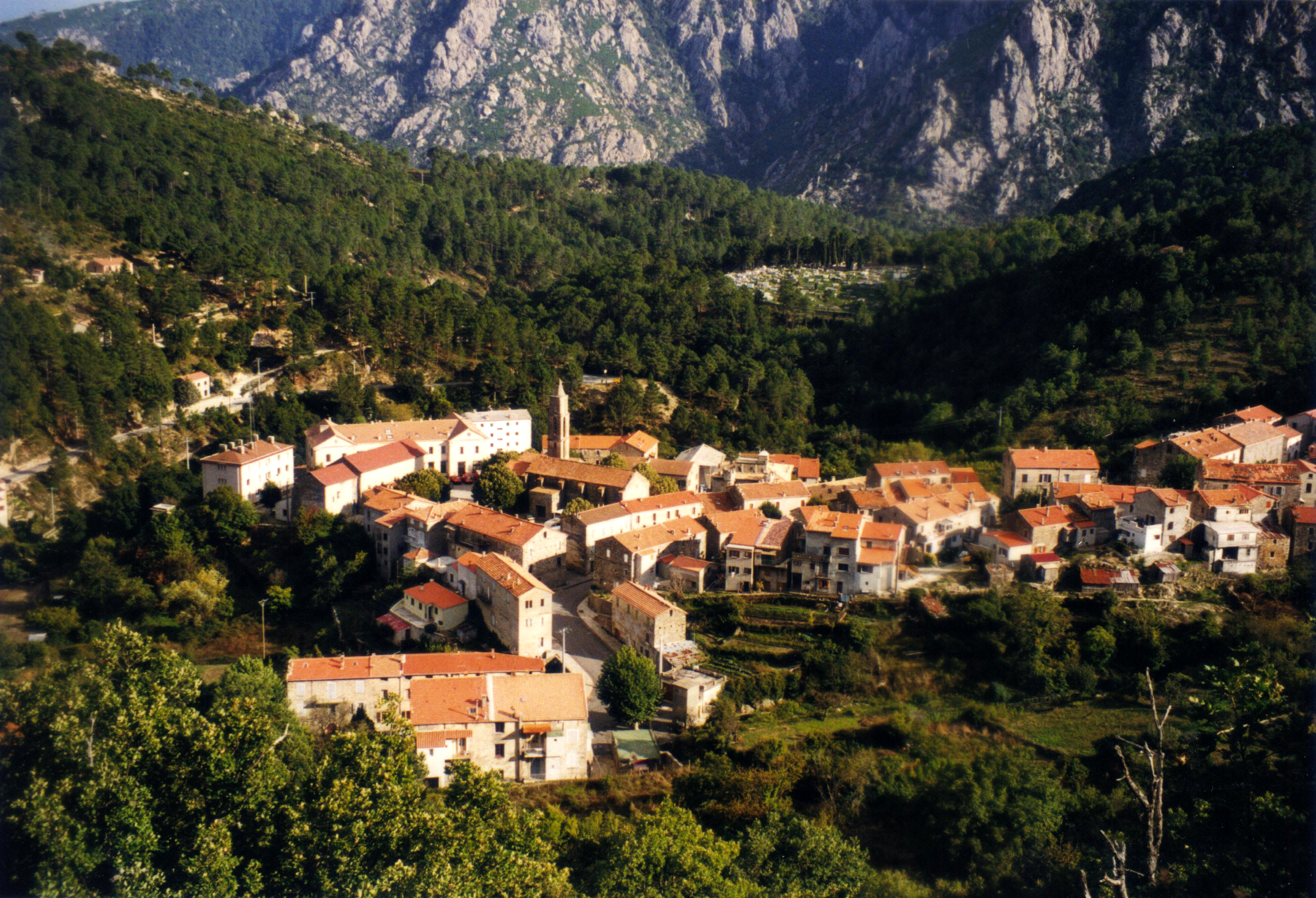
- A view of Ghisoni from the surrounding hillside
- Location of Ghisoni
- Location within France Location within Corsica
- Coordinates: 42°06′15″N 9°12′42″E
- Country: France
- Region: Corsica
- Department: Haute-Corse
- Arrondissement: Corte
- Canton: Fiumorbo-Castello

Government
  - Mayor (2020–2026): Don-Marc Albertini
- Area^{1}: 124.6 km^{2} (48.1 sq mi)
- Elevation: 650 m (2,130 ft)
- Highest elevation: 2,347 m (7,700 ft)
- Lowest elevation: 117 m (384 ft)
- Population (2023): 182
  - Density: 1.46/km^{2} (3.78/sq mi)
- Time zone: UTC+01:00 (CET)
  - Summer (DST): UTC+02:00 (CEST)
- INSEE/Postal code: 2B124 /20227
- ^{1} French Land Register data, which excludes lakes, ponds, glaciers > 1 km^{2} (0.386 sq mi or 247 acres) and river estuaries.

Ghisoni (French pronunciation: [ɡizoni]) is a commune in the Haute-Corse department of France on the island of Corsica.

== Population ==
Historical population
Year	Pop.	±% p.a.
1968	664	—
1975	397	−7.08%
1982	385	−0.44%
1990	335	−1.72%
1999	267	−2.49%
2007	229	−1.90%
2012	223	−0.53%
2017	212	−1.01%
2023	182	−2.51%
Source: INSEE

== See also ==
- Communes of the Haute-Corse department
