= 2026 in archaeology =

This page lists significant events in 2026 in archaeology.

== Excavations ==
- 30 March – 3 July; 3 August – 25 September: Excavation of the Roman fort of Vindolanda.
- July – Excavation of the Greek–Roman site of Parium in Turkey.

== Finds ==
=== January ===
- 3 – Discovery of a pristine medieval gold ring adorned with intricate filigree was announced in Tønsberg, Norway.
- 4 – Traces of human modification beneath dense tropical forest canopy in the Andean Chocó region of eastern Panama was revealed by using LIDAR technology.
- 6
  - A Byzantine-era monastic residential complex was unearthed in Al-Qarya bi-Al-Duweir, Sohag, Upper Egypt, revealing organised early Christian monastic life through well-planned mudbrick buildings, a central church, and Coptic-inscribed artefacts.
  - A late Roman mosaic floor featuring a central Solomon's knot motif was discovered in the ancient city of Smyrna, located beneath the modern city of İzmir, Turkey.
- 7– Norfolk Carnyx Hoard: Discovery of a near-complete bronze carnyx (war trumpet) together with a metal boar's head flag standard among a 2,000 year-old Iron Age hoard in West Norfolk, England in summer 2025 was announced.
- 9 – Discovery of a rare 5th-century BC stylus crafted from animal bone was announced during excavations at the ancient Greek site of Gela in Sicily, Italy.
- 11 – A rare 3,300-year-old faience funerary mask from the Dilmun civilisation was discovered at the Al-Hillah site in southern Bahrain.
- 15
  - Identification of Early Roman marching camps in Germania, providing evidence of Roman military advances into the region during the 3rd century CE.
  - Archaeologists announced the discovery of submerged remains at the El Huarco archaeological complex on Peru's central coast, indicating the site's ancient occupation and complex ritual landscape.
- 16 – New evidence for the intentional use of geothermal resources during the Neolithic period at Bagno dei Frati within the thermal complex of Terme di Sorano, Italy.
- 17 – Roman Republican-era tombs including inhumations accompanied by grave goods such as pottery, personal items and animal offerings were uncovered in Rome, Italy.
- 18 – Researchers from Sevastopol State University announced the discovery of medieval fortress site Isar near the village of Rodnoye in southwestern Crimea.
- 19
  - Ancient rock paintings on a sheltered rock face depicting geometric patterns, animal figures and abstract motifs were found near Kayseri, Turkey.
  - Remains of a Roman basilica dated to the late 1st century BC were unearthed during rescue excavations beneath Piazza Andrea Costa in the city of Fano, Italy.
- 20
  - A 5,000-year-old human skull bearing evidence of intentional cranial surgery was found at the prehistoric site of İkiztepe Höyüğü, Turkey.
  - A recent epigraphic study revealed the interpretation of previously unreadable inscriptions on ancient Roman wooden writing tablet fragments discovered in Tongeren (ancient Atuatuca), Belgium.
- 21 – A Roman cemetery associated with the Roman frontier with several hundred graves, including both inhumation and cremation burials was discovered near Brougham in northern England.
- 23 – A 1,400-year-old tomb from the Zapotec culture was discovered in the municipality of San Pablo Huitzo, Mexico.
- 24 – A bronze wheel cross dating to the 10th or 11th century AD was found in Havelland, Brandenburg, Germany.
- 26
  - Earliest evidence of 430,000 year old wooden tools was announced at the Marathousa 1 site in Greece's central Peloponnese.
  - A well-preserved Bronze Age hilltop settlement dating back to approximately 2400 BC was discovered at Harden Quarry in the Cheviot Hills, England.
- 27
  - A hidden sacred lake was discovered at the Karnak Temple Complex in Luxor, Egypt.
  - A bronze reliquary cross dating to between the 9th and 11th centuries AD was discovered in the ancient city of Lystra in Konya, Turkey.
- 29
  - High-status Bronze Age tombs with multiple interments accompanied by rich grave goods, including finely crafted gold and bronze jewellery and pottery were found at Hala Sultan Tekke in Cyprus.
  - A 5,000-year-old rock inscription in the southwestern Sinai Peninsula, one of the oldest known visual representations of political domination, was identified in Wadi Khamila, Egypt.
- 30
  - A medieval tunnel as a type of Erdstall within a Neolithic ditch enclosure was found near Reinstedt in Saxony-Anhalt, Germany.
  - 4th Class Cross of Military Merit of the Order of St. George was discovered from a forested area near Chełm, Poland.
- 31 – Avar-period archaeological complex including a well-preserved early Avar cemetery with graves containing women's gold and silver jewellery was found in Szeged, Hungary.

=== February ===
- 1 – Rediscovery of a lost metropolis on the Tigris River in modern-day Iraq, believed to be the ancient city of Alexandria on the Tigris was announced.
- 2 – Remnants of medieval Grimsby with a well-preserved stratigraphic layer protected by waterlogged, anaerobic soil conditions including fragments of leather shoes and aprons were discovered near the historical Flottergate area in England.
- 4
  - Several stone masonry foundations and paved surfaces belonging to residential and commercial quarters that were buried after the 1902 eruption of Mount Pelée under several meters of volcanic ash and pyroclastic surge deposits were discovered in Saint-Pierre, Martinique.
  - A 3rd-century AD Roman-era female terracotta head figure with a centrally parted, braided hairstyle was found at Magna Roman Fort, United Kingdom.
- 5 – A reanalysis of a 7,000-year-old roe deer antler headdress found in Eilsleben, Germany, was recently published, suggesting that Neolithic villagers at the site maintained significant cultural interactions with Mesolithic hunter-gatherers.
- 7 – A 4,000-year-old mural that provides data on the cosmological and religious frameworks of formative-period Andean societies was discovered at the Los Corrales site in Supe Valley, Peru.
- 9
  - Microscopic analysis re-identified a 5,300-year-old copper-alloy artifact from Predynastic Egypt as the oldest securely attested rotary metal drill in the Nile Valley.
  - A multi-year systematic excavation program featuring Bronze Age kurgans, a vast Muslim necropolis at the Khojaly Archaeological Complex was reported by the Institute of Archaeology and Anthropology of the Azerbaijan Academy of Sciences, Khojali, Azerbaijan.
  - LiDAR scanning and magnetic survey revealed that Gawroniec Hill in Poland was reshaped by human activity during the Neolithic period.
  - Researchers using tree-ring dating found the "Princess of Bagicz" was buried around 120 CE and her previous radiocarbon results were artificially aged by a "reservoir effect" caused by a diet of fish from carbon-rich waters.
- 11 – Excavations beneath the town hall square in Cologne, Germany, revealed Roman-era remains within the Praetorium complex, including a stone staircase dating to the late 1st century AD and a well-preserved 2nd-century lararium, or household shrine.
- 14 – The discovery of a high-status Early Bronze Age tomb with 31 flint arrowheads, two bronze daggers, and rock crystals was announced in Écouché-les-Vallées, Normandy.
- 13 – Aerial drone surveys revealed a previously unknown forum and theatre which is believed by some scholars to be Forum Aemilii, founded in the 2nd–1st century BC at the archaeological site of Fioccaglia, in the municipal territory of Flumeri, Avellino, Italy.
- 15 – The results of 3D scanning and petrographic analysis of Chalcolithic cornets (cone-shaped ceramic vessels) concluded that these vessels likely served as ritual lamps at the Jordanian site of Teleilat Ghassul.
- 16
  - A 2,000-year-old stone vessel workshop dating to the Second Temple period and containing hundreds of unfinished stone vessels, production waste, and fragments was found on the eastern slopes of Mount Scopus in Jerusalem.
  - The discovery of a petroglyph estimated to be between 4,000 and 8,000 years old likely linked to the cultural legacy of the Chaima and Kariña peoples was discovered in the Cedeño Municipality of Monagas, Venezuela.
  - A large cast-iron cannon dating to the late 17th to 18th century was discovered 1.5 meters underground at Queen's Gardens in Hull, England.
- 17 – 35 polychrome wooden panels dating to the 13th and 14th centuries were found beneath a private home in Toledo, Spain.
- 18 – A study revealed sophisticated stone-tool technologies, such as the Levallois method, developed gradually across Europe approximately 400,000 years ago during a warm interglacial period that facilitated cultural exchange and the emergence of early Neanderthal traits.
- 19
  - The discovery of Stolzenberg, a lost medieval town hidden beneath woodland near the settlement of Zagrody was confirmed in West Pomerania, Poland.
  - The discovery of the lost Ottonian royal palace with St. Radegund's Church, the Palatium, fortifications was announced in Helfta, located near Lutherstadt Eisleben, Germany.
  - A limestone structure was discovered featuring massive blocks inscribed with the cartouches of Pharaoh Apries and ceremonial scenes of the king performing rituals at the Tel Aziz site in Mit Rahina (ancient Memphis), Egypt.
- 20
  - Dozens of gold-enamelled terracotta artifacts, including intricate gold-glazed Bodhi leaf ornaments decorated with dragon motifs, were found at the Ho Dynasty Citadel, Vietnam.
  - An underground Byzantine-era network of chambers, corridors and cisterns was documented beneath Zeyrek Mosque in Istanbul, Turkey, revealing previously hidden subterranean structures.
- 21 – The completion of the excavation of a 1,200-year-old elite tomb was announced at the El Caño Archaeological Park in Coclé province, Panama.
- 22 – Rock-cut tombs dating to the Old Kingdom of Egypt were discovered at the Qubbet el-Hawa necropolis in Aswan, containing inscribed pottery vessels and funerary objects that were later reused in subsequent periods.
- 23
  - A Greek inscription discovered at the Great Mosque of Homs in Syria provided evidence for the location of the long-lost Temple of the Sun, once home to the solar cult of Roman emperor Elagabalus.
  - A massive two-kilometer-long geoglyph, a ceremonial temple, and a 100-hectare agricultural complex was found in Peru's Chicama Valley.
- 24 – 10,500-year-old fishing gear, including antler harpoons and hooks with sophisticated notched fastening systems, were found in Siberia.
- 25
  - The well-preserved 15th-century foundation walls of the Marienbrink Monastery church alongside a World War II air-raid shelter were found beneath the Brinkerhof quarter in Borken, Germany.
  - 2,000-year-old Roman lead ingots, which bear inscriptions dating to AD 87 and refer to Emperor Domitian, were found in Llangynfelyn, Ceredigion, West Wales.
  - A tomb plate belonging to a centurion of the First Italic Legion, which was inscribed with a verse about being 'pressed by fate' and later reused as building material for a subsequent burial, was found at the Roman military camp of Nove in Bulgaria.
- 26 – The traces of a medieval ferry crossing and an associated settlement were found near Rákóczifalva, Hungary, during excavations along the Tisza River.
- 27
  - A colossal Mexica offering dating to the reign of Motecuhzoma Ilhuicamina consisting of three stone chests filled with over 80 greenstone Mezcala-style figurines and 4,000 marine specimens were uncovered at the Templo Mayor, Mexico City.
  - The discovery of a preserved early medieval stronghold dating to the 10th to 13th centuries hidden within the dense marshes and woodland of the Włodawa Forest were found near Kaplonosy Kolonia in eastern Poland.
- 28
  - A joint mission of Egypt's Supreme Council of Antiquities and the Zahi Hawass Foundation announced the discovery of a cache of 22 painted wooden coffins of "Chanters of Amun," containing mummies and eight rare sealed papyri dating to the Third Intermediate Period, uncovered in the Tomb of Djeserkaraseneb (TT38) at Sheikh Abd el-Qurna in Luxor Governorate, Egypt.
  - Seven underground tunnel lines dating to the early Byzantine period, approximately 1,600 years ago, were documented beneath Hagia Sophia in Istanbul, Turkey, during restoration works.

=== March ===
- 1 – The discovery of a prehistoric human skeleton in a submerged cave system on the Yucatán Peninsula, which likely represents an 8,000-year-old burial site, was announced in Mexico.
- 10
  - Archaeologists used innovative imaging and carbon-14 analysis to achieve the first absolute dating of Paleolithic paintings in the Dordogne's Font-de-Gaume cave, revealing that a bison was depicted over 13,000 years ago.
  - The discovery of a 10,000-Year-Old Epipaleolithic site Şika Rika 5 in southeastern Turkey, near Mardin, provides early evidence of sedentary communities outside the Tigris Valley.
- 11
  - A joint Egyptian-German mission from the Supreme Council of Antiquities and University of Tübingen uncovered about 13,000 inscribed ostraca at Athribis in Sohag, documenting administrative and daily life activities spanning more than 1,000 years.
  - A study utilizing ancient DNA from North Sea sediment revealed the submerged landmass of Doggerland hosted temperate forests thousands of years earlier than previously believed, suggesting it was a prehistoric heartland rather than just a land bridge.
  - A submerged stone structure off Øygarden, Norway, identified as a medieval whale trap, provides the direct archaeological evidence of organized whaling practices previously known only from historical sources.
- 12
  - The discovery of charred hazelnut shells near Bodmin Moor provided radiocarbon evidence that hunter-gatherer communities were active in Cornwall as early as 8500 BC.
  - The discovery of Mesolithic burials dating back approximately 10,000 years that were marked by the placement of animal skulls on wooden stakes were announced in Schleswig-Holstein, Germany.
- 13 – A subterranean Cold War nuclear bunker buried on the grounds of Scarborough Castle was rediscovered.
- 16 – Archaeologists reconstructed a well-preserved Bronze Age warp-weighted loom from Cabezo Redondo, Spain, revealing that second-millennium BCE weavers used more technologically advanced textile production techniques than previously understood.
- 17
  - A radiocarbon study of 136 ancient organic weapons revealed the bow and arrow spread rapidly across western North America 1,400 years ago, nearly simultaneously replacing the atlatl in the south while coexisting with it in the north for centuries.
  - The ancient DNA study of Palau revealed its original settlers 3,000 years ago were already a genetically mixed population of East Asian and Papuan descent, a profile that has remained stable for nearly three millennia.
- 18 – A genomic study of the Southern Andes revealed ancient communities maintained strong genetic continuity and high-altitude adaptations for over a millennium, utilizing extensive trade and social networks to connect diverse environments long before the arrival of the Inca.
- 19
  - 15,000-year-old clay beads found in Israel contain the fingerprints of children and adults, suggesting that humans used clay for symbolic and social purposes thousands of years before the development of pottery or agriculture.
  - A fully intact cannonball likely dating to the 1836 Battle of the Alamo buried approximately one meter below ground near the Alamo Church was found at Alamo in San Antonio, Texas.
  - A nearly 6,000-year-old Neolithic wooden trackway was discovered at Honeygar in Somerset, England.
  - Headless stucco sculptures discovered at Tetlatlahuca in Mexico indicate destruction tied to political or ideological power shifts in Epiclassic Mesoamerican societies.
    - New archaeological research suggests prehistoric burnt mounds in Britain and Ireland were primarily used for hide tanning, resolving a long-standing debate over their function.
  - Submerged structures dating up to 2,400 years old were documented beneath the Dicle Dam reservoir in southeastern Turkey, revealing a partially preserved ancient settlement flooded in the late 20th century.
  - A 2,000-year-old Roman funerary monument with gladiatorial reliefs was uncovered near Appian Way in Apollosa, Italy, highlighting the social status and public identity of elites connected to gladiatorial games.
- 20
  - Three well-preserved 17th-century oak barrels in Skien, Norway were found revealing how slaked lime was stored and managed for early modern urban construction.
  - A well-preserved Roman funerary inscription was discovered after heavy rains in the Livorno, Italy.
- 21 – A study has identified Mazovia in central Poland as a major centre of large-scale iron production in pre-Roman Europe, dating back to at least the 4th century BCE.
- 23
  - The discovery of a 5th-century Coptic monastic building was announced at the Al Qalaye site in the Beheira Governorate, Egypt.
  - A Nordic Iron Age gold foil figure ("gullgubbe") depicting a couple was discovered on a farm in Rogaland, Norway, highlighting the ritual and elite cultural practices of early Scandinavian societies.
  - A large medieval funerary complex with over 200 graves was uncovered in Valence, France, revealing a previously unknown burial site centered around an early Christian structure.
- 25
  - During restoration work near the altar of St Peter and Paul Church in Maastricht (Netherlands), a skeleton consistent with accounts of French musketeer Charles de Batz de Castelmore d'Artagnan (killed in battle 1673) is found.
  - The discovery of the Melsonby Hoard, one of the largest Iron Age metalwork deposits in Britain, reveals new evidence of elite wealth, ritual practices, and the use of complex vehicles around 2,000 years ago.

=== April ===
- 2 – Researchers identified a 2,000-year-old papyrus fragment in Cairo, Egypt, containing previously unknown verses by Greek philosopher Empedocles.
- 3
  - The wreck of the Danish flagship Dannebroge, sunk during the 1801 Battle of Copenhagen, was discovered after 225 years in Copenhagen Harbour.
  - A large assemblage of over 500 Viking Age horse-related equipments was uncovered at a burial site in Sylta, Sweden.
  - The results of the geophysical and archaeological survey of the Hellenistic site of Iskandar Tepa in Uzbekistan are published.
- 4
  - A temporary Roman military camp with a range of artefacts including coins, arrowheads, and iron tent pegs discovered in southwestern Bulgaria is believed to date to 168 BCE and may be linked to Roman operations following the Battle of Pydna.
  - The remains of a German soldier who had suffered severe trauma, including skull injuries and fractures to the femur were found in a forest near Zdanów, Poland.
- 8 – A late 10th-century jewellery hoard was found in Veliky Novgorod, Russia, reflecting long-distance trade networks linking Scandinavia and Slavic regions in early medieval Europe.
- 14 – Bronze Age mining at the Great Orme, Wales, involved the use of specialized bone tools, demonstrating sophisticated and adaptable techniques for ore extraction and processing.
- 15
  - An early Maya ball court dating to 800–300 BCE was found near Poxilá in Yucatán, Mexico, representing a rare example of Middle Preclassic ceremonial architecture in the region.
  - Evidence of a Roman-period industrial complex was discovered at the Sizewell C site in Suffolk, England, indicating organised production activities, including pottery firing and salt production along the ancient coastline.
- 17
  - Archaeologists from Mexico's National Institute of Anthropology and History (INAH) announced the recovery of a significant stone sculpture depicting the maize god in San Damián Texoloc, Tlaxcala.
  - Underwater archaeologists in Yucatán documented a massive cache of over 150 firearms and a cannon in the Síis Já cenote, intentionally discarded during the 19th-century Caste War to keep them out of the hands of Maya rebels.
  - A long-term occupation site containing Neolithic domestic features, Bronze Age burials, an Iron Age metal hoard, and a fortified Roman-era enclosure was found in Sarzeau, Brittany.
- 18
  - A Roman-period tomb complex was discovered at Al-Bahnasa in Minya, Egypt, revealing multiple mummies adorned with gold foil and fitted with symbolic golden tongues, alongside limestone burial chambers and statues. A papyrus fragment discovered within one of the mummies contained lines from the Iliad, specifically from the "Catalogue of Ships".
  - A hoard of 1,700-year-old Roman "Vestland" bronze cauldrons was found in Schaalby, Germany.
- 19 – A systematic survey of Isla de los Estados in the South Atlantic uncovered a network of 19th-century logistics and penal sites.
- 20
  - A multi-phase structure, which appeared to have served as an astronomical observation point from the Caral period (c. 3000–1800 BC) featuring a standing stone and viewing platform, was discovered at Áspero, Peru.
  - The recovery of a significant cache of Neolithic rock crystals along the A66 route in Northern England revealed the existence of long-distance exchange networks and the ritual significance of rare minerals in early British communities.
- 21
  - Archaeologists excavating the Cova de San Xoán Vello near Ribadeo, Galicia, Spain, discovered the remains of a small, rectangular medieval chapel featuring a defined apse.
  - A hoard of Late Bronze Age bronze arm and leg rings, dating to 1300–1100 BC, was unearthed near Dresden, Germany.
- 22
  - A 2.2-meter-tall limestone statue fragment likely depicting the 19th Dynasty Pharaoh Ramesses II was discovered at the Tell el-Faraon site in the Nile Delta, Egypt.
  - Archaeologists at Kolona Hill in Aegina, Greece, discovered a collection of 17th-century BC gold jewelry, including pendants similar to those in the "Aegina Treasure," providing new evidence of the island's elite Middle Bronze Age craftsmanship.
- 23
  - Archaeological excavations along a Czech railway route in South Moravia uncovered a sequence of prehistoric and medieval remains, providing new data on long-term settlement patterns and domestic life in the region.
  - Archaeological and conservation work at Soknopaiou Nesos in Egypt's Fayyum region revealed new details about its Ptolemaic and Roman temple architecture and the community's reliance on a central processional route for religious life.
  - The discovery of a nearly 2-meter-tall white marble statue of the Greek goddess Athena was announced in the ancient city of Laodicea (modern-day Denizli, Turkey).
- 24
  - Archaeologists discovered a cache of dozens of stone cannonballs alongside medieval wall remains in Nieuwpoort, Belgium.
  - Archeometrist Dr. Armelle Charrié, et al. identified the Roman shipwreck Ilovik-ParŽine 1's (discovered in 2016) waterproof coating as several layers of multiple products such as pine tar and beeswax. Various pollen showed it had been applied at different times and different locations.
- 25
  - A diverse cache of ancient artifacts, including spiral armlets and iron greaves, was discovered by metal detectorists in a woodland near Spała, Poland.
  - The wreck of the USCGC Tampa (1912), sunk by torpedo during World War I, was discovered in the Bristol Channel by the British Gasperados Dive Team.

=== May ===
- 2 – Archaeological excavations in Moharam Bek, Alexandria, uncovered layers of urban history revealing new insights into the city's development across different historical periods, including tholoi and remains associated with the cults of Bacchus and Asclepius.
- 6 – DNA analysis from the University of Waterloo identified four additional crew members of Sir John Franklin’s 1845 Arctic expedition bringing the total number of genetically identified sailors to six.
- 13 – Archaeologists at the Hajar Al Sinanat site in Al-Khaboura, Oman documented a rock art site containing animal figures, human forms, and geometric carvings created using the rock-pecking technique.
- 19 – A giant stone vessel containing the remains of at least 37 individuals was found, providing information that some of the region's megalithic jars were used in multigenerational mortuary rituals between 890 and 1160 CE, at the Plain of Jars in Laos.
- 21
  - A 13th-century granite tombstone bearing a Latin cross within an early Christian cemetery associated with a wooden church dated to approximately 1140 CE was uncovered at the Śródmieście I site in Gdańsk, Poland.
  - Archaeologists at Castillo de Huarmey identified the first physical evidence of Peruvian hairless dogs at a Wari Empire site, where canine remains recovered from elite funerary contexts suggest the animals held social and ritual significance between 600 and 1050 CE.
- 22 – A funerary structure containing the remains of five individuals and ceremonial offerings, providing evidence for ritual and burial practices during the Late Horizon period, was discovered at Kuélap, Peru.
- 23
  - Archaeologists excavating the rediscovered Sanctuary of Apollo at Frangissa in Cyprus uncovered more than 20 votive statue bases preserved in their original positions, providing evidence for the arrangement and accumulation of religious offerings during the Archaic period.
  - An intact Greek terracotta theatrical mask dating to the 4th–3rd centuries BCE was uncovered in the Crno Jezero Cave on Croatia's Pelješac Peninsula, showing data for ritual activity at an Illyrian sanctuary and cultural interaction between Illyrian communities and the Greek world.
- 26 – A study of 8,839 ceramic fragments from the Roman city of Mellaria in present-day Spain revealed that the settlement functioned as a major mining center connected to extensive commercial networks across southern Hispania during the 1st and 2nd centuries CE.
- 27 – Archaeologists at the prehistoric settlement of Stăuceni-Holm, Romania, uncovered a 350 m² communal building dating to 4000–3900 BCE and associated with the Cucuteni–Trypillia culture, providing evidence of public architecture and collective activities in prehistoric southeastern Europe.
- 28
  - Archaeologists at the ancient settlement of Diriyah, Al-Qassim in Saudi Arabia uncovered a hoard of more than 100 Abbasid-era gold ornaments, gemstones, and silver objects dating to the 8th–9th centuries CE.
  - Archaeologists identified a 2,300-year-old cereal-based alcoholic beverage preserved inside a sealed bronze vessel from a Qin-period tomb, in Ningxia, China.
  - A hoard discovered near Urlați, Romania, containing three gold neck rings, iron wheel-shaped ornaments, bronze axes, and a bronze bracelet dating to approximately 1000 BCE, prompted researchers to reassess the transition between the Bronze Age and Iron Age because of the unusual combination of artifacts from different technological traditions.
- 29
  - A previously undocumented World War II mass grave containing the remains of 14 German soldiers, likely dating to the final months of the war was uncovered near Bolemin, western Poland.
  - A buried church bell measuring about 41 cm in height and 43 cm in diameter near a former Orthodox church was found in Hostynne, Poland.
  - The burial site of a high-status woman interred with jewelry, personal ornaments, and other grave goods was found providing evidence for social differentiation and elite female status during the Iron Age in Denmark, Ringsted Municipality.
- 30 – Researchers investigating medieval tombs at the Royal Monastery of Santa Maria de Pedralbes in Barcelona, Spain, confirmed the sepulchre of Queen Elisenda de Montcada contained her remains within a medieval wooden coffin and revealed evidence of an austere burial associated with monastic traditions.

=== June ===
- 5 – Remains of a Greco-Roman period settlement area with associated burial features was uncovered in Tell Kom Aziza, Beheira Governorate, Egypt.
- 11 – A study suggested that 5,000-year-old face-decorated pottery and battle axes from northern Europe reflected wider cultural developments across prehistoric Europe. The research links Danish face pots and Scandinavian stone axes with contemporary anthropomorphic art and prestige objects from western and central Europe, identifying early networks of cultural interaction along the Atlantic coast that preceded the spread of the Bell Beaker phenomenon.
- 12 – Over 1,200 petroglyphs, several funerary complexes, and a rare Old Turkic runic inscription were found in the Burkhansay Gorge, Kazakhstan.
- 13 – An 11th-century iron sword associated with the early Piast period was recovered from the Warta River near the town of Wronki, Poland.
- 17 – Researchers from Heidelberg University deciphered a 2nd-century CE Roman curse tablet discovered in Heerlen, the Netherlands, revealing a rare Greek-language binding spell in the Egyptian tradition that invoked deities and demons against named individuals.
- 25 – A rare 6th-century Assyrian stele was discovered by Iraqi archeologists and researchers from the University of Chicago near Nineveh's Shamash Gate. It detailed and celebrated the construction projects of Ashurbanipal. The stele has been described as providing evidence of the king's royal building campaigns, as well as the city's architectural and historical importance.
- 26 – Researchers deciphered an Aramaic inscription at the entrance of the Mithras Temple in Zerzevan Castle, Turkiye, indicating that the sanctuary was sealed by early Christians approximately 1,700 years ago following the spread of Christianity in the Roman Empire.

=== July ===
- 3 – Archaeologists uncovered a 4th-century Byzantine residential city at Dakhla Oasis, including the house of Tisous, a church deacon, the residence of Tabibos, a house church, along with Byzantine coins from the reign of Emperor Constantius II.
- 4 – Egyptian archaeologists uncovered 24 gold "tongue" funerary pieces, a gold Eye of Horus amulet, and a sealed granite sarcophagus at Marina El Alamein.
- 19 – Egyptian archaeologists uncovered three rock-cut tombs at the Bubasteion necropolis in Saqqara, containing hieroglyphic inscriptions and archaeological remains dating back to the New Kingdom period.
- 22 – Egyptian archaeologists uncovered a Late and Graeco-Roman funerary complex at the Tell Quesna Necropolis in Monufia, containing human burials, 560 faience ushabti figurines, protective amulets, imported Rhodian pottery, and evidence of Mediterranean trade.
- 23
  - Archaeologists excavating the Odeion within the Temple of Artemis complex at Ephesus in western Türkiye uncovered the carefully constructed Middle Byzantine burial of two newborn infants, possibly twins, inside an abandoned Roman latrine channel.
  - Archaeologists at the ancient Maya city of Calakmul in Mexico identified a Preclassic mural (c. 400–200 BCE) containing the earliest known evidence of Maya calendrical writing, including a day sign from the 260-day ritual calendar (Tzolk'in).
- 25 – Archaeologists excavating a Byzantine shipwreck off the Croatian island of Mljet recovered gold ceremonial belt fittings, imperial coins, and a gold signet ring dating to the late 7th or early 8th century CE.
- 30
  - Archaeologists in Veliky Novgorod, Russia, uncovered a rare 11th-century silver coin during excavations, providing evidence that coin circulation and commercial activity in the city began earlier than previously documented.
  - Two mammoth ivory bird figurines, each no larger than a thumbnail and dating to approximately 40,000 years ago, were revealed in Hohle Fels Cave in Germany.
- 31
  - Archaeologists at the medieval monastery of Selja in western Norway uncovered a previously unknown stone structure outside the monastery walls, revealing that the settlement extended beyond the known religious complex during the Middle Ages.
  - Archaeologists from the University of Warsaw studying the Tauchira Gate at the ancient Greek city of Ptolemais, Libya, decoded 626 stonemasons' marks, revealing new details about the gate's construction, funding and dating, and suggesting it was built during the reign of Ptolemy VIII in the second century BC.

=== August ===
- 5
  - Archaeologists uncovered a second-century building with mosaics and frescoes at Villa Celimontana near the Colosseum, which may have been part of the barracks of the Vigiles, the ancient Roman firefighting and night-watch force, including a mosaic depicting marine animals and a painted ceiling.
  - Drought conditions and record-low water levels in the Danube exposed more than 20 submerged shipwrecks near Prahovo, Serbia, belonging to a larger group of approximately 200 German vessels deliberately scuttled in 1944 during the retreat of German forces during World War II.
- 6 – Low water levels in the Danube also exposed parts of the foundations of Constantine's Bridge near Gigen, Bulgaria.
- 7
  - Exceptionally low water levels in the Danube near Budapest exposed World War II relics, including a German DKW NZ 350-1 motorcycle, the remains of two Wehrmacht soldiers, who were recovered and are to be reburied at the Budaörs war cemetery, and several anti-tank mines.
  - A 4th-century polychrome mosaic, an elaborate bathhouse with two plunge pools, and industrial buildings were uncovered in a Roman villa near Halberton and Sampford Peverell in Devon, England.
  - A Roman altar dedicated to Jupiter was found in the Danube River near Dunaújváros, Hungary.
  - A ritual well containing two bronze female figurines, a bronze plate, and the remains of two adults, dating the foundation deposits to the late 6th–early 5th centuries BCE, were found at the ancient Etruscan city of Kainua in northern Italy.
- 9 – A Roman shipwreck dating to the 1st or 2nd century BCE, carrying hundreds of well-preserved amphorae, was discovered about 46 metres (151 ft) underwater off the coast of Mazara del Vallo, Sicily, Italy.
- 10
  - A 2,400-year-old grave of a possible ancient wrestler, containing silver coins depicting wrestlers, was discovered at Aspendos, Turkey.
  - A vast fortified settlement, dubbed "Dev Kale" ("Giant Fortress"), covering approximately 120,000 square metres and enclosed by 1.4 kilometres of defensive walls was discovered near Mescitli, Muş Province, Turkey. Identified through satellite imagery, the site may date to the Early Iron Age and have links to the Kingdom of Urartu.
- 11
  - Three tombs dating to the Early Hellenistic and Galatian periods, around the late fourth and third centuries BCE, were discovered at Hattusa, Turkey, including a well-preserved burial with an intact skeleton and a knife.
  - A hidden hoard containing 49 one-kilogram gold bars and hundreds of gold coins, valued at approximately €9 million, was discovered during sewer construction beneath a former brewery owner's villa in Dendermonde, Belgium. The hoard, concealed beneath the cellar floor, included Victorian-era gold coins and numbered bullion bars, some reportedly dated to around 1957–1961.
  - An ancient Mamluk-era caravanserai was uncovered at 'Asila in North Sinai, Egypt, along the historic Sultan's Road, yielding pottery and architectural remains linked to pilgrims and merchants.
- 12 – Three ancient tombs dating to different periods of Egyptian history, including two believed to date to the Roman period, were discovered at the Sheikh Sobi archaeological site in the Bahariya Oasis, Egypt, containing mummies, limestone and pottery sarcophagi, pottery vessels, offering tables, and terracotta votive figurines.
- 15 – Archaeologists uncovered new remains at Tell Abu Saifi in Egypt's Qantara Sharq, including a massive temple enclosure, Ptolemaic and Roman roads, and inscriptions linking the site to Horus, Lord of the ancient city of Mesen.
- 21
  - A rare 13th-century seal identified as belonging to Byzantine Empress Irene Komnene was discovered at Perperikon in southern Bulgaria, offering evidence of diplomatic ties between the Empire of Nicaea and medieval Bulgaria.
  - The wreck of HMCS Spitfire, the first Australian-built naval ship, was discovered by divers off Cape York (Queensland) 128 years later to the day of her loss.
- 25 – A prehistoric circular 230-metre-wide structure with 12 entrances was found near Chleby in the Central Bohemian Region of the Czech Republic, dating to approximately 6,500 years ago.
- 29 – Archaeologists near Szandaszőlős, Hungary, identified the location of the medieval settlement of Nyénye through pottery, settlement remains, graves, and building rubble indicating a former village and church dating to the 15th–16th centuries.
- 31 – Gordonstoun School pupils uncovered a possible 10th–11th-century Viking church on Swona, Orkney, working with archaeologists from the Orkney Research Centre for Archaeology (ORCA).

=== September ===
- 4
  - A 9,000-year-old copper-working workshop dating to approximately 6900–6800 BCE, containing malachite, copper objects, and a stone-paved working area was uncovered at Çayönü Tepesi in Türkiye.
  - A Late Roman private bath complex built inside a corner tower of an early 4th-century imperial palace associated with Emperor Maximinus Daia, featuring three bathing pools, a steam room, and a preserved hypocaust heating system was found at the Vrelo–Šarkamen archaeological site in Serbia.
- 29 – A defensive system dating to approximately 4,000–3,500 years ago was found at the prehistoric site of Oued Beht in north-western Morocco. The system consisted of walls, ramparts and ditches built across a strategic ridge, representing the earliest confirmed large-scale defensive construction in North Africa outside the Nile Valley.

=== October ===
- 1 – Archaeologists from the Hungarian National Museum uncovered evidence of an extensive Late Bronze Age and Early Iron Age settlement on Somló Hill, western Hungary, with metalworking remains, ceramics, tools, weapons and numerous deposited metal hoards indicating a major centre of craft production and ritual activity.
- 2 – Underwater archaeologists excavating a 2,100-year-old shipwreck off Adrasan, Antalya in Turkey, recovered thousands of ceramic vessels representing 122 forms and sizes, including plates, bowls and trays produced at Rhosus (modern Arsuz), providing evidence for long-distance luxury tableware trade in the Mediterranean during the 1st century BCE.
- 3
  - A well-preserved 13th–14th-century hot-air heating system was uncovered beneath the former Gnadental Monastery, consisting of a heat-storage chamber, fire channel and eight openings that circulated warm air into the monastery’s refectory in Basel, Switzerland.
  - A 10,500-year-old aurochs skull impaled on a wooden stake, found near one of the oldest known graves at the Duvensee Moor in northern Germany and potentially associated with a Mesolithic burial ritual.
  - Archaeologists announced plans to investigate a possible pre-Hispanic ceremonial geoglyph in Argentina’s Cordillera del Tigre, Mendoza, at about 3,000 metres above sea level, consisting of interconnected circular and rectangular stone structures and passageways.
- 8
  - Archaeologists uncovered 131 cuneiform tablets and fragments, bringing the royal archive to 184 documents dating to approximately 3,400 years ago, during the reign of King Tudhaliya II.
  - A 3,000-year-old bronze sword from the submerged Bronze Age settlement was found in Lake Mezzano, Lazio, central Italy.
- 10 – Researchers identified hidden cavities beneath Grotta delle Veneri (Cave of Venuses) near Parabita, in Apulia, southern Italy. The anomalies may connect with the existing prehistoric cave system, which contains evidence of occupation by Neanderthals and anatomically modern humans.
- 11
  - Researchers analysing residential data from Mohenjo-daro found that economic inequality appears to have declined as the city developed between approximately 2500 and 2100 BCE.
  - Researchers studying prehistoric rock art at Tangbaletasi in the Altai Mountains of northwestern China identified multiple phases of artistic and religious activity, including Bronze Age human-like figures and later Tibetan Buddhist inscriptions and symbols, using hyperspectral imaging and comparative analysis.
- 14
  - Archaeologists announced the discovery of a shipwreck dating back approximately 4,400–4,700 years near Kekova Island, off the coast of Antalya, southern Turkey. Believed to be the world's oldest known shipwreck, the site contained ancient ceramic storage vessels known as amphorae, possibly originating from the Jordan Valley.
  - Archaeologists uncovered remains of two colossal statues, at least one depicting Ramesses II, in Behbeit El Hagar, Gharbia Governorate, Egypt.
- 30
  - An intact Roman-era child’s sarcophagus dating to the 2nd–3rd centuries CE was found in Constanța, Romania, near the ancient city of Tomis. The burial contained clay toys, including a wheeled horse and a rooster-shaped rattle that still produces a sound, as well as jewellery, protective pendants, a coin and floral remains.
  - Archaeologists from the Tamil Nadu State Department of Archaeology unearthed two 12th-century Chola-period bronze alloy statues depicting the Hindu deities Nataraja and Sivakami during excavations in Nagapattinam, Tamil Nadu, India. The statues, discovered approximately one metre below the ground, were found with their respective pedestals.

=== November ===
- 1 – Archaeologists used satellite radar imagery and electrical resistivity tomography to identify a previously undocumented structure beneath the ancient Egyptian city of Buto (Tell el-Fara’in) in the Nile Delta. Excavations revealed a structure dating to approximately 2,600 years ago, from the Saite period (26th Dynasty), containing mudbrick walls, an altar and religious objects, including amulets depicting Egyptian deities.
- 5
  - Earliest archaeological evidence of cannabis use for its psychoactive effects from the Tunnug 1 burial mound in the Uyuk River Valley, Republic of Tuva, southern Siberia, Russia. Six seeds were radiocarbon-dated to the early 8th century BCE.
  - Previously unrecorded features in tombs at the Etruscan necropolis of Monte Abatone in Cerveteri, near Rome, Italy. The investigation revealed throne-shaped seats carved directly into the volcanic tuff bedrock, surviving red-painted wall decoration and a preserved ceramic vessel decorated with engraved animal figures and red-painted details.
  - Discovery of eight carbonised loaves of bread dating to approximately 3000 BC at Seyitömer Mound in Kütahya Province, western Türkiye. The loaves were found beside an oven and collapsed shelving in a room that had been destroyed by fire, together with remains of wheat and lentils.
  - 280 Palaeolithic engravings were revealed inside Cova de la Font Major, a cave system at L'Espluga de Francolí in Catalonia, Spain. The assemblage includes 55 animal representations depicting horses, deer, bovids, caprines and a bear, alongside numerous abstract patterns and geometric designs. Radiocarbon dating of charcoal recovered from an engraved groove suggests that the artwork is approximately 26,000 years old.
  - Two elaborately decorated metal fittings from the moat surrounding the historic palace were uncovered at Pielaszkowice in Lower Silesia, Poland.
  - A fragment of an older Pictish carved stone and a separate carved human head during excavations around the Pictish monument known as Aberlemno III in Angus, Scotland. The stone fragment, found beneath the monument's base, bears part of an incised salmon motif and had been reused as packing material to support the monument.
- 6
  - Well-preserved wooden remains dating to approximately 10,500 years ago were found beneath Lake Arendsee in Saxony-Anhalt, Germany. Located around 20 metres below the lake's surface, the finds include a wooden post approximately 1.6 metres long, bearing traces of felling and shaping, and split wooden boards measuring up to 1.3 metres.
  - Evidence of iron production dating to the Golden Horde period was found at a medieval settlement in the Bayanaul district of Pavlodar Region, north-eastern Kazakhstan.
  - A small cast-gold figurine depicting a bear was found at the Karagaily burial mound in Almaty, Kazakhstan. The mound measures approximately 25–26 metres in diameter and 2.5 metres in height.
- 7 – Discovery of a Roman-period settlement and a jewellery-production workshop beneath a housing development was announced at Mancot, Flintshire, north-east Wales. Excavations recovered Roman brooches, lead moulds used to manufacture decorative fittings, pottery and coins, including examples dating to the reigns of Emperors Commodus and Constantine.
- 8
  - A fifth-century AD cemetery was found at Horbourg-Wihr, near Colmar in Alsace, north-eastern France. The funerary complex contained 14 human burials- 11 adults or older adolescents and three children as well as two horse burials.
  - Further sections of the Great Church of Jesus was uncoveredc at Old Dongola, the former capital of the medieval Christian kingdom of Makuria in northern Sudan. Excavations revealed a monumental staircase, buttresses supporting the cathedral’s apse and, for the first time, part of its original floor.
  - Archaeologists confirmed the existence of a previously unidentified Norse church at Qinngua, near Narsarsuaq in southern Greenland, following the discovery of a human skeleton in a nearby cemetery. The burial, positioned with the head facing east in accordance with Christian funerary practices.
- 9
  - Discovery of nearly 100 Acheulean stone hand axes in the Okwa Valley of the Kalahari Desert, Botswana. Approximately 40 tools were recovered from a single location, together with stone flakes and manufacturing debris that provide evidence of tool production.
  - Researchers proposed that a recently discovered Maya settlement in Campeche, Mexico, known to archaeologists as Minanbé, was originally called Sakil, a Maya word associated with whiteness. The interpretation is based on hieroglyphic inscriptions found on Stela 7 at Minanbé and a monument at nearby Ocomtún, whose ancient name was Maatz’.
  - Members of the Polish historical research association discovered a heavily deteriorated firearm and fragments of vehicle armour during a search in the area of Warlubie, Kuyavian-Pomeranian Voivodeship, Poland, associated with military events in 1945.
- 10
  - The first confirmed remains of the Sui Dynasty (AD 581–618) Great Wall were found in Beijing, at the Dalinggou early Great Wall garrison site in Changping District. The same archaeological programme also reported three wooden vessels dating to approximately 1,800 years ago, recovered from an ancient river channel in Fengtai District.
  - Archaeological excavations at Bala Hissar Fortress in Kabul, Afghanistan, revealed remains of Buddhist monastic buildings, ancient residential structures and a Mughal-period palace, providing evidence of more than 2,000 years of occupation.
- 11
  - Researchers reported that two megalithic collective tombs at the Trafalgar necropolis near Barbate, Cádiz, southern Spain, remained in use between approximately 1875 and 1625 BCE.
  - An assemblage of Roman-period belt fittings were found in Tsetsyn (Chechen) Forest near Chernivtsi, western Ukraine. The finds include a small square metal buckle, measuring approximately 2.1 cm and decorated with turquoise, blue and yellow enamel, an ornamental belt fitting and three circular metal objects.
  - A Roman-period limestone lion sculpture was removed from the archaeological site of Porta Barete in L’Aquila, central Italy, for conservation and restoration. First discovered during excavations in 2014, the incomplete sculpture is believed to have formed part of the monumental decoration of an ancient gateway that predated the surviving medieval Porta Barete.
  - Archaeologists excavating the ancient city of Pompeiopolis, near Taşköprü in Kastamonu Province, northern Türkiye, exposed approximately 120–130 square metres of a Roman floor mosaic inside a monumental basilica. Excavations also uncovered a sculpted head of Eros, the Greek god of love, dating to the second half of the 2nd century AD.
  - A well-preserved wall paintings and additional mosaic floor was uncovered at Huerta de Otero in Mérida, Spain. The paintings, dated to between the mid-1st and mid-2nd centuries AD, depict a lion pursuing a deer, a satyr accompanied by a woman, and various birds, including cranes, swans and peacocks.
  - A stone casting mould from Großeibstadt in Lower Franconia and an extensive bronze hoard were discovered near Grabenstätt in the Chiemgau region of Upper Bavaria.
- 12
  - Archaeologists identified a previously unlocated sanctuary dedicated to Asclepius, the ancient Greek god of medicine and healing, in the urban centre of Ancient Epidaurus, Greece.
  - Archaeologists excavated more than 100 Avar-period graves at the Vadverem/Odverem cemetery near Magyarlapád, Transylvania, Romania, close to the historic salt-mining area of Kisakna. Dating to the 7th–8th centuries CE, the burials contained horse remains and riding equipment, weapons, and personal ornaments, including pearl necklaces and earrings.
  - A Byzantine-period church decorated with colourful mosaic floors, an adjoining monastic complex, burial caves, columbaria and winepresses were found at Horvat Burgin (Horbat Burgin), within Adullam–France Park in the Judean Foothills, Israel.
  - Researchers identified 154 clay figurative artefacts from three Natufian sites in present-day Israel, el-Wad Terrace on Mount Carmel, Hayonim Terrace in Galilee and Eynan-Mallaha in the Upper Jordan Valley. Dating to approximately 15,000–11,650 years ago, the assemblage comprises 15 recognisable figurines and 139 cylindrical fragments interpreted as parts of figurative objects.
- 13
  - Archaeologists reported findings from Uruq al-Julaybah in the Mundafan region of southern Saudi Arabia, revealing evidence of human activity around 125,000 years ago, during the Last Interglacial period. The site contained more than 5,500 stone artefacts, animal fossils and plant remains, providing evidence of how early human populations hunted, processed plants and manufactured tools in the present-day Arabian Desert.
  - A study by researchers at Kiel University challenged the idea that the Rhine River formed a major cultural boundary in prehistoric Europe. Evidence from 5,000-year-old pottery, double-edged stone axes and collective burial monuments indicates that communities across France, Germany, Denmark, Scandinavia and Poland shared cultural traditions and maintained long-distance connections during the Late Neolithic period.
  - Five bronze vessels dating from the 3rd–5th centuries CE were presented publicly for the first time after their discovery near Schaalby, Schleswig-Holstein, northern Germany. The collection includes decorated bowls and cauldrons and a well-preserved bronze sieve.
  - Researchers re-examined three red-painted glyphs inside Cave 19 at Chalcatzingo, in Morelos, central Mexico, identifying them as examples of the writing system associated with the ancient city of Teotihuacan.
  - Archaeologists excavating the Grønhaug Viking ship burial on the island of Karmøy, Rogaland, western Norway, uncovered a stone cairn beneath the Viking Age grave, which may represent an earlier Bronze Age burial mound. The structure consists of a man-made stone core covered with layers of soil and turf, with large stones forming a kerb around its base.
- 14
  - A collection of Viking Age artefacts dating to approximately 900 CE was discovered on the Isle of Man by metal detectorists. The assemblage includes three bronze brooches, an elaborately decorated sword, trading weights, fragments of balance scales, a bronze ladle and an axehead.
  - Aerial photographs revealed a series of previously undocumented interlocking stone circles in the Hali area of Al-Qunfudhah Governorate, southwestern Saudi Arabia. Constructed from locally available volcanic stone, the formations create overlapping geometric patterns of different sizes.
- 16 – Archaeologists discovered an intact, unused Neolithic greenstone axe inside a cave at the Terme di Sorano thermal springs, in Grosseto province, Tuscany, Italy. Microscopic analysis identified the stone as eclogite, probably originating in the western Alps, hundreds of kilometres away.
- 17 – Archaeologists identified the stone foundations of an octagonal structure at the Ōsato archaeological site on Kuroshima Island, in Kagoshima Prefecture, southwestern Japan. The structure, believed to date to approximately the 12th century, measures about 8.9 metres across its upper section, with a wider lower foundation estimated at 10–11 metres.
- 18 – A study published in the journal Antiquity challenged the long-standing interpretation that the Anglo-Saxon kingdom of Northumbria abandoned silver coinage during the ninth century because of economic decline and Viking raids.
- 19
  - A hoard of more than 200 Celtic silver coins, weighing over two kilograms was found during excavations at Szombathely, western Hungary. The coins are Velem-type tetradrachms dating from the late second to early first century BC and were found in a shallow pit, some apparently deposited inside a small container.
  - Discovery of an Anglo-Saxon burial at Sutton Hoo, Suffolk, England. The grave contained goods like beads, tweezers, a knife and a brooch.
- 20
  - 113 ancient tombs, 622 inscribed bamboo and wooden slips including one of China's earliest known inventories of military equipment, recording soldiers, weapons, supplies and defensive installations were revealed at the Laohudun cemetery in Yunmeng County, Hubei Province, China. The excavation also produced more than 600 lacquered wooden objects, painted coffins, silk fragments and preserved human brain tissue from one burial.
  - A Roman-period pagan temple that remained in religious use until approximately the middle of the fifth century AD was uncovered near Ivaylovgrad, in southern Bulgaria. Founded in the third century, the sanctuary measures around 15 metres in length and consists of three interconnected rooms containing an altar, a sacrificial area and a space for storing offerings.

== Events ==
=== March ===
- 5 – The book "Çovdar nekropolu", documenting excavations of a Late Bronze–Early Iron Age burial site in Dashkasan with over 150 graves and thousands of artefacts, was officially presented to the public.

=== April ===
- 25 – 144 gold coins coined between 1772 and 1822 from the Treasure of Villanueva in the Museo Arqueológico Provincial of Badajoz (Spain) are stolen.

=== July ===
- 7 – France returned 23 Syrian archaeological artefacts that had remained at the Arab World Institute in Paris for approximately 15 years. The collection, originally loaned by Syrian museums, included Roman bronzes, Byzantine and Islamic-era objects, and a mosaic panel from the Umayyad Mosque in Damascus.

=== August ===
- 27 – The Treasure of Villena is stolen in a smash-and-grab heist from Villena Museum (Spain) where they were on display to the public. The Villena thieves left behind a bracelet of meteor iron, a rare piece for archeology but worthless as raw material.

=== September ===
- 22 - The Discovery of the Wesseling Hoard, the largest Hadrianic coin cache in Germany, was announced, with the coins on public display at the Rheinisches Landesmuseum Bonn.
- 23 – The United States returned 36 looted ancient artefacts to Syria, valued at more than US$5 million, including a Roman-era funerary relief from Palmyra, ancient mosaics, and three Syro-Hittite female figurines. The artefacts were recovered following investigations by the Manhattan District Attorney's Office and formally handed over in New York.

== Deaths ==
- January 4: Jitamitra Prasad Singh Deo, Indian historian and archaeologist (b. 1946)
- January 11: Gabriel Barkay, Israeli archaeologist (b. 1944)
- January 11: Bennie Carlton Keel, American archaeologist (b. 1934)
- January 15: George Speake, British art historian and archaeologist
- January 17: Ann Ashmead, American archaeologist (b. 1929)
- April 4: Paola Pelagatti, Italian archaeologist (b. 1926)
- April 13: Annetta Alexandridis, German archaeologist (b. 1968)
- April 18: Lynne Goldstein, American archaeologist (b. 1953)
- April 30: Pirkko-Liisa Lehtosalo-Hilander, Finnish archaeologist (b. 1934)
- May 5: Val Attenbrow, Australian archaeologist (b. 1942)
- May 8: Anna Ritchie, British archaeologist of Orkney (b. 1943)
- May 25: Shereen Ratnagar, Indian archaeologist (b. 1944)
- June 1: Ermanno Arslan, Italian archaeologist (b. 1940)
- June 11: María Ángeles Mezquíriz Irujo, Spanish archaeologist (b. 1929)
- July 19: Venceslas Kruta, French archaeologist (b. 1939)
- July 19: Esmaeil Yaghmaei, Iranian archaeologist (b. 1941)
- July 23: Clemente Marconi, Italian-American archaeologist (b. 1966)
- July 26: Isabel McBryde, Australian archaeologist (b. 1934)
- August 5: Oleksii Yukov, Ukrainian war archaeologist (b. 1985)
- August 18: Jean-Louis Brunaux, French archaeologist (b. 1953)
- September 6: Rosa Fung Pineda, Peruvian archaeologist

== See also ==
- List of years in archaeology
