= Bastelicaccia =

Commune in Corsica, France

- Commune
- Location of Bastelicaccia
- Location within France Location within Corsica
- Coordinates: 41°55′23″N 8°49′45″E
- Country: France
- Region: Corsica
- Department: Corse-du-Sud
- Arrondissement: Ajaccio
- Canton: Ajaccio-5
- Intercommunality: Celavu-Prunelli

Government
  - Mayor (2020–2026): Antoine Ottavi
- Area^{1}: 18.21 km^{2} (7.03 sq mi)
- Elevation: 30 m (98 ft)
- Highest elevation: 888 m (2,913 ft)
- Lowest elevation: 7 m (23 ft)
- Population (2023): 4,411
  - Density: 242.2/km^{2} (627.4/sq mi)
- Time zone: UTC+01:00 (CET)
  - Summer (DST): UTC+02:00 (CEST)
- INSEE/Postal code: 2A032 /20129
- ^{1} French Land Register data, which excludes lakes, ponds, glaciers > 1 km^{2} (0.386 sq mi or 247 acres) and river estuaries.

Bastelicaccia (French pronunciation: [bastelikatʃ(j)a]; Corsican: A Bastirgaccia) is a commune in the Corse-du-Sud department of France on the island of Corsica.

The inhabitants of the commune are known as Bastilcacci or Bastelicacciais and Bastelicacciaises.

== Geography ==
Bastelicaccia is 11 kilometres (7 mi) to the east of the centre of Ajaccio and immediately to the east of Ajaccio Napoleon Bonaparte Airport. It was created in 1865 between the rivers Gravona and Prunelli. The highest point in the commune is Monte Aragnasco. Access to the commune is by Route nationale N196 which passes through the south of the commune from the airport in the west to Cauro in the east. The D3 branches off the N196 at the south-western edge of the commune and goes north-east through the commune to Ocana. Access to the village is by the D303 which branches from the D3 in the commune and goes north to the village then continues north to join the D1 west of Cuttoli-Corticchiato. Apart from the main village there are the villages of Colombina, Macina, Bottacina, Cagile, Casaccia, Mascarone, Cuara, Funtanacciu, Mascardaccia, Suaralta, Forcala, and Pisciatello. The commune is hilly with many villages, farms, and some forests.

One of the traditional cheeses of Corsica is called bastelicacciu after the commune. It is produced in the lower valleys of the Gravona and Prunelli.

== History ==
On the 18th century land survey Bastelicaccia was better known as Bastélica-Communes. It became populated from the beginning of the 19th century.

With a land area of 1820 hectares, the population of about 800 in Bastelica village considered that it was easier to settle in the plains for most farmers as the lowland climate was better in winter. So, in summer, there would be an annual migration back to Bastelica village. As a result, the Chief Surveyor advised the creation of the commune of Bastelicaccia.

Bastelicaccia is part of the Canton of Ajaccio-5. The Canton also includes Alata, Villanova and part of Ajaccio.

Bastelicaccia has evolved at a rapid pace due to the proximity of the regional capital and its urban sprawl.

== Administration ==
List of Successive Mayors

From	To	Name	Party
	1866	M. Seta	
1866	1870	Joseph Benielli	
1871	1871	François Porri	
1871	1876	Jean-Pierre Frassati	
1876	1878	Innocent Valle	
1878	1900	Dominique Valle	
1900	1908	Jean-Toussaint Ottavi	
1908	1919	Baptiste Paoletti	
1925	1930	Vincent Vincenti	
1930	1935	Joseph Vincenti	
1935	1959	Henri Antonetti	
1959	1977	Pierre Benielli	
1977	1995	Augustin Gambarelli	
2001	2026	Antoine Ottavi	DVG

== Demography ==
Historical population

Year	Pop.	±% p.a.
1866	418	—
1872	200	−11.56%
1876	514	+26.61%
1881	506	−0.31%
1886	535	+1.12%
1891	570	+1.28%
1896	750	+5.64%
1901	769	+0.50%
1906	843	+1.85%
1911	783	−1.47%
1921	715	−0.90%
1926	718	+0.08%
1931	729	+0.30%

Year	Pop.	±% p.a.
1936	753	+0.65%
1946	789	+0.47%
1954	677	−1.90%
1962	705	+0.51%
1968	779	+1.68%
1975	887	+1.87%
1982	1,504	+7.84%
1990	2,072	+4.09%
1999	2,769	+3.27%
2007	3,185	+1.76%
2012	3,518	+2.01%
2017	3,983	+2.51%
2023	4,411	+1.72%

Source: EHESS and INSEE

== Culture and heritage ==
=== Civil heritage ===
The commune has a very large number of houses that are registered as historical monuments. As well as the houses the commune also has a number of other sites that are registered as historical monuments:

- A Bread Oven at Cagili (18th century)
- The Prunelli Inn at Pisciatella (19th century)
- The old Primary School at Fontanaccio (1882)
- The old Primary School at Pedocchio (1882)

=== Religious heritage ===
The Church of Saint Michel (19th century) is registered as an historical monument. The Church contains a Statue: Christ on the Cross (18th century) which is registered as an historical object.

== See also ==
- Communes of the Corse-du-Sud department
