= Pelagatti =

Pelagatti is a surname. Notable eople with the surname include:

- Carlo Pelagatti
- Paola Pelagatti
