= Cabezo Redondo treasure =

Archaeological treasure trove found in 1963

- Tesorillo del Cabezo Redondo
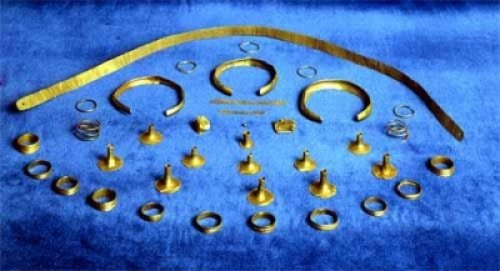
- The Tesorillo del Cabezo Redondo collection.
- Material: Gold
- Weight: 150 g
- Created: 30th century BC
- Discovered: 1963
- Discovered by: José María Soler
- Present location: Archaeological Museum of Villena
- Culture: Bronze Age

The Tesorillo del Cabezo Redondo is a gold hoard discovered in the spring of 1963 at Cabezo Redondo, an Argaric culture settlement located 2 km from the city of Villena (Alicante).

It consists of 35 pieces of personal adornment, including a diadem, rings, bracelets, pendants, beads from a necklace, spirals, bands, and a small gold ingot, totaling 150 g in weight. It is believed that these items belonged to a goldsmith, as suggested by the presence of the ingot. There has been significant speculation regarding its close relationship with the Treasure of Villena.
