= Cabezo Redondo =

Bronze Age site in Alicante, Spain

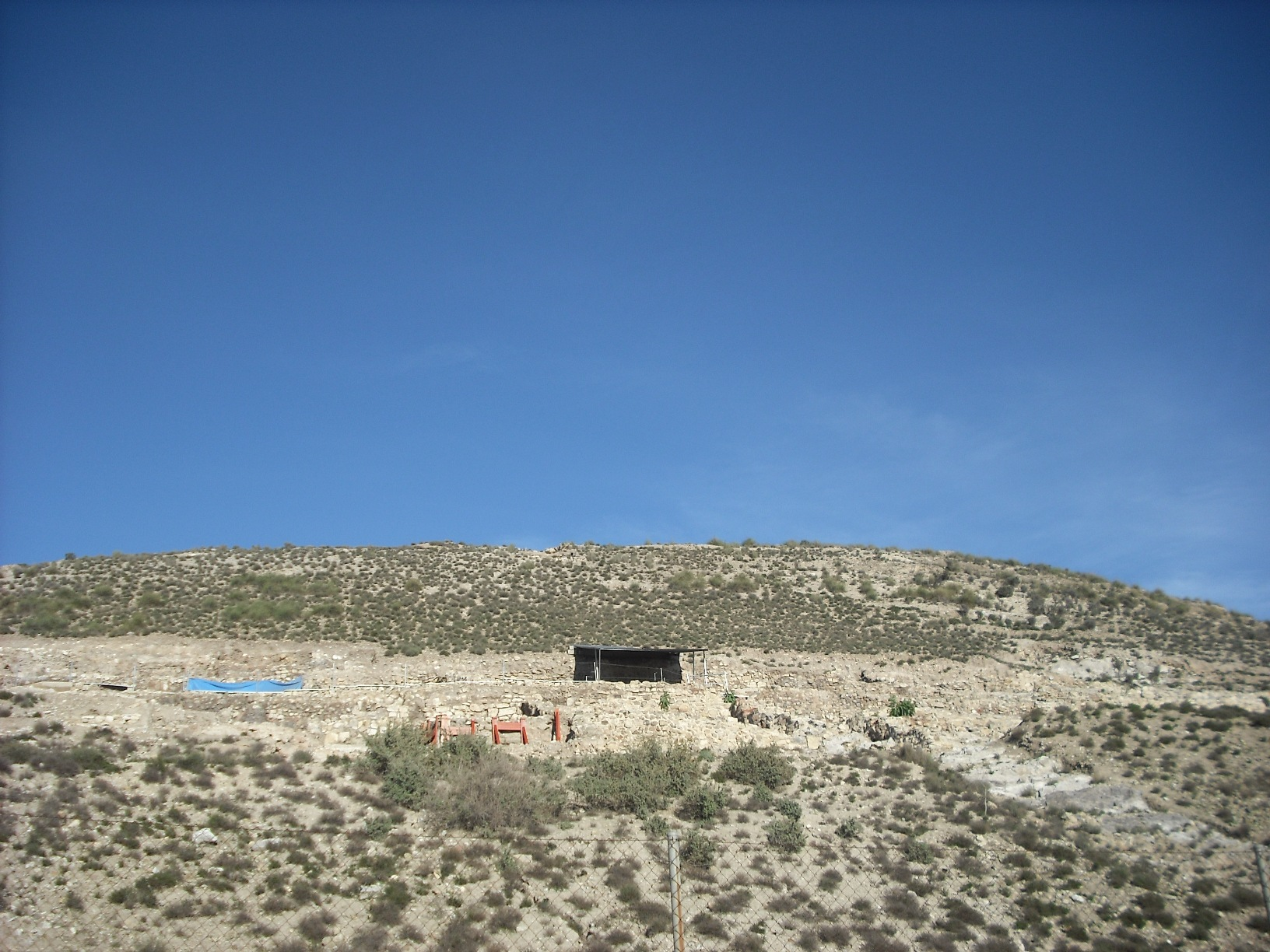
- View of excavations
- Interactive map of Cabezo Redondo
- Type: Settlement and necropolis
- Periods: Bronze Age
- Cultures: Argaric culture
- Region: Alicante, Spain

History
- Built: 16th century BC
- Abandoned: 12th century BC
- Archaeologists: José María Soler García, Mauro S. Hernández Pérez
- Discovered: Juan Vilanova i Piera (1870)

Site notes
- Material: Cabezo Redondo treasure Bronze Age Loom

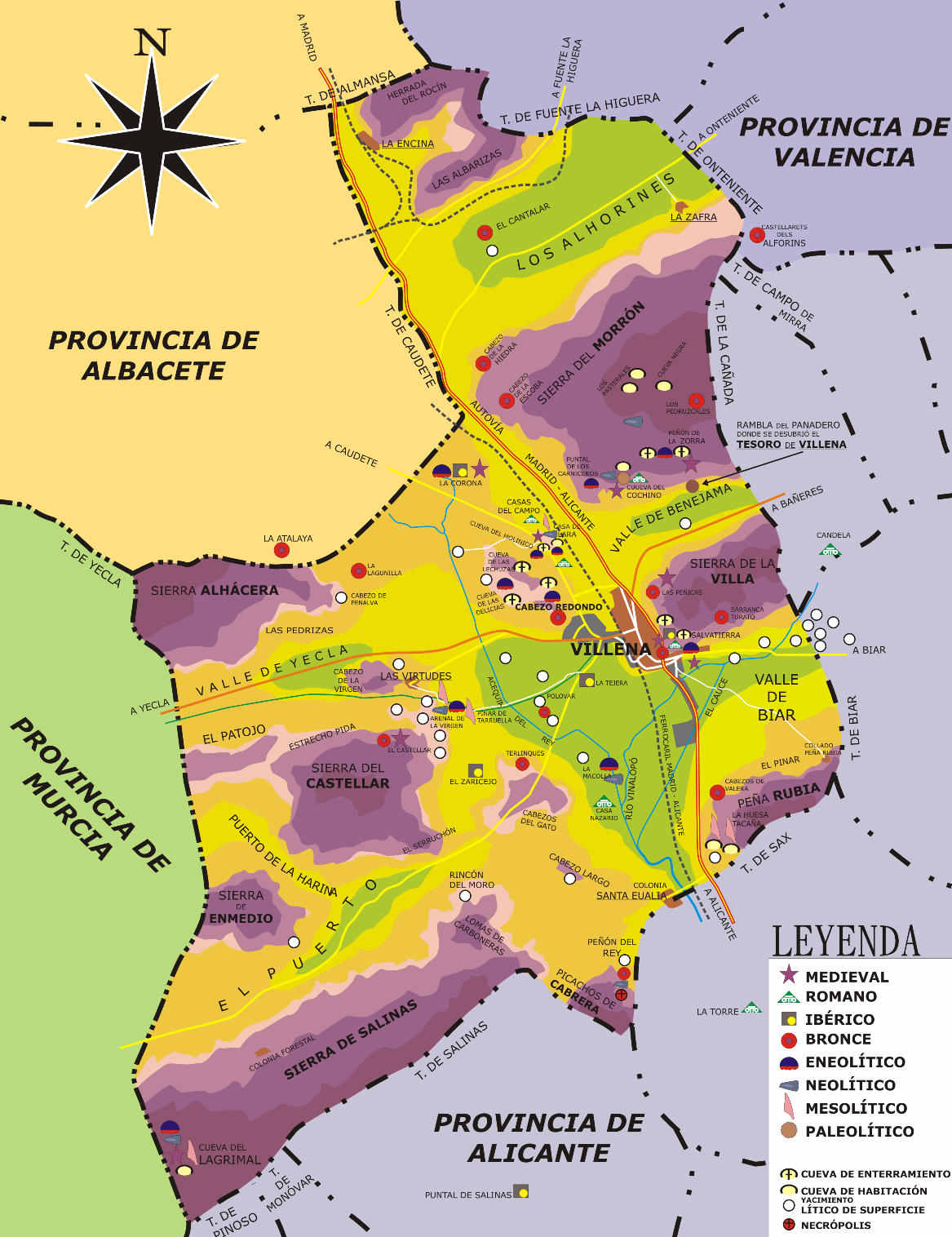
Archaeological remains found in the Villena region.

Cabezo Redondo is a Bronze Age archaeological site located on a hill 2 km from Villena, Alicante. It was not a mere village but a true regional center inhabited between 1500 and 1100 BC, likely belonging to the Argaric culture. It is speculated that the first investigations were conducted by Juan Vilanova i Piera around 1870, although it was the archaeologist José María Soler who began systematic studies in 1959 after discovering several metal objects (gold, silver, copper, etc.). In the spring of 1963, he unearthed the Cabezo Redondo treasure, now preserved in the Archaeological Museum of Villena. By then, much of the site had been lost due to local gypsum quarries, but since that year, the remaining area has been protected and studied.

In recent years, the University of Alicante, along with the University of Valencia and University of Granada, has conducted annual excavation campaigns led by Mauro S. Hernández Pérez, assisted by Gabriel García Atiénzar and Virginia Barciela. In 1968, the site was included in Villena's Historic-Artistic Complex and declared public-use land. In 2020, Cabezo Redondo was formally designated as an independent Cultural Heritage Site.

== Features ==
Originally, the site was significantly larger, extending across the entire hill. It is believed that populations from smaller nearby settlements around the ancient Villena Lagoon may have concentrated here, as its characteristics indicate a regional capital due to its central location, extensive size, developed urban planning, population density, and intense agricultural, livestock, metallurgical, and textile activities.

== Major finds ==
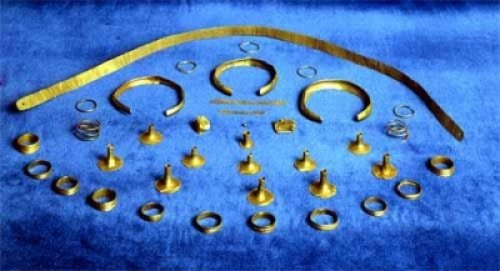
The Cabezo Redondo treasure.

- Cabezo Redondo treasure: A collection of 35 personal adornments (a diadem, rings, bracelets, pendants, beads, spirals, bands, and a small gold ingot) totaling 150 grams in weight.
- Bronze Age Loom: A loom and 48 weights were recovered during the 2008 excavation campaign, along with fragments indicating that prehistoric looms were vertical, with weights used for tensioning.

In March 2026, archaeologists detailed the discovery of a Bronze Age warp-weighted loom. Organic components of textile machinery, such as wooden frames and plant-fiber ropes, seldom survive the archaeological record, however, carbonized remains at this Mediterranean location provided structural evidence alongside traditional clay loom weights. By analyzing the spatial distribution and charred timber fragments, researchers were able to reconstruct the technical morphology of the loom, offering insights into second-millennium BC weaving techniques and the complexity of prehistoric textile economies in the Iberian Peninsula.

== See also ==
- Argaric culture
- Treasure of Villena
- History of Villena
