= Lava Treasure =

Roman hoard of coins and gold plate discovered off Corsica

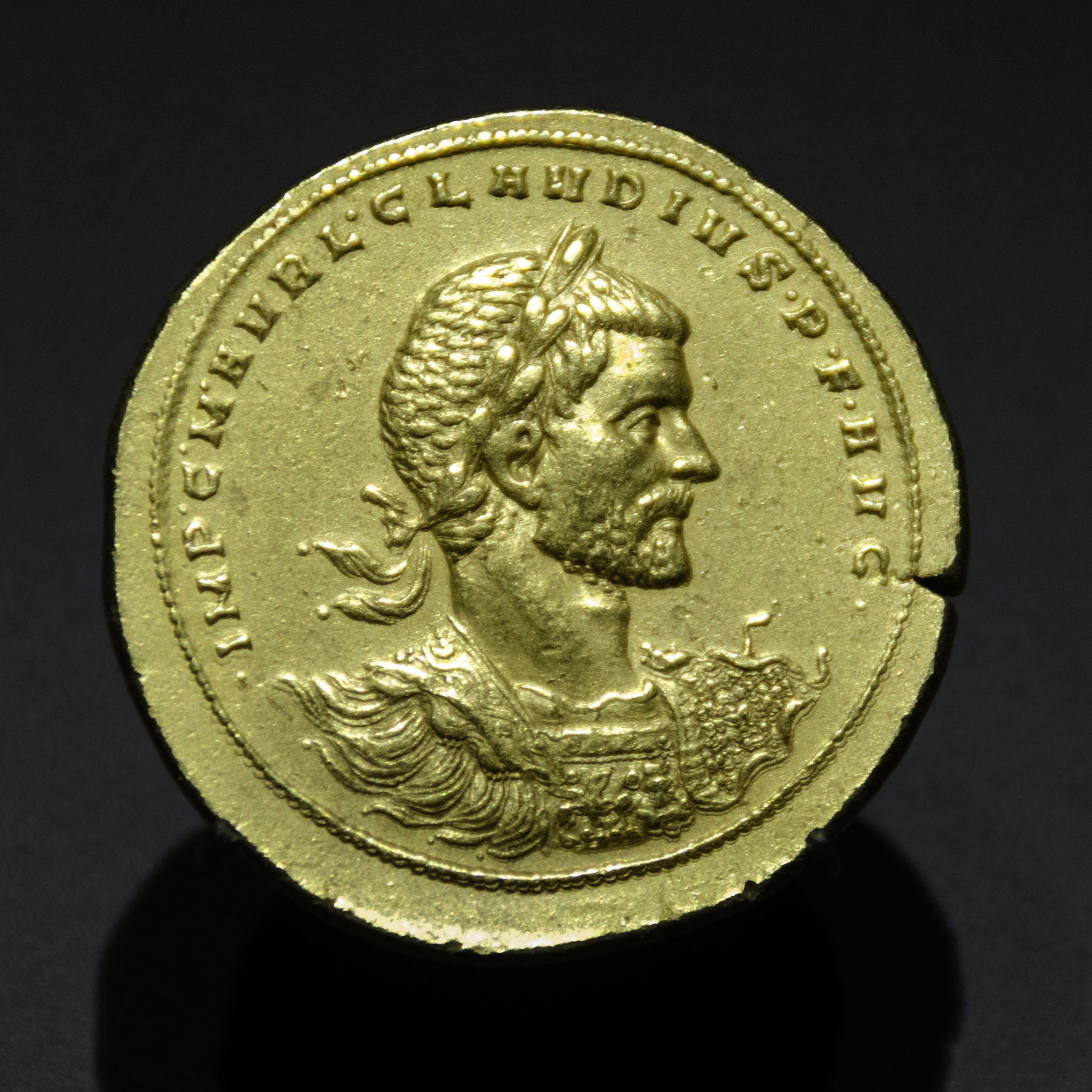
A gold medallion or multiple of Claudius Gothicus, from the Lava treasure. Equivalent to 8 regular gold aurei (weight 38.83 grams). Museo Arqueológico Nacional de España

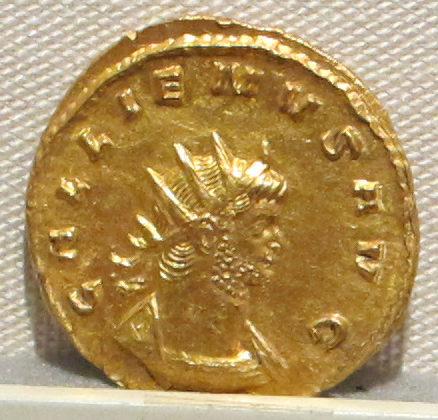
Aureus of Gallienus, similar to the numerous examples found in Lava

The Lava treasure is the Roman treasure of coins and the gold plate that was discovered underwater in the small Gulf of Lava (part of the Gulf of Ajaccio), southern Corsica, France, probably in 1958. Also known as the “Corsica hoard”, or “Mediterranean Sea hoard”. It is considered one of world's most important archaeological finds, and presents a unique testimony for the knowledge of Roman imperial coinage.

The discovery was made in the commune of Alata, Corse-du-Sud.

== Description ==
The find was never officially declared. Part of it was discovered by two brothers who were diving in the waters searching for sea urchins. Instead, they came up with several gold coins that they cleaned and then sold illegally. Under French law, all underwater archaeological finds belong to the state.

At this time, the treasure is dispersed in many private and public collections.

The gold coins found cover the period from the AD 262 Decennalia of Gallienus to the reign of Aurelian in AD 272.

Altogether, about 1,400 coins were apparently found near Lava; of these, 450 have now been identified, two-thirds of which belong to the reign of Aurelian. Many of the remainder were struck under Claudius Gothicus.

Archaeologists believe that the gold was on a galley carrying an important official that sank after a fire on board, as it sailed along this coast. This would have happened soon after the coins were minted. But the wreck, itself, was never located. Apparently some underwater geological disturbances or rock slides happened in this area since the 3rd century.

There is some evidence that the most expensive piece of the hoard — a large golden statue of a youth — had been found, but it was later melted down by the illegal excavators for its gold value.

In total, the value of the treasure is estimated at tens of millions of euros, excluding the statue. Some coins have been valued at €250,000 each.

== History of discovery ==
Mysteriously, the forty-one first pieces of gold, aurei and "multiples", appeared on the market in 1956.

A big group of coins from Lava was seized by the French justice on the coin market in 1986.

Three Corsican divers, Felix Biancamaria, his brother Angel, and their friend Marc Cotoni were involved in these finds, and were convicted in 1994 in court for illegal antiquity trade.

In 2010, a valuable Roman golden vessel belonging to the Lava Treasure was recovered by police.

== See also ==
- Beaurains Treasure
- Hoxne Hoard
- Trier Gold Hoard

== Literature ==
- Félix Biancamaria, «Le Trésor de Lava», La fièvre de l'or romain chez les plongeurs corses, Albin Michel, 2004
- Aurélie Fredy, « Le Trésor des Biancamaria », Quand la pêche aux oursins tourne à la pêche miraculeuse, Elan Sud, 2016.
- Sylvianne Estiot, The Lava Treasure of Roman Gold. Also in Trésors monétaires, volume XXIV, BNF, 2011 ISBN 9782717724929
