= Wesseling =

- Town
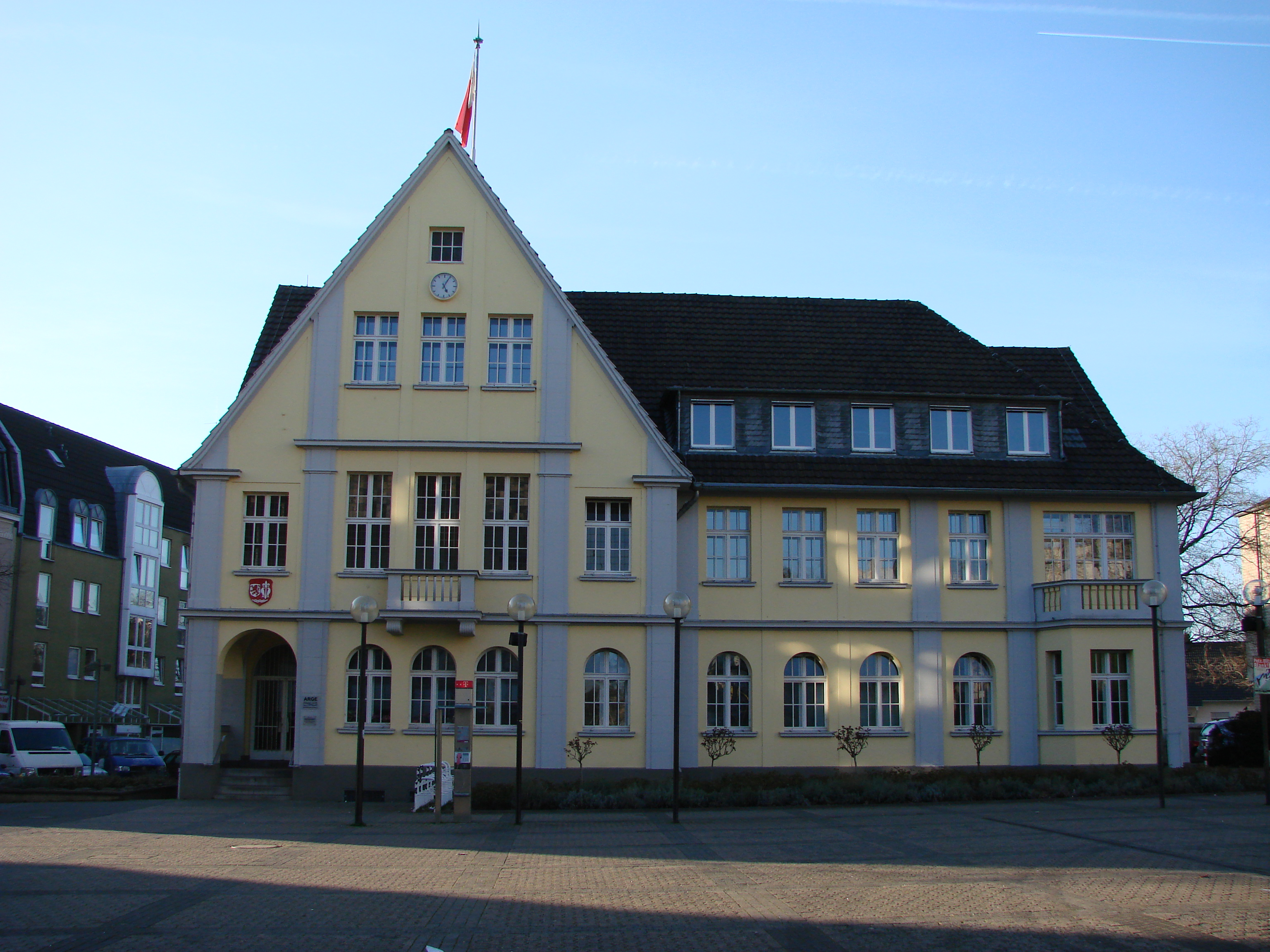
- Old town hall

- Flag Coat of arms

- Location of Wesseling within Rhein-Erft-Kreis district
- Interactive map of Wesseling
- Location within Germany Location within North Rhine-Westphalia
- Coordinates: 50°49′N 6°58′E
- Country: Germany
- State: North Rhine-Westphalia
- Admin. region: Cologne
- District: Rhein-Erft-Kreis
- Subdivisions: 4

Government
  - Mayor (2020–25): Erwin Esser (SPD)

Area
  - Total: 23.37 km^{2} (9.02 sq mi)
- Elevation: 42–62 m (138–203 ft)

Population (2025-12-31)
  - Total: 38,051
  - Density: 1,628/km^{2} (4,217/sq mi)
- Time zone: UTC+01:00 (CET)
  - Summer (DST): UTC+02:00 (CEST)
- Postal codes: 50389
- Dialling codes: 02236, 02232
- Vehicle registration: BM
- Website: www.wesseling.de

Wesseling (German pronunciation: [ˈvɛsəlɪŋ]) is an industrial German city on the Rhine bordering Cologne city on the south. With three chemical plants and a petroleum refinery within its city limits, it has an important place in the international petrochemical industry.

== History and etymology ==
The find of Roman consecration altars, the excavation of a Roman country house and Franconian burial grounds are early evidence of the settlement of the place. In 2025, the largest Hadrianic coin hoard was discovered in the city. Wesseling originates from the Latin "Wasliacum" which means "Village of Waslica". The story that Wesseling originates from "changing of the rope" (German: Cologne-bred:Wechsel de Ling) from when Rhine boats were pulled by horses is an urban legend, because the name Wesseling is centuries older than the horse-changing station, which was located in Wesseling in the 18th century.

Around 1700 there was a team changing point for towing boats in Wesseling. Until industrialization, the place between Cologne and Bonn remained rather insignificant. Only in 1793 did a tannery hint at the coming industrial age. In 1848 a democratic workers' association was founded in Wesseling. In this year, the uprising of the Treidler (Rheinhalfen) spread to the Wesselinger Treidelstation, who saw their trade endangered by the upcoming steamship. In 1880, Heinrich and Franz Zimmermann founded the 'Chemische Fabrik Wesseling' for the processing of gas cleaning mass as the origin of today's Evonik chemical works in the north of the city. In 1904 the construction of the Rheinuferbahn (Rhine bank railway) from Cologne via Wesseling to Bonn began. A transverse railway has connected Wesseling with Brühl since 1900. Today, this line is mostly used for freight traffic.

During the World War II from 1939 to 1945, around 10,000 foreign and forced laborers were employed in Wesseling's industry. For comparison, the city itself had only 7,500 inhabitants. The forced laborers, most of whom were employed in the UK and Deutsche Norton, were in wooden barrack camps accommodated. The so-called 'southern camp was located next to today's station in Wesseling-Süd. Another barracks camp was located directly on the Rhine, the so-called 'Rhine camp'. Wesseling was conquered and occupied -similar to Cologne- early March 1945 as part of Operation Lumberjack by the First United States Army.

== Population ==
Historical population

Year	Pop.	±% p.a.
1965	23,911	—
1970	26,058	+1.73%
1975	27,977	+1.43%
1980	29,006	+0.73%
1985	30,015	+0.69%
1990	30,710	+0.46%
1995	33,517	+1.76%

Year	Pop.	±% p.a.
2000	34,931	+0.83%
2005	35,589	+0.37%
2010	35,116	−0.27%
2015	35,975	+0.48%
2020	36,731	+0.42%
2025	38,051	+0.71%

Source: Landesdatabank Nordrhein-Westfalen

== Economy ==
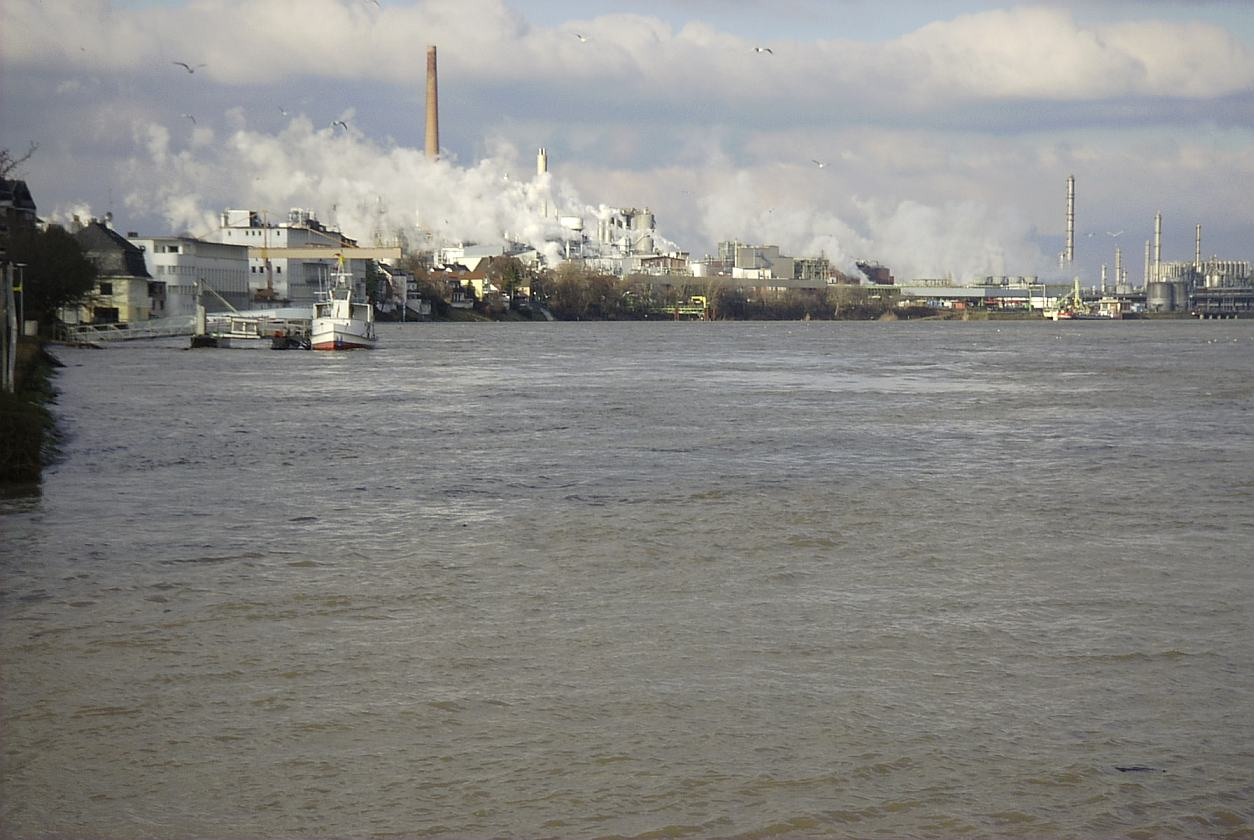
Chemical industries of Wesseling on the Rhine

In addition to 4 subdivisions, Wesseling has the industrial areas "Rheinbogen" and "Eichholz". Home to several chemical companies including Evonik, and Basell, and a Shell oil refinery; the city was a bombing target of the Oil Campaign of World War II.

== Subdivisions ==
District	Population	Area [m²]
Wesseling-Mitte	12,409	7,787,685
Keldenich	15,000	5,535,832
Berzdorf	4,869	4,293,268
Urfeld	4,057	5,756,363
Total	36,729	23,373,148

== Twin towns – sister cities ==
Wesseling is twinned with:

- Leuna, Germany
- Pontivy, France
- Traunstein, Germany
- West Devon, England, United Kingdom
