= Trier Gold Hoard =

Gold silver hoard

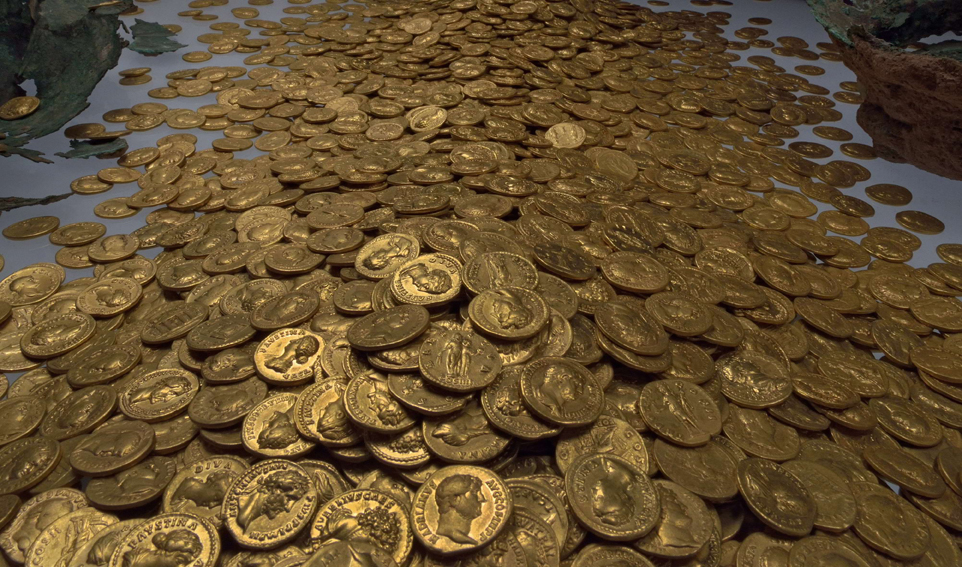
- The Trier Gold Hoard on exhibition at the Rheinisches Landesmuseum Trier
- Material: Gold
- Size: 2516 coins
- Discovered: Trier, Germany, September 1993

The Trier Gold Hoard is a hoard of 2516 (or 2518) gold coins with a weight of 18.5 kg found in Trier, Germany, in September 1993 during construction works. It is described as the largest preserved Roman gold hoard worldwide. The hoard is on exhibition at the Rheinisches Landesmuseum Trier.

== Discovery and excavation ==
On 9 September 1993, an excavator unearthed and ripped apart a bronze cauldron during excavations for an underground parking garage. Part of the cauldron and some coins went to a dump site, initially unnoticed. After the first coins were detected at the excavation site, treasure hunters also began to search the earth at the dump site.

An amateur archaeologist, Erich Eixner went back to the excavation site at night and found the larger part of the bronze cauldron, containing 560 coins and an additional lump of 1500 coins, using his metal detector. He informed the authorities of his discovery and received about 20,000 DM, a fraction of the estimated worth. It needs to be stated that, as prescribed by local law, archeologists had first explored the site but stated that no artifacts were present and construction could commence. Initial attempts to discredit the finders as "looters" were therefore unsuccessful.

== Historical context ==
The hoard was hidden for the first time in 167 AD, probably because of the Antonine Plague. The last time it was probably buried was while Augusta Treverorum was beleaguered by Clodius Albinus, since the latest coins were struck 196 AD under Septimius Severus.

== Coins ==
The earliest coins in the hoard were minted 63 AD, during the reign of Nero. 99% of the coins were minted before 167 AD. Only six coins were struck between 193 and 196 AD. The coins weigh between 5.8 and 7.6 gram. 40 Roman emperors and their relatives are depicted on the coins.

The total number of coins originally in the bronze cauldron is estimated to be 2650.

== See also ==
- Hoxne Hoard
- Lava Treasure
- Wesseling Hoard

== Bibliography ==
- Gilles, Karl-Josef (2013). Der römische Goldmünzenschatz aus der Feldstraße in Trier (in German). Trier: Trierer Zeitschrift. ISBN 978-3-923319-82-4.
