= Carlo Andrea Pozzo di Borgo =

Corsican politician and diplomat (1764–1842)

His Excellency Carlo Andrea Pozzo di Borgo
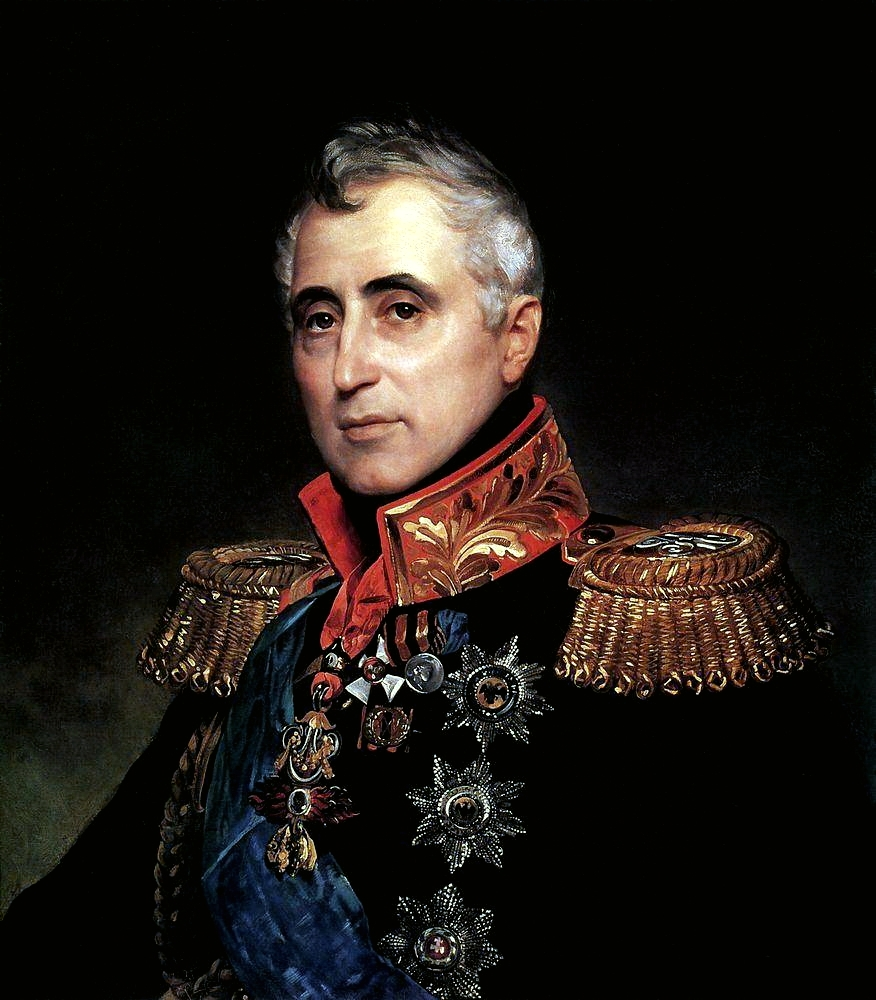
- Portrait by Karl Bryullov, 1833–1835

Russian Ambassador to the United Kingdom
- In office 5 January 1835 – 26 December 1839
- Monarch: Nicholas I
- Preceded by: Pavel Medem
- Succeeded by: Nikolay Kiselyov

Russian Ambassador to France
- In office 1 April 1814 – 5 January 1835
- Monarchs: Alexander I Nicholas I
- Preceded by: Alexander Kurakin
- Succeeded by: Peter Graf von der Pahlen

Prime Minister of the Kingdom of Corsica
- In office 17 June 1794 – 19 October 1796
- Monarch: George III
- Preceded by: Pasquale Paoli
- Succeeded by: Office abolished

Member of the French Legislative Assembly
- In office 1 October 1791 – 20 September 1792
- Constituency: Corse-du-Sud

Member of the French Constituent Assembly
- In office 9 July 1789 – 1 October 1791
- Constituency: Corse-du-Sud

Member of the Estates-General for the Third Estate
- In office 5 May 1789 – 9 July 1789
- Constituency: Corse-du-Sud

Personal details
- Born: 8 March 1764 Alata, Corsica
- Died: 15 February 1842 (aged 77) Paris, France
- Party: Monarchien (1789–1791); Feuillant (1791–1792); Legitimist (1792–1804)
- Education: University of Pisa
- Profession: Diplomat, soldier

Military service
- Allegiance: France; Kingdom of Corsica
- Branch/service: French Army; Corsican Army
- Years of service: 1792–1796
- Rank: Lieutenant general
- Unit: Colonna-Cesari Regiment
- Battles/wars: French Revolutionary Wars; Siege of Cagliari; Battle of La Maddalena

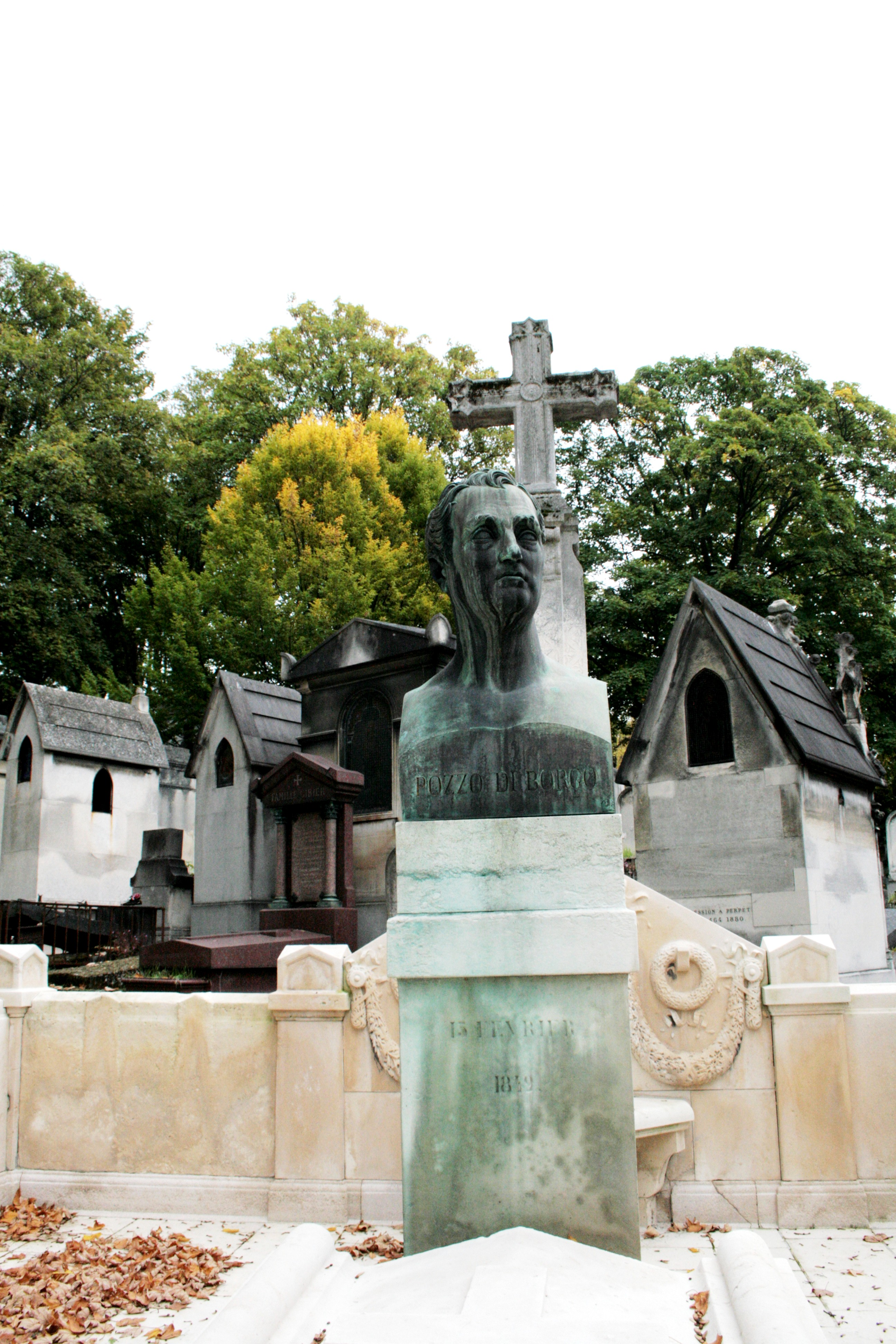
Tomb of Carlo Pozzo di Borgo at Père Lachaise cimetery (div. 57) in Paris XXe

Count Carlo Andrea Pozzo di Borgo (French: Charles-André Pozzo de Borgo; Russian: Карл Осипович Поццо ди Борго, romanized: Karl Osipovich Potso di Borgo; 8 March 1764 – 15 February 1842) was a Corsican politician, who later became a Russian diplomat.

He was an official representative of his homeland in Paris before entering the Russian diplomatic service. His life was dominated by opposition to Napoleon Bonaparte, driven by a life-long hatred of him from an early age, considering him a traitor.

== Biography ==
=== Early life and politics ===
He was born at Alata, near Ajaccio, the son of Giuseppe Pozzo di Borgo of a noble Corsican family, four years before the island became a French possession. He was educated at Pisa, and in early life was closely associated with Napoleon and Joseph Bonaparte, the two families at that time being close political allies. Pozzo was one of two delegates sent to the National Assembly in Paris to demand the political incorporation of Corsica into France, and was subsequently one of the Corsican deputies to the Legislative Assembly, where he sat on the benches of the right until the events of August 1792.

=== Chief Minister of Corsica ===
On his safe return to Corsica, he was warmly received by Pasquale Paoli, but found himself in opposition to the Bonaparte brothers who belonged to a different Corsican clan (and one he detested) who were now veering towards the Jacobin party. Under the new constitution, Pozzo was elected procureur-general-syndic, that is, chief of the civil government, while Paoli commanded the army. Along with Paoli, he refused to obey a summons to the bar of the convention, and the final breach with the Bonapartes, who actively supported the revolutionary authorities, dates from this time. Eventually, Paoli and Pozzo accepted foreign help, and from 1794 to 1796, during the British protectorate of Corsica, Pozzo was president of the council of state under Sir Gilbert Eliott.

When Napoleon sent troops to occupy the island Pozzo was excepted from the general amnesty, and took refuge in Rome, but the French authorities demanded his expulsion, and gave orders for his arrest in northern Italy. After a short stay in London he accompanied in 1798 Sir Gilbert (later Gilbert Eliott, 1st Earl of Minto) on an embassy to Vienna, where he lived for six years and was well received in political circles. His hatred of Napoleon dominated his life, and even as an exile of no official standing he was recognized as a dangerous enemy.

=== Serving the Russian Empire ===
In 1804 through the influence of Prince Adam Czartoryski he entered the Russian diplomatic service, and was sent on his first diplomatic mission in September 1805 to Vienna and Napoli, where he helped maintain the Austrian-Russian alliance after the defeat at Austerlitz. He was subsequently sent as envoy to the Anglo-Neapolitan forces, and in 1806 to the Prussian army. He was entrusted with an important mission to Constantinople in 1807, but the conclusion of the alliance between Tsar Alexander I of Russia and Napoleon at Tilsit in July interrupted his career, necessitating a temporary retirement after the completion of his business with the Porte.

He returned to Vienna, but on the demand of Napoleon for his extradition Metternich asked him to leave the capital; he left to London, where he found safety from Napoleon in one of the few countries outside the control of Paris. He renewed many old ties, and had an affair with the noted society beauty Emily Lamb, Countess Cowper, and may have fathered one or more of her children. He remained in England until 1812, when he was recalled by Tsar Alexander to service in Russia. He diligently sought to sow dissension in the Bonaparte household, and in a mission to Sweden he helped secure the cooperation of Bernadotte against Napoleon. On the entry of the allies into Paris he became commissary general to the provisional government. At the Bourbon restoration General Pozzo di Borgo became Russian ambassador at the Tuileries, and sought to secure a marriage between Charles Ferdinand, Duke of Berry, and the Russian grand duchess Anna, Alexander's sister.

=== Diplomat during Restoration ===
Pozzo assisted at the Congress of Vienna, and during the Hundred Days he joined Louis XVIII in Belgium, where he was also instructed to discuss the situation with the Duke of Wellington. He was present at Waterloo and was singled out by The Duke of Wellington in his post-battle dispatch. The Tsar dreamed of allowing an appeal to the people of France on the subject of the government of France in accordance with his vague liberalizing tendencies, but Pozzo's suggestions in this direction were met by violent opposition, the Duke refusing to make any concessions to what he regarded as rebellion; but in St. Petersburg, on the other hand, his attachment to the Bourbon dynasty was considered excessive.

During the early years of his residence in Paris Pozzo laboured tirelessly to lessen the burdens laid on France by the allies and to shorten the period of foreign occupation. That his French sympathies were recognized in Paris is shown by the strange suggestion that he should enter the French ministry with the portfolio of foreign affairs. He consistently supported the moderate party at court, and stood by the ministry of the Duc de Richelieu, thus earning the distrust and dislike of Metternich, who held him responsible for the revival of Liberal agitation in France. His influence at the Tuileries declined with the accession of Charles X, whose reactionary tendencies had always been distasteful to him; but at the revolution of 1830, when Tsar Nicholas was reluctant to acknowledge Louis-Philippe I, he did good service in preventing difficulties with Russia.

=== Later life and death ===
In 1832 he visited St Petersburg; the next year he was in London renewing its relations with Wellington, and early in 1835 he was suddenly transferred to the London embassy in succession to Prince Lieven. Although he did not lose in official standing, Pozzo was aware that this change was due to suspicions long harboured in various quarters in St Petersburg that his diplomacy was too favourable to French interests. He complained that the British Foreign Secretary, Lord Palmerston, treated him with appalling rudeness, once keeping him waiting for two hours; the fact that he had once been the lover of Lady Cowper, Palmerston's mistress, cannot have made for friendly relations between the two men. In London his health suffered, and he retired from the service in 1839 to spend the rest of his days in Paris. He had been made a count and peer of France in 1818.

== Honours and awards ==
- Knight of the Order of St. Andrew, with diamonds
- Knight Grand Cross of the 1st class of the Order of St. Vladimir
- Knight of the Order of St. Alexander Nevsky
- Knight Grand Cross of the 1st class of the Order of St. Anna
- Knight 4th class of the Order of St. George
- A mark of distinction for "XXXV years irreproachable service"
- Knight Grand Cross of the Sacred Military Constantinian Order of Saint George (Naples)
- Knight Grand Cross of the Order of Saint Ferdinand and of Merit (Naples)
- Knight of the Order of the Black Eagle (Prussia)
- Knight 1st class of the Order of the Red Eagle (Prussia)
- Knight Grand Cross of the Order of St. Stephen (Austria)
- Knight Grand Cross of the Royal Guelphic Order (Hanover)
- Knight Commander of the Order of Saints Maurice and Lazarus (Sardinia)
- Knight Commander of the Order of Saint Louis (France)
- Knight of the Order of the Golden Fleece (Spain)
- Knight Grand Cross of the Order of Charles III (Spain)
- Knight Grand Cross of the Order of the Tower and Sword (Portugal)

== In popular culture ==
He was played by Norman Shelley in the British historical drama The Iron Duke (1934). He was also the subject of a semi-documentary US film in 1942 called Vendetta, part of The Passing Parade series. The film served as wartime propaganda which equated di Borgo's service in the defeat of Napoleon to that necessary for the defeat of Adolf Hitler.

== Ancestry ==
Ancestors of Carlo Andrea Pozzo di Borgo

8. Geronimo Francesco Antonio Pozzo di Borgo (1679-1720)
4. Carlo Maria Pozzo di Borgo (b. 1705)
9. Maria Maddalena Peraldi (d. 1724)
2. Giuseppe Maria Pozzo di Borgo (1730–1781)
10. Carlo Casalonga (1691–1727)
5. Maria Graziosa Casalonga (1709–1765)
11. Dorotea Maria Pozzo di Borgo
1. Carlo Andrea, count Pozzo di Borgo (1764–1842)
12. Pietro Maria Giovannaï (1670–1741)
6. Geronimo Giovannaï (1704––744)
13. Anna Maria Pozzo di Borgo (b. 1666)
3. Maria Maddalena Giovannaï (1727–1803)
7. Graziosa NN

== Sources ==
- "Поццо ди Борго, Карл-Андрей" . Brockhaus and Efron Encyclopedic Dictionary (in Russian). 1906.
