= Alata, Corse-du-Sud =

Commune in Corsica, France

Alata
- Commune
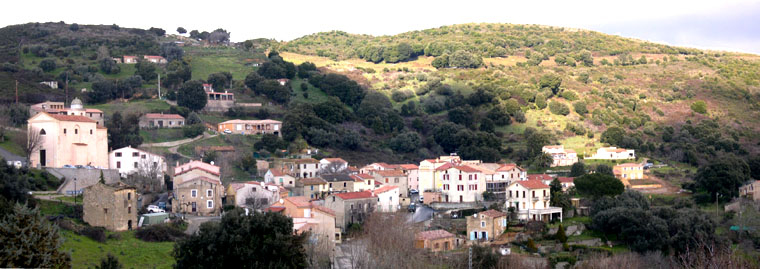
- A general view of Alata
- Location of Alata
- Location within France Location within Corsica
- Coordinates: 41°58′40″N 8°44′38″E
- Country: France
- Region: Corsica
- Department: Corse-du-Sud
- Arrondissement: Ajaccio
- Canton: Ajaccio-5
- Intercommunality: CA Pays Ajaccien

Government
  - Mayor (2020–2026): Étienne Ferrandi
- Area^{1}: 30.37 km^{2} (11.73 sq mi)
- Elevation: 450 m (1,480 ft)
- Highest elevation: 782 m (2,566 ft)
- Lowest elevation: 0 m (0 ft)
- Population (2023): 3,681
  - Density: 121.2/km^{2} (313.9/sq mi)
- Time zone: UTC+01:00 (CET)
  - Summer (DST): UTC+02:00 (CEST)
- INSEE/Postal code: 2A006 /20167
- ^{1} French Land Register data, which excludes lakes, ponds, glaciers > 1 km^{2} (0.386 sq mi or 247 acres) and river estuaries.

Alata (French pronunciation: [alata]) is a commune in the Corse-du-Sud department, on the French island of Corsica. It is within the metropolitan area of the capital Ajaccio.

== Geography ==
Alata is 7 km north of the city of Ajaccio and the village is at an altitude of 400m. Alata borders the sea in the Gulf of Lava which is in the Gulf of Sagone. The geographic boundaries of the town are between the Monte Gozzi, the Gulf of Lava, La Punta - Pozzo di Borgo, Ajaccio, Villanova, Appietto and Afa (neighbouring communes) with its 3250 hectares of scrub and large forests of oak.

The commune can be accessed on road D61 north from Ajaccio. The D61 continues through the commune to the north and joins road D81. The D261 road branches west off the D61 to Villanova and the coast west of the commune. The D461 road turns east from the D61 in the commune to access the village of Alata where it terminates. The D81 road traverses the east side of the commune and accesses some of the villages there which have no direct connection with the village of Alata. The coastal portion of the commune is accessed by mountain roads leading off the D61.

Other than Alata village there are a number of other villages in the commune. These are:

- Marina di Lava (on the coast)
- Carbinica
- San Benedettu
- Picchio
- Balisaccia
- Pietrosella
- Tuscia
- Truva
- Rainuchiettu
- Marchesi
- Pruno
- Bellaranda

There are also some built-up areas which have no names.

== History ==
The first village was settled close to the Monticchi towers defense post and watchtower, now in ruins but still visible above the present village. Alata has been the seat of the Pozzo di Borgo family since the 16th century.

== Administration ==
List of Successive Mayors of Alata

From	To	Name	Party
1830		Gieronimo Casalonga	
1929	1943	Charles Marie Casa	
1960	1989	Jérôme Paul Casalonga	
1989	2006	François Dominic	PRG
2006	2026	Etienne Ferrandi	PRG

== Population ==
The inhabitants of the commune are known as Alatais or Alataises in French.

Historical population
Year	Pop.	±% p.a.
1968	410	—
1975	452	+1.40%
1982	1,132	+14.01%
1990	2,077	+7.88%
1999	2,459	+1.89%
2007	2,962	+2.35%
2012	3,076	+0.76%
2017	3,244	+1.07%
2023	3,681	+2.13%
Source: INSEE

== Economy ==
- Farming and production of Corsican specialties (Brocciu, figatelli, etc.)
- a hotel in the village
- a large holiday resort located on the sea coast (Marina di Lava)

== Culture and heritage ==
=== Civil heritage ===
The Château de la punta (19th century) is registered as an historical monument.

Located 600 m above sea level, the chateau offers a panoramic view of Ajaccio up to the entrance of the Gulf of Porto over the surrounding mountains and over Monte Cinto, the highest mountain in Corsica (2706 m).

A replication of one of the pavilions of the Tuileries Palace in Paris that burned down in 1871. When, in 1882, it was decided to completely destroy the Palace in Paris, Jerome Pozzo di Borgo, a great enemy of Napoleon I, acquired a large number of the stones to build a house on the family estate located on the heights of Ajaccio to show his supremacy.

The reconstruction of the castle took place from 1886 to 1894. Unfortunately the castle was burned on 7 August 1978 by a bush fire which spread to the roof causing serious damage. In 1991 the General Council of South Corsica decided on the acquisition of the Château de la Punta and its area of 40 hectares from the Pozzo di Borgo family.

The repair of the roof was completed in 1996 making the castle safe from further damage due to rain. The castle is not yet completely saved however.

The Golfe de Lava is a Gulf with a holiday village in the commune of Alata where, in 1985, three pieces of Roman gold were found by three fishermen. This was the starting point of a treasure hunt that ended with the Police investigation. The many items found are known as the Lava Treasure.

=== Religious heritage ===
The commune has one religious building that is registered as an historical monument:

- The Pozzo di Borgo Funeral Chapel (19th century).
- The Parish Church of Saint-Peter and Saint Paul contains a Tabernacle (17th century) that is registered as an historical object:
- The Parish Church of Saint-Pierre-aux-Liens contains a Tabernacle (17th century) that is registered as an historical object:

== Notable People linked to the commune ==
- Carlo Andrea Pozzo di Borgo
- Jean-Laurent Albertini, a painter originally from Albertacce.

== See also ==
- Communes of the Corse-du-Sud department
