= José María Soler García =

Spanish archaeologist, historian, and researcher (1905–1996)

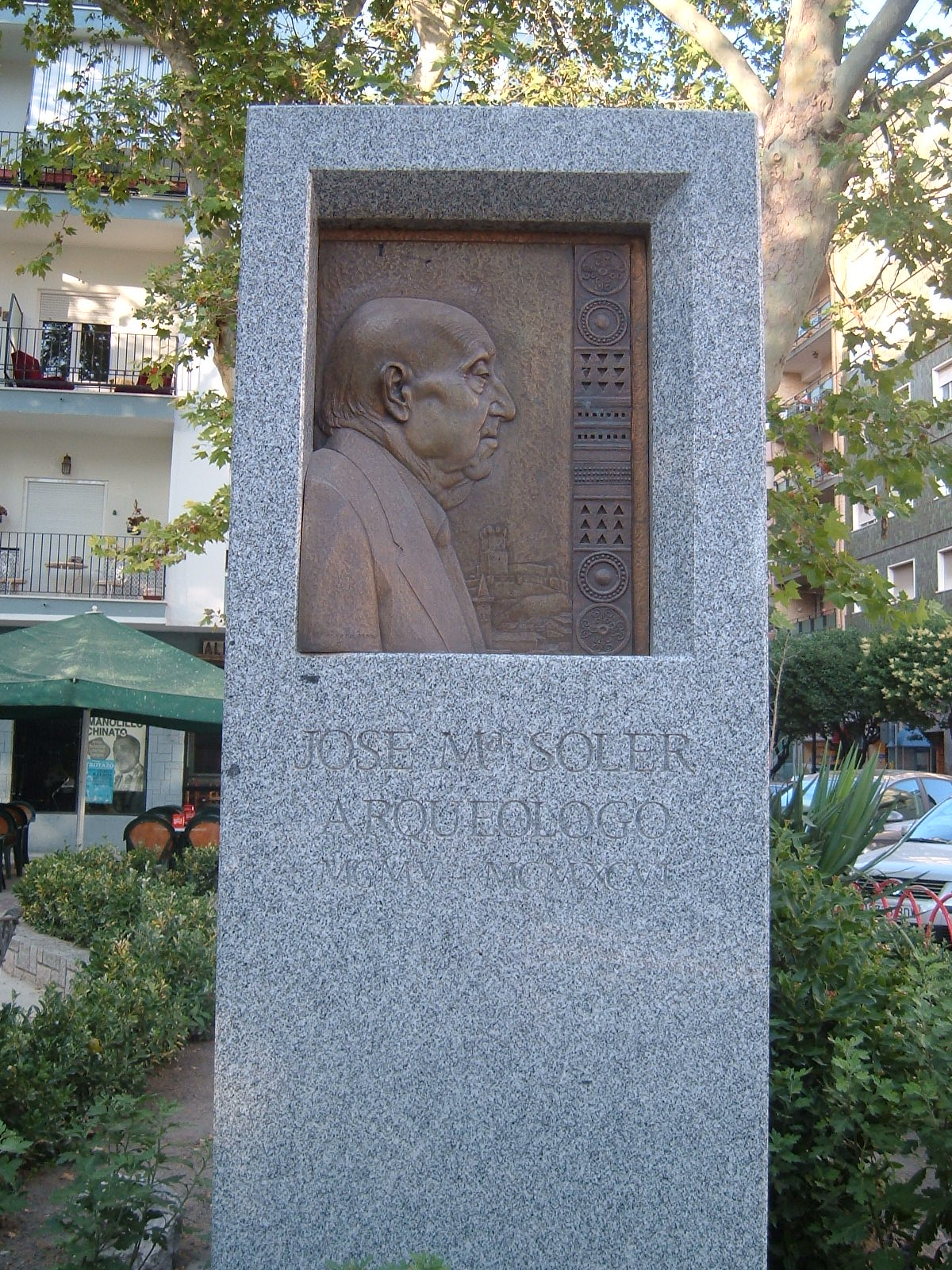
- Monument to José María Soler in Villena
- Born: 30 September 1905; Villena, Spain
- Died: 25 August 1996 (aged 90); Villena
- Occupations: Archaeologist, Historian, Researcher, Folklorist, Mail carrier, Accountant
- Writing career
- Language: Spanish
- Period: 1930-1996
- Website: josemariasoler.org

José María Soler García (30 September 1905 – 25 August 1996) was a Spanish archaeologist, historian, researcher and folklorist. Much of his research focused on the area around the city of Villena, Soler's hometown.

After almost 30 years of fieldwork, Solar founded Villena's Archaeological Museum in 1957, showcasing his findings. In March of 1963, he discovered Tesorillo del Cabezo Redondo (the Treasure of the Cabezo Redondo) in March and the Tesoro de Villena (Treasure of Villena) in December. Along with the addition of these discoveries, the museum's name was officially changed to Archaeological Museum "José María Soler". The José María Soler Foundation, constituted after his death, sponsors annual Research Awards in order to keep Soler's legacy alive.

== Publications ==
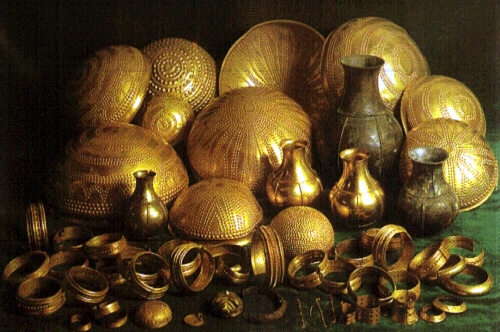
Treasure of Villena, the second biggest gold finding in Europe.

Soler wrote several books on his archaeological works, some others on historical or folkloric research and even one dictionary on Villena's Spanish dialect. He wrote a large number of articles published in newspapers and magazines, and he also gave many lectures all over Spain. A list of his published books follows:

- Archaeology
  - 1956. El yacimiento musteriense de "La Cueva del Cochino" (Villena-Alicante)
  - 1965. El tesoro de Villena
  - 1969. El oro de los tesoros de Villena
  - 1981. El Eneolítico en Villena
  - 1987. Excavaciones arqueológicas en el Cabezo Redondo (Villena, Alicante)
  - 1991. La Cueva del Lagrimal
  - 1993. Guía de los yacimientos y del Museo de Villena
- History
  - 1948. Crónica de las Fiestas de septiembre de 1948
  - 1969. La Relación de Villena de 1575
  - 1976. Villena: Prehistoria - Historia - Monumentos
  - 1981-1988. Historia de Villena
  - 1993. La colección numismática de José Mª Soler
  - 2006. Historia de Villena: desde la Prehistoria hasta el siglo XVIII (re-ed. 2009)
- Linguistics
  - 1993. Dicionario villenero (reed. 2005)
- Music and folklore
  - 1979. El Polifonista villenense Ambrosio Cotes
  - 1986. Cancionero popular de Villena (re-ed. 2005)
- Other themes
  - 1958. Bibliografía de Villena y su Partido Judicial
  - 1976. I Congreso Nacional de Fiestas de Moros y Cristianos
  - 1984. Soldadescas, Comparsas y Toros

== Awards ==
- Musicology Award of CSIC, on the Cancionero popular de Villena (1949)
- Golden Medal of Villena (1973)
- Bronze Medal in Fine Arts (1980)
- Montaigne Award of Hamburg's FvS Foundation (1981)
- Doctor honoris causa by Universidad de Alicante (1985)
- Gold Medal of the Province of Alicante (1991)

In addition, Villena's City Hall gave his name to one street in the old part of the city in 1979.
