= Norfolk Carnyx Hoard =

Iron Age hoard in Norfolk, England

- Created: 1st century AD
- Discovered: 2025; Near Thetford

The Norfolk Carnyx Hoard is an Iron Age hoard discovered on a building site a few miles from Thetford, Norfolk, in the United Kingdom. Thought to have been buried during the 1st century AD, it features the most complete carnyx (a type of battle trumpet) found in Europe, the first ever boar's head flag standard to be found in Britain, and other related items such as shield bosses.

== Contents ==
The hoard includes a near-complete animal-headed carnyx, or battle trumpet. This is one of just three that have been found in Britain, and one of the most complete found in Europe. It was likely used by Celtic tribes, falling in the former territory of the Iceni, though it is not known whether the hoard was buried by the Iceni. It would have been mounted on a long mouthpiece above the heads of warriors, allowing it to be sounded to intimidate enemies in battle. Parts of another carnyx have also been found at the site.

Secondly, the hoard features the first-ever boar's head flag standard found in Britain, made from sheet-bronze. In the hoard, there additionally exist components of other carnyces, five shield bosses, and associated metalwork. Archaeologists believe that the hoard was buried during the 1st century AD.

== Discovery ==
The hoard was discovered in summer 2025, during a routine excavation, part of the standard planning process for residential properties, by independent archaeological company Pre-Construct Archaeology (PCA). This was on privately owned land, on a building site a few miles from Thetford, Norfolk, though the exact location has not been disclosed. It was lifted intact, within a block of soil, to preserve its archaeological context. Research and conservation of the hoard is being coordinated by Norfolk Museums Service, Historic England, and the National Museum of Scotland. The soil block underwent non-invasive imaging, including X-ray and CT scanning, showing how the items were positioned within it. Norfolk Museums Service conservators then removed each object for examination.

It has been noted that the items are in a highly fragile condition, requiring extensive stabilisation work before detailed research can start. Additionally, the legal status of the hoard currently sits with a coroner who will decide its future according to the Treasure Act 1996, a decision expected in early 2026. The discovery of the hoard featured in an episode of Digging for Britain, broadcast on BBC Two on 14 January 2026.
