= Ocomtún =

Ancient city in Mexico

- Maatz'
- Location within Mexico
- Periods: Classic
- Cultures: Maya civilization
- Location: Mexico
- Region: Campeche

History
- Built: 250 - 1000 AD

Site notes
- Discovered: 2023

Ocomtún, whose original name could have been Maatz', is an ancient Late Classic Maya city located on the Yucatan Peninsula in the Mexican state of Campeche. Archaeologists from Mexico's National Institute of Anthropology and History announced the discovery of the city in June 2023, after finding the ruins of several pyramid structures measuring approximately 15 m (49 ft 2 1/2 in) in height in a relatively unexplored area of the state. Analysis of pottery fragments found in the area indicate the area was inhabited by the Maya people between 600 CE and 800 CE, and that the city fell into ruin in around 1000 CE, coinciding with the Classic Maya collapse. Archaeologists named the site Ocomtún after the Mayan word for stone column.

== Discovery ==
The site was discovered during an expedition led by Dr. Ivan Šprajc after he received Lidar images showing significant human cultural structures hidden in the landscape. Šprajc named the site after the many cylindrical columns scattered throughout the settlement. The research was carried out in May and June 2023.

== The archaeological site ==
Ocumtún is located in the Balamkú Ecological Conservation Zone, in a virtually impenetrable place. The lush jungle vegetation creates what has been referred to as a ''black hole'' on the archaeological map of the central Maya Lowlands. Because exploration had never occurred, there was not a single known site in an area of approximately 3,000-4,000 sq km. Lidar research is conducted during flights over areas using surveillance equipment that penetrates the vegetation and creates images of the terrain and any structures below it.

"Truly massive", as Šprajc called it, the site consists of a "monumental nucleus" covering more than 50 hectares, pyramids, stone columns, altars, three plazas, and a Maya ball game court.
