= HMCS Spitfire =

Pilot boat and military craft in colonial Australia (1855)

History

Australia
- Owner: Colony of New South Wales (1855–1859)
- Builder: Cuthberts Shipyard, Port Jackson
- Launched: 3 April 1855
- Decommissioned: 1859
- Home port: Port Jackson, New South Wales
- Fate: Sold into civilian service

General characteristics
- Type: Ketch (gunboat)
- Displacement: 65 tons
- Length: 51 ft (16 m)
- Beam: 16.6 ft (5.1 m)
- Draught: 5.41 ft (1.65 m)
- Propulsion: Sail
- Armament: As HMCS Spitfie: 1 × 32-pounder guns pivot gun

HMCS Spitfire was a 65-ton sail gunboat built at Cuthberts Shipyard, Port Jackson, Australia and launched on 3 April 1855 for the Colony of New South Wales. Her hull was sheathed with 22-ounce copper. She was the first warship built in Australia for a colonial government. Spitfire was given to the Colony of Queensland in 1859 and she was used as the pilot cutter on Moreton Bay. In 1860, she was used as part of an expedition to find the mouth of the Burdekin River. She was to become the pilot boat for Cooktown, until sold out of service in 1885 and purchased by Captain Alex Mathewson, for use as a fishing vessel. She was sold in 1892 to Dan Moynahan and S.B. Andreassen and during a cyclone in 1896 she was damaged off Hinchinbrook Island.

== Fate ==
Spitfire was sunk during a cyclone off Piper Island Light off Cape York (Queensland) on 21 August 1898, with her crew rescued by Omi Maru. The wreck was discovered 128 years later to the day, on 21 August 2026.
