= Schaalby =

Schalby Skålby
- Municipality
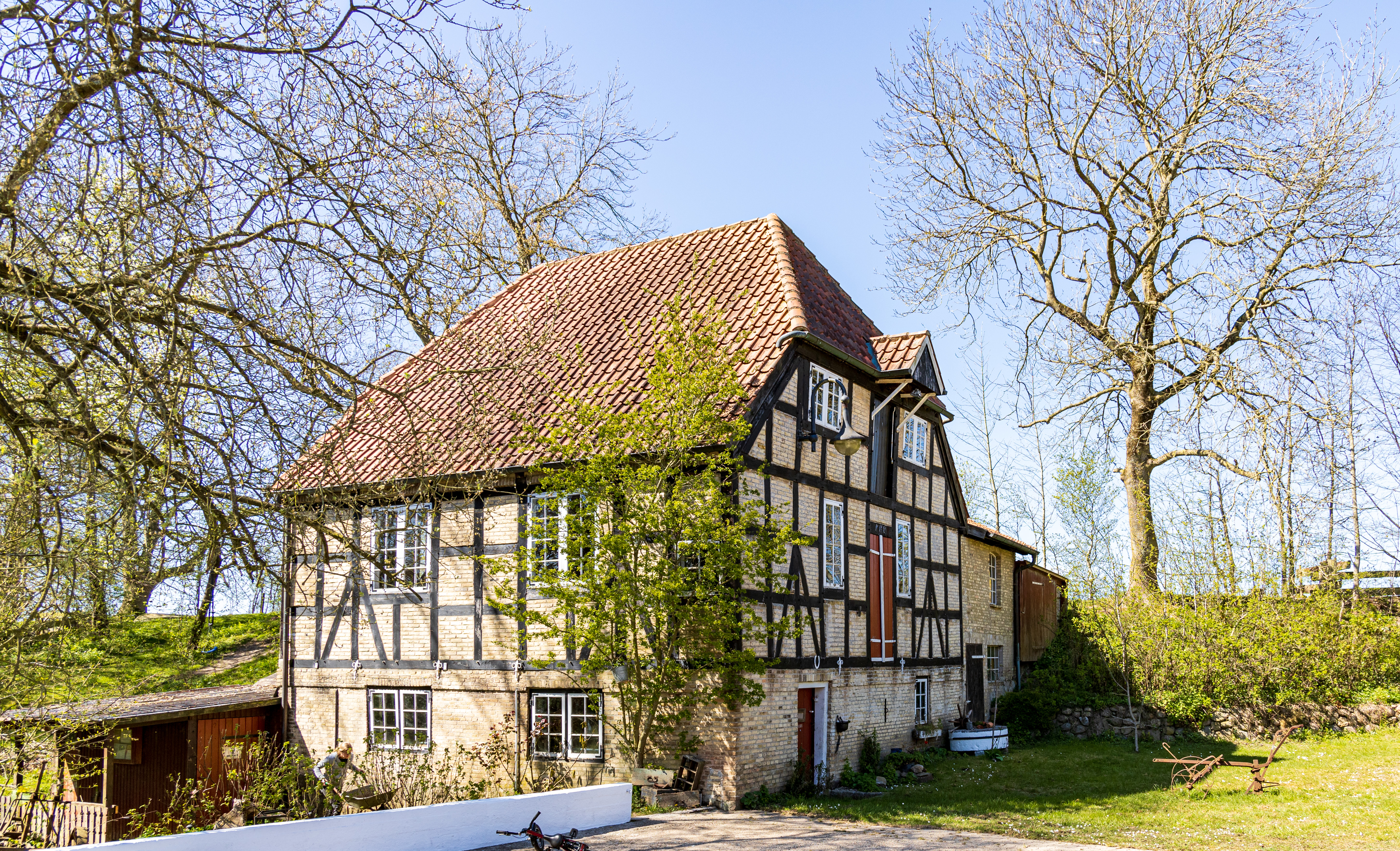
- Schaalby mill and museum

- Coat of arms

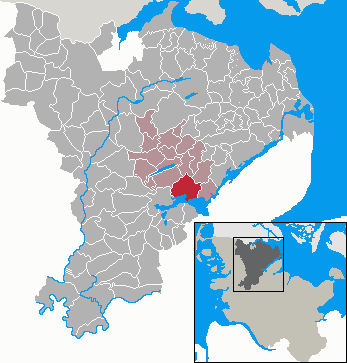
- Location of Schalby; Skålby within Schleswig-Flensburg district
- Interactive map of Schalby; Skålby
- Location within Germany Location within Schleswig-Holstein
- Coordinates: 54°33′N 9°38′E
- Country: Germany
- State: Schleswig-Holstein
- District: Schleswig-Flensburg
- Municipal assoc.: Südangeln

Government
  - Mayor: Eckhard Schröder

Area
  - Total: 24.99 km^{2} (9.65 sq mi)
- Elevation: 14 m (46 ft)

Population (2025-12-31)
  - Total: 1,486
  - Density: 59.46/km^{2} (154.0/sq mi)
- Time zone: UTC+01:00 (CET)
  - Summer (DST): UTC+02:00 (CEST)
- Postal codes: 24882
- Dialling codes: 04622
- Vehicle registration: SL
- Website: www.amt- suedangeln.de

Schaalby (Danish: Skålby) is a municipality in the district of Schleswig-Flensburg, in Schleswig-Holstein, Germany. The municipality consists of the villages Füsing, Klensby, Moldenit and Schaalby.
