= Pirkko-Liisa Lehtosalo-Hilander =

Finnish archaeologist (1934–2026)

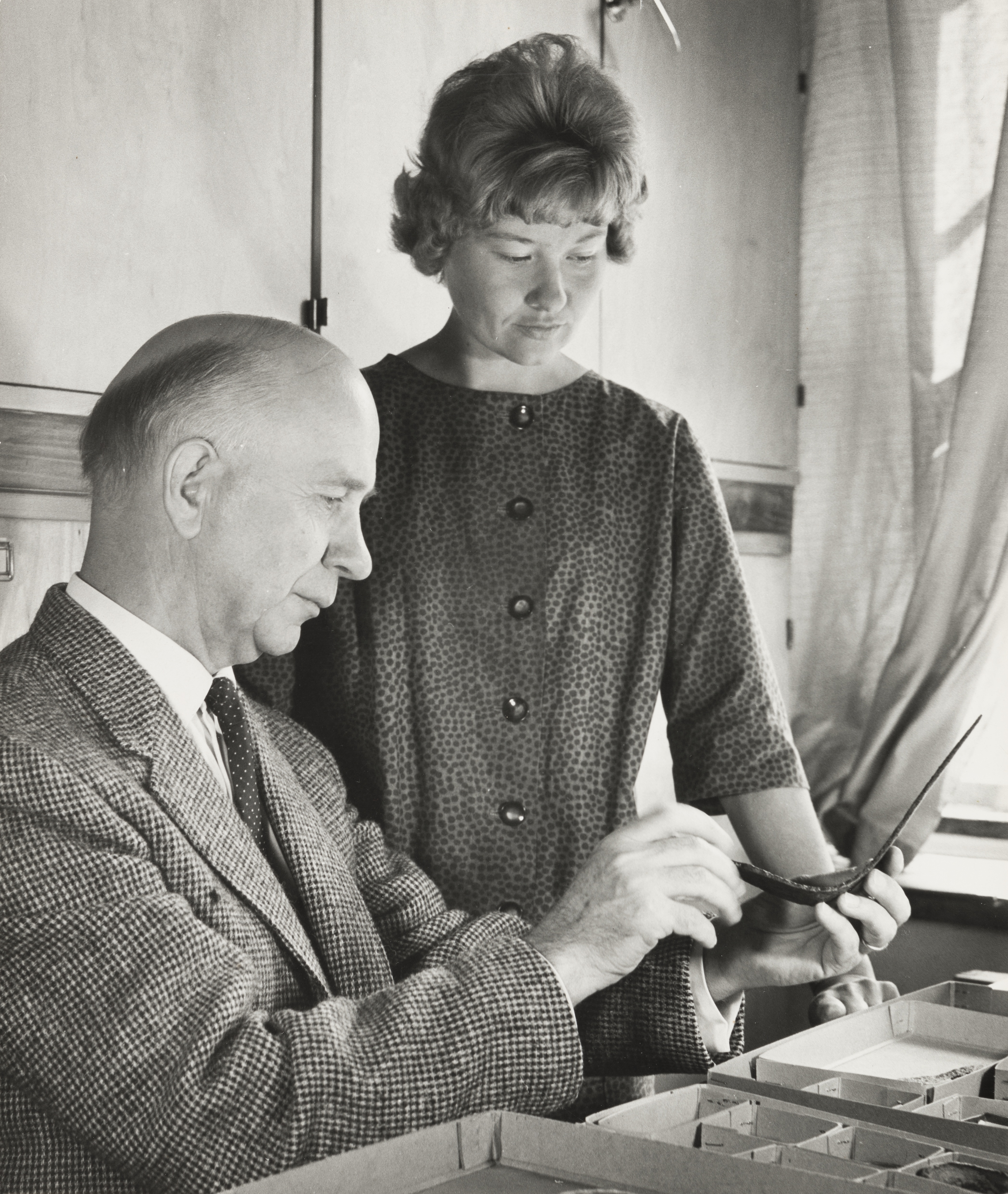
Pirkko-Liisa Lehtosalo-Hilander (right) with Helmer Salmo (left) in 1969

Pirkko-Liisa Lehtosalo-Hilander (9 June 1934 — 30 April 2026) was a Finnish archaeologist. She focused specifically on the Finnish Viking Age and the period of the Crusades, i.e. the 11th, 12th and 13th century religious military campaigns.

== Life and career ==
Lehtosalo-Hilander was born in Lahti on 9 June 1934. She studied archaeology at the University of Helsinki and received her Ph.D. degree in 1982 with the dissertation Luistari, Vol. 3: A burial-ground reflecting the Finnish viking age society. She was employed by her alma mater, as well as by the Finnish Heritage Agency, the Academy of Finland, and the University of Turku.

She worked extensively e.g. with the Luistari Burial Ground in Eura, Southern Finland. The Luistari site is the largest known Iron Age burial ground in Finland. The site has served also as a place of residence already in the Bronze Age, but the remains of the residence/residences have been nearly entirely destroyed later when the burial ground was built.

Archaeologists have investigated already over 1300 graves of adults and children at the Luistari site. Based on the excavations, the burials were made between the years 500 AD and 1200 AD. Archaeologists have found several remains of clothing, jewelry and other items at the Luistari site.

Lehtosalo-Hilander also focused on ancient Finnish dresses. Costumes have been made according to dress fragments found in prehistoric graves. These costumes have become the festal garments of many Finnish women.

Lehtosalo-Hilander died in Helsinki on 30 April 2026, at the age of 91.

== Bibliography ==
- Ancient Finnish Costumes. 1984, Vammala. ISBN 951-99605-4-6
- Savon historia (History of Savonia), Part I, Pirkko-Liisa Lehtosalo-Hilander, Kauko Pirinen, Kustannuskiila Oy, Kuopio, Savon Sanomain Kirjapaino Oy, 1988.
- Luistari, Vol. 4: A History of Weapons and Ornaments. 2000, Finska Fornminnesföreningens Tidskrift, no. 107. Helsinki. ISBN 951-9057-37-4
- Kalastajista kauppanaisiin: Euran esihistoria ["From Fishermen to Businesswomen: Prehistory of Eura"], 2000.
- Viikinkejä Eurassa? ["Vikings in Eura?"], by Pirkko-Liisa Lehtosalo-Hilander and Sirpa Wahlqvist, 2001.
