= Wesseling Hoard =

934 denarii Roman coin hoard found in Wesseling, Germany

- Type: Roman coin hoard
- Material: silver, ceramic, straw
- Created: 124-125 AD
- Period/culture: Nerva–Antonine dynasty
- Discovered: 2025; public 22 September 2026; Wesseling, Germany; 50° 49′ 0″ N, 6° 58′ 0″ E
- Discovered by: Oliver Riedl
- Present location: Rheinisches Landesmuseum Bonn
- Classification: Hoard
- Identification: 22332
- Culture: Roman Empire

The Wesseling hoard is a Hadrianic-era Roman coin hoard consisting of 934 silver denarii. Discovered in 2025, on cultivated land in the town of Wesseling, North Rhine-Westphalia, Germany, it is the fifth largest Nerva–Antonine dynasty coin hoard known so far, weighing 3.1 kilograms (6.8 pounds). On 22 September 2026, the discovery of the hoard was announced, and is under the display and ownership of the Rheinisches Landesmuseum Bonn.

== Discovery ==
In 2025, amateur archaeologist/metal detectorist Oliver Riedl was detecting a plot of land in the town of Wesseling after receiving the Schutzzone permit, when a signal lit up. Upon digging, Riedl recovered a total of 15 denarii, and realizing the significance of the find, alerted authorities. The subsequent excavation was supervised by the LVR Office for the Preservation of Archaeological Monuments in the Rhineland, which continued the dig, to which more denarii were extracted. A decision was taken to extract the hoard in the form of a whole chunk of earth and which went to Rheinisches Landesmuseum Bonn for further analysis.

X-ray scanning, and the disassembly of the hoard, yielded a total of 934 denarii, weighing 3.1 kilograms (300 denarii is the average salary of a Legionary under Hadrian). Ceramic fragments and straw were also extracted from the earth, indicating that the coins were deposited in the container, although millennia of agricultural activity shattered the pot and scattered the coins. It is estimated that the size of the cache amounts to 6 years of disposable income for its original owner.

The coinage range from 148 BC during the Roman Republic, with a bulk of the coins minted between 69-96 AD during the Flavian dynasty consisting of Vespasian, Titus, and Domitian. The terminus coin dated to 124-125 AD during the reign of Hadrian, which sets its approximate burial to the second quarter of the 2nd century.

Appraisal of the hoard by the Landesmuseum Bonn officially verified the hoard as the largest Hadrianic hoard verified in Germany, and the fifth largest in the world in that period. Since 22 September 2026, the hoard is now on public display, and is catalogued by University of Oxford's Coin Hoards of the Roman Empire database as No. 22332.

== See also ==
- Trier Gold Hoard
