= Paola Pelagatti =

Italian archaeologist (1927–2026)

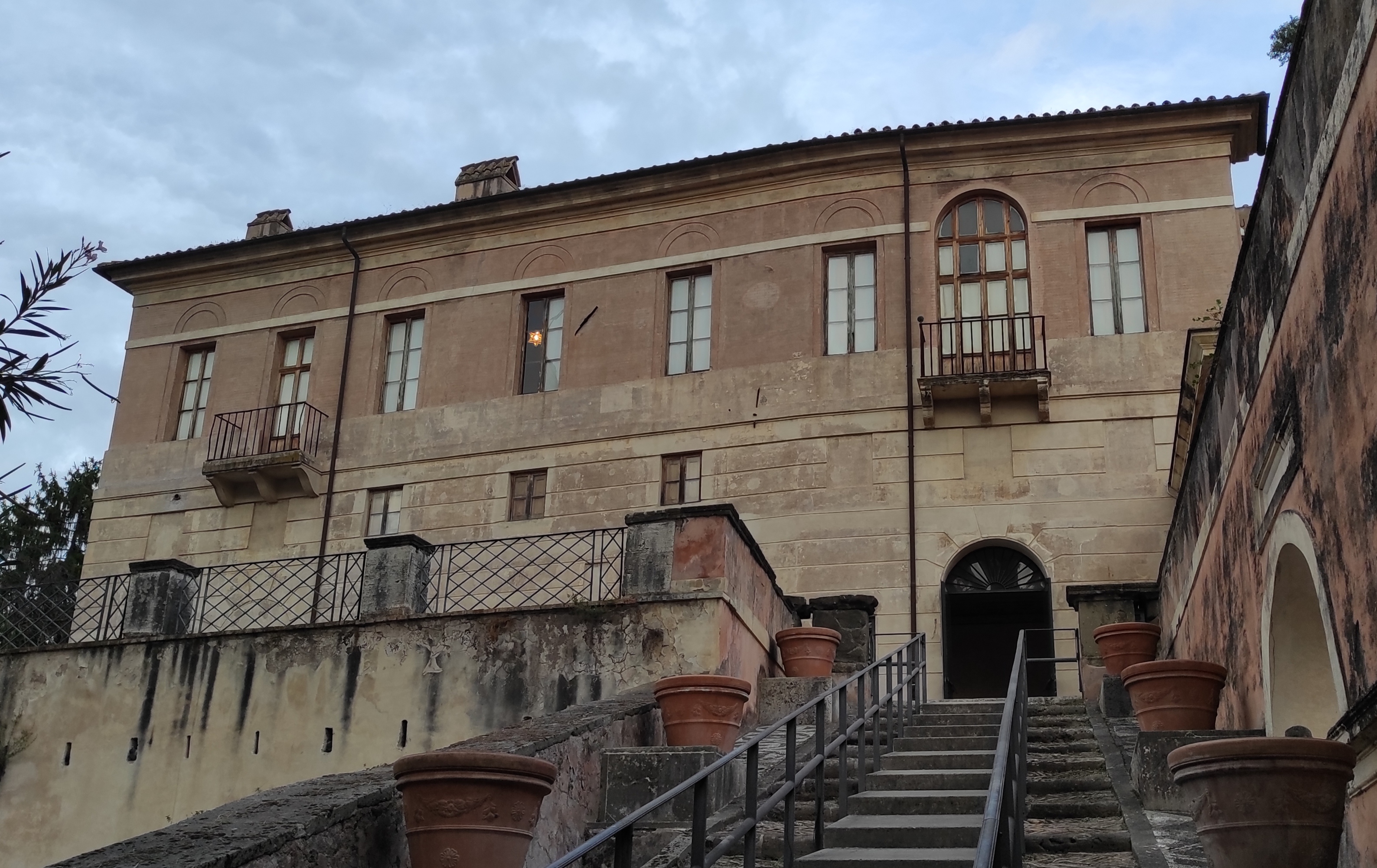
The Villa Poniatowski, Rome

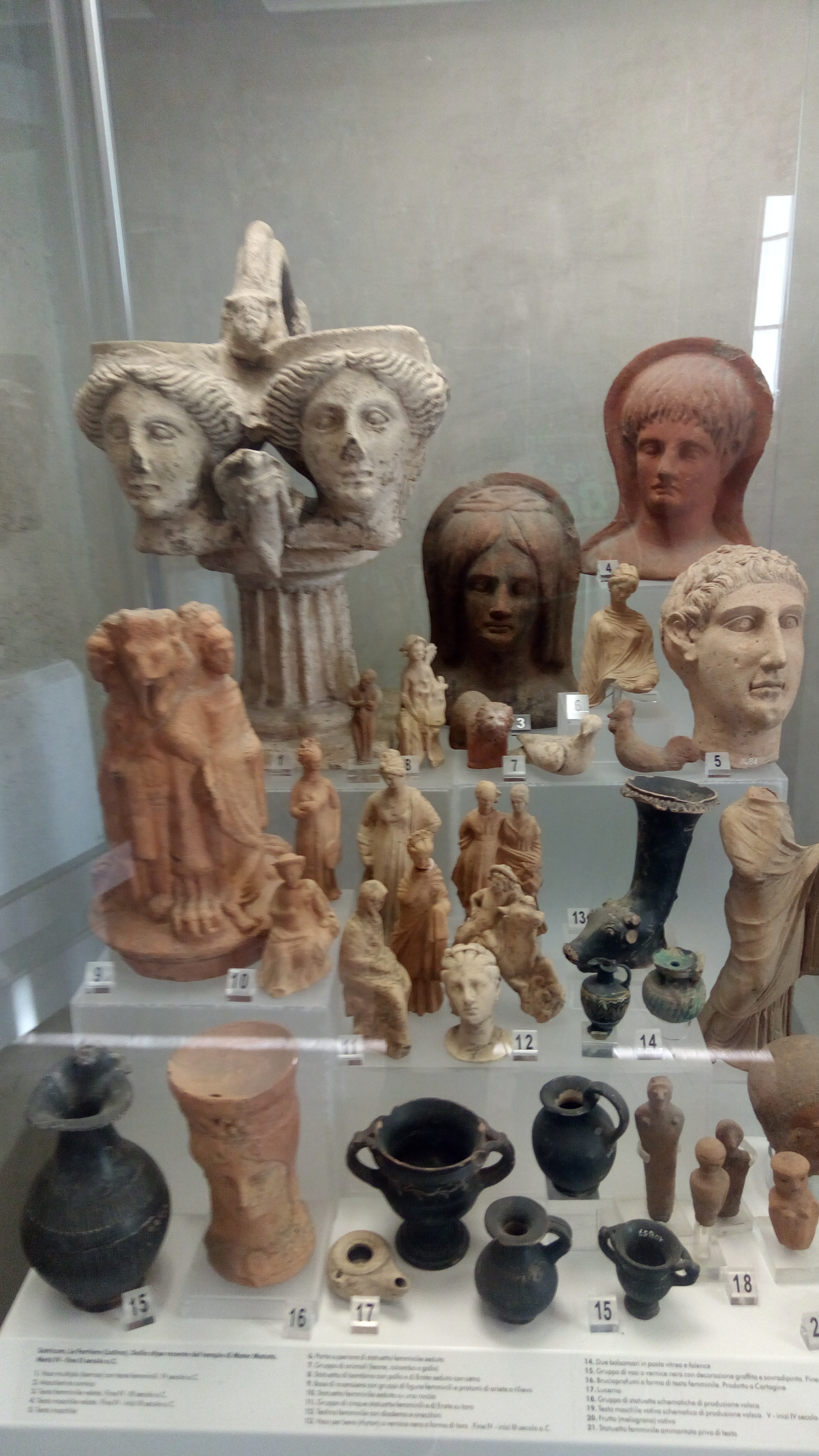
Collected finds on display at the Villa Poniatowski

Paola Pelagatti (24 November 1927 – 4 April 2026) was an Italian archaeologist and a Professor of Archaeology. Her research and conservation work significantly advanced knowledge of the historical landscapes of Sicily, particularly in Kamarina, Akrai, Naxos and Taormina.

== Education ==
Pelagatti studied for her PhD at the University of Bologna, supervised by Luciano Laurenzi. She completed her PhD in 1949. The focus of her dissertation was Spartan pottery.

== Career ==
Pelagatti began her career at the Italian Archaeological School in Athens, participating in the 1950s in the excavations of Festòs directed by Doro Levi. Pelagatti was appointed as Superintendent of Antiquities in Syracuse in 1973. She excavated and published on various archaeological sites on Sicily. She developed close ties particularly with Ragusa and the Iblean region was central to her career. In 2017 the Municipality of Ragusa awarded her honorary citizenship in recognition of her contributions.

Pelagatti was appointed Superintendent of Antiquities in Turin and Rome's Villa Giulia. She was Superintendent of Southern Etruria from 1979 to 1990, during which time she considerably expanded the Museum. She was responsible for the state purchase of Villa Poniatowski, Rome, in 1989, and years of restoration and architectural adaptation that followed.

Besides her research and fieldwork, Pelagatti fought against illegal excavations and the trade of antiquities. She produced extensive and rigorous scientific work, including monographs and hundreds of articles on archaeology, specifically Archaic Greek pottery, urban planning, and necropolises. She was among the first archaeologist in Italy to introduce stratigraphic excavation methods and the meticulous recording of finds. Her academic career included a full professorship at the University of Calabria and then at the University of Tuscia.

Pelagatti was an Honorary Fellow of the British School in Rome. She was a member of the Accademia dei Lincei, the Pontifical Roman Academy of Archaeology, and the German Archaeological Institute. Pelagatti donated her archive to the University of Rome Tor Vergato.
