= Villanova, Corse-du-Sud =

Commune in Corsica, France

Villanova
- Commune
- Location of Villanova
- Location within France Location within Corsica
- Coordinates: 41°57′37″N 8°40′06″E
- Country: France
- Region: Corsica
- Department: Corse-du-Sud
- Arrondissement: Ajaccio
- Canton: Ajaccio-5
- Intercommunality: CA Pays Ajaccien

Government
  - Mayor (2020–2026): Antoine Vincileoni
- Area^{1}: 11.25 km^{2} (4.34 sq mi)
- Elevation: 250 m (820 ft)
- Highest elevation: 787 m (2,582 ft)
- Lowest elevation: 0 m (0 ft)
- Population (2023): 402
  - Density: 35.7/km^{2} (92.5/sq mi)
- Time zone: UTC+01:00 (CET)
  - Summer (DST): UTC+02:00 (CEST)
- INSEE/Postal code: 2A351 /20167
- ^{1} French Land Register data, which excludes lakes, ponds, glaciers > 1 km^{2} (0.386 sq mi or 247 acres) and river estuaries.

Villanova (French pronunciation: [vilanɔva]; Corsican: Beddanova) is a commune in the Corse-du-Sud department of France on the island of Corsica.

== Population ==
Historical population
Year	Pop.	±% p.a.
1968	102	—
1975	127	+3.18%
1982	171	+4.34%
1990	240	+4.33%
1999	307	+2.77%
2007	355	+1.83%
2012	348	−0.40%
2017	362	+0.79%
2023	402	+1.76%
Source: INSEE

== See also ==
- Communes of the Corse-du-Sud department
