= Treasure of Villena =

Archaeological treasure trove found in 1963

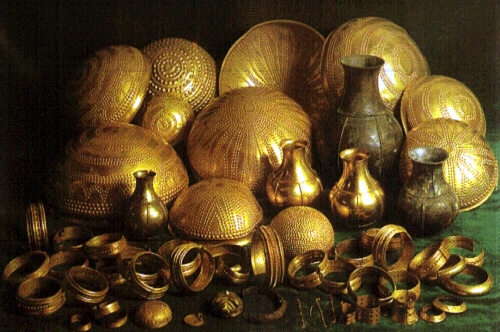
Treasure of Villena as a whole.

The Treasure of Villena (Spanish: Tesoro de Villena) is one of the greatest hoard finds of gold of the European Bronze Age. It comprises 59 objects made of gold, silver, iron and amber with a total weight of almost 10 kilograms, 9 of them of 23.5 karat gold. This makes it the most important find of prehistoric gold in the Iberian Peninsula and second in Europe, just behind that from the Royal Graves in Mycenae, Greece. Some of the iron artifacts were made of meteoric iron.

The gold pieces include eleven bowls, three bottles and 28 bracelets.

The iron pieces are the oldest found in the Iberian Peninsula and correspond to a stage in which iron was considered to be a precious metal, and so was hoarded. Archaeologists estimate the date of this trove at c. 1300-1000 BCE, within the Late Argar, Post-Argar or Bronze of Levante period.

The hoard was found in December 1963 by archaeologist José María Soler, approximately 12 kilometres (7.5 mi) from Villena, and since then has been the main attraction of Villena's Archaeological Museum. The objects had been carefully placed inside a Bronze Age vessel, similar to those found at the nearby site of Cabezo Redondo 6.5 kilometres (4 mi) away. The vessel was buried in the Rambla del Panadero, a dry riverbed, and some items were recovered loose in the gravel or several meters from the vessel, suggesting that parts of the hoard may have been displaced or lost. A monolith has been erected at the site of the discovery.

Its discovery was published in most of the Spanish media and also some abroad, mainly in France, Germany and the United States of America. It has been exhibited in Madrid, Alicante, Tokyo and Kyoto, and now there are two sets of copies of the whole treasure to be shown in exhibitions while the originals are (were) permanently conserved in an armoured showcase at Villena's Archaeological Museum, from which they were stolen on 27 August 2026.

The same type of metalwork is also found in the big Eberswalde Hoard that was discovered in Brandenburg, Germany, in 1913.

== Theft ==
On 27 August 2026 the unique gold artefacts were stolen in a smash-and-grab heist from Villena Museum where they were on display to the public. Art historians guess that, since a similar theft took 144 gold coins from the Treasure of Villanueva in the Museo Arqueológico Provincial de Badajoz in April and another one took over 200 from the Albacete Provincial Museum in July, it is linked to the rise in the price of gold. Banks no longer hold much gold, so museums become targets. The Villena thieves left behind a bracelet of meteor iron, a rare piece for archeology but worthless as raw material.

== See also ==
- Casco de Leiro
- Bronze Age Iberia
- Prehistoric art
