= Víctor Eusa Razquin =

Spanish architect

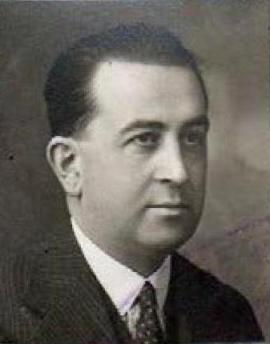
- Born: Víctor Eusa Razquin; 1894; Pamplona, Spain
- Died: 1990 (aged 95–96); Pamplona, Spain
- Occupation: architect
- Known for: architect
- Political party: Carlism

Víctor Eusa Razquin (1894–1990) was a Spanish architect, active almost exclusively in Navarre; he left his personal mark on Pamplona, which hosts numerous prestigious and monumental buildings he designed. Eusa is best known for his version of Art Deco style, though he went also through eclectic, regionalist, rationalist, expressionist and neo-classical periods, with occasional references to historicism, beaux arts, neo-mudejár or Dutch neo-plasticism styles. His best known works are the San Miguel seminary and the Piarist college, both in Pamplona. In the mid-1930s he was engaged in politics and held a seat in the Carlist wartime executive in Navarre.

== Family and youth ==
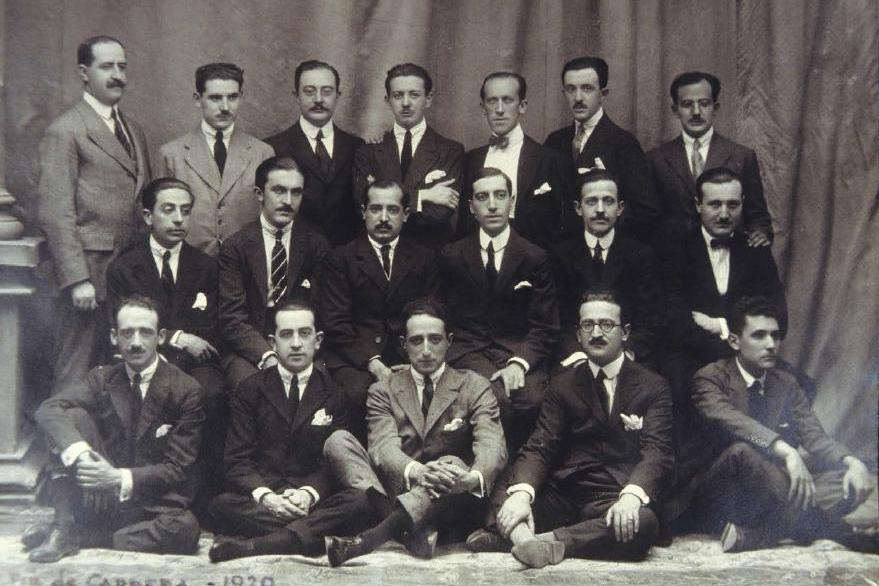
with graduation colleagues

The Eusa family has been for generations related to Valle de Egüés, a Navarrese community near Pamplona, already at the Pyrenean foothills. Víctor's great-great-grandfather and great-grandfather originated from the village of Alzuza. Also his grandfather, Martín José Eusa Ardaiz, was the native of Alzuza, but in the mid-19th century he settled in Pamplona. Víctor's father, Salustiano Eusa Goñi (1852-1919) was born already in the Navarrese capital; in 1889 he married Tomasa Razquin Ijurco (1862-1958) from Arruazu. Eusa Goñi worked as administrator of estates, held by local landholders and aristocrats; his customers were e.g. the former mayor of Pamplona José Javier Colmenares Vidarte and Condesa de Ripalda. Over time he grew to wealth; while in the early 1880s there were no possessions registered against his name, in the 1910s he was known as “rico propietario”, categorized as member of “clases pasivas” and ranked 44. on the list of key taxpayers of the city.

Víctor was born as the only son; he had two sisters, an older and a younger one. They were raised in a family considered typical for Pamplonese bourgeoisie of the late 19th century, tending to conservative outlook, adhering to traditional values, and profoundly Catholic. He initially frequented the Piarist school, later to enter Instituto General y Técnico de Pamplona. Reportedly from early childhood he demonstrated a gift for drawing, and in his teens he developed interest in design and architecture. In 1911 or 1912 Víctor moved to Madrid. During first few years he was attending courses at Universidad Central, required before commencing dedicated architectural studies. In 1914 he was admitted to Escuela Superior de Arquitectura. The curriculum lasted 6 years; throughout this period, his master was Teodoro Anasagasti. Eusa graduated in 1920, together with other later known architects José de Azpiroz and Manuel Sanchez Arcas. He then returned to Navarre seeking first design contracts.

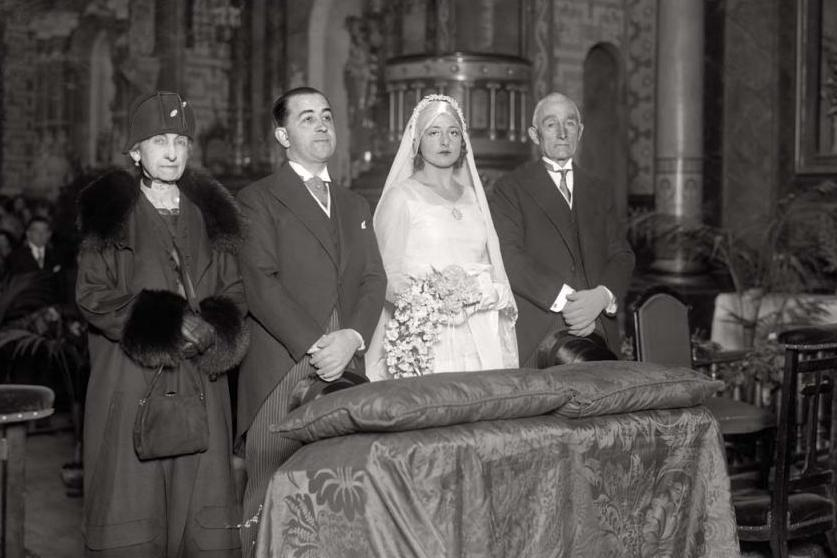
wedding

In 1929 and when already a known architect, Eusa married a girl from Pamplona, Florencia Eugui Garro (1906-2009). She was descendant to another local bourgeoisie family. Her father ran a sugar mill in the Cuatro Vientos district and later developed it into the alcohol and vinegar business; he also served as councilor in the Pamplona town hall. The marriage proved to be lasting and happy; Florencia was ingenious and resourceful, which allowed Víctor to focus on architecture. The couple lived in the Eusa family house at the central Pamplonese calle Estafeta and had 4 children, born between 1930 and 1940: Carmen, María Jesús, Isabel and Miguel Angel Eusa Eugui. None of them became a public figure. Neither Víctor's grandchildren are known nationally, though Reyes Marquiegui Eusa tried her hand as translator of juvenile literature. The Eusa branch is likely to extinguish; Víctor's son has only female descendancy.

== Works (overview) ==
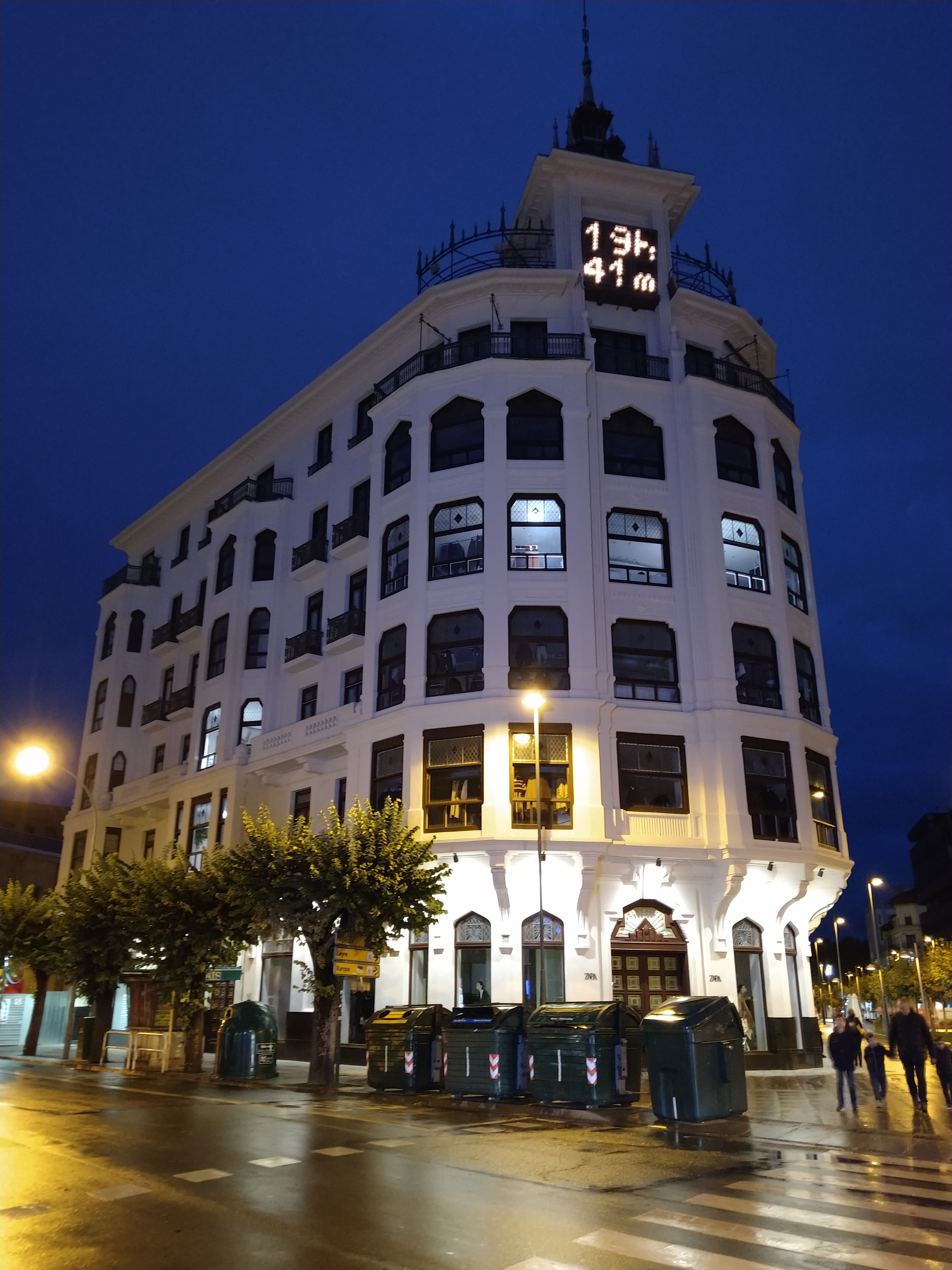
Vasco-Navarra

Eusa was professionally active between 1920 and 1973; throughout this period he was engaged in around 560 projects, some 80 to 120 every decade, though his most productive period ranged from the mid-1920s to the early-1950s. Except his juvenile drawings and few designs which for one reason or another remained on paper, almost all were completed as finished constructions; they ranged from massive buildings or entire living quarters to sepulchral family mausoleums or minor refurbishments of existing buildings. He delivered most of the projects as independent, contracted-out architect. However, during two spells he worked as self-governmental employee. In 1937-1941 Eusa acted as provisional municipal architect of the city of Pamplona; in 1945-1962 he held the post of official provincial architect of Diputación Foral de Navarra. Around 320 of his projects are related to Pamplona, many in the district known as Segundo Ensanche; he is so much associated with the city that some authors name him “el Gaudí de Pamplona”. Most of the remaining constructions are located in Navarre and undertakings beyond his native region are very few. Some 40 of his works were contracted by the Navarrese Diputación Foral, around 15 by the Pamplona town hall, around 30 by other ayuntamientos (mostly in Navarre), and around 30 by religious orders. Among Eusa's private or commercial customers the one which stands out is Caja de Ahorros de Navarra (around 60 projects); further 400 contracts were signed with other business entities, various institutions and numerous private individuals.

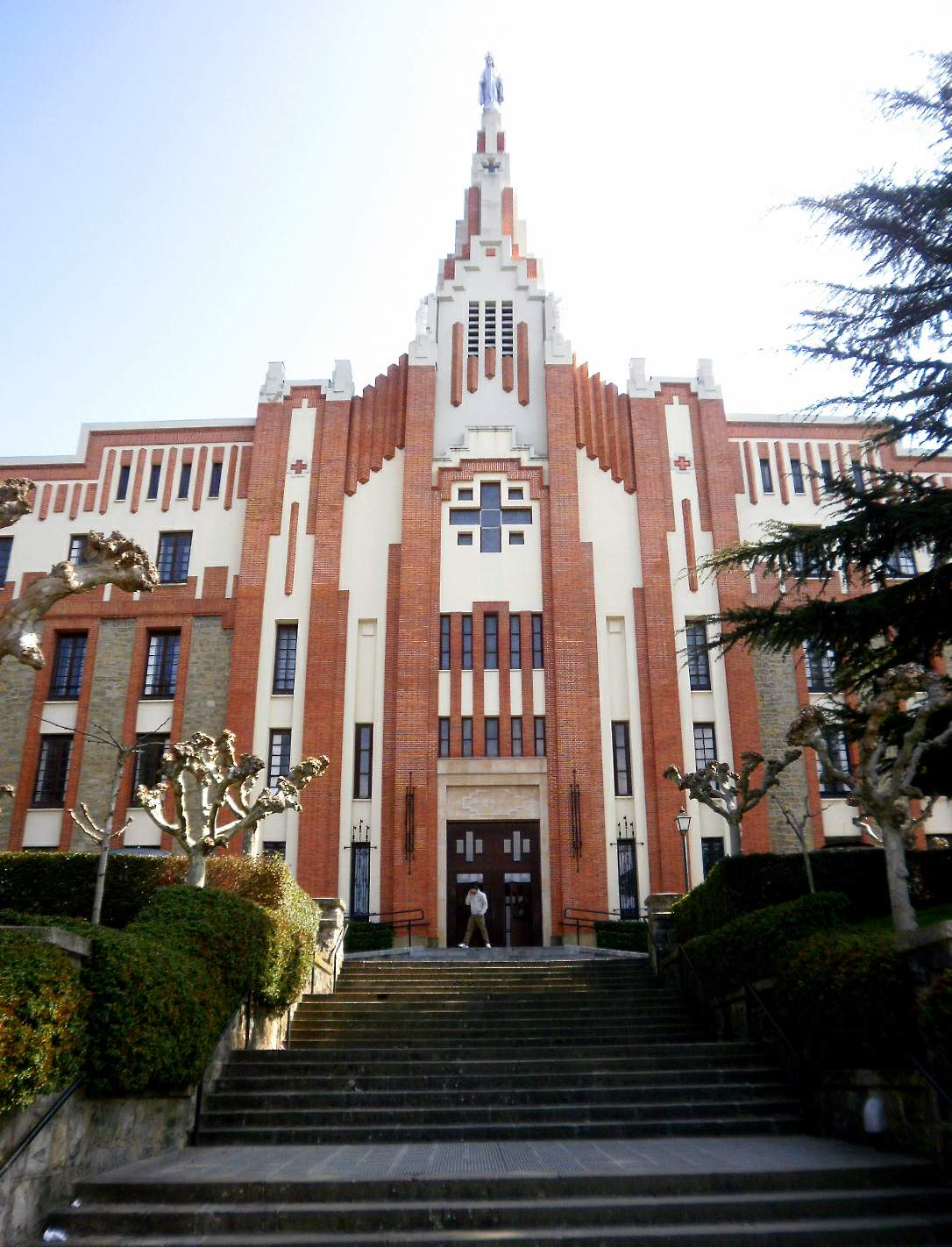
Church of La Milagrosa, Pamplona

Present-day historian divides Eusa's works into 13 categories. Some 65 projects covered multi-family residential buildings; some were grouped in entire housing developments, e.g. as council estates. Around 60 designs were related to single-family estates, ranging from modest urban houses to prestigious villas to imposing rural properties. Around 25 projects are categorized as public educational establishments, including crèches, various types of schools or entire compounds known as “colonia escolar”. Around 20 works are related to schooling institutions managed by religious orders, including colegios, gymnasiums or seminars. Constructions serving strictly religious purposes amount to some 35: they range from chapels to monuments, monasteries, churches and even hermitages. There are some 55 sepulchral projects, especially family mausoleums; they include also military pantheons, monuments, crematoria or general cemetery designs. Constructions intended for health and related services are clinics, elderly wards, sanatoria, charity establishments and hospitals (around 20). Some 30 projects designed for travel & leisure industry cover hotels, casinos, cinemas, tennis clubs, concert halls or tourist shelters. Administrative and other institutional projects include municipal houses, town halls and exposition halls (around 15). Contracts with banks and other financial institutions amount to around 75, from headquarters of major insurance or bank companies to branch offices. Other commercial projects cover bars, workshops, garages, service stations, retail or service premises (around 20). Finally, general urban projects include parks, gardens, bus stations, plazas, viewpoints, monuments, a tunnel and a bridge.

== Major works ==
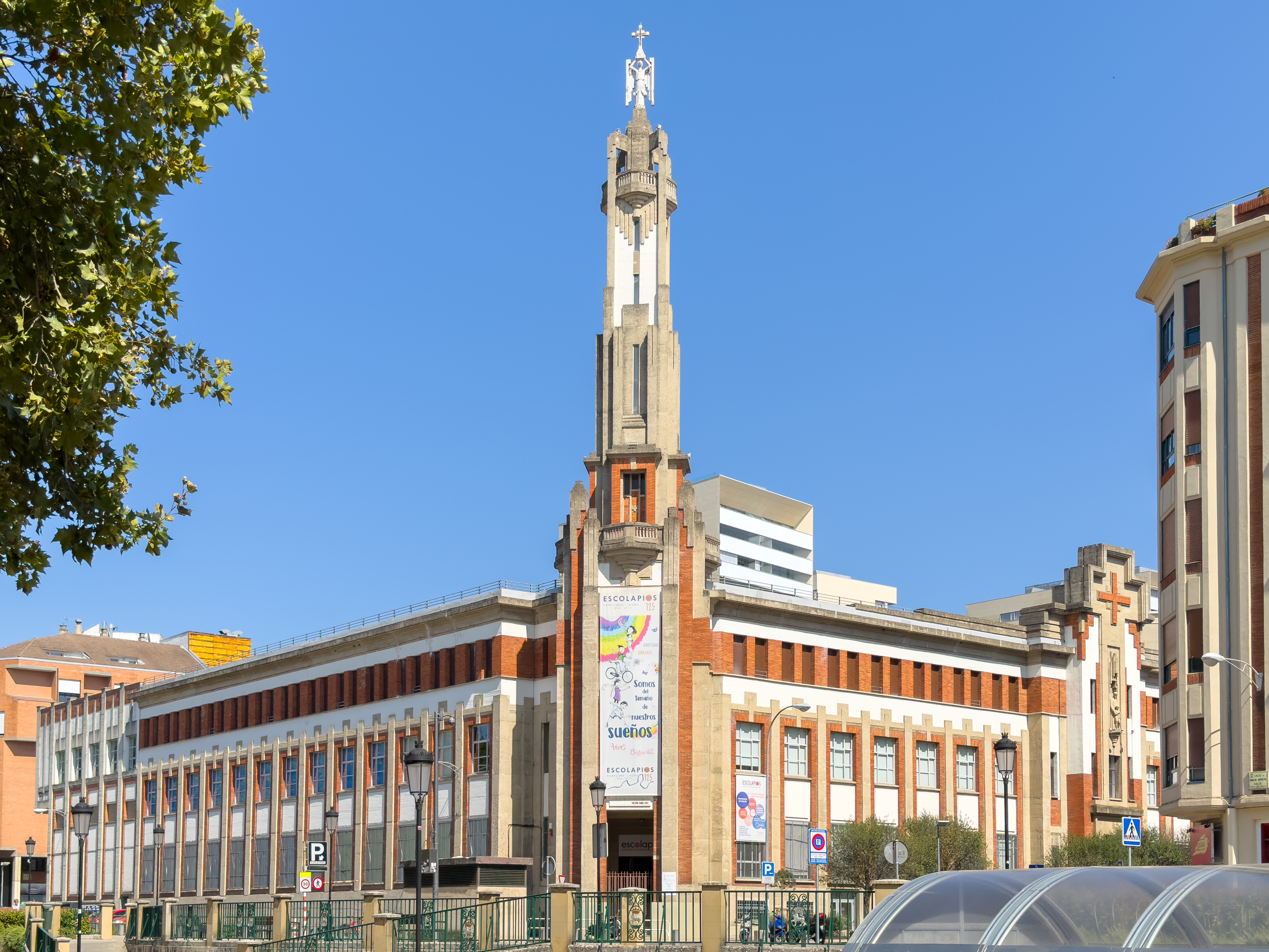
Piarist college

Chronologically the first major project was headquarters of the insurance company La Vasco Navarra (1924). Along few large residential villas the same year Eusa produced the plan of the Hijas de María Immaculada monastery. Puente de San Jorge in Alcoy turned out to be the only bridge he designed (1926). Casa de Misericordia was the first monumental, multi-volume establishment, designed with no restraints related to size. It included a number of in-built facilities, like a large chapel (1927). Residential villa for Eguinoa brothers demonstrated ingenuity embodied in mid-size construction (1928). Eusa returned to religious theme with the church of Padres Paúles, known as La Milagrosa (1928). Colegio de los PP. Escolapios, a 3-storey enormous multi-wing building, was Eusa's most ambitious project so far and is one of his most iconic works (1928). Basilica of Nuestra Señora del Puy in Estella turned an essay in geometry (1929), while residential multi-dwellings at Plaza Príncipe de Viana marked his urbanistic capacity (1930). A 7-storey edifice hosting Casino Eslava, with meticulously designed interior, was Eusa's last major work of the monarchy (1931).

The first project of the Republican era was perhaps Eusa's most important work, usually listed first among his designs: Seminario Conciliar de San Miguel (1931). Planned on massive scale for the plot of 98,000 sq.m., with numerous wings and internal yards, it was designed as a Pamplona landmark. Its giant cross on the front facade spoke volumes at the time when newly adopted law prohibited presence of religious symbols in public space. Residential multi-apartment buildings at calle García Castañón, chalé de Erroz villa and a tennis club followed (1933). Eusa returned to major projects with schooling establishments in Zudaire and Fuenterrabia (1933), and then with crèche of San Manuel in Tafalla, designed with adjacent church. (1933). A group of twelve 5-storey buildings hosting 400 flats is his most notable work in large-scale urbanistic design (1933). The last project completed before the war was the Clinic of San Juan de Dios, another complex, large scale construction (1935).

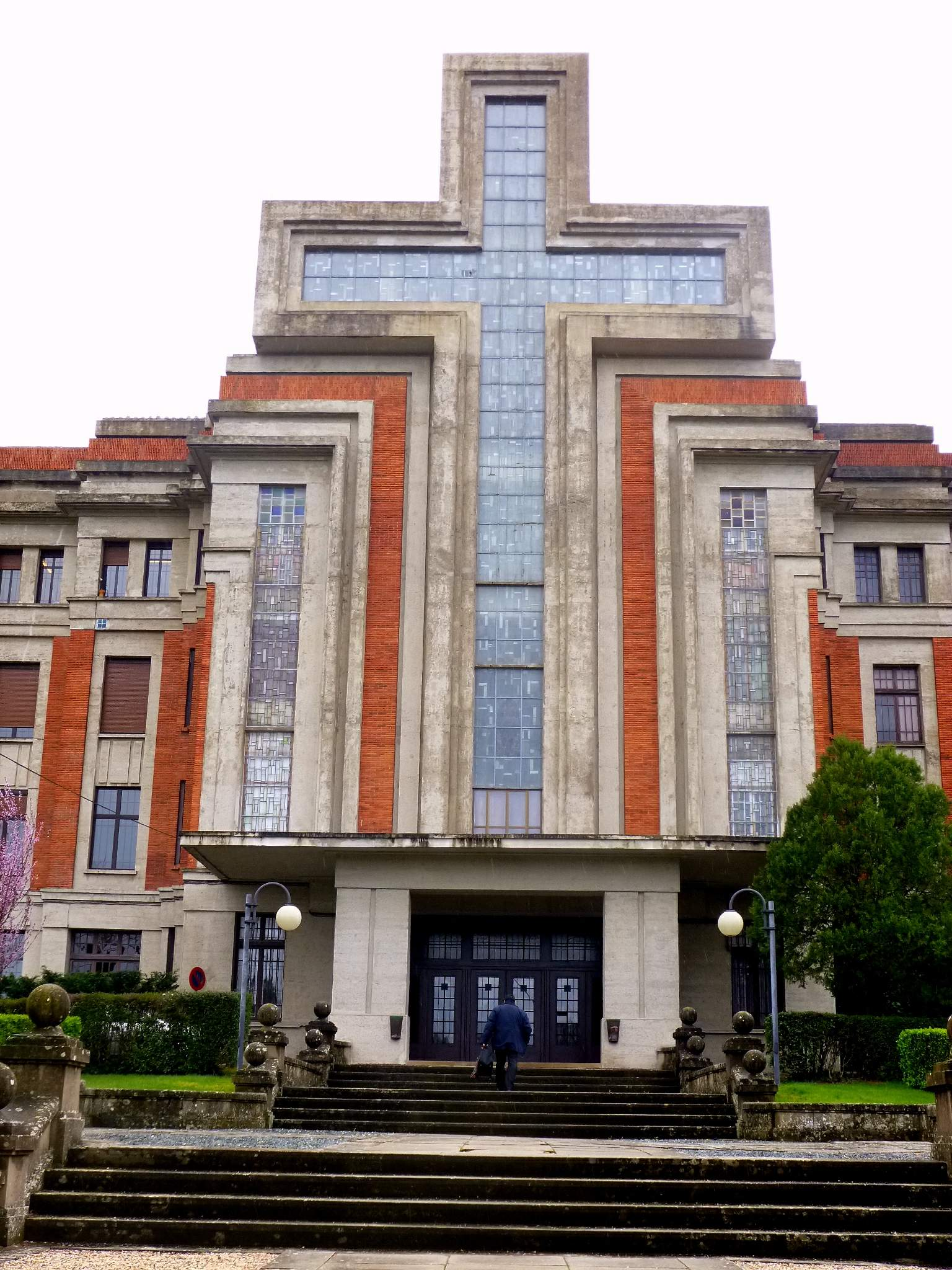
San Miguel seminary

First arrangements of the Francoist period are exercises in urbanism: Parque de Media Luna (1937), Plaza de la Cruz, war cemetery and the Taconera gardens (1938). Religious projects of Convento de las Esclavas and Colegio de Sagrado Corazón (1939) are compact compared to earlier projects. Mausoleum to fallen Italian soldiers, planned for Zaragoza, was built 3 years later with major changes introduced (1940). In 1940-1941 Eusa joined forces with José Yárnoz to design Monumento a los Caidos, a monumental construction which jointly with re-arrangement of the quarter was intended as Pamplona's landmark. Following a number of refurbishment projects new masterpiece works were Casa Consistorial in Olite (1945), the Coliseo theatre in Eibar (1949), and the headquarters of the insurance company Aurora, a 10-storey corner building (1949). Eusa's last major work is Colegio Santa María la Real, contracted by the Marists (1951). A number of other lesser projects followed, e.g. numerous multi-dwellings, refurbishments or branch offices. Some monumental designs, like Ego Sum Veritas church, remained on paper.

== Styles and techniques ==
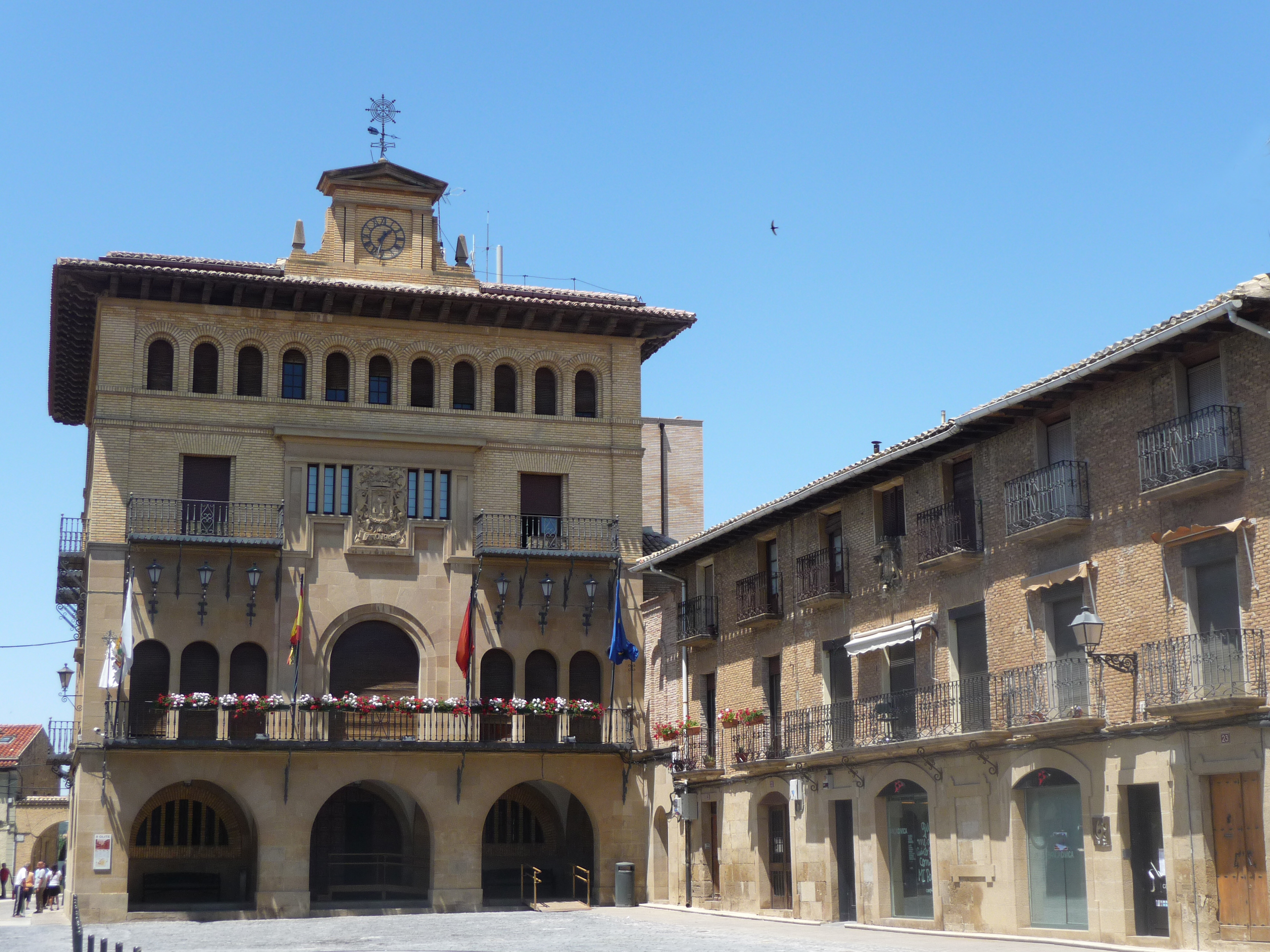
Olite town hall

During his formative years Eusa was influenced by 3 grand architects: Durand, Guadet and Wagner; some add his direct master, Anasagasti. Later on he absorbed styles advanced by the Vienna secession, the Paris art deco and the Dutch Amsterdam school. His early designs are referred to as eclecticism or historicist eclecticism, with interior of Casino Gran Kursaal in Donostia quoted as the key sample. The following phase is by some categorized as regionalism, exemplified by villas in II Ensanche. Others also admit brief regionalist leaning, but categorize it as “episodes” falling on the early 1930s and prefer to quote colonias escolares in Zudaire and Fuenterrabia (1933), works classified by others rather as marked by “romanticismo”. The mid-1920s is viewed as the period of prevailing secessionist influence of the Vienna branch, marking the Immaculada convent, Casa de Misericordia or the Alcoy bridge. A competitive approach places the Alcoy construction within the current defined as “French rationalism”, as demonstrated also by the Paulist college and church.

The late 1920s and the early 1930s produced full esthetic maturity embodied in the trademark Eusa's style of art déco, at times referred to as “déco expressionism” or simply as “expresionismo”. Its best achievements are the Paules convent, the Escolapios college, the El Puy basilica, the Eslava casino and above all, the San Miguel seminary. Afterwards and well into the late 1930s Eusa underwent a “rationalist evolution”, demonstrated by utilitarian turn to residential buildings in the Pamplonese II Ensanche and in the San Juan clinic. In the 1940s this phase gave way to urbanism, marked by parks, gardens, cemeteries and other public zones, including monuments. This is also when Eusa embraced classicism or “estilo clásico nacional”; its most powerful demonstration is Monumento a los Caidos. Later Eusa's works, dated at the late 1950s and later, are described as constructions marked by functional design and decreasing stylistic features. Apart from the above major categorizations, other style references sporadically applied to his architecture are symbolism, medieval historicism, Dutch neoplasticism, beaux arts, “simplismo” and the neomudejár style.

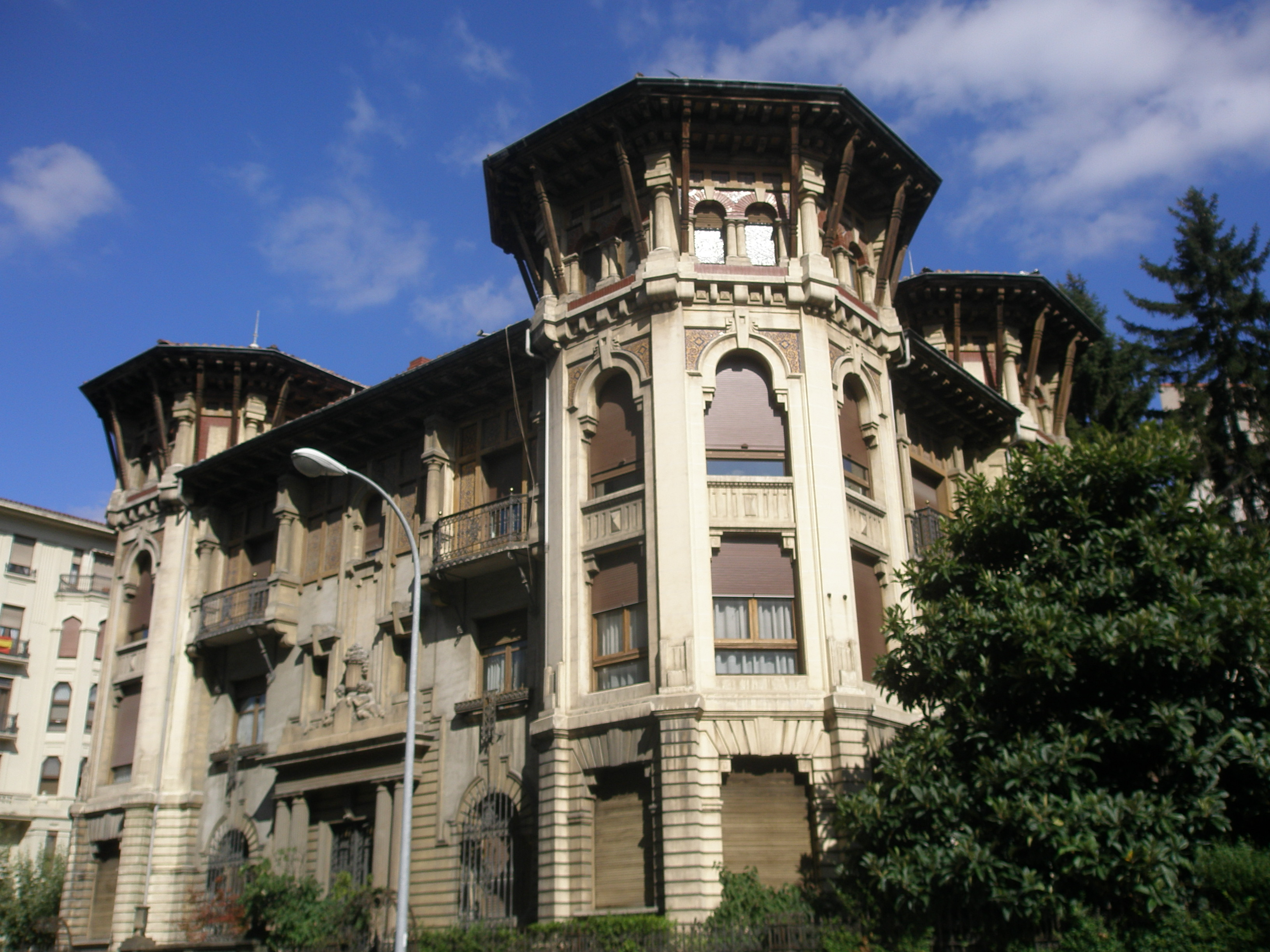
Casa Goicoechea

In terms of materials Eusa is considered the master of reinforced concrete. He was among the first Spanish architects who realized its flexibility and enormous potential compared to traditional techniques; its usage was symbolically demonstrated by enormous cross at the San Miguel facade. Another preferred material was bricks, especially used jointly with concrete; this combination is thought to be related to influence of the Dutch architectural modernism. Steel is used mostly for decorative and auxiliary roles, like railings and bannisters. In terms of interior design scholars note that Eusa was among architects who mastered electric lighting, applied in different and ingenious ways. The result is not only enhanced functionality but also the look of his buildings after dark, e.g. the landmark role of Casino Eslava in the centre of Pamplona, patios and internal yards of Casa de Misericordia, or cross of San Miguel, originally visible for tens of kilometers in the countryside north-east of the city.

== Politics: Carlist episode ==
Carlist standard

Eusa's ancestors and distant relatives were loosely related to liberalism, though he was brought up in the conservative, Catholic family. Until mid-age he was not active in politics. However, during local elections of April 1931 he joined a local coalition list named “candidatura antirrevolucionaria”. It was dominated by Traditionalists from the Jaimista current, with few Integrist, liberal and independent candidates; Eusa was among the independents. The list proved hugely successful and Eusa was easily voted into the town hall. However, Basque nationalists lodged a protest claiming irregularities. The claim was examined already by the makeshift, republican authorities, which decided to re-run the entire Pamplonese election process. The right-wing coalition was rebuilt as “candidatura católico-fuerista”, but for reasons which are not clear, Eusa was not on the list.

During works on Casa de Misericordia Eusa frequently interfaced with its administrator, Blas Inza Cabasés, a Carlist militant. Historians speculate that it was because of him that Eusa started to approach Carlism. The decisive moment was assassination of his friend and fellow architect Ezequiel Lorca, who in 1934 was killed by a socialist militant. From this moment Eusa underwent political radicalization and some time afterwards joined Carlist organization in Pamplona and facilitated its operations, e.g. by enabling access to premises in some buildings. According to his own testimony in the spring of 1936 he represented the movement during conspiracy talks with general Mola, though documents do not confirm this. He might have also left some of his personal assets, among them a car, at the disposal of the plotters. During first days of the coup the Navarrese Carlists formed Junta Central Carlista de Guerra de Navarra, their regional wartime executive; within this structure Eusa took seat as the representative of Pamplona. He also entered Inspección de Requeté and Régimen de Gobernación, two sub-bodies of unclear purpose. Starting September he was also formally incorporated into requeté as jefe técnico of 1. compañía de zapadores.

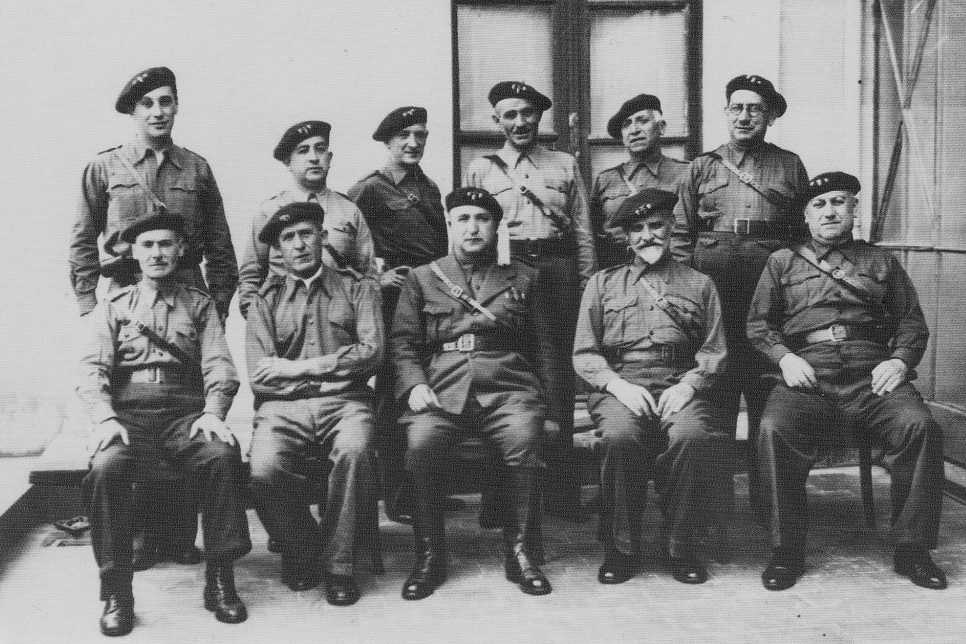
Eusa in Junta Central Carlista

There is little known of Eusa's engagement in Carlist structures in late 1936 and early 1937; some claim he was co-responsible for arrests carried out in Navarre and decided the fate of detainees. His architectural work ceased almost entirely. The exception was a giant altar, drafted probably in the fall of 1936; the construction was to be erected at the Madrid Puerta del Sol plaza, as the city was expected to be soon taken by the Nationalists. It is known that in the spring of 1937 Eusa was taking part in sittings of the Navarrese junta when discussing the threat of forced amalgamation into a state party; details of the position he took are not clear. In May 1937 the new Pamplona ayuntamiento performed purges among its employees; the municipal architect Serapio Esparza lost his job and as temporary stopgap measure, Eusa was appointed “arquitecto municipal interino”. From this moment onwards there is no information available on any further Eusa's engagements in Carlist structures, though Carlist connections were related to his further professional career.

== Footnotes ==
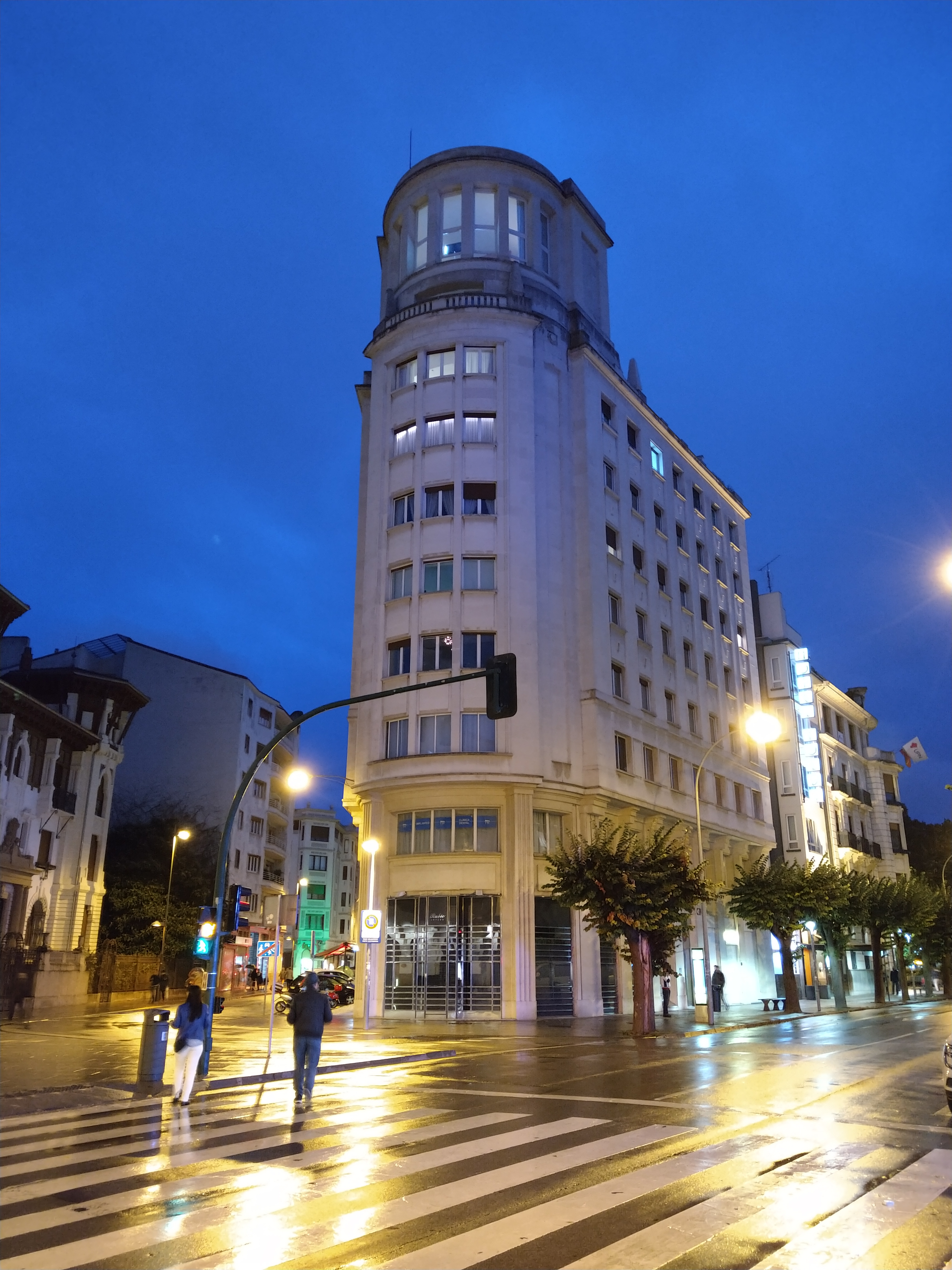
Aurora office building
