= José Mendive =

Spanish Jesuit theologian (1836–1906)

- Born: José Mendive y Suescun; 11 February 1836; Liédena, Navarre, Spain
- Died: 13 March 1906 (aged 70); Santander, Spain
- Occupations: Jesuit, philosopher, theologian

José Mendive y Suescun (11 February 1836 – 13 March 1906) was a Spanish Jesuit, philosopher and theologian.

== Biography ==
Born in Liédena, Navarre, on 11 February 1836, Mendive studied at tha Seminary of Pamplona. He joined the Society of Jesus and has been described as a convinced Carlist. He was the author of a general treatise on metaphysics, published in Valladolid in 1883. From 1896 his eyesight deteriorated, and so he dedicated himself to hearing confessions in Burgos and Santander. He died in Santander on 13 March 1906.

Mendive wrote numerous works on philosophy and some on theology. Between 1886 and 1888, he translated the various volumes of his Elementos of philosophy into Latin for use in seminaries, publishing them in six volumes under the title Institutiones Philosophiae Scholasticae ad mentem Divi Thomae ac Suarezii. This work served as the standard philosophy manual at the Pontifical Seminary of Comillas and later at Comillas Pontifical University during its early years.

== Works ==
According to the catalogue of the Biblioteca Nacional de España,, Mendive's books include:

- Elementos de Ontología (Valladolid, 1882)
- Elementos de Cosmología (Valladolid, 1882)
- Elementos de Psicología (Valladolid, 1883)
- Elementos de Lógica (Valladolid, 1883)
- La Religión Católica vindicada de las imposturas racionalistas, 2 vols. (Madrid, 1883)
- Elementos de Teodicea (Valladolid, 1883, 1st ed.; Valladolid, 1887, 2nd ed.)
- Elementos de Ética General (Valladolid, 1884, 1st ed.; Valladolid, 1890)
- Elementos de Derecho Natural (Valladolid, 1884)
- Institutiones Philosophiae Scholasticae ad mentem Divi Thomae ac Suarezii, 6 vols. (Valladolid, 1886–1888, 1st ed.; Valladolid, 1908, 2nd ed.)
- Institutiones Theologiae Dogmatico-Scholasticae, 5 vols. (Valladolid, 1895)
