= Shelter of Cervantes =

- Refugi de Cervantes
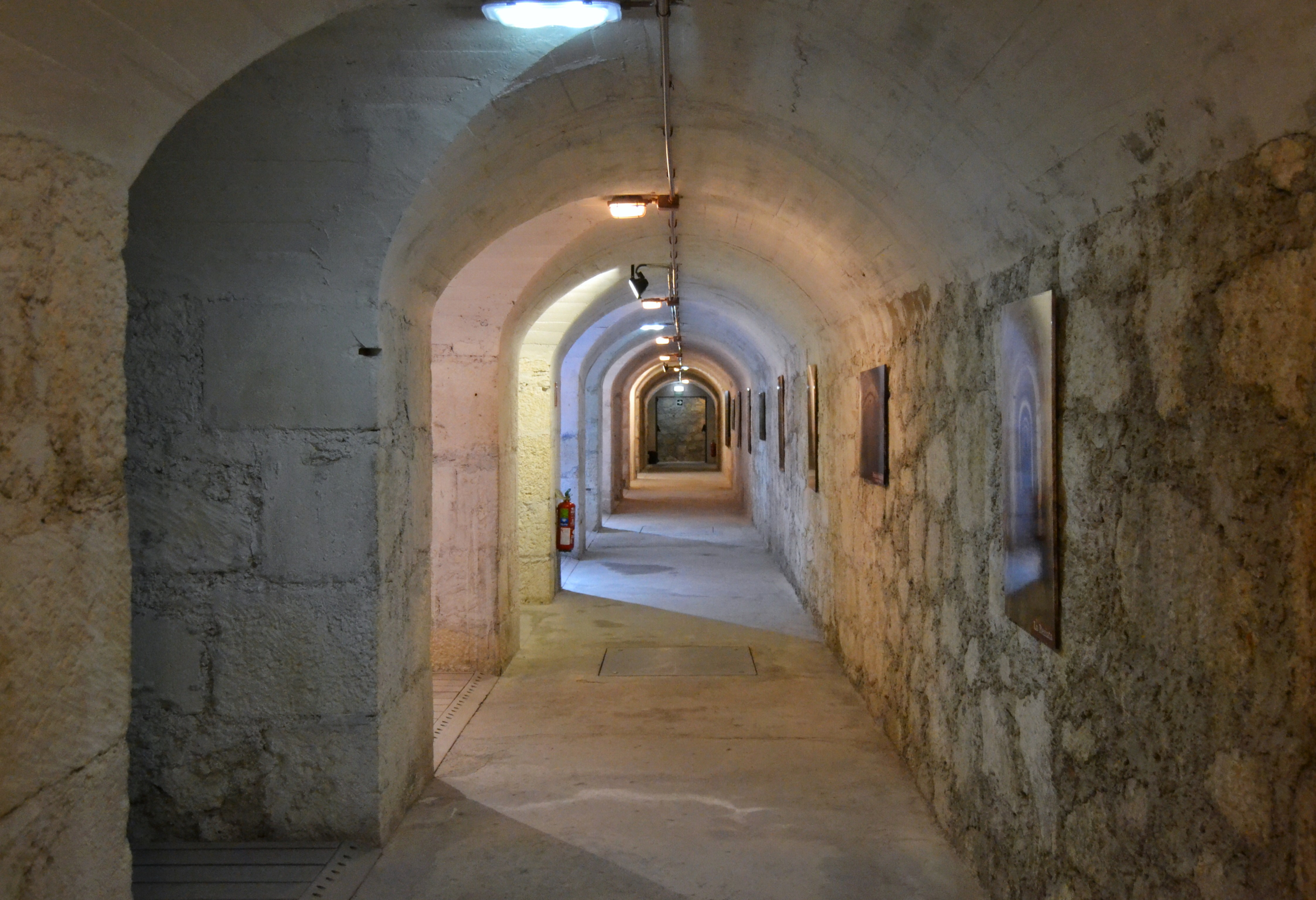
- Established: 1938
- Location: Calle els Alçamora nº 1 - Alcoy (Alicante), Spain
- Coordinates: 38°41′43″N 0°28′48″W
- Type: Historical, Militar
- Website: Website of Cervantes Shelter

The Shelter of Cervantes is an air raid shelter built during the Spanish Civil War, located next to the Parque de Cervantes (Cervantes Park) in the city of Alcoy (Alicante), Valencian Community, Spain. It was refurbished and opened to the public on April 12, 2006.

== History ==
During the Spanish Civil War, more than 25 shelters were built throughout the city of Alcoy to protect citizens from bombing raids carried out by aircraft Savoia SM 79 from the Italian Legionary Air Force, which bombarded Alcoy on several occasions from September 20th 1938 until January 11th, 1939.

The underground shelter had a capacity of 1,166 people and measures more than 100 meters in length. It is composed of eight galleries, which could be accessed via two corridors. Its surface area is 292 square metres. It also had four toilets or latrines, two washbasins, and a first aid room.

The access to the shelter is through a long corridor where original signage reading "es peligroso permanecer aqui" (Spanish: "it is dangerous to stay here") can be seen. It was anticipated that the shelter could be damaged by a bomb shock wave.

In 2006, the shelter was turned into a museum, with each gallery focused on a specific topic. The museum recreates data and aerial photographs from attacks by the Italian bombers. The exhibition has an interactive screen with military objects and a video projection with testimonies of people who lived through the bombing of the city.
