= Firefighters Museum of Alcoy =

Museum in Spain

- Museo de Bomberos del Consorcio Provincial de Alicante
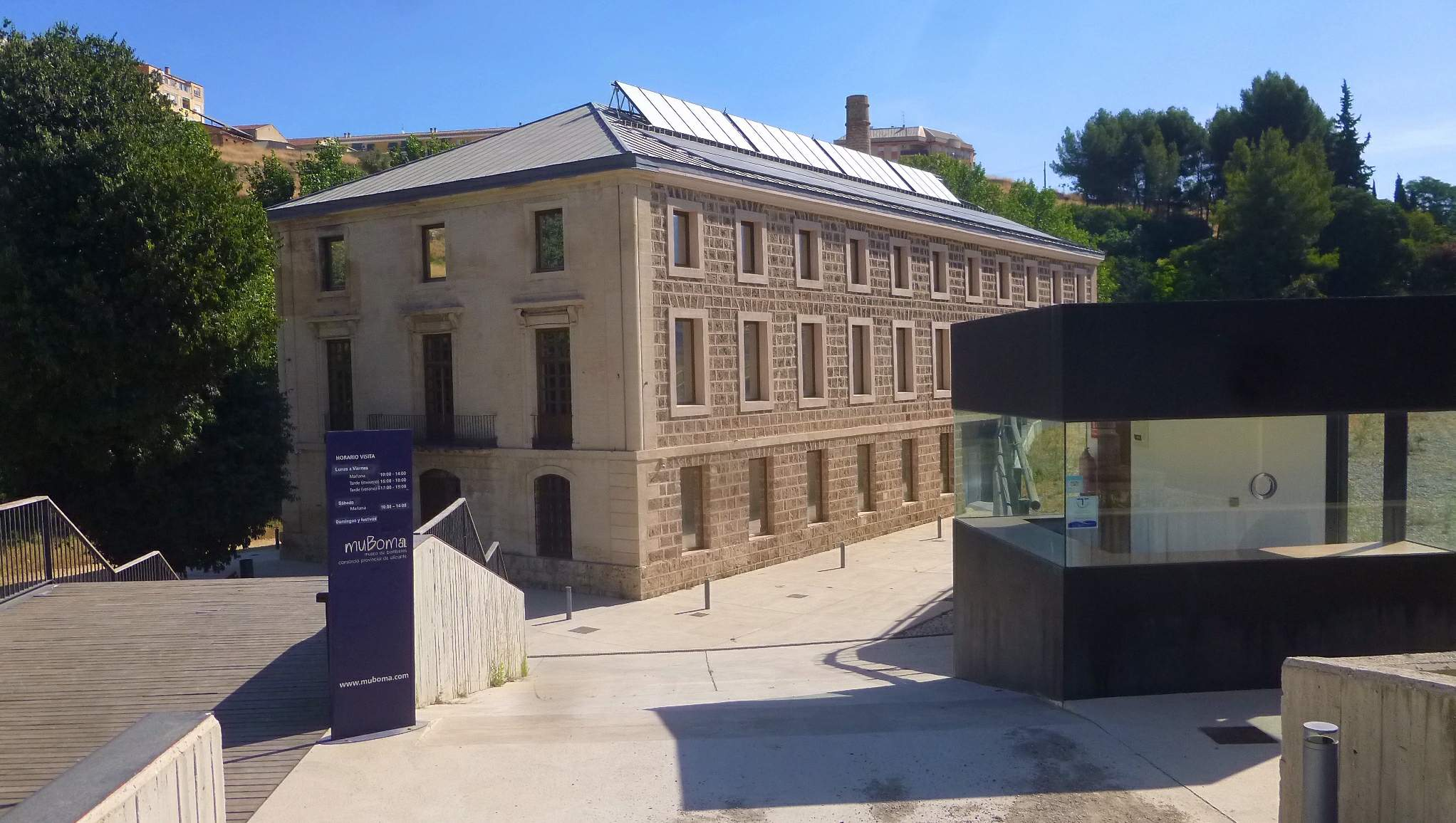
- Established: 2011
- Location: Calle Alcassares 64 - Alcoy (Alicante), Spain
- Coordinates: 38°42′10″N 0°28′19″W
- Website: Website of the Firefighters Museum of Alcoy

The Firefighters Museum of Alcoy (MUBOMA), whose official name is Firefighters Museum of the Provincial Consortium of Alicante, is a museum located in Alcoy (Alicante), Valencian Community, Spain.

== Building ==
The museum is in the popularly known as Factory of Plugs, an industrial building re-turned into museum for cultural use. The building is raised in cut stone close to the Serpis river.

The building is of linear plant with a ground floor and two heights, with a structure constructed entirely with wood of pine. The front adopts certain neoclassical elements. The chimney is later and is constructed in brick with shaft of conical form.

== Museum ==
The museum contains a collection of tools and resources that have allowed the development of this profession. The museum was opened to the public in July 2011.

The museum shows to the visitor the heritage that the different fire stations of the province of Alicante have been hoarding with the time. The museum understands a collection of the first vehicles used in the labors of extinction, as well as all kinds of objects, equipments and apparel, definitively the history of the firefighters in the province of Alicante turned into museum collection.
