= Moors and Christians of Alcoy =

Festival in Spain

Moors and Christians of Alcoy Moros y Cristianos of Alcoy Moros i Cristians d'Alcoi
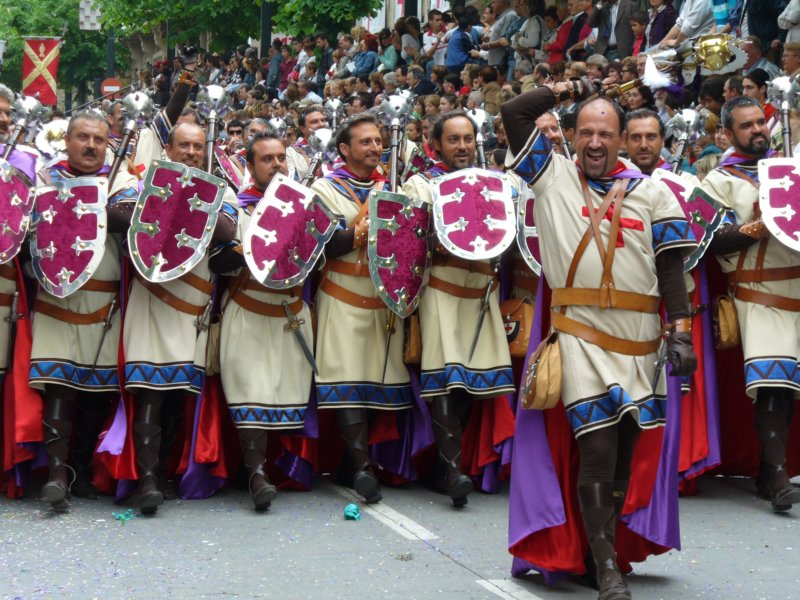
- Moors and Christians Esquadra
- Begins: 21 April; 19,30 p.m. (noon)
- Ends: 24 April; 12 a.m. (midnight)
- Frequency: Annual
- Locations: Alcoi, Spain

Fiesta of International Tourist Interest
- Designated: 1980

The Moors and Christians of Alcoy (in Valencian Moros i Cristians d'Alcoi, in Spanish Moros y Cristianos de Alcoy) is a popular festival which takes place in the city of Alcoy in the Spanish Province of Alicante, including the representation of a historic conflict between Muslims and Christians. The festival is held on 18-20 April each year, with Saint George being commemorated on 23 April.

== History ==
The Moors and Christians Festival of Alcoy, in honor of St George was declared of International Tourist Interest in 1980 and is the origin for all the Moors and Christians festivals celebrated in the Valencian Community.

=== Background to the medieval conflict ===
In 1276, different historical figures related to the various Muslim uprisings taking place in the region led to Saint George being recognized as the patron of Alcoy, who is attributed to the intervention in a battle to defend the population who were under attack by the Muslims. It was in this battle when the Muslim leader Al-Azraq is reputed to have been killed. The place where the battle took part is now called The Ravine of the Battle in Spanish Barranco de la Batalla.

=== Background to celebration of St George ===
Today it is accepted that the Moors and Christians festivities has a marked and established three-day structure, but it is generally not known what the evolution of a festivities has been, which was originated in a strictly religious commemoration.

Tradition marks the date of 23 April 1276 as the beginning of the patronage of St. George for Alcoy, for his intervention in the defence of Alcoy from the Muslim attack of Al-Azraq.

Soon there was a chapel dedicated to the Saint, which is already known shortly after 1300, in fact, there are documents of 1317 because it was perpetual vowed to honor him in his festivity.

Thus, the current structure of three days, dedicated the first one to the Entradas or parade, the second to the religious festivity and the third to the Alardo, culminating with the appearance of San Jorge, begins to be gestating taking as axis the festivity of San Jorge, the day 23 of April.

Initially, the documents speak of a religious celebration, basically, but already in 1412, there is information about some payments made for the celebration of the religious festivity. However, it was at the beginning of the 16th century when the Town Hall decided to give more importance to the celebration, including profane acts. In this aspect, in 1552 an arcabucería contest was organized where the local militias took part, and the logical variants will originate later the Alardo, that nowadays corresponds to the celebrations of the third day of the festivities when the actual battle take part.

In 1668, Vicente Carbonell in his work "Célebre Centuria" speaks about two companies: one of Christians Moors and the other of Catholic Christians, which originated the current division of Moorish and Christian sides.

With the victory of Philip V in the War of Succession in 1714, the city of Alcoy was treated as an enemy for having been a supporter of the Archduke Charles, and it will not be until 1741 when the festivities were again celebrated. Dated on the same year, the Chronicle of Father Picher, said that the eve of the Saint, the 22nd of April, the captains and military officers made a "colorful walk"; this walk or parade is the one that with the passage of time will give rise to the entradas, both Christian and Moorish. Also referred to the same year 1741 and according to Father Picher, for the following day of the Saint, day 24, an artificial castle was built up, called Aduar del Puche. It also says that in the morning, after an embassy, the Moors took the castle, but that in the afternoon, using also an ambassador, the Christians surrendered the castle by force of arms.

This corresponds practically to the current structure of the day of the "Alardo", although in order for it to be complete the appearance of Saint George on the battlements of the castle is missing. However, in 1743, always according to Fr. Picher, the apparition of the Saint over the walls of the Villa was added to the narrative.

In the middle of the 18th century, the elements that form festivities were determined, and with the logical evolution of more than 250 years, the current structure of the Moors and Christians Festival of Alcoy was established. Shortly afterward, at the end of the 18th century, the "filaes" (troupes in English) appeared, some of which have survived to the present day. Practically at the beginning of the 20th century thirteen Moorish "filaes" were already structured, being completed in the last quarter of that century, with a fourteenth "filà". In the Christian side, although some of the initial "filaes" remain, it has had many more changes and the current fourteen '"filaes" were not settled until the 1960s.

=== 21st century ===
The festival centres on the relics of St George which are held at Valencia Cathedral; they are carried in a procession around Alcoy, accompanied by musicians and marchers.

== Museum ==
The Museu Alcoià de la Festa MAF (English: Museum of the Moors and Christians of Alcoy) in Alcoy, is a museum dedicated entirely to the festival of the Moros y Cristianos of Alcoy, where the visitors can experience all the details, aspects and feelings surrounding this international festival.

== See also ==
- Museu Alcoià de la Festa
- Moros y Cristianos
