= Seminary of Pamplona =

Coordinates: 42.8135°N 1.6292°W

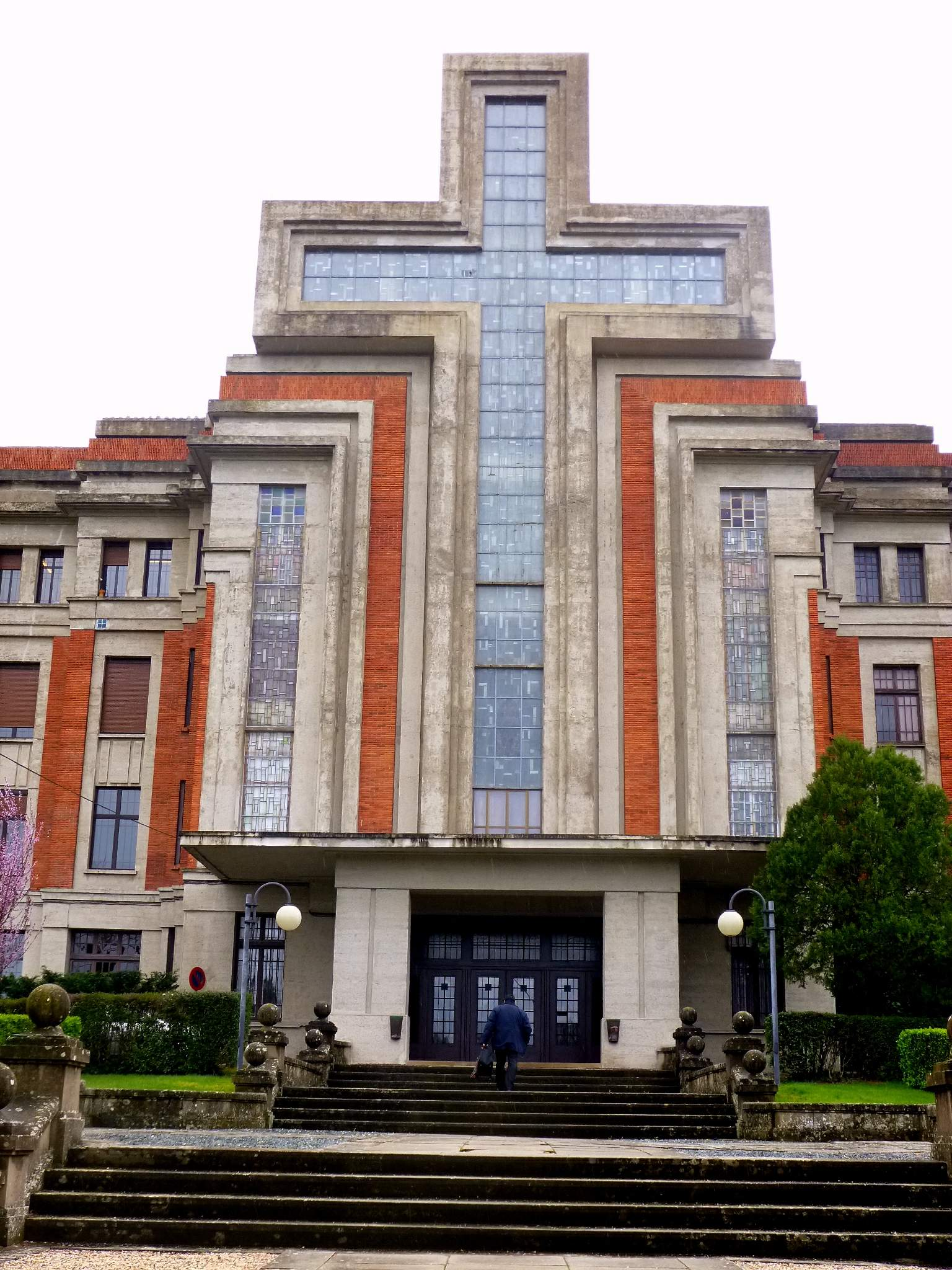
- Interactive map of the Seminary of Pamplona area
- Alternative names: Seminario Conciliar de San Miguel

General information
- Location: Pamplona
- Inaugurated: 1931

Height
- Architectural: Expressionist architecture

Design and construction
- Architect: Víctor Eusa Razquin

The Seminary of Pamplona (in Spanish, Seminario Conciliar de San Miguel) is the catholic seminary of that city, opened in 1931 and designed by the architect Víctor Eusa Razquin.

It is a work from the most expressionist period in Eusa, characterized, as in the Church of La Milagrosa, by the combination of white concrete and red brick, a style that has been defined as déco-expressionism or geometric expressionism.

The feature that stands out in the building is the colossal cross that constitutes the main façade, which has also been defined as futurist. It is said to have been inspired by fellow expressionist Spanish architect Casto Fernandez-Shaw, who projected a cathedral / skyscraper building named "Cruz soñada" (dreamt cross) that was never built.
