= Jesuset del Miracle =

Procession commemorating a 1568 theft

Each year on 31 January, the people of Alcoy, Spain hold a solemn procession, the Procession of the Miraculous Baby Jesus (Valencian: Jesuset del Miracle [dʒezuˈzed del miˈɾakle]), commemorating the theft of liturgical vessels that took place in 1568.

== History ==
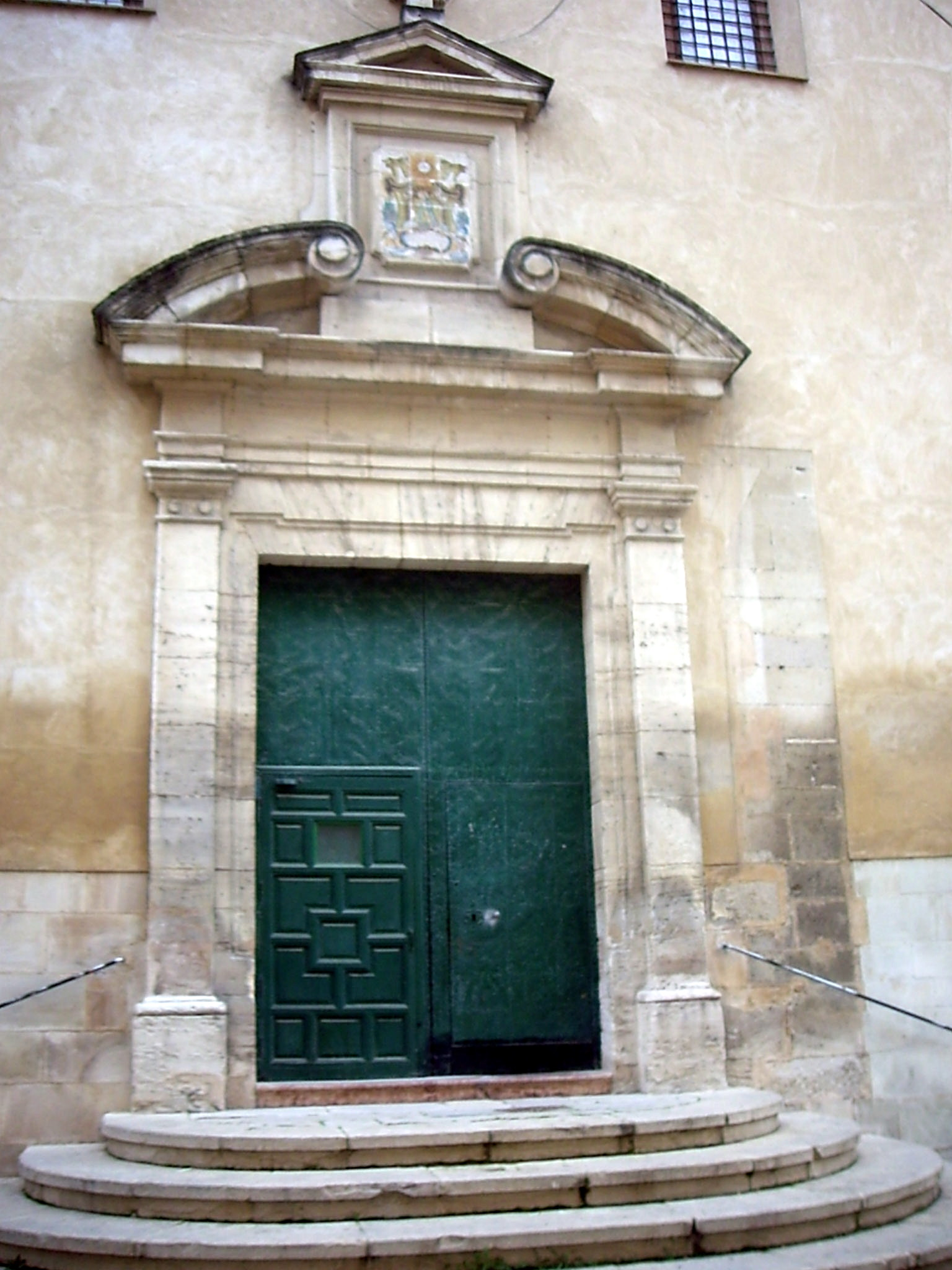
Side door of the Convent of the Holy Sepulchre, Alcoy

On 29 January 1568 John Meadows (Joan Prats), a cloth shearer, entered his local church and stole a silver ciborium containing forty pieces of sacramental bread, a pyx and a reliquary. He went back to his house and hid the items under a pile of rocks beneath the stairs that led from the stable to the inhabited rooms of his house. Later, after eating all the sacramental bread he broke open the reliquary took out the bag containing the relics he put them all the stolen items in an empty chest. He became worried that the items would be easily found so he wrapped the reliquary and the ciborium in a cloth and buried them in the stables.

The next day the priest discovered that the church had been robbed and rang the church bells. A reward of thirty pounds was offered to whoever recovered the stolen items and discovered who was the thief. The town’s Justice of the Peace informed the Viceroy of the Hue and cry. A search was made of the area even extending as far as Xàtiva and Gandia, rumour spread that the thief was still in Alcoy and people began to suspect Meadows of the crime. That same day the Justice of the Peace make a cursory inspection of Meadows' house. Even though he did not find anything a few hours later he arrested Meadows because of the excited nature of the crowd.

At midday on 31 January John Stevens (Joan Esteve), a farm labourer, received the magistrate’s permission to search Meadows’ house. He quickly found a dish that was recognized by the priest. Soon afterwards, Stevens uncovered the cloth that was wrapped around the other objects.

Meadows was brought back before the Justice and confessed to everything. Criminal proceedings were then brought under the guidance of the lawyer “James Margaret” (Jaume Margarit). An executioner was brought from Gandia just in case torture or an execution was required. Meadows was then taken to be tried in Valencia by the Inquisition for the crime of sacrilege. Margaret asked that the sentence be carried out in Alcoy so that Meadows could serve as an example to other criminals. Meadows was beheaded and dismembered five days later in Alcoy, his head was hung from the door of Monastery of Saint Augustus in Alcoy and his right hand (with which it was assumed he committed the crime) was placed in Priest's Houses Square (Plaza de las Casas de la Curia). The rest of his remains were not buried but were scattered by the side of the roads surrounding Alcoy.

== Hidden issues in the story ==
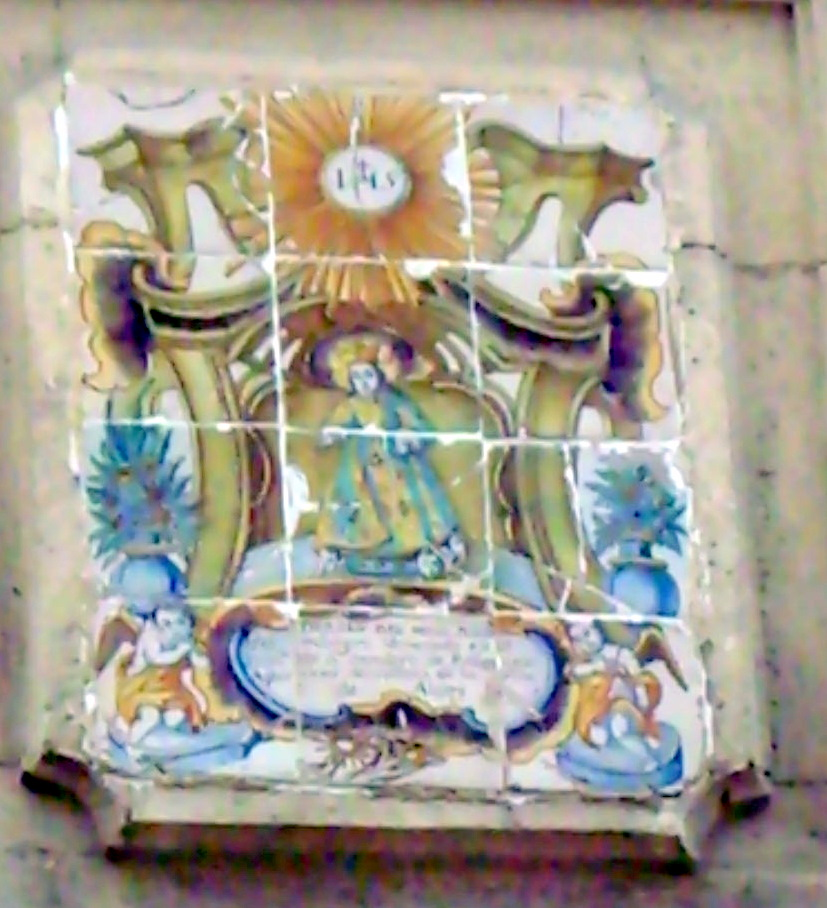
Image of Jesuset del Miracle (18th Century)

All the reports of the crime are at pains to emphasize the fact that John Meadows was French, which was one of the main reasons that he was suspected of the crime. The reports say that Meadows had recently returned from France after some years absence from Alcoy. The fact that he had left a France wrought by religious wars led people to believe that he had fled from persecution by Catholics in France. In addition, there was a general atmosphere of xenophobia throughout the country at this time.

It is also said that a statuette of the Baby Jesus, which was in the house of a Señora Miralles next to Meadows’ house, had bent over and pointed out the place where the liturgical vessels were hidden. Although no written record of this part of the story appears until 1627 seventy years after the crime was committed. On 6 November of that year the Justice of the Peace, Jurors and Public Ombudsman took oral statements that corroborated the story that during the days when the citizens of Alcoy were searching for the objects the image of Baby Jesus, which usually had his right arm raised, with two fingers pointing upwards and his body erect, had bent at the waist and its arm and fingers pointed at the place where the objects were hidden. The longest statement came from a 95-year-old widow Jerónima Vilaplana.

Meadows’ house was bought in order to consecrate it and Señora Miralles donated the image of Baby Jesus so that it would be venerated. Archbishop Ribera proposed that the house should be converted into a convent and it was renovated for this purpose and opened in October 1597.

== Bibliography ==
- BERENGUER BARCELÓ, Julio. Historia de Alcoy. Recopilación de documentos, testimonios, datos y noticias. Alcoy: Llorens distribuidor, 1977. (Tomo I) pp. 239–268 (in Spanish)
- SANTONJA CARDONA, Josep Lluis. "El Jesuset del Miracle" en Història d'Alcoi, Alcoi: Ajuntament d'Alcoi, Editorial Marfil, S.A., Centre Alcoià d'estudis Històrics i Arqueològics, 2006, pp. 202–203 ISBN 84-89136-50-5 (in Valencian / Catalan)
