= Llotja de Sant Jordi =

Coordinates: 38°41′52.99″N 0°28′22.28″W

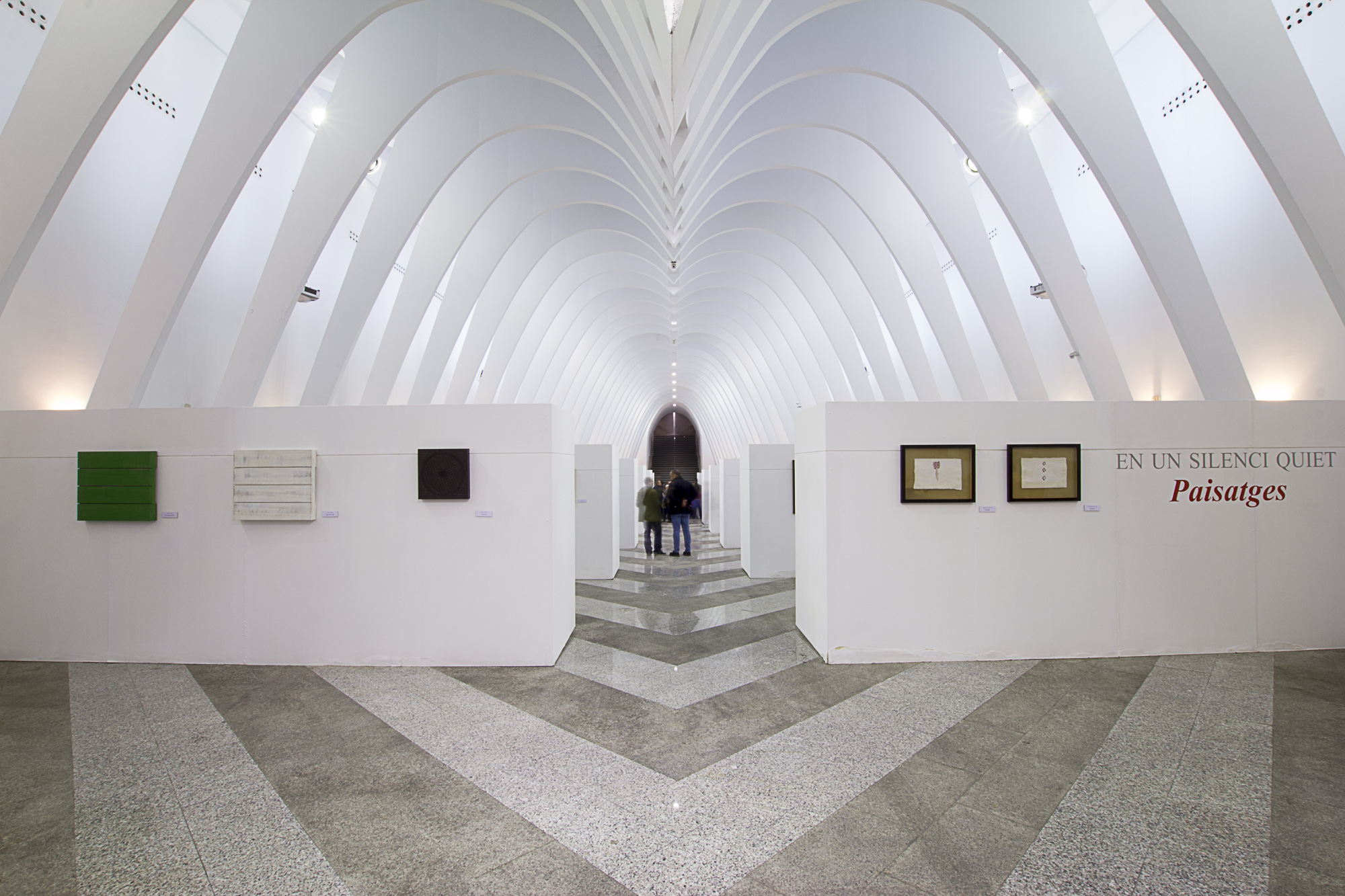
- Indoor of Llotja de Sant Jordi
- Interactive map of the Llotja de Sant Jordi area

General information
- Location: Alcoy, (Alicante), Valencian Community, Spain
- Construction started: 1992
- Completed: 1995

Design and construction
- Architect: Santiago Calatrava

The Llotja de Sant Jordi is an exhibit hall in Alcoi (Alacant), Valencian Community, located underground at Plaça d'Espanya (Spain Square).

It was designed by the Valencian architect Santiago Calatrava and built in 1992-1995. Its internal structure consists of his iconic, Gaudiesque parabolic arches, here in pristine white and reminiscent of the ribs of a large animal, such as a whale. Although underground, it enjoys natural lighting and has interesting hydraulic mechanisms at the entrance doors.

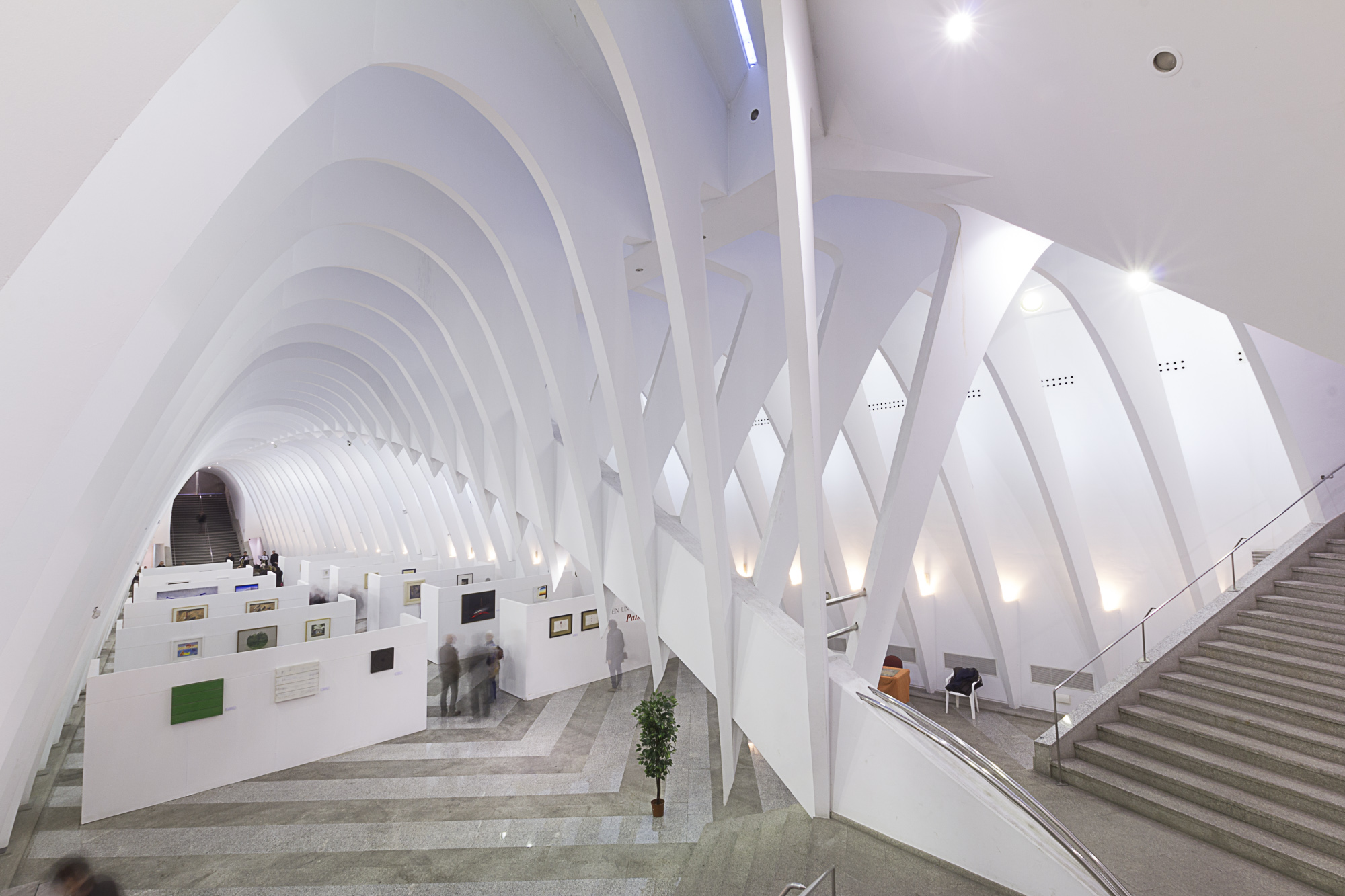
Interior of the Llotja de Sant Jordi (Alcoi), by Santiago Calatrava

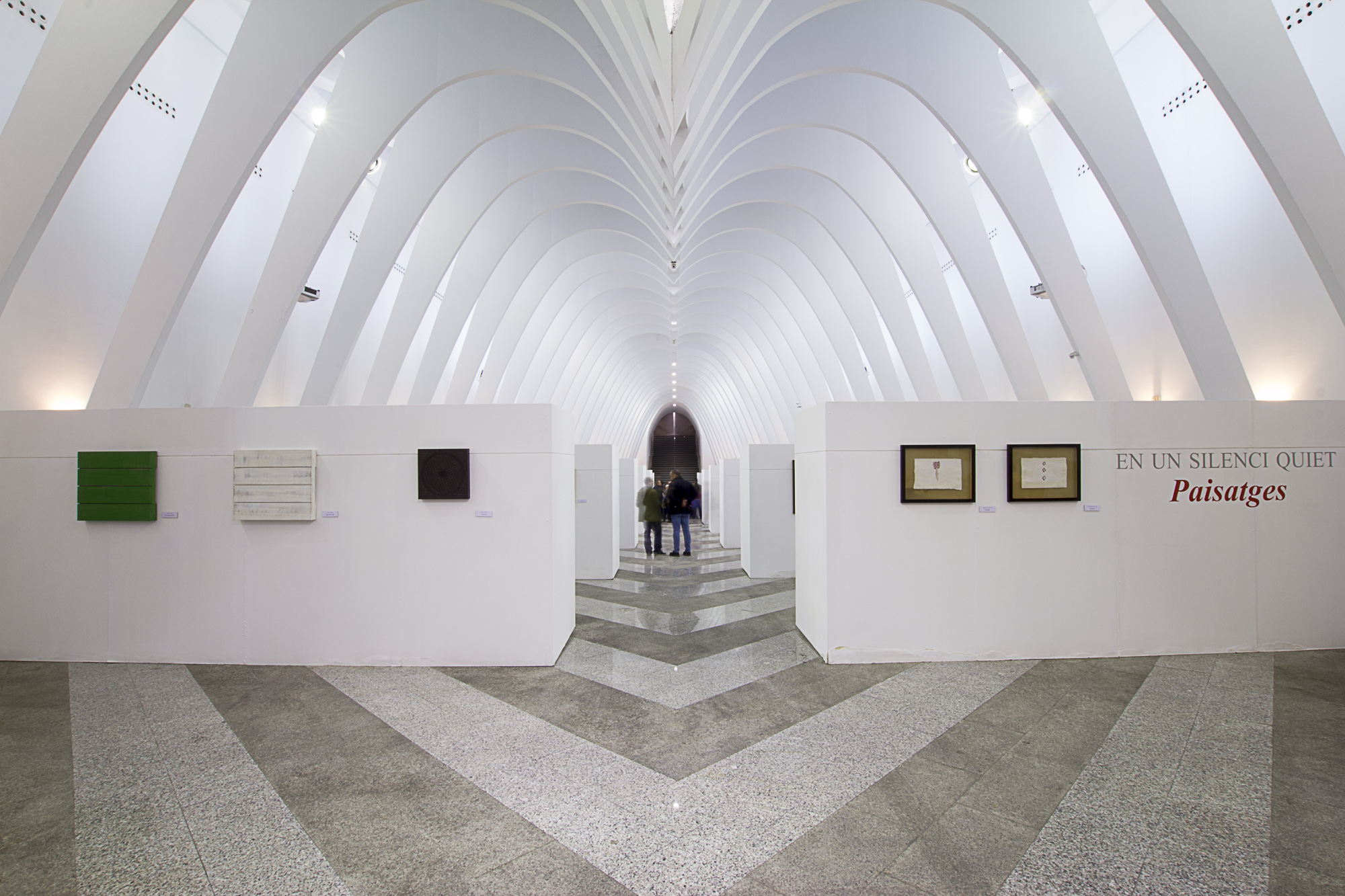
Interior of the Llotja de Sant Jordi (Alcoi), by Santiago Calatrava

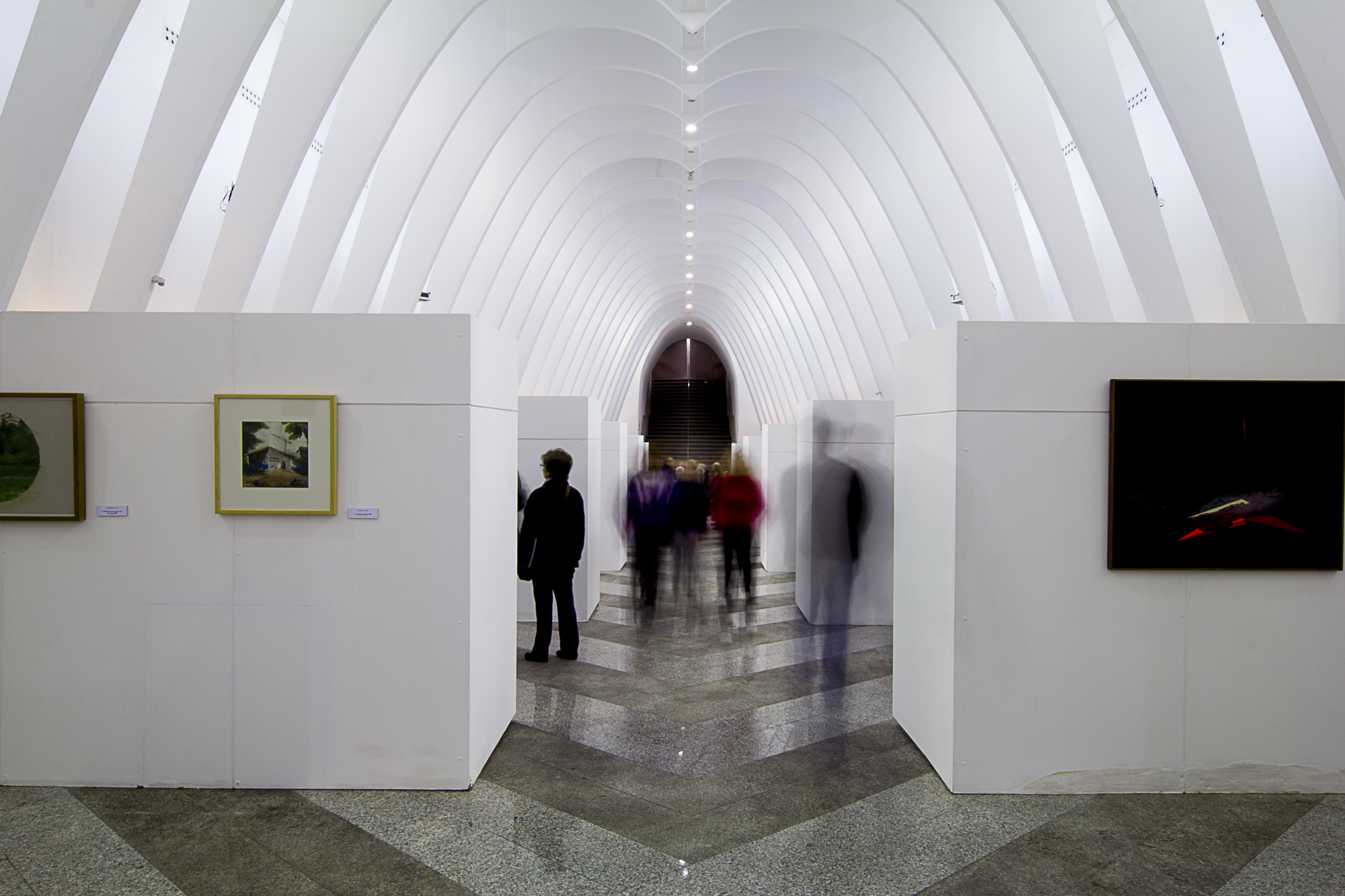
Interior of the Llotja de Sant Jordi (Alcoi), by Santiago Calatrava
