= De Dins Square =

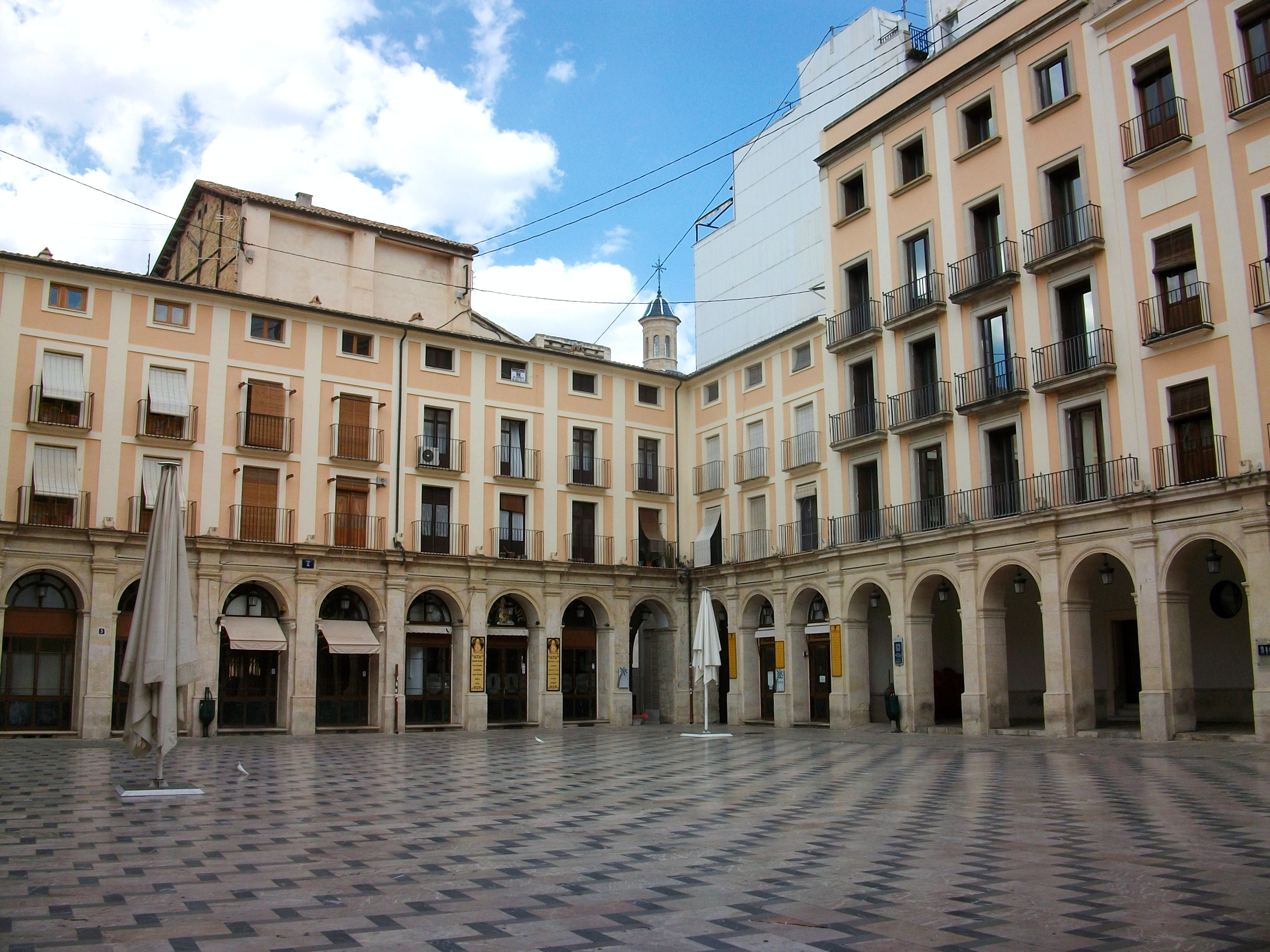
- De Dins Square

General information
- Type: Square
- Location: Alcoy, (Alicante), Valencian Community, Spain
- Coordinates: 38°41′52.43″N 0°28′25.57″W
- Construction started: 19th century

De Dins Square (en: Indoor Square) in Alcoy (Alicante), Valencian Community, was built in the mid-19th century. It is a neoclassical set of trapezoidal ground with arches of half point on lower floors which leads to ten buildings that compose it, built in the space of the cloister of the old convent of San Agustín.

Square following the typology of colonnaded main squares that originated in Spain in the 17th century and which were developed by academics in the reuse of spaces of the convents acquisition in the 19th century.

The ground floor unit and built in stone, is framed by arches and pilasters in some buildings, while in other trades fall directly to the square. The high floors for dwellings, have heights of cornice and composition of different facades, varying between four and five storeys, the remaining unit to the urban image.

== Bibliography ==
- Guía de Arquitectura de la Provincia de Alicante. ISBN 84-7784-353-8
