= Coliseo theatre =

Theatre in Eibar, Spain

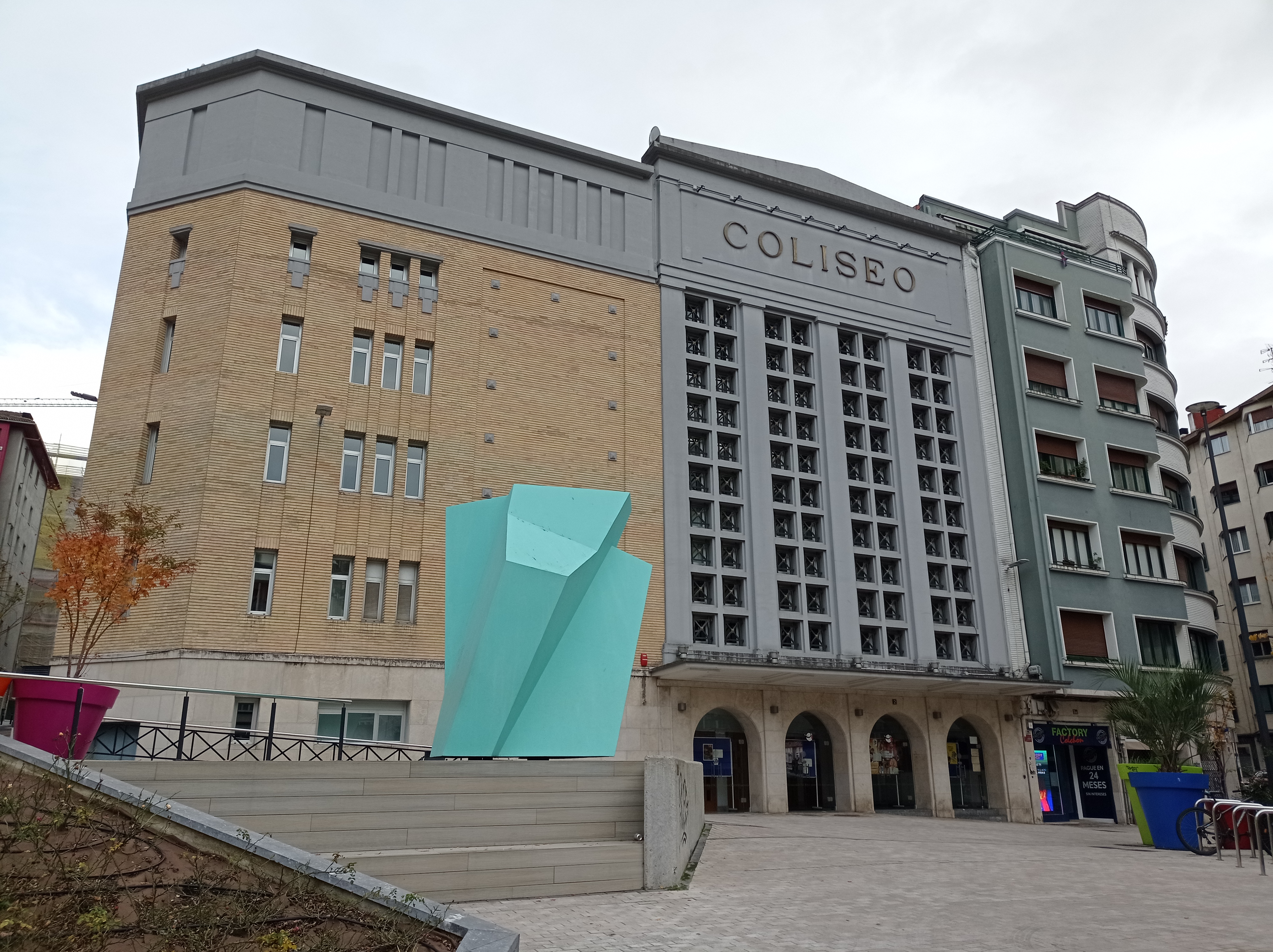
- Interactive map of the Coliseo theatre area

General information
- Location: Eibar
- Inaugurated: 1949

Height
- Architectural: Expressionist architecture

Design and construction
- Architect: Víctor Eusa Razquin

The Coliseo Theatre (Spanish: Teatro Coliseo, Basque: Coliseo Antzokia) is a theatre building and cultural venue in Eibar, Spain. It was built in 1949 and designed by the architect Víctor Eusa Razquin. It is an expressionist and classicist building, with modernist elements in the façade.

== History ==
The Coliseo was built in the context of the redevelopment and reconstruction of Eibar, which was left in ruins in the Spanish Civil War, in what the Franco regime called the War-Devastated Regions rebuilding plan. Within the application of that plan in Eibar, the theater was built adjacent to some houses designed a year earlier by architects Domínguez-Elósegui and Ponte, buildings that Eusa explicitly mentioned in his project, and with which he combined the theater's look and volume.

The theater was opened in 1949 and functioned mainly as a cinema venue until 1987. That year the cinema was closed and a demolition file was initiated in the Eibar town hall. The Basque-Navarrese College of Architects filed an appeal against the demolition, defending Eusa, and it was paralyzed.

In the 21st century, a reform was carried out, respecting the exterior and remodeling the entire interior, directed by the architects José Miguel Martín Herrera, Fernando Oñoro and Jorge Unzeta-Barrenetxea. It was re-inaugurated on March 23, 2007, with three halls, the main one with a capacity of 547 seats for theater, cinema or musical shows, and two cinema halls with a capacity of 84 and 74 seats.
