= Iglesia arciprestal de Santa María (Alcoy) =

Coordinates: 38.698611°N 0.473056°W

- Iglesia arciprestal de Santa María
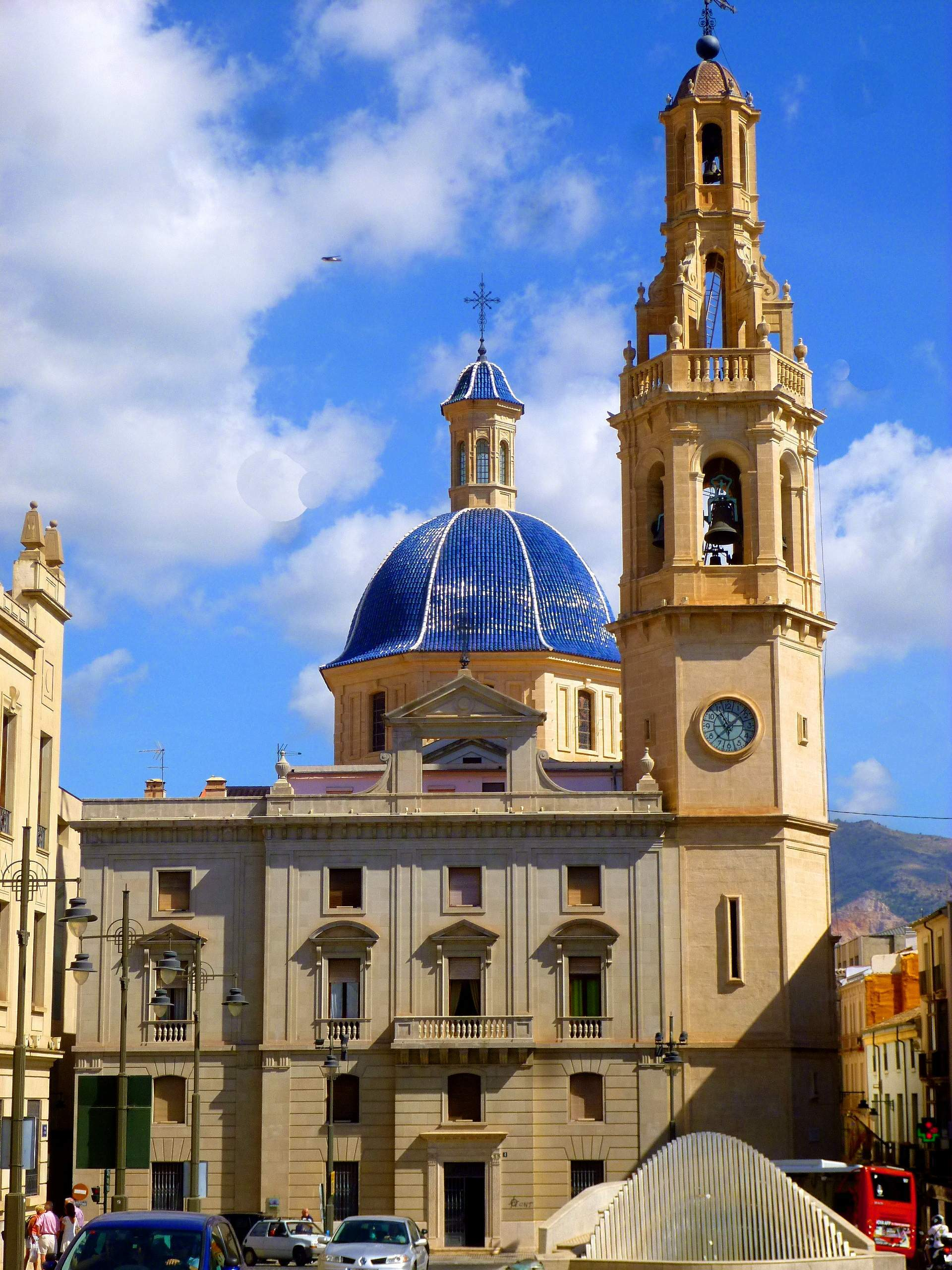
- Iglesia arciprestal de Santa María
- Iglesia arciprestal de Santa María
- Location: Alcoy (Valencia)
- Country: Spain
- Denomination: Roman Catholic

Administration
- Diocese: Valencia

The Iglesia arciprestal de Santa María is a former Spanish church in Alcoy, province of Alicante. It was constructed in the 18th century at the convent of St. Augustine, which was built in the 13th century. In 1936, the building was demolished, losing almost all the pictorial heritage on its walls. The reconstruction began in 1940 and on 19 May 1955, the new church was blessed on the site where the older building had stood, matching its original appearance and using the remains of the previous building.

== History ==
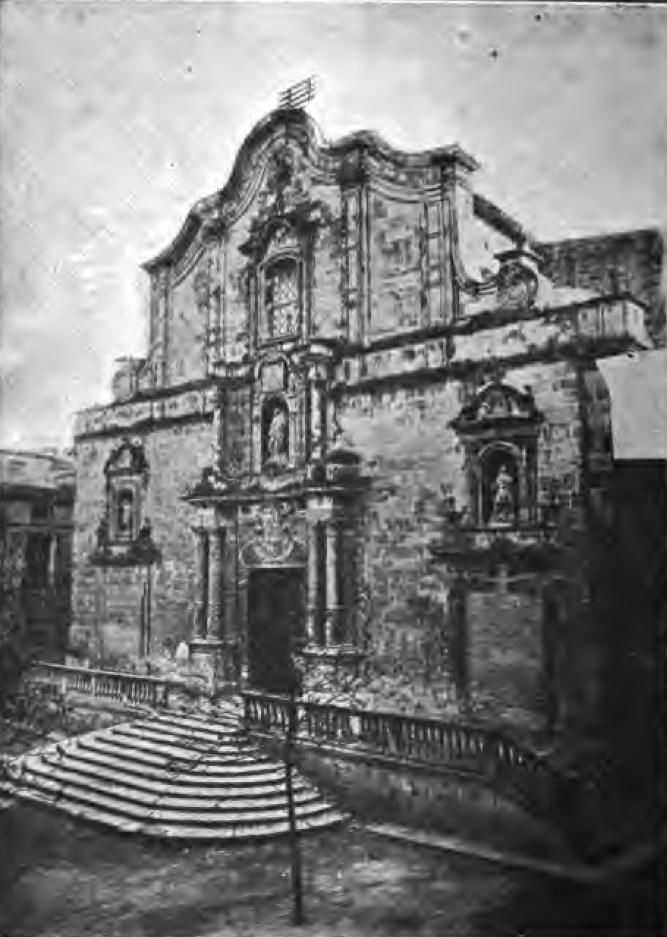
Iglesia de Santa María

In the first decades of the 18th century, the city decided to construct a large church in Alcoy in the highest area, adjacent to the 14th century convent of Sant Agustí. The church knew its zenith in the late 19th century because of artistic activity in the city due to the patronage of the local entrepreneurs of wool, paper and steel.

During the Spanish Civil War, it was vandalized and became municipal property. Inexplicably, it was decided to demolish it. After the war, it was decided to build a new church in the likeness of the former.

== Bibliography ==
- Vicedo Sanfelipe, Remigio, Guía de Alcoy, Imp "El Serpis", Alcoy, 1925.
- Remigio Vicedo.- El Archivo de Alcoy Publicacions de la Universitat d'Alacant
- Berenguer Barceló, Julio, Historia de Alcoy, Llorens, Alcoy, 1977, ISBN 84-400-4018-0.
- El Alcoy del Siglo XX, Ciudad de Alcoy, Grupo Z, Alcoy/Alcoi, dep. legal V-1440-2001
- Botella, Pepa; Autoretrato con paisaje (Ramón Castañer), Ramón Castañer Segura, [Elche], 2007 ISBN 978-84-611-5631-3 Ramón Castañer

== See also ==
- Catholic Church in Spain
