= Museu Alcoià de la Festa =

Museum of the Moors and Christians of Alcoy
- Museu Alcoià de la Festa
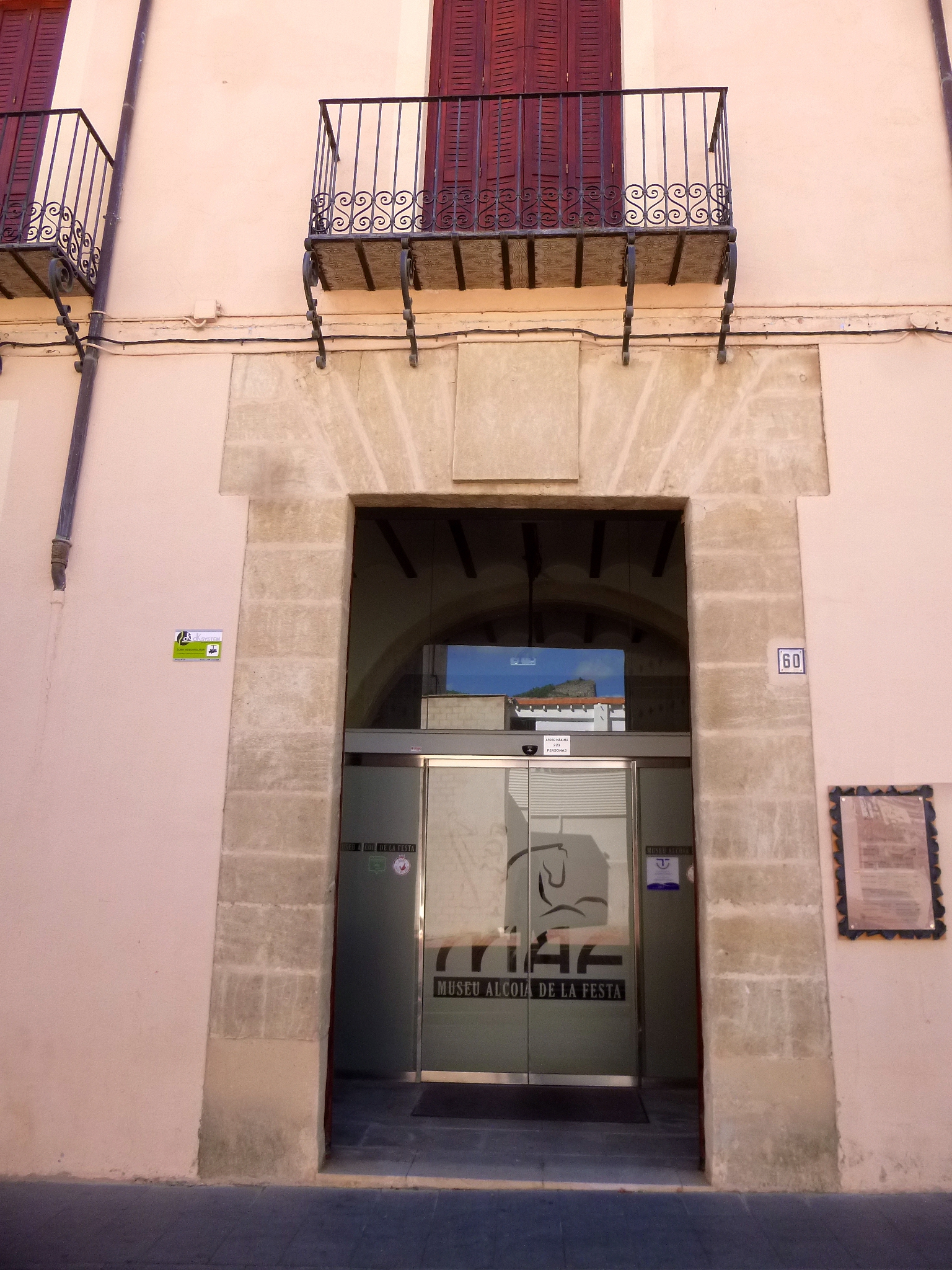
- Established: 2006
- Location: Calle Sant Miquel nº 60-62 - Alcoy (Alicante), Spain
- Coordinates: 38°42′02″N 0°28′23″W
- Website: Museu Alcoià de la Festa

The Museu Alcoià de la Festa MAF (en: Museum of the Moors and Christians of Alcoy) in Alcoy (Alicante), Valencian Community, is a museum dedicated entirely to the festival of the Moors and Christians of Alcoy, where the visitors can experience all the details, aspects and feelings surrounding this international festival.

== Building ==
The stately building that houses the MAF popularly known in Valencian as "Casal de Sant Jordi", has its origins in the 17th century and was owned by the noble families Jorda and Merita, until its acquisition in 1954 by the Association of Sant Jordi which rehabilitated it to house its headquarters. The building comprises semi-basement and three upper floors.

== Museum ==
The origin of the Museum lies in the fact that every year all the captains and lieutenants of the Moorish and Christian filà donated their costumes to the Sant Jordi Association, organizer of the festival of Moors and Christians in Alcoy. This old museum with an extensive collection of designs along with many other objects was in the own headquarters of the association. It will be in the year 2004 when the association decided to create the new museum that was opened in 2006.

== See also ==
- Moors and Christians of Alcoy
