= San Jorge Bridge =

San Jorge Bridge Pont de Sant Jordi
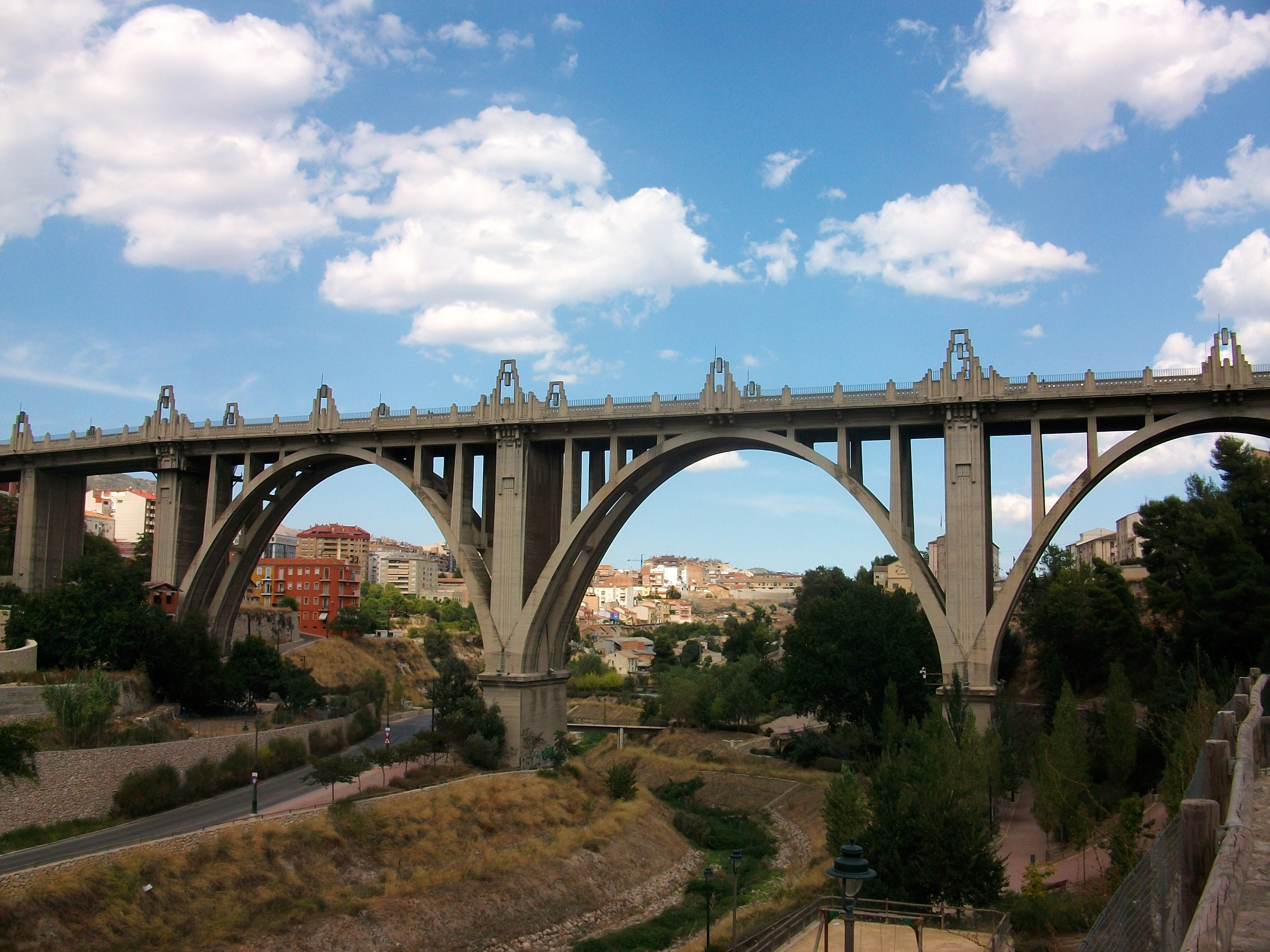
- San Jorge Bridge, in Alcoy
- Coordinates: 38°42′00″N 0°28′31″W
- Crosses: Serpis
- Locale: Alcoy, (Alicante), Spain

Characteristics
- Material: Reinforced concrete
- Total length: 245 m (804 ft)
- Height: 45.40 m (149.0 ft)

History
- Architect: Víctor Cune
- Engineering design by: Carmelo Monzón y Reparaz and Vicente Redón
- Construction end: 1931

The San Jorge Bridge (Pont de Sant Jordi in Valencian, Puente de San Jorge in Spanish), is a bridge located in Alcoy (Alicante), Valencian Community, Spain, crossing the Serpis River.

The style of the bridge is the art déco, is considered to be the most popular image of the city. It is one of the most representative art déco works in the Valencian Community and of the most colossal of this architectural style in Spain.

== Architecture ==
The authors of the bridge were the architect Víctor Eusa and the engineers Carmelo Monzón Reparaz and Vicente Redón. They possessed the collaboration of the civil engineer Alfonso Peña Boeuf during his execution.

The bridge possesses a length of 245 meters and a height of 45,40 meters on the Riquer river. It is placed in Alcoy's city center, communicating the ancient core with the widening that was foreseen to open in the areas known as the Horta Major.

The project of a viaduct was included inside the plans of urban development at the ends of the 19th century, it appears in the year 1876. But the work does not materialize up to the summer of 1923 for concession to the Navarrese company Erroz and San Martín.

The works began in 1925, using reinforced concrete as material and with the own forms of the art déco style. The props are of ashlars and masonry and it possesses four principal supports.

The work was financed by the municipality of Alcoy and it had a budget of 1.336.824 of pesetas and six years of works. It was inaugurated on March 26, 1931.
