= Alcoy, Spain =

Alcoy Alcoi
- City and municipality
- Alcoi / Alcoy (official)
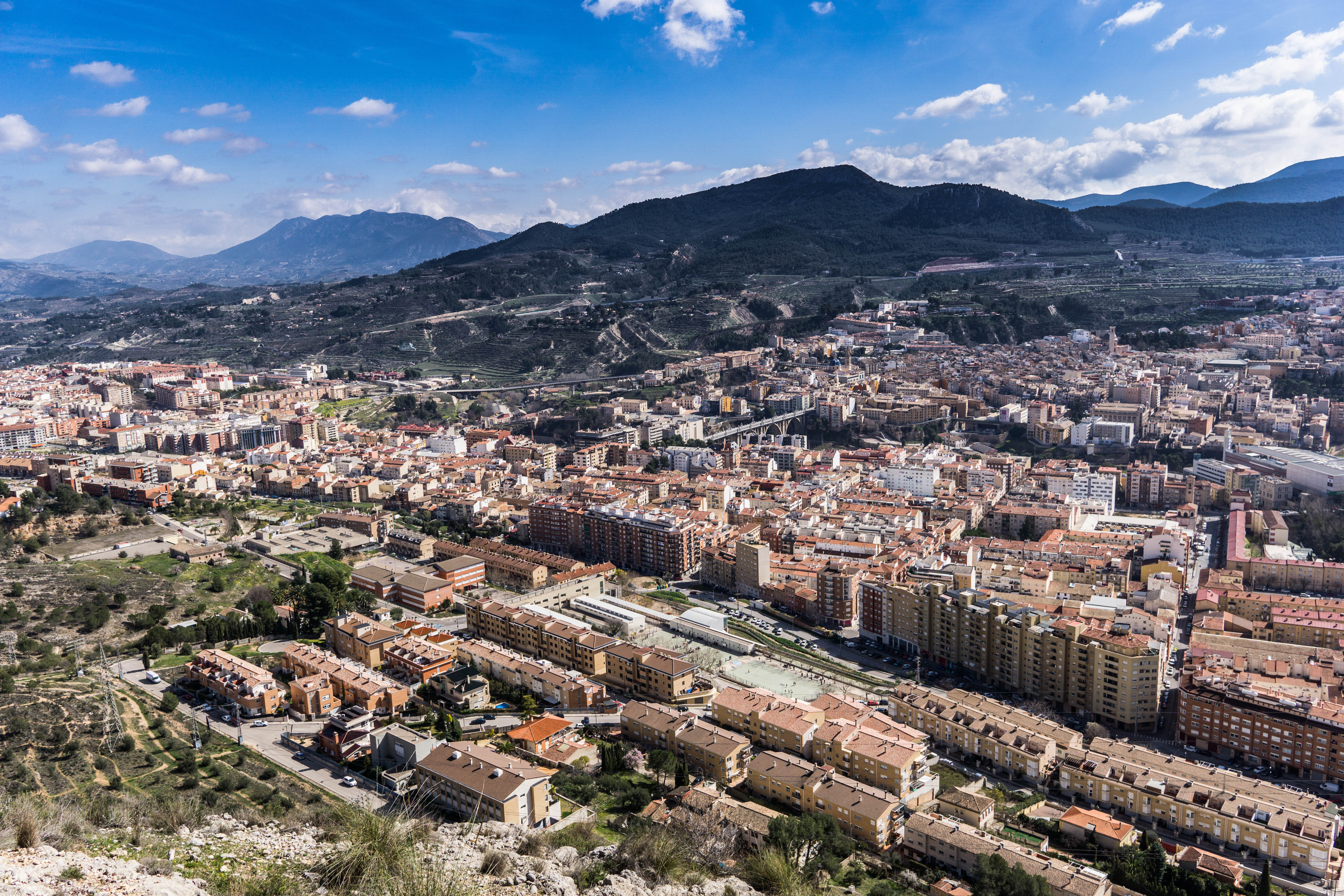
- Panoramic view of Alcoi, Alicante Province

- Flag Coat of arms

- Location in Spain Alcoi / Alcoy (Valencian Community) Alcoi / Alcoy (Spain)
- Coordinates: 38°41′54″N 0°28′25″W
- Country: Spain
- Autonomous community: Valencian Community
- Province: Alacant / Alicante
- Comarca: Alcoià
- Judicial district: Alcoi / Alcoy

Government
  - Alcalde (Mayor): Antonio Francés Pérez (2011) (PSOE-PSPV)

Area
  - Total: 129.86 km^{2} (50.14 sq mi)
- Elevation: 562 m (1,844 ft)

Population (2025-01-01)
  - Total: 61,468
  - Density: 473.34/km^{2} (1,225.9/sq mi)
- Demonyms: Alcoyan • alcoià, -ana (Val.) • alcoyano, -na (Sp.)
- Official language(s): Valencian; Spanish
- Linguistic area: Valencian
- Time zone: UTC+1 (CET)
  - Summer (DST): UTC+2 (CEST)
- Postal code: 03801–03804 and 03818
- Website: Official website

Alcoy, (Note: Pronunciation of Alcoi: Spanish: [alˈkoj]) in Spanish, or Alcoi, (Note: Pronunciation of Alcoi: [alˈkɔj]) in Valencian (officially: Alcoi / Alcoy), is a city and municipality within the Province of Alicante, in the Valencian Community, Spain. The Serpis river crosses the municipal boundary of Alcoy. The local authority reported a population of 61,468 residents in 2025.

== History ==
The first traces of human presence in the area date to c. 60,000 years ago, when Neanderthal hunters settled here, in a site now called El Salt. A site with rock paintings, dating to c. 10,000/6,500 years ago, has been discovered near la Sarga. From around the mid-3rd millennium BC people started to move from the caves to the plain where cereals were grown, while mountain fortifications were erected (Mola Alta de Serelles, Mas del Corral, Mas de Menente, El Puig).

After the Roman conquest of the Iberians, several rural villas were built in the area, as well as a necropolis. The town was established in 1256 by James I of Aragon, with the construction of a castle on a strategic position over the Serpis river, to secure the southern frontier of the Kingdom of Valencia during the Reconquista.

In 1291 the town was donated by King James II of Aragon to the Sicilian admiral Roger of Lauria; it did not return to royal possession until 1430.

During the War of Spanish Succession, Alcoy sided for the cause of archduke Charles, and was therefore besieged and stripped of numerous privileges, which started a period of decline.

In 1821, about 1200 peasants attacked and destroyed 17 recently introduced automated wool carding & spinning machines that threatened their livelihoods, in the first large scale luddite action in Spain.

In 1873 the workers of Alcoy revolted in the Petroleum Revolution.

== Main sights ==
Many outdoor rock paintings exist in Alcoy, and there are some ruins of an Iberian settlement with fragments of Greco-Roman pottery.

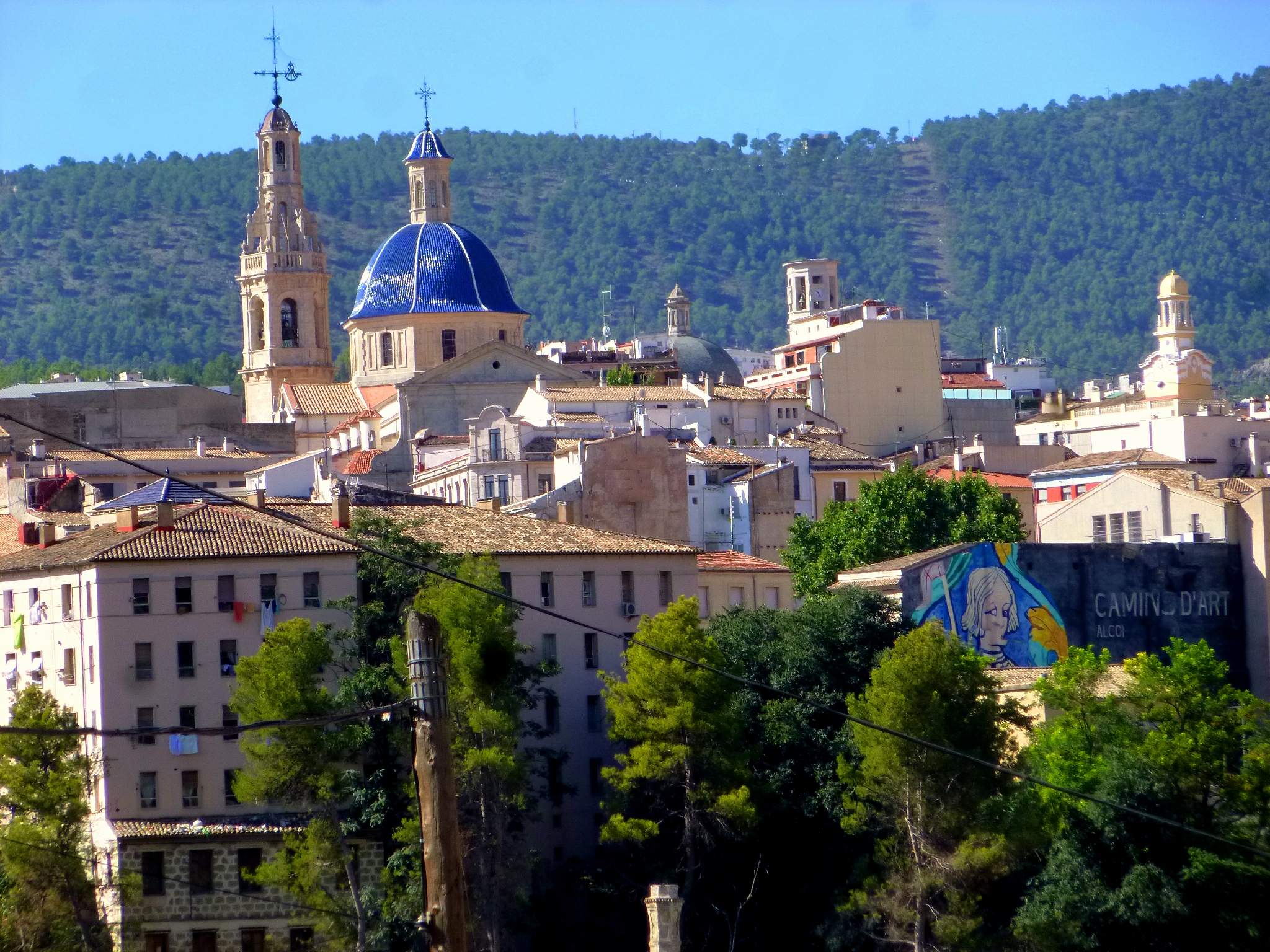
Iglesia Santa Maria of Alcoy

Buildings with an artistic or historical interest in the city include:

- Casa del Pavo (Turkey's house), Art Nouveau work of Vicente Pascual Pastor, (1909).
- Cercle Industrial, Art Nouveau work of Timoteo Briet Montaud, (1909-1911).
- Casa d'Escaló, Art Nouveau work of Vicente Pascual Pastor, (1906-1908).
- Casa Laporta, Art Nouveau work of Timoteo Briet Montaud, (1904).
- Casa Vilaplana, Art Nouveau work of Vicente Pascual Pastor, (1906).
- Casa Briet, Art Nouveau work of Timoteo Briet Montaud, (1910).
- Llotja de Sant Jordi, designed by the architect Santiago Calatrava. Made during the years 1992–1995.
- Pont de Sant Jordi, of art déco style, is considered to be the most popular image of the city.
- Plaça de Dins, a neoclassical square in the city center of Alcoy.
- Església arxiprestal de Santa Maria, in Valencian Baroque style.
- Hermitage of St. Anthony the Abbot (14th-18th centuries).
- Torre de Na Valora, a watchtower from the 13th century.
- Barxell Castle (13th century), of likely Muslim origin. It has a rectangular keep and a court with a rainwater tank.
- Alcoy Cemetery, considered to be one of the most interesting in the Valencian Community, due to its unusual architecture and examples of Valencian Art Nouveau period funerary sculpture. It is listed on the European Cemeteries Route.
- Convent of Sant Agustí, reconstructed in the 18th century with paintings of the 16th century.

== Museums ==
- Museu Alcoià de la Festa, a museum dedicated to the Moors and Christians of Alcoy, where the visitors can experience all the details, aspects and feelings surrounding this international festival.
- Archaeological Museum Camil Visedo, established in 1945.
- Shelter of Cervantes, an air-raid bunker of the Spanish Civil War (1938).
- Firefighters Museum of Alcoy

== Natural parks ==
- Font Roja Natural Park
- Serra Mariola Natural Park

== Economy ==
Alcoi has important industries related to textile, paper, food and metal. Furthermore, Alcoi has many factories that manufacture matches. Today, Alcoi is the financial, commercial and cultural center of the surrounding area.

== Celebrations ==
- Moors and Christians of Alcoy

Alcoi hosts the oldest Cavalcade of Magi in the world. The Jesuset del Miracle is commemorated on the last day of January. The most important touristic celebration is Moros i Cristians, in April.

== Sport ==
The local football club CD Alcoyano is famous across Spain for a proverbial match in which they were facing a very adverse score. When the referee was about to close, the Alcoyano players kept asking for more time to score back and reach a draw. Thus the phrase tener más moral que el Alcoyano ("to have greater morale than Alcoyano") ponders an indefatigable person. Currently, they play in the Segunda División B at El Collao Stadium.

The city is also home to PAS Alcoy, a Spanish roller hockey club, which plays in the OK Liga, the first division of roller hockey in Spain.

== Notable residents ==
- Camilo Sesto (1946-2019), singer
- Vicente Pascual Pastor (1865–1941), architect
- Carmen Jordá (born 1988), racing driver

== See also ==
- Art Nouveau in Alcoy
- Ferrocarril Alcoy Gandia
- Font Roja Natural Park
- Petroleum Revolution
- Jesuset del Miracle
- Església arxiprestal de Santa Maria
