= Church of La Milagrosa, Pamplona =

Coordinates: 42.8087°N 1.6433°W

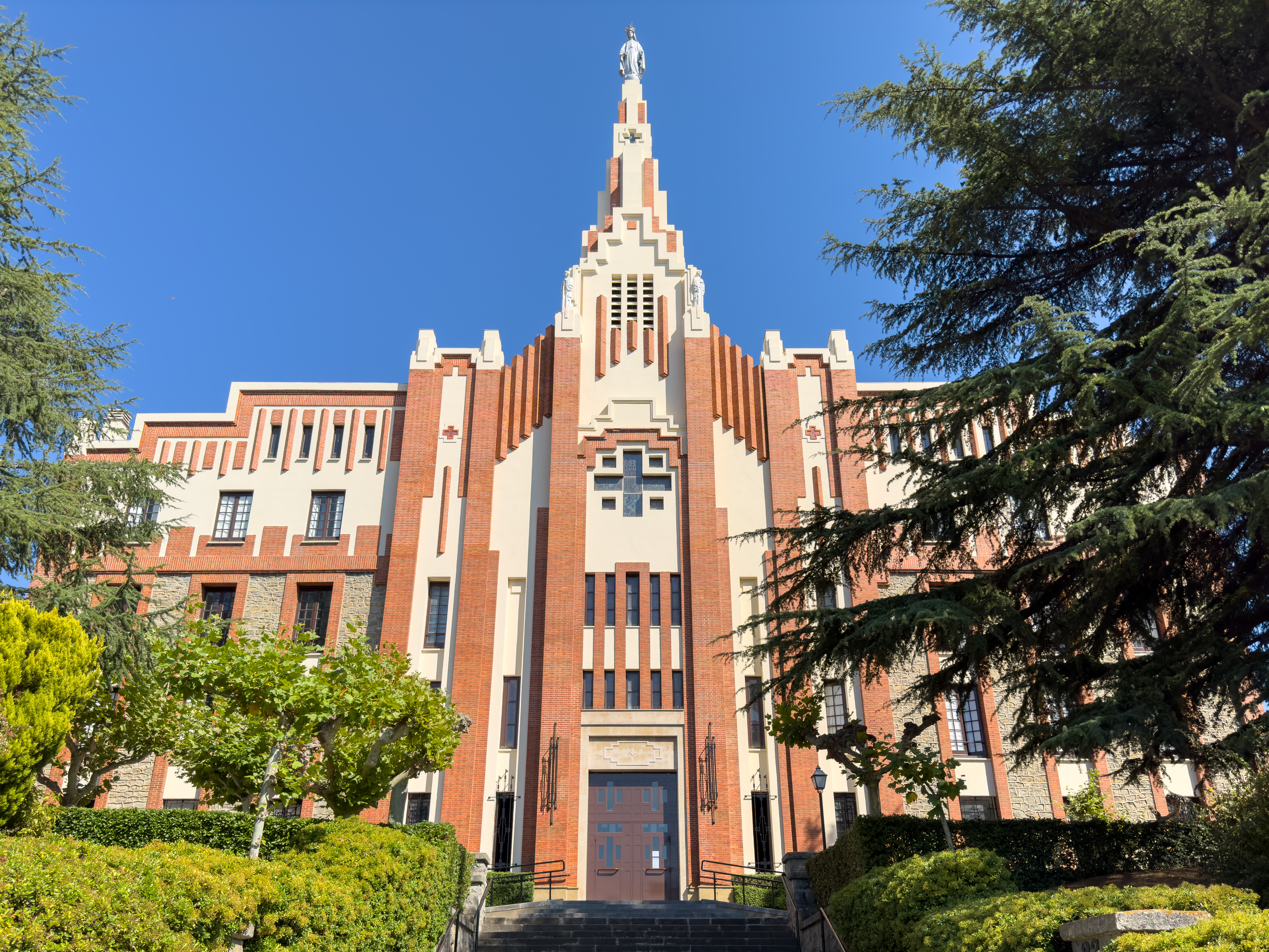
- Alternative names: Padres Paúles, Misioneros Paúles

General information
- Town or city: Pamplona
- Inaugurated: 1930

Height
- Architectural: Expressionist architecture

Design and construction
- Architect(s): Víctor Eusa Razquin

The Church of La Milagrosa is a building located in the Segundo Ensanche development area of Pamplona, built in 1928 and inaugurated in 1930, designed by the architect Víctor Eusa Razquin. It is part of the convent made for the Congregation of the Mission, which members are known as Paules locally, and therefore the church is also known with the names Padres Paúles or Misioneros Paúles.

It is a work from the most expressionist period in Eusa, characterized by the combination of white concrete and red brick, a style that has been defined as déco-expressionism or geometric expressionism.

The feature that stands out in the church is the large geometric tower that narrows as it ascends on the main façade. A sculpture of Christ is above the tower. The use of sculpture in the architecture of Víctor Eusa is common, but, as in this case, they are not human figures with human postures, rather figures of static men or women, geometric like the building itself.

== Gallery ==
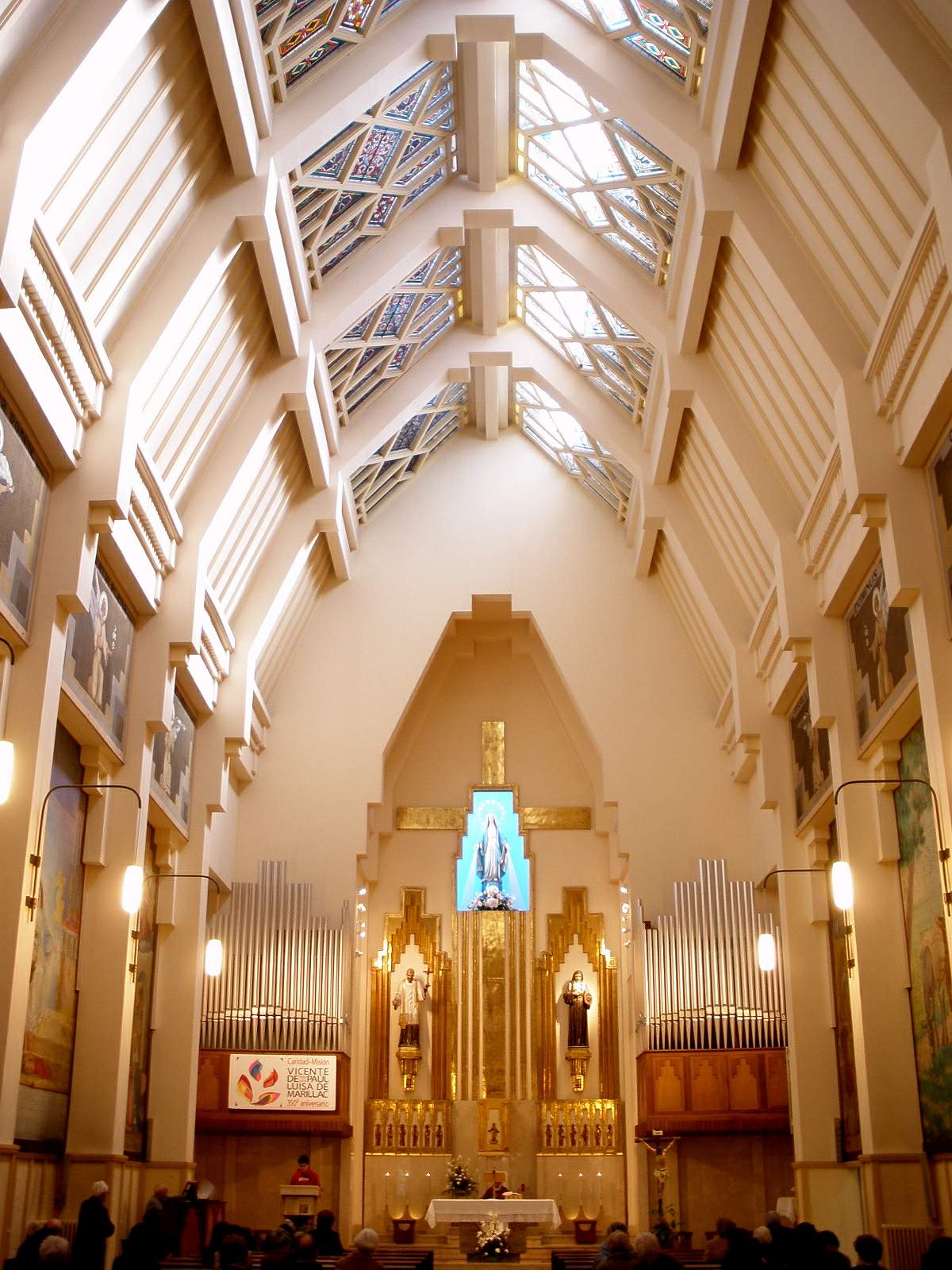

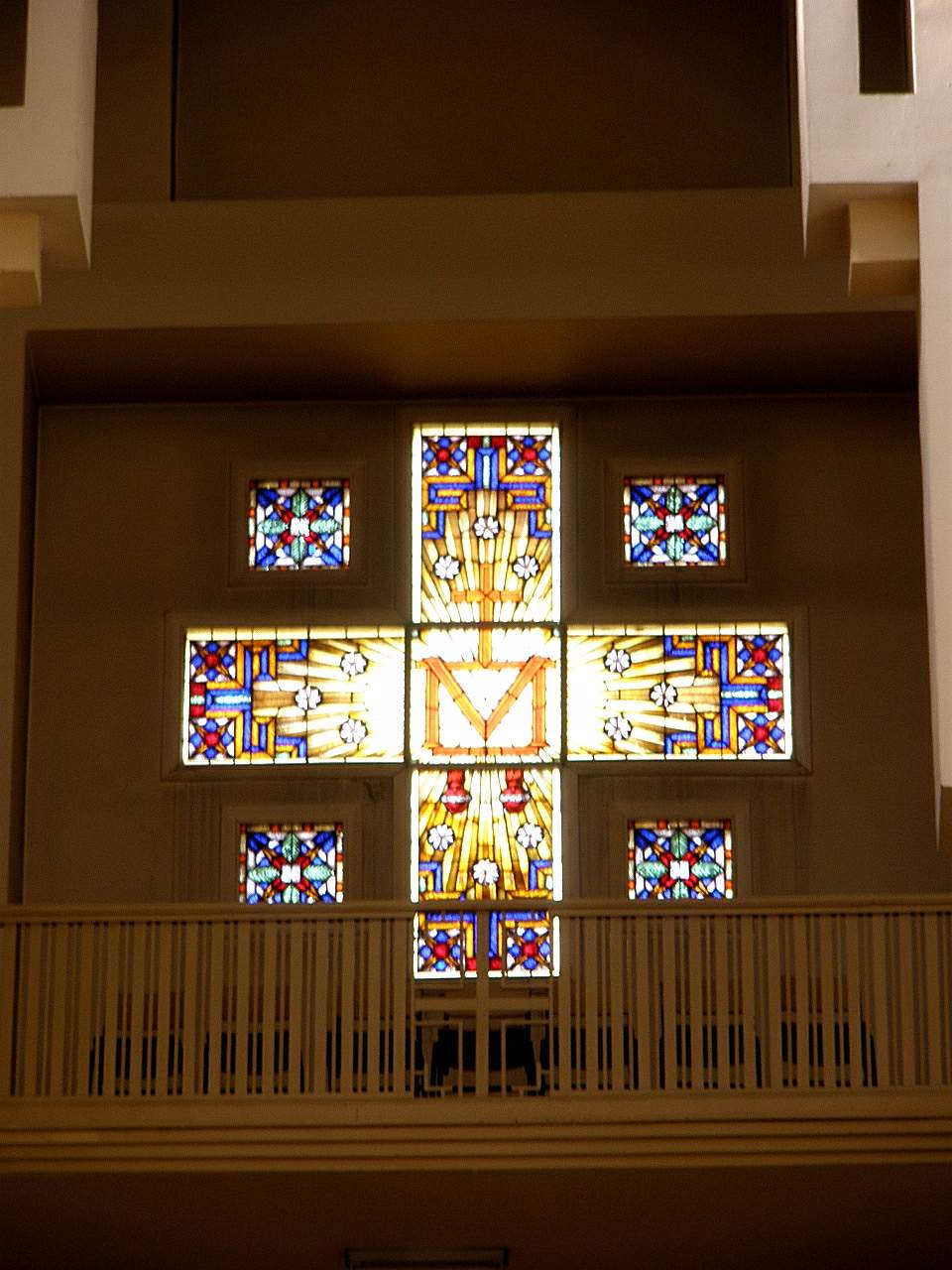

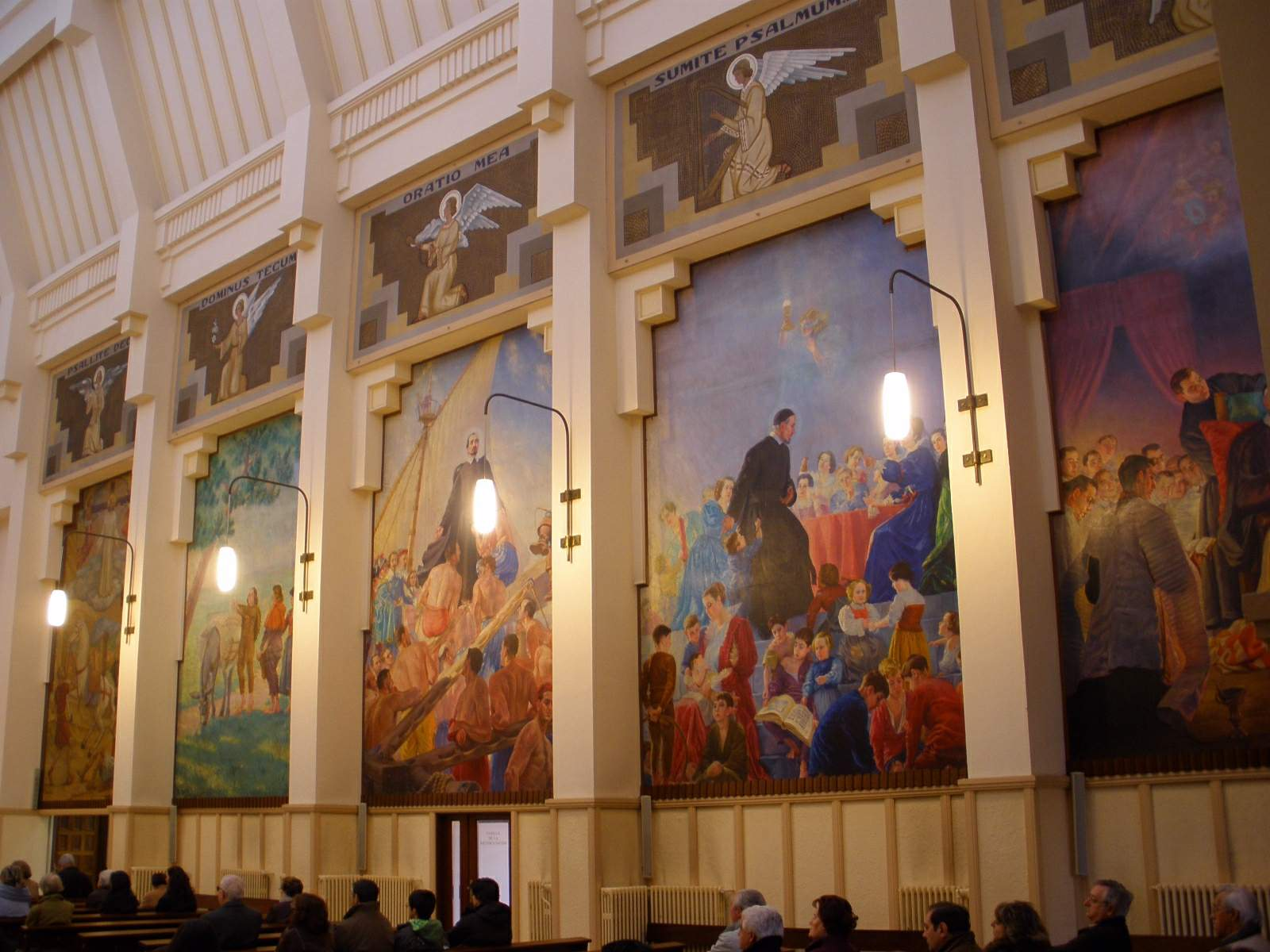
