= La Romana, Spain =

La Romana
- Municipality
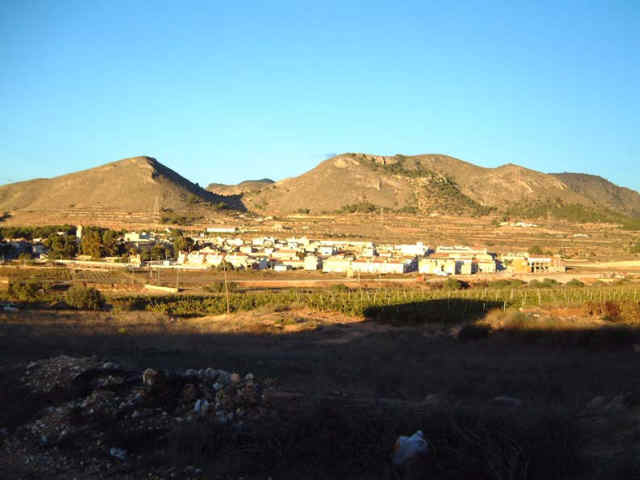

- Coat of arms

- Location in Spain
- Coordinates: 38°22′1″N 0°53′49″W
- Country: Spain
- Autonomous community: Valencian Community
- Province: Alicante
- Comarca: Vinalopó Mitjà
- Judicial district: Novelda

Government
  - Mayor: Manuel Hernández Riquelme (PP)

Area
  - Total: 43.3 km^{2} (16.7 sq mi)
- Elevation: 480 m (1,570 ft)

Population (2025-01-01)
  - Total: 2,729
  - Density: 63.0/km^{2} (163/sq mi)
- Demonym(s): Romaners, Romaneros
- Time zone: UTC+1 (CET)
  - Summer (DST): UTC+2 (CEST)
- Postal code: 03669
- Official language(s): Valencian, Spanish
- Website: Official website

La Romana (Valencian pronunciation: [la roˈmana]) is a village of some 2,500 people, located in the foothills of the Serra del Reclot, in the comarca of Vinalopó Mitjà, a few kilometres from l’Alguenya and several kilometres from el Fondó de les Neus and Novelda, in the autonomous community of Valencia, southern Spain.

The village is surrounded by countryside where vineyards and almond orchards are grown. The area is also noted for the number of quarries producing marble and limestone. There are a number of cave dwellings around La Romana which are still in use, many having been converted into modern homes. The main village is set out on a grid pattern of mostly one-way streets, with very few buildings higher than one storey, with clean, tree lined streets.

The town's popular fiesta is held in the third week of August each year, with a humorous parade held on the Thursday and Moors and Christians parades on the Friday and Saturday. In the autumn a gastronomica is held in the park.

There is a small weekly street market on Saturdays, around where the covered daily market is.

== Notable people ==
- Marquis of La Romana, title of nobility
- Álvaro García Cantó, footballer
