= Vinalopó =

River in Spain

Coordinates: 38.720°N 0.626°W

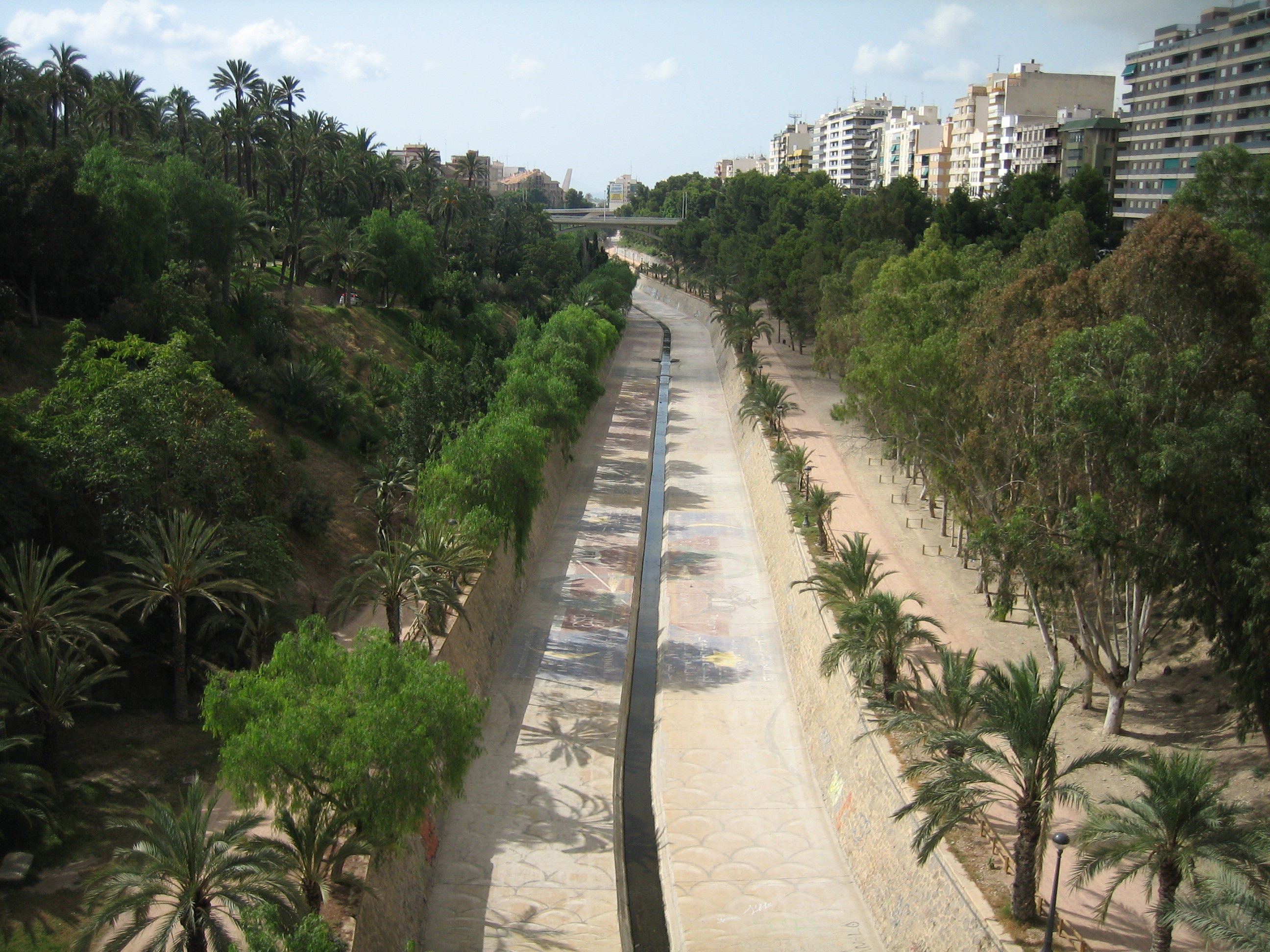
- The Vinalopó river crossing Elche

Location
- Country: Spain

Physical characteristics
- Source
  - location: Bocairent, Valencia, Spain
  - elevation: approx. 800 m (2,600 ft)
- Mouth
  - location: Salines de Santa Pola, near the Mediterranean Sea
- Length: 81.2 km (50.5 mi)
- Basin size: 1,691.7 km^{2} (653.2 sq mi)
- Discharge
  - average: 0.85 m^{3}/s (30 cu ft/s)

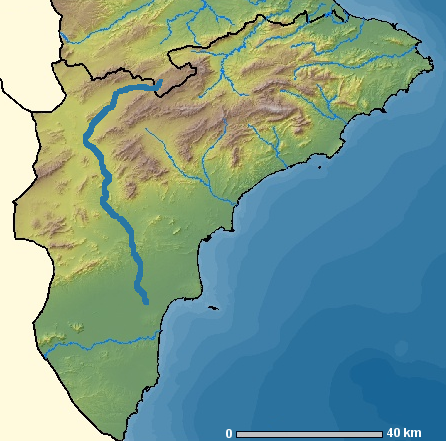
Location of the Vinalopó river in the Alicante province

The Vinalopó (Note: Valencian pronunciation: [vinaloˈpo], Spanish: [binaloˈpo]) is a small river flowing through the Alicante province, of Spain. It flows from north to south and, with a length of 81 km., it is the longest of the rivers which flows for its entire length within the limits of this province. It has historically discharged into the Mediterranean at Salinas de Santa Pola.

For some historians, it corresponds to the Alebus incidentally mentioned by Avienius in his Ora Maritima.

Three comarcas (districts) in the Alicante province are named after it: Alt Vinalopó, Vinalopó Mitjà and Baix Vinalopó which mean, respectively, Upper Vinalopó, Middle Vinalopó and Lower Vinalopó.

Its source lies in a mountainous part of the northwest part of the Alicante province, between Bocairent and Banyeres de Mariola in an area known as Els Bruchs. It does not currently discharge into the Mediterranean Sea, but due to its diminished flow in the lower part of its course, it fades out into a series of small irrigation channels (séquies) which flow south of Elx/Elche into the marshes known as El Fondo Natural Park and the Salines de Santa Pola Natural Park.

The river, despite having been tiny during historical times, represents a significant corridor through the generally mountainous terrain surrounding it, along which several cities were settled, namely, from north to south, Banyeres de Mariola, Villena, Sax, Elda, Petrer, Novelda and Elx/Elche.

== Hydrological regime ==
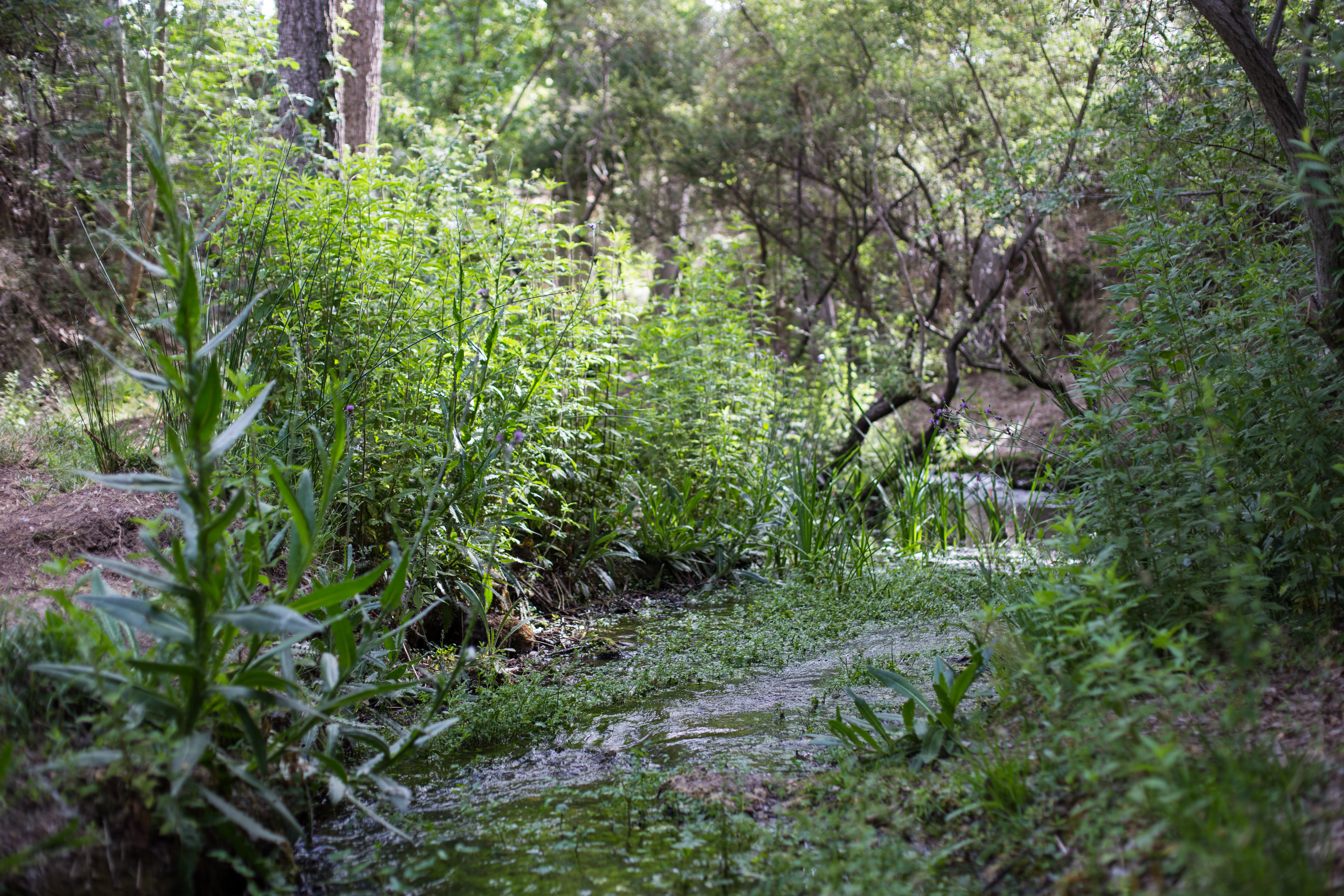
The source of the Marchal, one of two tributaries to the Vinalopó, in the Serra Mariola

Despite officially being called a "river", it is actually more a stream, especially south of Beneixama, not far from its source. In that location, historical farming rights allow the farmers to take most of its flow for agricultural purposes. Past this location, it turns more into a tiny channel draining the residual waters of the various cities it passes through. Thus, south of Beneixama, its flow is depleted, saline, and polluted.

The upper Vinalopó has two small tributaries, the Marchal (a short stream near Banyeres de Mariola) and the Tarafa (another short stream, which flows through Aspe), but both of these may completely dry out during the Summer.

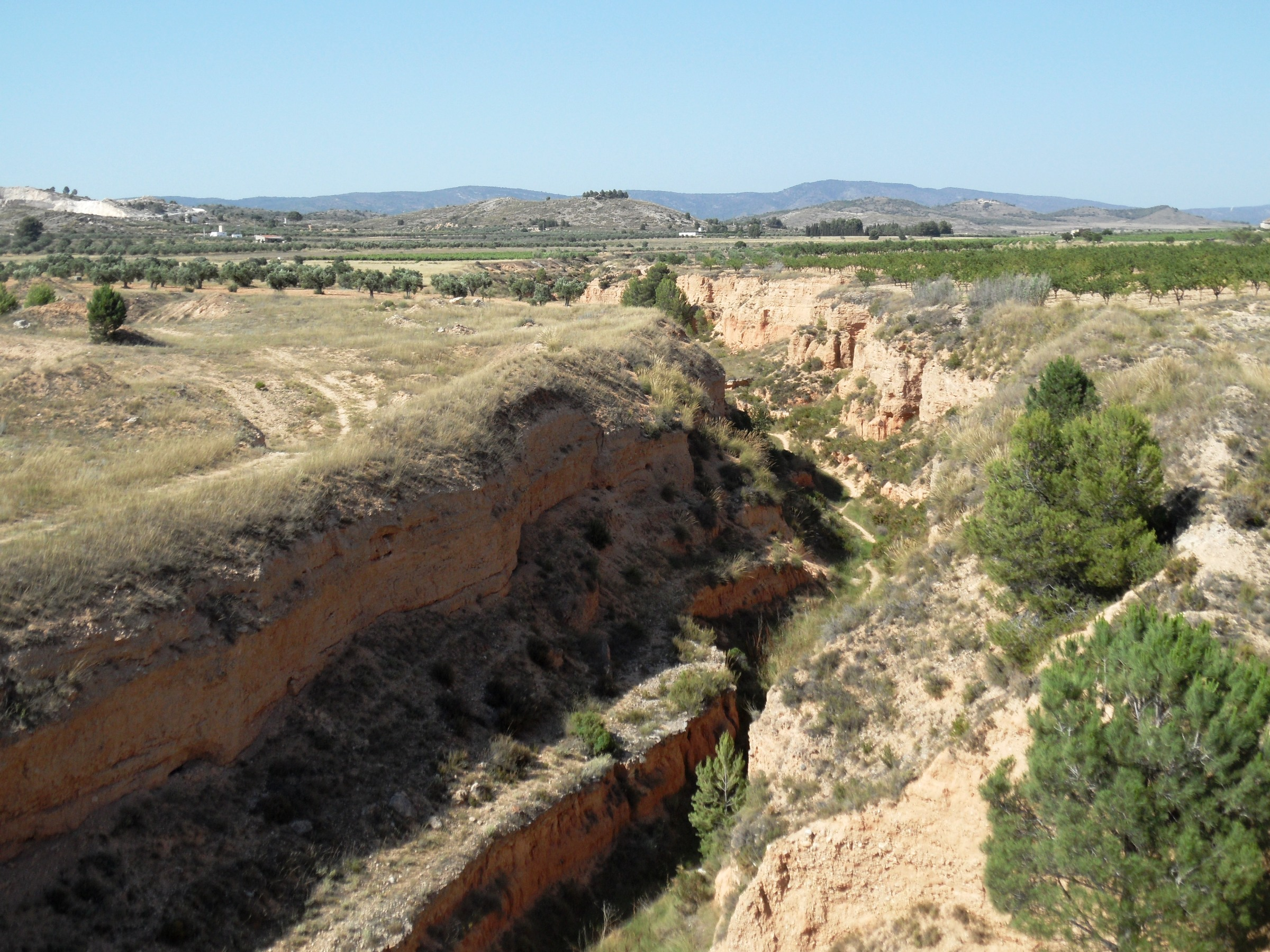
The river in between Villena and Biar with its arid landscape

Perhaps more important than these tributaries are the various ramblas or dry riverbeds which discharge into the Vinalopó following extensive periods of rain. This is because, despite being a very dry area, Alicante province periodically suffers (within a periodicity that has been estimated as approximately once every 9 years or so) brief episodes of torrential rain (predominantly during the Autumn months, especially October and November). Following one of these episodes, all the dry riverbeds fill with water and discharge into the Vinalopó. This means that for the few days it takes until all this water is drained from the surrounding land, the flow rate of the river approaches what it may have been in the very distant past.

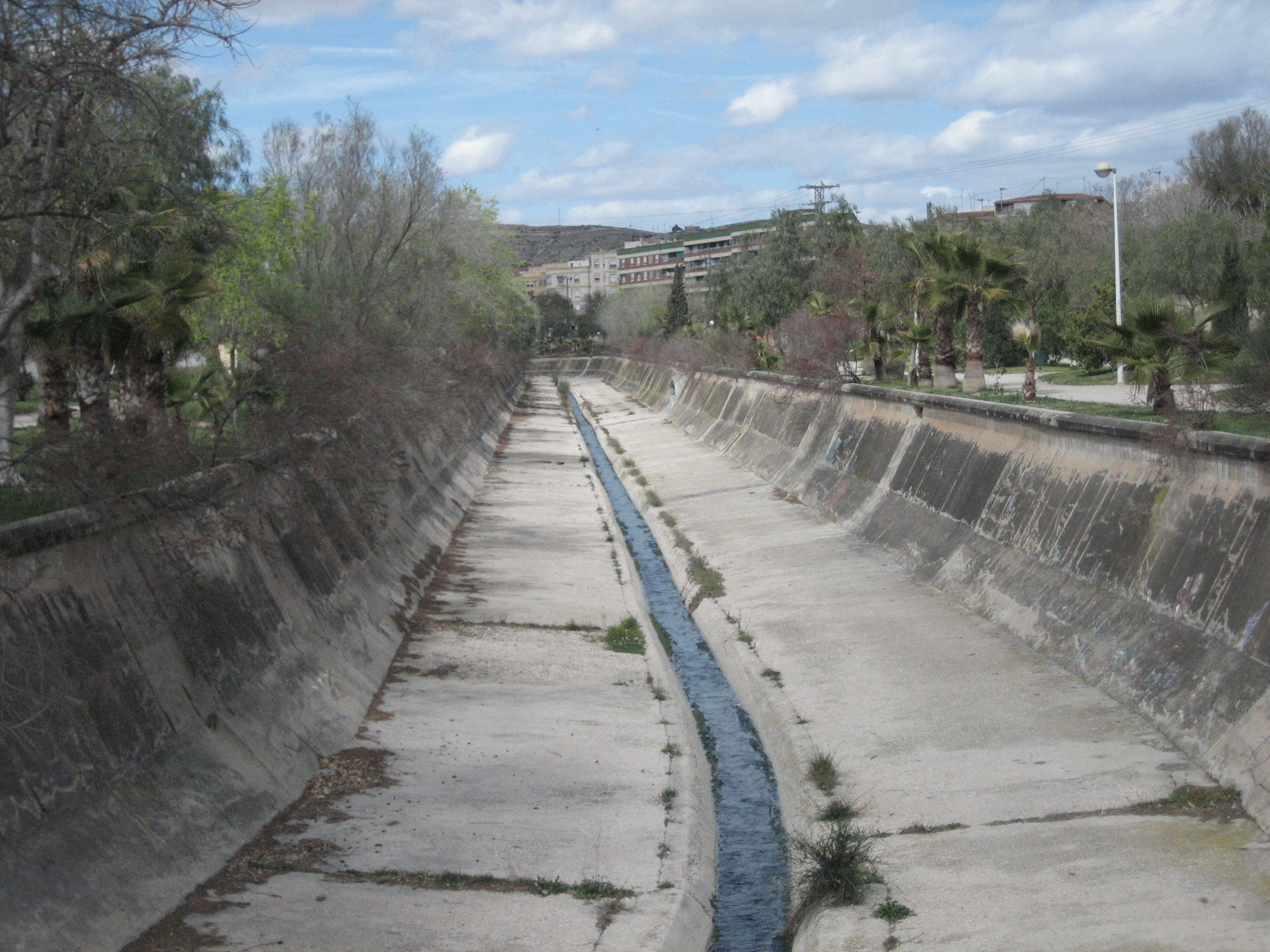
The Vinalopó river near Elda

There are a number of important ramblas in the vicinity of Elda-Petrer such as the Pusa, Melva, Sapo and Bateig. Another tributary is the Acequia del Rey which discharges into the Vinalopó near Santa Eulalia. The waters of this river are briny and they drain the watershed around Villena.

During normal conditions (torrential rain episodes aside), the maximum sustained flow of the Vinalopó is reached by early winter in Colonia Santa Eulalia (near Sax) with an average of just 0,85 m³/s. By the time it reaches Aspe its average flow has reduced to a mere 0,38 m³/s. However, during periods of peak flow the river has breached its banks resulting in flooding that has caused damage to humans and property in Elda, this has occurred on a number of occasions most notable in 1906 and 1982.

Due to the semi-arid climate which characterizes the area that the river flows through (see Geography of the Comunitat Valenciana), the hydrological cycle in the Vinalopo's watershed is extremely fragile. Hence, were it not for sustained agricultural use over the centuries -not only of water extracted from the river but, probably more importantly, from the aquifers related to it- it could be argued that the Vinalopó would be a more substantial river. But at the present time, after centuries of usage, and given the restricted precipitation in the area, its fragile hydrological cycle was definitely broken a long time ago and it is now impossible that the aquifers could replenish within a lifetime, even if exploitation ceased completely.

Due to this over extraction and the droughts that the zone suffers the river bed nearest to the point where it historically discharged into the sea Salines de Santa Pola is left with no flow during certain periods. However, following inundations the river recovers is former flow causing floods in the fields to the south of Elche and in an area of salt flats. This has motivated the Hydrographic Confederation of Júcar to carry out works to recover the former course of the river along its final stretch through the illegal fields around Santa Pola in order that the river discharges into the sea at its former location.

However, due to the particularly dry conditions of the areas it goes through, the Vinalopó may never have been particularly deep or wide, at least not during historical times. Thus, for example, in the 12th century, during the Al-Andalus period, the local author al-Idrîs does not even name it and he just mentions "a brackish stream near Elche whose waters are not good for drinking".

Nevertheless, the Vinalopó has shaped what is, in places, a quite significant riverbed compared to its currently meager flow. This is particularly so in the stretch from Aspe to below Elche. This may be partially explained by repeated flooding episodes over the centuries enhanced by erosion, which the scarcely vegetated matorral areas through which the river passes have suffered over time.

Legend has it that Amílcar Barca, the father of Hannibal, drowned while trying to cross the Vinalopó as he was fleeing the Iberians following one of the many battles between the Carthaginians and the inhabitants of this area of the Iberian Peninsula.

== Urban and industrial axis ==
The valley of the Vinalopó has been the location of many settlements throughout history, as shown by the important Iberian – Roman villages of Idella (Elda) o Illici (Elx/Elche).

During the second half of the 20th century the valley became a dynamic urban and industrial axis with industrial activity mainly concentrated in the footwear and leather goods industries. The majority of Spanish footwear is produced in Elda and Elche and the International Trade Fair for Footwear and Associated Industries has been held in these cities for many years. Shoemaking is also an important industry in other cities such as Petrer, Monòver and Villena.

Viticulture is another important sector in this region, particularly in the Middle Vinalopó, where it is possible to define two different areas, the north and the south. The grapes grown in the northern area (around Monòver, El Pinós and Villena) are used to make wine while those grown in the southern area (centered on Novelda, Aspe and Monforte del Cid) are destined for the table. Grapes grown in the southern area are protected under the designation of origin Vinalopó Grape.

Other commercially important activities include the production of cut stone and marble particularly in the area around Novelda, fishing from the port of Santa Pola and tourism again in Santa Pola and centered on urbanizations near to Elx/Elche (Arenales del Sol, El Altet, La Marina, etc.)

The number of people living in the three comarcas (districts) is around 500,000. The biggest city is Elx/Elche with a population of 230,000, followed by the conurbation of Elda-Petrer-Monòver with 100,000 then Novelda-Aspe with 50,000, Villena has 35,000 inhabitants and Santa Pola has more than 30,000.

== Environment ==
The Vinalopó also has a number of protected wildlife areas. There are three Natural Parks: Serra de Mariola which is important for the conservation of its flora, Salines de Santa Pola and El Fondo both important areas for migratory birds.

Other areas of interest include Salines Lagoon, Serra de Salina, Elda Reservoir and Elx/Elche Reservoir.

== See also ==
- List of rivers of Spain
