= El Fondo Natural Park =

El Fondo
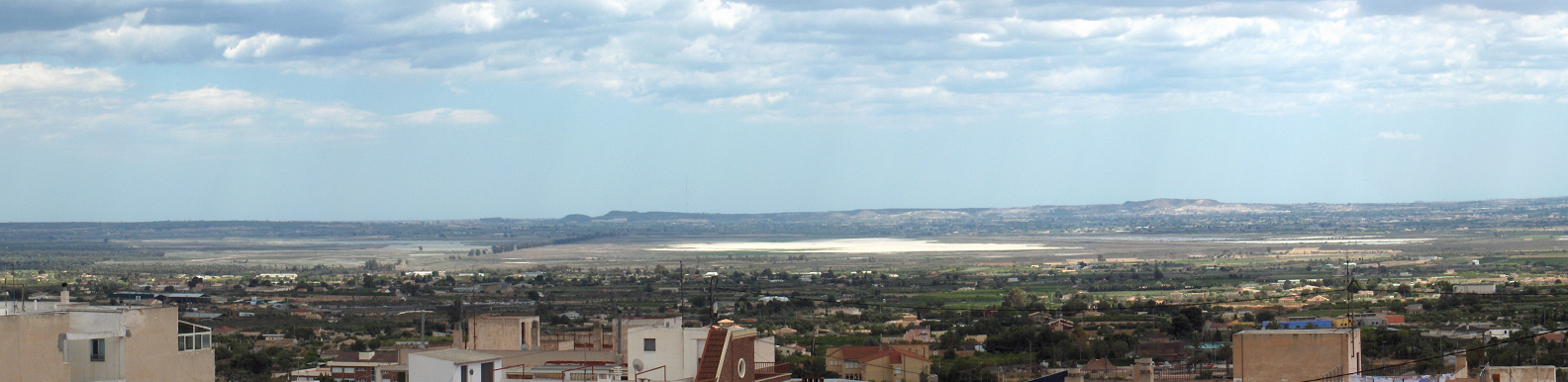
- Natural Park of El Fondo as seen from Crevillent.
- Interactive map of El Fondo
- Location: Spain
- Coordinates: 38°10′55″N 0°45′9″W
- Area: 2.495 ha
- Designation: Natural Park
- Established: 12 December 1988
- Governing body: Generalitat Valenciana

Ramsar Wetland
- Official name: Pantano de El Hondo
- Designated: 5 December 1989
- Reference no.: 455

The El Fondo Natural Park (Valencian: Parc Natural del Fondo, Spanish: Parque Natural de El Hondo) is located within the municipal boundaries of Elche and Crevillent both of which are within the comarca (district) of Baix Vinalopó in the south of the Valencian Community in the east of Spain. Both the rivers Vinalopó and Segura discharge into the lagoons that form this park.

The park is included in the Ramsar convention list of protected wetlands and as a Special Protection Area under the European Union Directive on the Conservation of Wild Birds. It has an area of 2,495 hectares and was declared a Natural Park by the Valencian government (Generalitat Valenciana) on 12 December 1988.

== Topography and climate ==
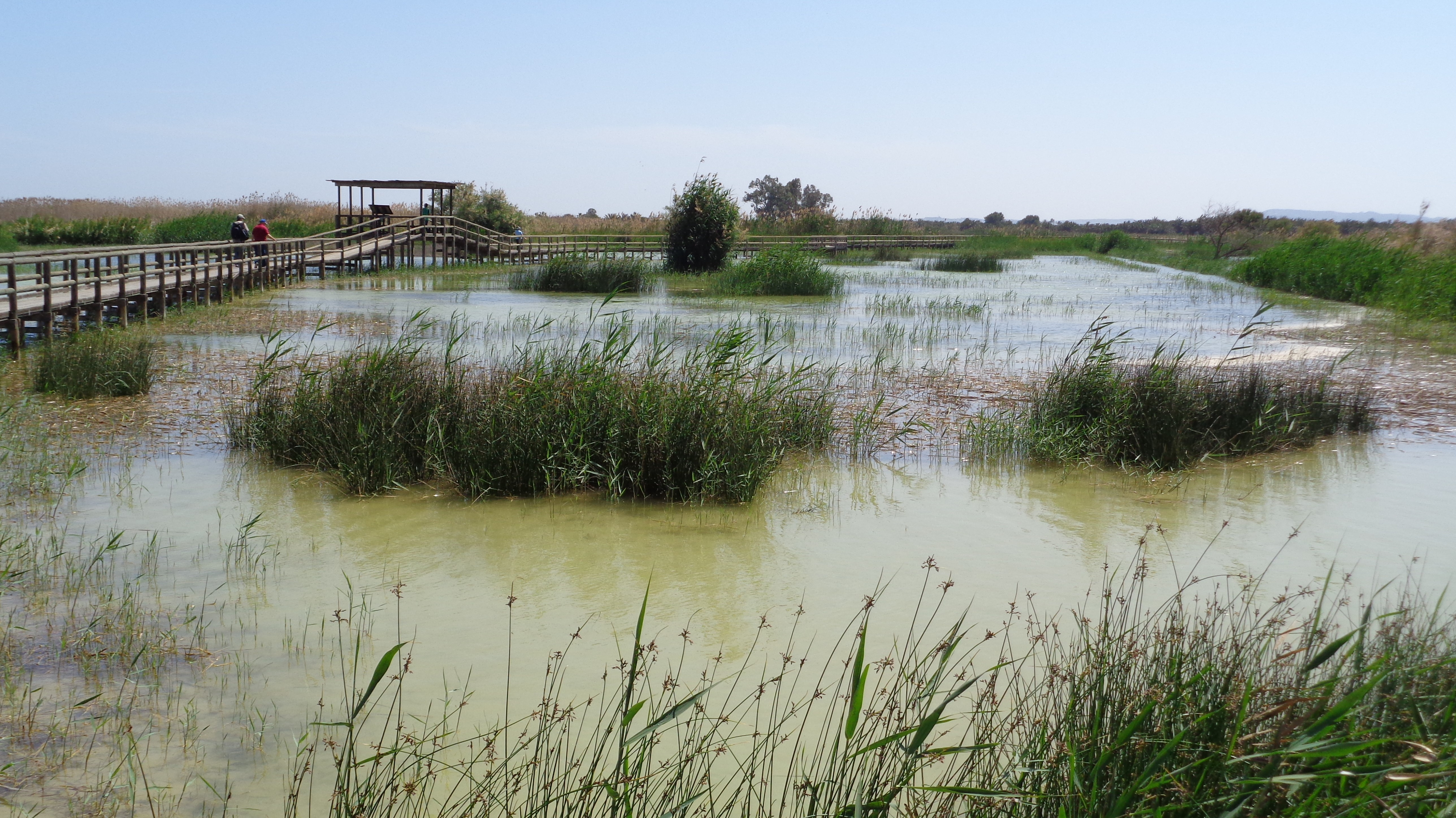
One of the lagoons in El Fondo.

This natural park is formed by a number of lagoons, of which the two largest are manmade and are called Levante, which has a surface area of 450 hectares and Poniente, with an area of 650 hectares. These two lagoons are fed by the waters of the river Segura. El Fondo and the Salinas of Santa Pola as well as the surrounding area formed part of the Albufera of Elche known to the Romans as "Senus Illicitanus". The area of the park was infilled in the 17th century due to natural sedimentation and the placing of silt in order to create new areas for cultivation. At the same time the two largest lagoons were damned to supply water for irrigation.

The natural park has a semi-arid Mediterranean climate due to its location in the south east of the Iberian Peninsula.

== Flora ==
Although the parks habitats are fairly homogeneous it is possible to distinguish two different types of environment relating to the depth and salinity of the water. The reservoirs contain fresher, less saline water with a high degree of eutrophication and therefore there is hardly any submerged vegetation although rushes and reeds are present in the deepest waters. The peripheral pools, are more saline and contain better quality water than the reservoirs and various species typical of salt marsh are present, such as sea lavender, shrubby seablight and glasswort.

== Fauna ==
Various aquatic species exist in the lagoons such as eels, grey mullet, fresh water shrimp and above all the Spanish toothcarp which is endemic to the Spanish Mediterranean region. But without any doubt the parks best known feature is the bird life. The most notable of the many species present in the park are the marbled duck and the white-headed duck with the park containing two of the largest worldwide populations. A large number of herons are present during the breeding season particularly the purple heron, the night heron and the squacco heron. It is also possible to find other species such as the avocet, the black-winged stilt, the collared pratincole, the crested coot, the European penduline tit and the moustached warbler. Birds of prey include osprey, marsh harrier and (in winter) greater spotted eagle. An Estonia-born greater spotted eagle wearing a transmitter has been hibernating in the park and its surroundings each winter since 2008/2009.

== Accessible ==
The park is served by the Alicante-Murcia motorway, with an exit at the Crevillent Station leading to the village of San Felipe Neri.
