= Baix Vinalopó =

Baix Vinalopó Bajo Vinalopó
- Comarca
- Coordinates: 38°15′42″N 00°42′11″W
- Country: Spain
- Autonomous community: Valencian Community
- Province: Alicante / Alacant
- Capital and largest city: Elche / Elx
- Municipalities: 3 municipalities: Elx / Elche, Crevillent, Santa Pola

Area
  - Total: 488.78 km^{2} (188.72 sq mi)

Population (2019)
  - Total: 293,775
  - Density: 601.04/km^{2} (1,556.7/sq mi)
- Time zone: UTC+1 (CET)
  - Summer (DST): UTC+2 (CEST)

The Baix Vinalopó (Valencian: [ˈbajʒ vinaloˈpo], also [ˈbaʒ-]; Spanish: Bajo Vinalopó [ˈbaxo βinaloˈpo]; lit. "Lower Vinalopó") is a comarca in the province of Alicante (Valencian Community, Spain). It is bordered by the comarques of Vinalopó Mitjà and Alacantí on the north and Vega Baja del Segura on the south. Its capital is the city of Elche (Elx in Valencian), with a population of 232,517 in 2019. The other major towns in the comarca are Crevillent and Santa Pola.

Vinalopó river flows through this comarca giving its name to it, even though nowadays is just a tiny stream more than a proper river. The territory is mostly flat except for some of the last ranges belonging to the Baetic System which appear here near the border with the neighbouring comarcas Vinalopó Mitjà, following a general southwest–northeast trend. The highest peaks are found in the Serra de Crevillent, a mountain range close to Crevillent, being its highest the Sant Gaietà with its 816 metres, a local hiking attraction.

Its climate is dry, with scarce rainfalls—below the Mediterranean climate threshold—which happen mostly in Autumn and Spring amounting an average of 250–300 mm per year and showing relatively warm mean temperatures. Among the herbaceous species, esparto and shrub deserve to be mentioned due to their industrial value in the past. Some important natural places are the swamps in the lower part of the comarca known as El Fondo Natural Park and the Salines de Santa Pola Natural Park, both Ramsar sites.

The comarca is highly industrial, especially in its capital, Elche/Elx, and also in the town of Crevillent. Agriculture is also an important activity in the area. In the coastline around Santa Pola the main activity is tourism, fisheries and sea salt.

== Municipalities ==
The comarca contains just three municipalities, listed below with their areas and populations:

| Name | Area in km^{2} | Population (2001) | Population (2011) | Population (2019) |
|---|---|---|---|---|
| Crevillent / Crevillente | 104.55 | 24,786 | 28,269 | 28,952 |
| Elx / Elche | 326.07 | 194,767 | 227,417 | 232,517 |
| Santa Pola | 58.16 | 19,782 | 32,454 | 32,306 |
| Totals | 488.78 | 239,335 | 288,140 | 293,775 |

Municipalities of Baix Vinalopó

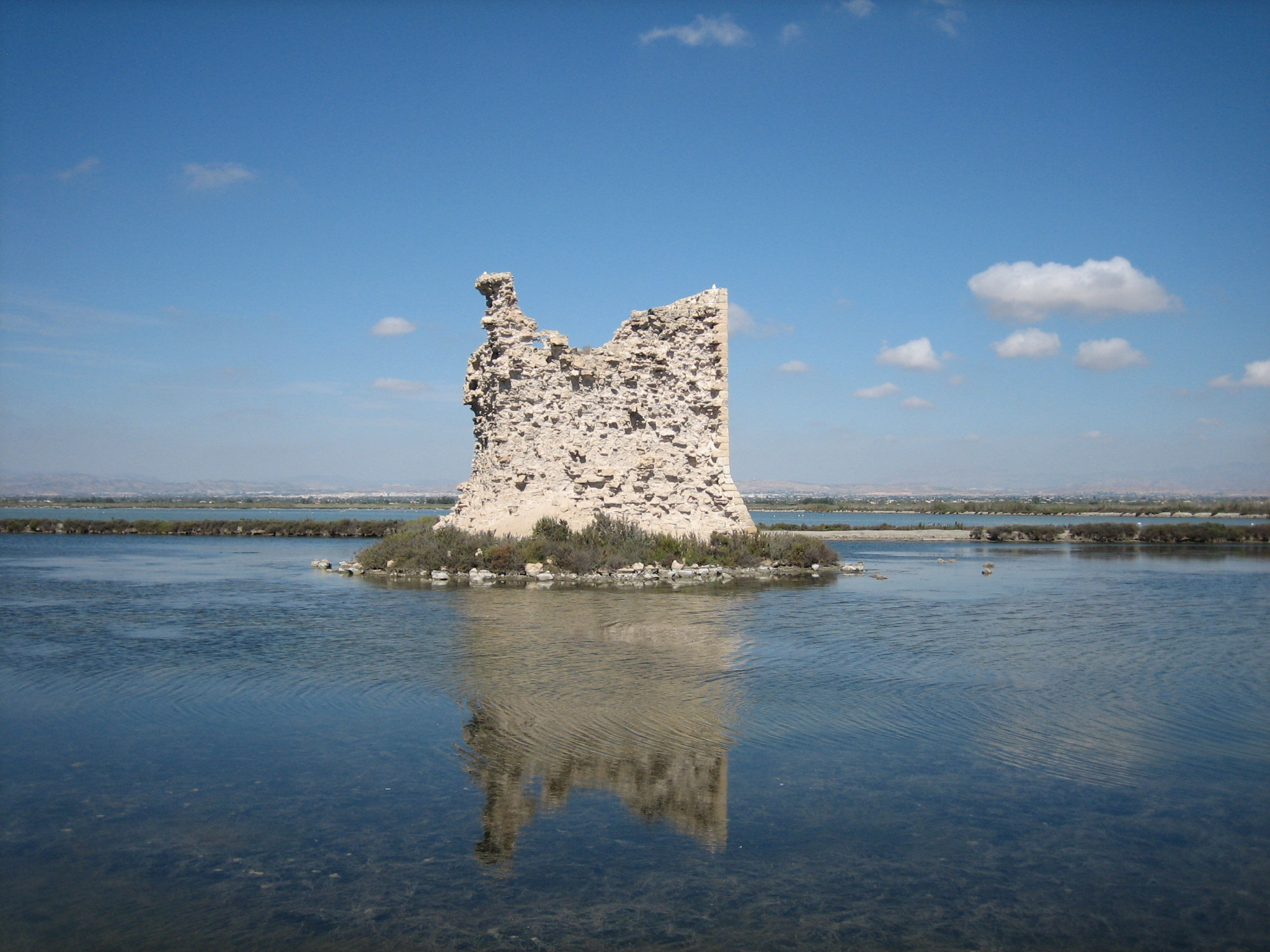
Torre de Tamarit in Salines de Santa Pola Natural Park
