= Algueña =

Algueña L'Alguenya
- Municipality
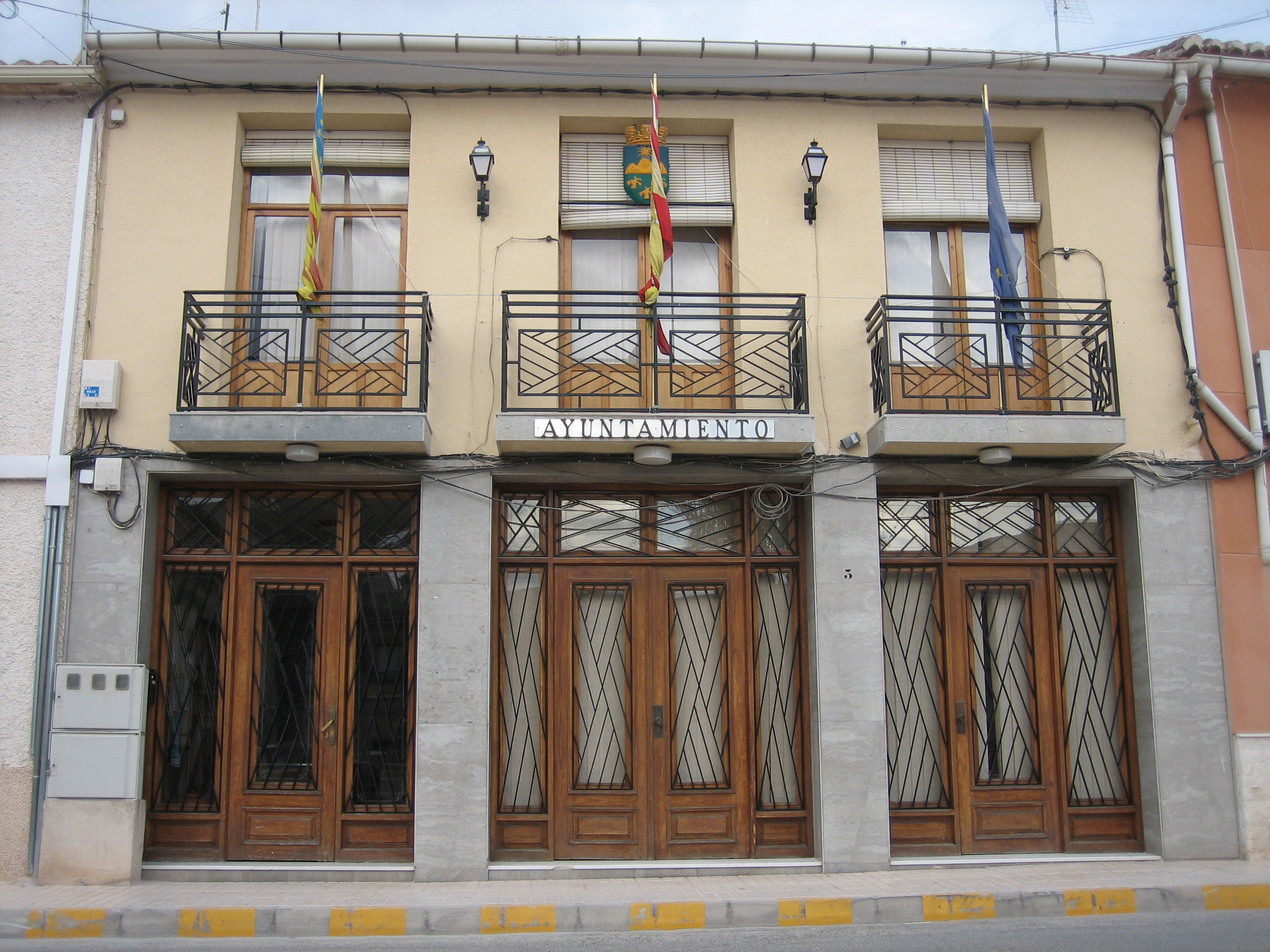
- Town Hall of Algueña.

- Coat of arms

- Location in Spain.
- Coordinates: 38°20′16″N 01°00′13″W
- Country: Spain
- Autonomous communities of Spain: Valencian Community
- Province: Alicante
- Comarca: Vinalopó Mitjà

Government
  - Mayor: Carmen Jover Pérez (PP)

Area
  - Total: 18.43 km^{2} (7.12 sq mi)
- Elevation: 534 m (1,752 ft)

Population (2025-01-01)
  - Total: 1,328
  - Density: 72.06/km^{2} (186.6/sq mi)
  - Language: Spanish; Valencian
- Demonyms: Algueñeros (Spanish); Alguenyers (Valencian)
- Postcode: 03668
- Website: http://www.alguenya.es/

Algueña (Spanish: [alˈɣeɲa]; Valencian: L'Alguenya [lalˈɣeɲa]) is a Valencian municipality located in the Alicante province, in the comarca of Vinalopó Mitjà, Spain. Its climate is arid Mediterranean.

== Geography ==
Algueña is located in the extreme West of Medio Vinalopó, on the border of the old Kingdom of Murcia. The district occupies a high plateau with mid altitudes around 600 m, hilly to the North because of the Reclot mountain range. The district includes the city population center as well as the village of La Solana at 3 km from the town.

== History ==
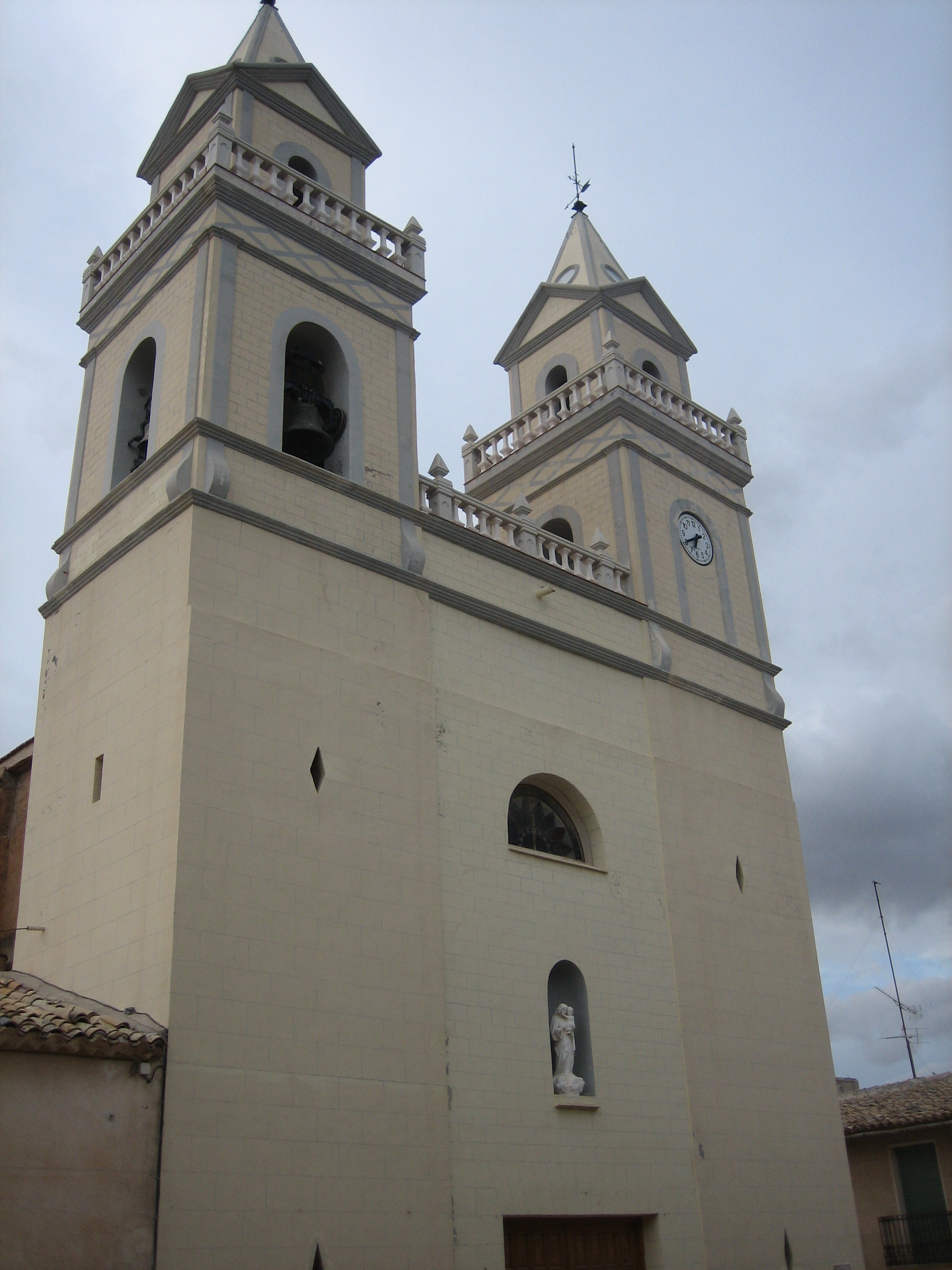
Parish Church of San José, in Algueña

The first reference to Algueña, then called Alhenya, is a date in a lawsuit in the year 1582 between the lordships of Monòver and Novelda.

The population was linked to the municipality of Pinoso until 1934, although it previously already had an independent parish. In this year it obtained municipal independence due to the strong demographic growth experience during the last years of the 19th and beginnings of the 20th centuries (the 1900 census showed a figure of 1,953 inhabitants). Beginning in the 1950s, there was a slow regression until 2005, when Algueña had 1,501 inhabitants.

Algueña (like Pinoso) remained included in the Territory of Orihuela until 1707. In the administrative reform carried out by the Bourbons, it remained equally included in Orihuela's district of corregidor until 1833, the year in which the current provincial system was established.
