= Els Pontets =

Aqueduct in Crevillent, Spain

Coordinates: 38°15′53″N 0°49′31″W

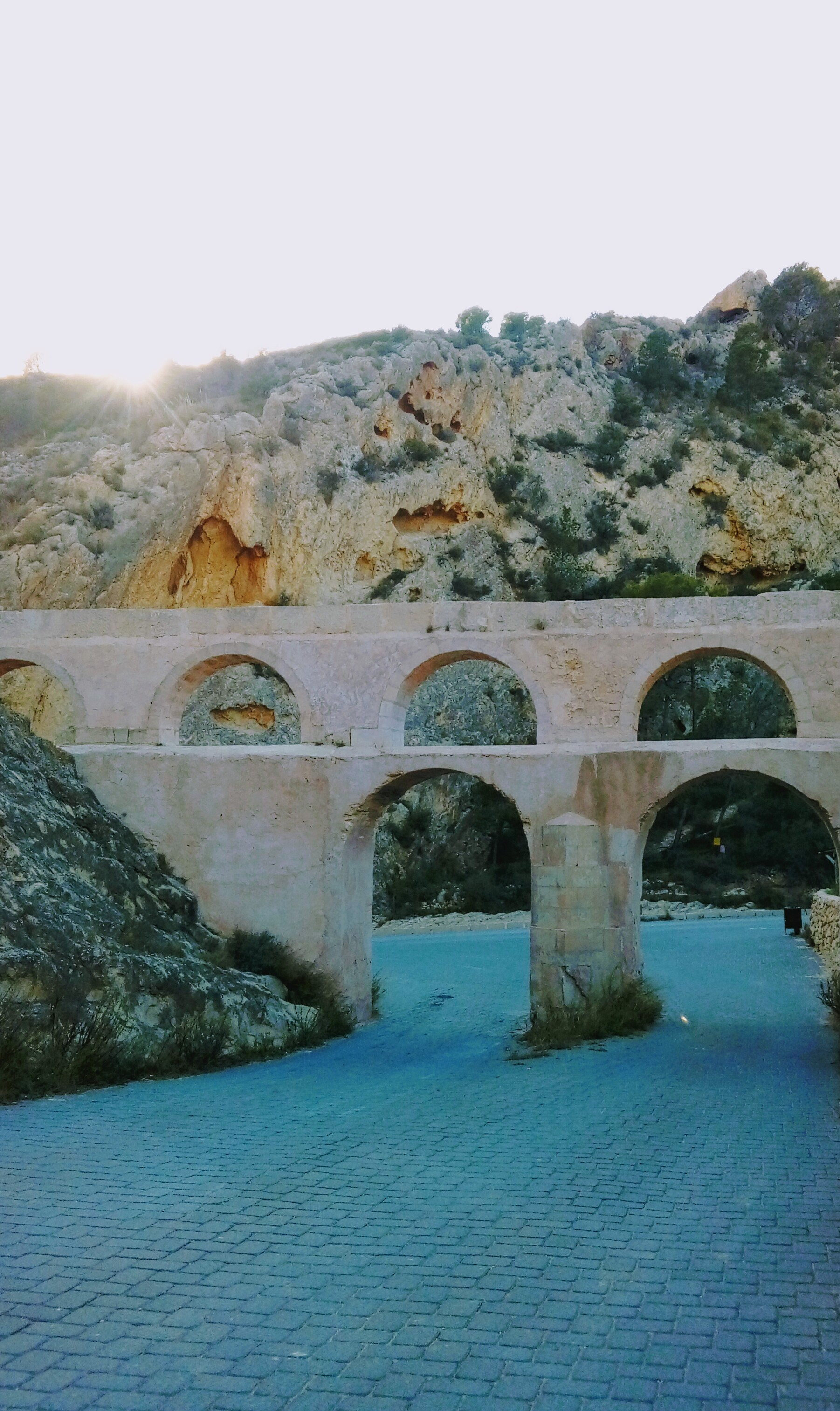
Els Pontets.

Els Pontets is a Spanish aqueduct located in the municipality of Crevillent, Alicante. The aqueduct is part of the qanat that supplied water during the Al-Andalus era to the population from the Sierra de Crevillente. The infrastructure of the aqueduct dates back to the 13th century, although the stone arches only date back to the early 20th century. The facility remained in operation until the second half of the 20th century, when the mine from which the water was extracted was abandoned. Since then, Els Pontets has been in poor condition until 2006, when rehabilitation and urbanization works were carried out in the surrounding area, with an investment of around 150,000 euros.
