= Serra de Crevillent =

Mountain range in southern Spain

- Sierra de Crevillente
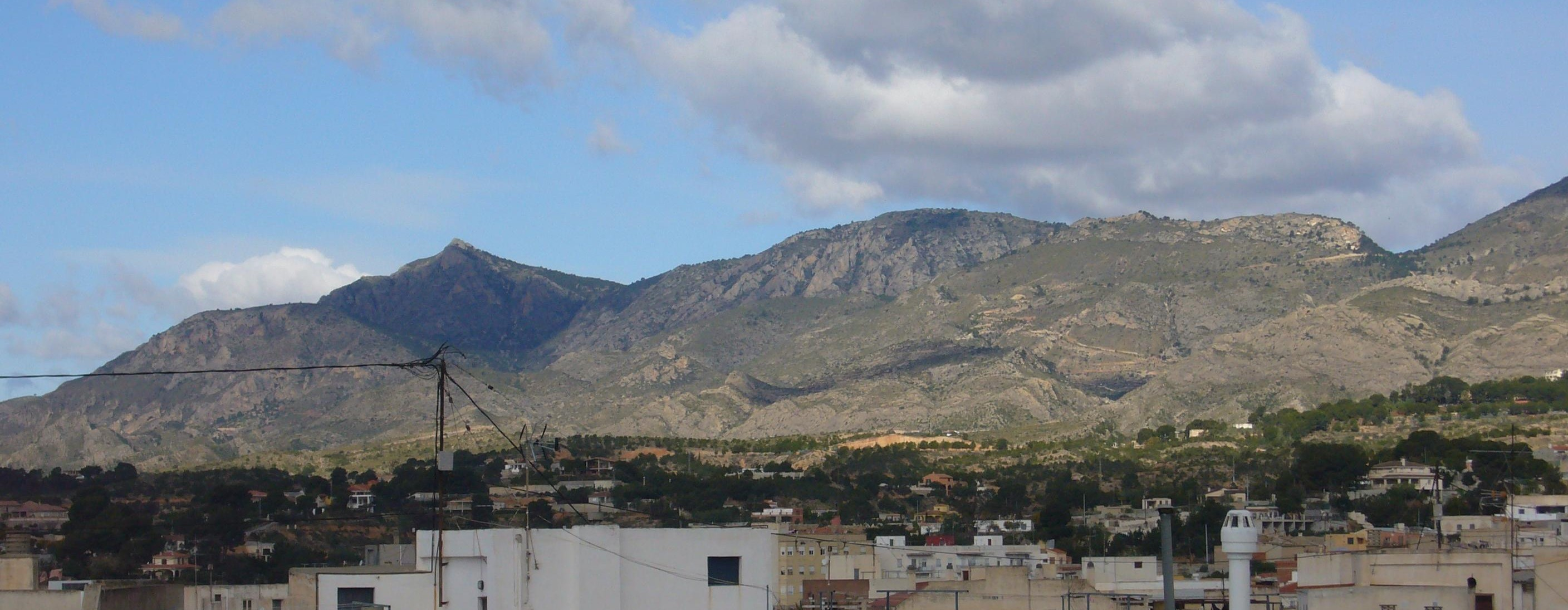

Highest point
- Peak: Sant Gaietà
- Elevation: 835 m (2,740 ft)
- Coordinates: 38°17′01″N 0°50′59″W

Geography
- Location within Spain
- Location: Baix Vinalopó, Valencian Community; Murcia
- Parent range: Prebaetic System, Eastern zone

Geology
- Mountain type: karstic

Climbing
- First ascent: Unknown
- Easiest route: From Crevillent

The Serra de Crevillent (Note: Valencian pronunciation: [ˈsɛra ðe kɾeviˈʎent]) (Spanish: Sierra de Crevillente) is a mountain range in the Baetic System, southern Spain. It spans the region of Murcia and the province of Alicante. The highest peak is Sant Gaietà at 835 metres, near the town of Crevillent.

The Serra de Crevillent is located between the Vinalopó river and the Sierra de Abanilla. The latter is geologically its western prolongation, already within the Region of Murcia.

== Events ==
The archaeological remains found at Ratlla del Bubo site confirm the presence of Solutrean human settlements during the Upper Paleolithic.

During the 13th century, under the Al-Andalus rule, a network of qanats was created to supply water to the population of Crevillent. The most visible element of this infrastructure today is the Els Pontets aqueduct.

In the 19th century, it was the center of the raids of the bandit Jaume el Barbut.

== See also ==
- Mountains of the Valencian Community
