= Aspe =

Town in Valencian community, Spain

- Town
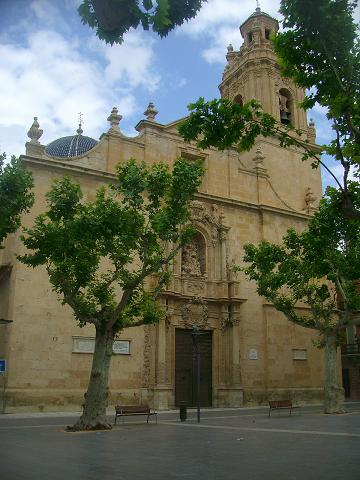
- Basilica of Nuestra Señora del Socorro (17th century).

- Coat of arms

- Location in Spain
- Coordinates: 38°20′44″N 00°46′8″W
- Country: Spain
- Autonomous community: Valencian community
- Province: Alicante
- Comarca: Vinalopó Medio
- Judicial party: Novelda

Government
  - Mayor: Nieves Martínez Berenguer

Area
  - Total: 69.79 km^{2} (26.95 sq mi)
- Elevation: 241 m (791 ft)

Population (2025-01-01)
  - Total: 22,397
  - Density: 320.9/km^{2} (831.2/sq mi)
- Demonyms: Aspenses, Aspencs
- Postcode: 03680
- Language: Spanish
- Website: Official website

Aspe (Spanish pronunciation: [ˈaspe], Valencian: Asp) is a town and municipality located in the comarca of Vinalopó Mitjà, in the province of Alicante, Spain.

The town is located in the valley of the river Vinalopó, 25 km (16 mi) from Alicante city. The economy of Aspe is based on textile and footwear industries, as well as farming of vegetables and fruits.

Aspe is also famous for growing a special kind of grape, which is eaten at the stroke of midnight, every New Year's Eve, all across Spain. The grapes are eaten one at a time, according to the clock striking 12, to signal the new year.

Aspe has a small foreign population, mainly Dutch and English. The local Castilian dialect is known for dropping the "s" and seseo.

Aspe has many traditions and during the summer large fiestas take place. Every other year La Virgen De Las Nieves, the patron of the town, comes to Aspe.

== Main sights ==
- Historical center (casco antiguo)
- Basilica of Nuestra Señora del Socorro (founded in 1602)
- Town Hall (17th century)
- Castillo del Río, a walled settlement located c. 4 km (2.5 mi) outside the town
- Municipal Historical Museum

== Notable people ==
- Rita Josefa Pujalte Sánchez (1858–1936), religious sister, martyr and blessed.
- Samu Martínez (born 1994), footballer.
- Alfredo Juan Mayordomo (born 1984), footballer.
- Manuel Castellano Castro (born 1989), footballer.
- Antonio Prieto (1905–1965), character actor.
