= Fernando Béjar =

Spanish footballer

Personal information
- Full name: Fernando Béjar Durá
- Date of birth: 6 October 1980 (age 46)
- Place of birth: Novelda, Spain
- Height: 1.79 m (5 ft 10 1/2 in)
- Position: Midfielder

Youth career
- Hércules

Senior career*
| Years | Team | Apps | (Gls) |
| 1998–2000 | Hércules B | | |
| 1999–2006 | Hércules | 87 | (9) |
| 2004–2005 | → Villajoyosa (loan) | 31 | (2) |
| 2005–2006 | → Benidorm (loan) | 23 | (8) |
| 2006–2009 | Alicante | 79 | (8) |
| 2009–2010 | Alcorcón | 39 | (5) |
| 2010–2011 | Castellón | 28 | (3) |
| 2011–2012 | Ontinyent | 15 | (1) |
| 2012–2013 | Novelda | 36 | (3) |
| 2013 | Yeclano | 14 | (3) |
| 2013–2015 | Novelda | 10 | (2) |
| Total | | 362 | (44) |
- * Club domestic league appearances and goals

Fernando Béjar Durá (born 6 October 1980) is a Spanish retired footballer who played as a midfielder.

== Club career ==
Béjar was born in Novelda, Province of Alicante. During his career, spent mainly in the lower leagues and with local Hércules CF, he also appeared briefly in Segunda División, twice for Hércules in the 1998–99 season – with relegation – and 14 times for neighbours Alicante CF in the 2008–09 campaign, meeting the same fate.

Over the course of 12 seasons, Béjar amassed Segunda División B totals of 269 games and 35 goals.
