= El Fondó de les Neus =

- Municipality
- El Fondó de les Neus/Hondón de las Nieves
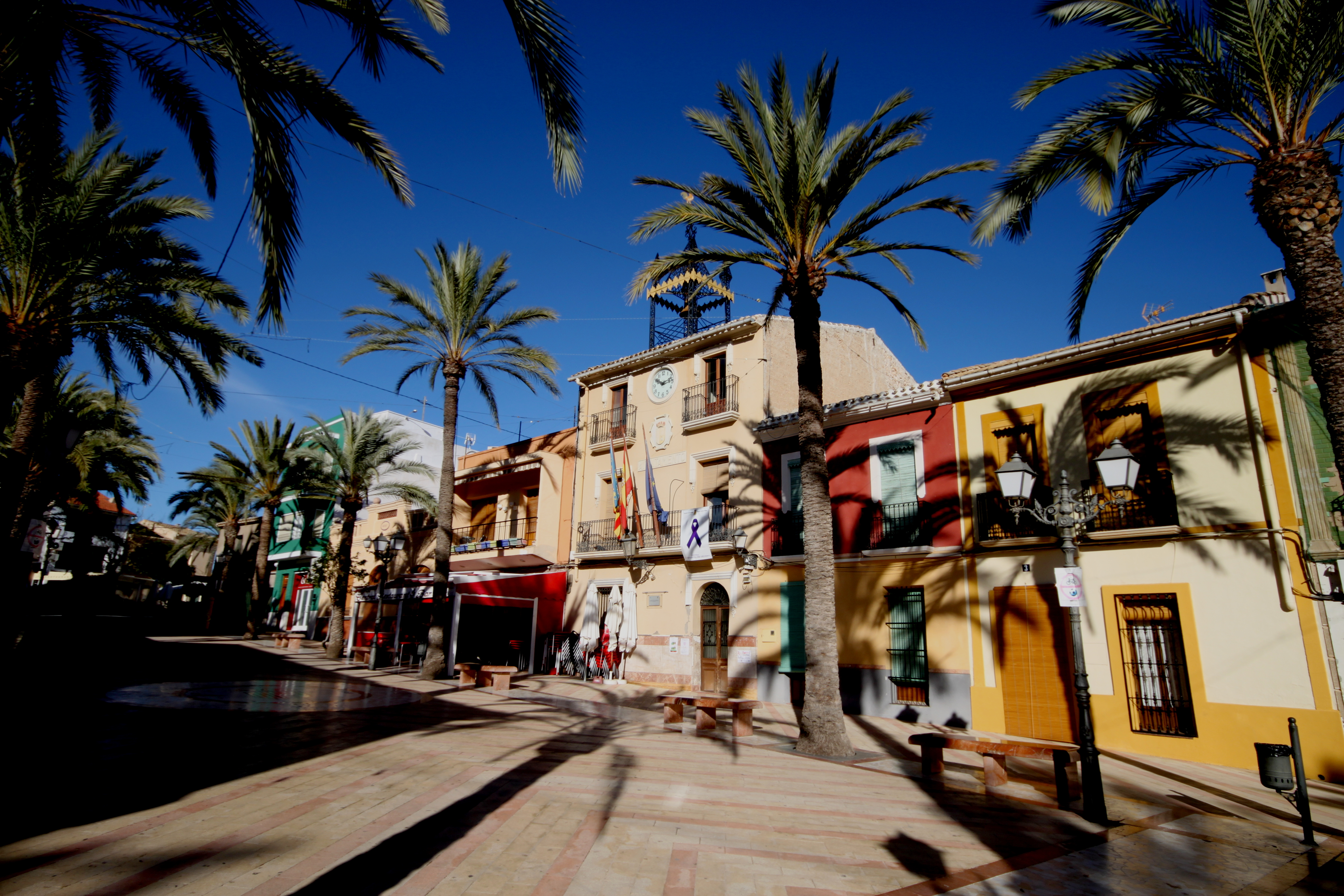
- Town hall

- Coat of arms

- Location in Spain
- Coordinates: 38°18′29″N 0°51′14″W
- Country: Spain
- Autonomous community: Valencian Community
- Province: Alacant
- Comarca: Vinalopó Mitjà
- Judicial district: Novelda

Government
  - Major: Victoriano Sánchez Botella (PP)

Area
  - Total: 68.80 km^{2} (26.56 sq mi)
- Elevation: 380 m (1,250 ft)

Population (2025-01-01)
  - Total: 2,738
  - Density: 39.80/km^{2} (103.1/sq mi)
- Demonym: Fondoners
- Time zone: UTC+1 (CET)
  - Summer (DST): UTC+2 (CEST)
- Postal code: 03688
- Official language(s): Valencian
- Website: Official website

El Fondó de les Neus (Valencian pronunciation: [el fonˈdo ðe lez ˈnɛws]; Spanish: Hondón de las Nieves [onˈdon de las ˈnjeβes]) is a municipality in the comarca of Vinalopó Mitjà in the Valencian Community, Spain.

It is a small village, inland, west of the Alicante province. Its nearest city is Elche (Elx) to the south east or Crevillent. The name literally means "Gorge of the Snow", a reference to the village's patron "The Virgin of the Snow". This effigy and the church is at the heart of village life.
