= Juan Pascual Azorín Soriano =

Spanish politician (born 1951)

Juan Pascual Azorín Soriano (born 6 August 1951, Yecla) is a Spanish politician. At the moment, he is the mayor of Elda and senator for Alicante in the Spanish Senate. He belongs to PSPV-PSOE.

He moved with his family to Elda at the age of eighteen months. In 1983 he was chosen town councillor in the lists of the Independent candidates of Elda (Candidatura Independiente de Elda) and later he joined the PSOE. In 1985 he was appointed General Secretary of the Unión General de Trabajadores, a trade union historically linked to the PSPV-PSOE in the comarca of Alt Vinalopó. As town councillor he occupied the post of Personnel and Industry, until in 1996 he held the post of Mayor of Elda. He was also President of PSPV-PSOE too.

At the 1996 General Election he was placed seventh on the PSPV-PSOE list for Alicante Province. With the party winning just five seats he failed to be elected, however as the PSPV-PSOE's second substitute he joined the Congress in 1999 as substitute for Pedro Solbes. He was not reelected at the 2000 General Election but was elected to the Senate at the 2004 General Election, retaining his seat at the 2008 General Election.

In the Senate he has held various posts such as First Vice president in the Industry, Tourism and Commerce Commission, and First Secretary in the Local Entities Commission, and he is President of Honour in the Commercial Institute of Alicante.
