= Álvaro García (footballer, born 1986) =

Spanish footballer

Personal information
- Full name: Álvaro García Cantó
- Date of birth: 7 July 1986 (age 40)
- Place of birth: La Romana, Spain
- Height: 1.68 m (5 ft 6 in)
- Position: Winger

Youth career
- 1994–2000: Aspe UD
- 2000–2001: Valencia
- 2001–2003: Aspe UD
- 2003–2004: Alicante

Senior career*
Years	Team	Apps	(Gls)
2004–2005	Alicante B		
2004–2009	Alicante	107	(7)
2009	Cádiz	11	(1)
2009	Racing Ferrol	10	(0)
2010	Alzira	22	(2)
2010–2011	Novelda	21	(5)
2011–2012	Alcoyano	63	(16)
2012–2013	Asteras Tripolis	1	(0)
2013	Cartagena	13	(1)
2013–2015	Leganés	74	(7)
2015	Huracán	14	(3)
2016	Hércules	22	(2)
2016–2018	Alcoyano	59	(2)
2018–2019	Intercity	30	(4)
2019–2020	Novelda	20	(6)
2020–2021	Atlético Benidorm	21	(4)
2021–2022	Aspe UD	30	(9)
Total		518	(69)
- * Club domestic league appearances and goals

Álvaro García Cantó (born 7 July 1986 in La Romana, Alicante, Valencian Community) is a Spanish former professional footballer who played as a left winger.
