= Elda =

- City and municipality
- Flag Coat of arms
- Interactive map of Elda
- Location within Province of Alicante Location within Valencian Community Location within Spain
- Coordinates: 38°28′44″N 0°47′48″W
- Country: Spain
- Autonomous Community: Valencian Community
- Province: Alicante
- Comarca: Vinalopó Mitjà
- Judicial district: Elda

Government
  - Alcalde (Mayor): Rubén Alfaro Bernabé (PSPV-PSOE)

Area
  - City and municipality: 44.86 km^{2} (17.32 sq mi)
- Elevation: 395 m (1,296 ft)

Population (2025-01-01)
  - City and municipality: 55,222
  - Density: 1,231/km^{2} (3,188/sq mi)
  - Urban: 100,000
- Demonyms: eldense (Sp.) elder, -a (Val.)
- Official language(s): Spanish; Valencian
- Linguistic area: Spanish
- Postcode: 03600
- Website: Official website

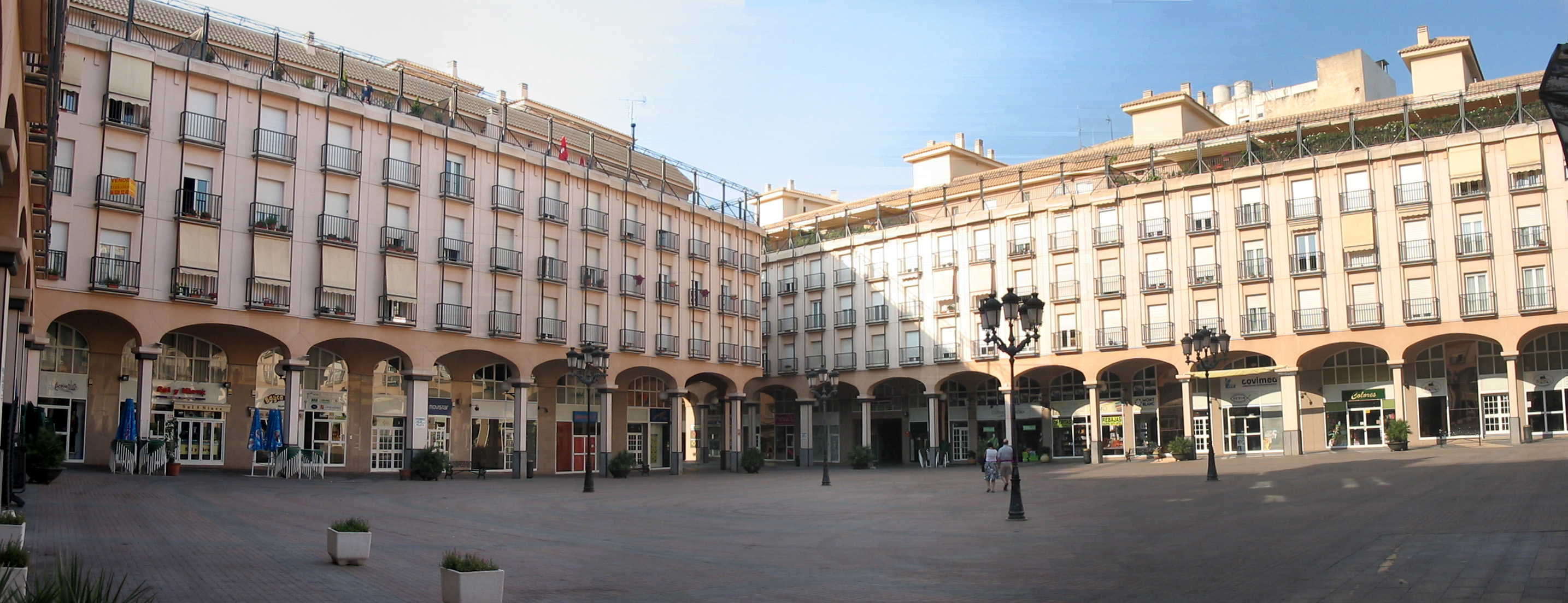
Plaza Mayor

Elda (Note: Pronunciation of Elda: Spanish: [ˈelda] Valencian: [ˈɛlda], also [ˈɛldɛ]) is a city and municipality located in the province of Alicante, in the Valencian Community, Spain. As of 2009, it has a total population of 55,618 inhabitants, ranking as the 7th most populous city in the province. Elda joins together with the town of Petrer to form a conurbation with nearly 100,000 inhabitants. The river Vinalopó flows through the urban area of Elda.

Elda is known for its footwear industry, in particular for women's shoes. Tourist sites include the Footwear Museum, the Archaeological Museum, the Torre del Homenaje del castillo (a tower dating from the 12th century), Castelar Square, Count of Coloma Palace, the Town Hall and the church of Santa Ana. It also celebrates the important festival of Moros y Cristianos (Moors and Christians).

Spanish is the main language of the city, however in neighbouring Petrer the main language is Valencian.

== Sport ==
CD Eldense is based in the city.

The local handball team CBF Elda has won the Spanish women's Championship 4 times and the Spanish Cup twice.

== People ==
- Manuel Arellano, the economist, was born here in 1957
- Elia Barceló, the writer, was born here in 1957
- Ana Oncina the illustrator, was born here in 1989
- Isabel Ortuño, handballer, was born here in 1982
- Pedrito Rico, singer, actor and dancer
- Alba Rico, Spanish singer and actress from Violetta, was born here in 1989.
- Juan Pascual Azorín Soriano, former mayor
- Antonio Gades, 1936 flamenco dancer

== See also ==
- Route of the Castles of Vinalopó
