= Rita Josefa Pujalte Sánchez =

Spanish religious sister, martyr and blessed (1853–1936)

Blessed Rita Josefa Pujalte Sánchez Martyr
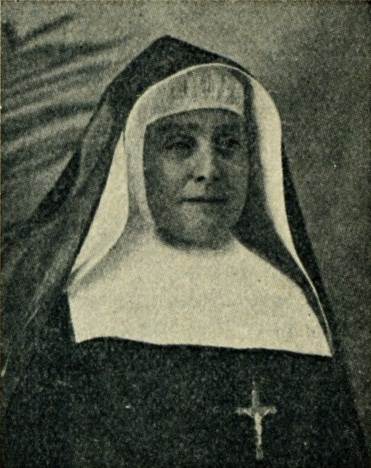
- Pujalte pictured on an unknown date
- Born: 18 February 1853; Aspe, Spain
- Died: 20 July 1936 (aged 83); Canillejas, Spain
- Venerated in: Roman Catholic Church
- Beatified: 10 May 1998, Saint Peter's Square, Vatican City by Pope John Paul II
- Feast: 20 July

Rita Josefa Pujalte Sánchez also known by her religious name as Rita of Our Lady of Sorrows (18 February 1853 – 20 July 1936) was a Spanish religious sister and superior general from the Sisters of Charity of the Sacred Heart of Jesus. She was executed during the early days of the Spanish Civil War, and was subsequently declared a martyr and beatified by Pope John Paul II in 1998.

== Life ==
She was born on 18 February 1853 in Aspe, province of Alicante, Spain into a well-to-do and pious Catholic family, as the daughter of Antonio Pujalte and Luisa Sánchez. Pujalte was a catechist and belonged to the Daughters of Mary, the Third Order Regular of Saint Francis of Penance and the Society of St Vincent de Paul. In 1888 she joined the Sisters of Charity of the Sacred Heart of Jesus and took the name Rita de los Dolores; she took her vows on 21 June 1890. Her sister was also a nun in that congregation.

In 1891, Pujalte became prioress of the College of Santa Susana in Madrid. In 1894, she was transferred to the college in Fuensalida, province of Toledo, where she was appointed novice mistress in 1896. She was also vicar general. In 1900, she was appointed superior general of the congregation following the death of Isabel Larrañaga Ramírez, its founder, the previous year and who recommended Pujalte as her successor. During those years, the congregation opened several schools and educational centres for women. After 28 uninterrupted years as superior general, in 1928 Pujalte stepped down from the post for health reasons and returned to the College of Santa Susana.

== Execution ==
With the outbreak of the Spanish Civil War and the religious persecution on 18 July 1936, the nuns refused to abandon the orphans in their care. Two days later, on 20 July, left-wing soldiers stormed the College whilst the nuns were gathered in prayer in a chapel. The prioress of the community asked the soldiers to let two of them go; Pujalte, who was blind, ill and elderly, and her nurse Francisca Aldea Araujo were the ones who managed to escape.

Pujalte and Aldea were taken to a neighbouring house until, two hours later, the soldiers appeared, arrested them, dragged them down the stairs and put them in a van to the outskirts of Madrid, to Canillejas, where they were executed.

Both bodies were exhumed in 1940, found incorrupt, and transferred to the Cementerio de la Almudena in Madrid, and in 1954 they were moved to a chapel at a school run by their congregation in Villaverde.

== Beatification ==
The process began in 1954. On 7 July 1997 Pope John Paul II recognised her martyrdom and that of Aldea by decree of the Congregation for the causes of saints, recognising both as Venerable.

Both were beatified on 10 May 1998 by Pope John Paul II in Saint Peter's Square, together with eight other nuns who were martyred during the Civil War, their commemorative day being 20 July.
