= Máyor (footballer) =

Spanish footballer

Personal information
- Full name: Alfredo Juan Mayordomo
- Date of birth: 23 January 1984 (age 42)
- Place of birth: Aspe, Spain
- Height: 1.86 m (6 ft 1 in)
- Position: Forward

Youth career
- Hércules

Senior career*
Years	Team	Apps	(Gls)
2002–2004	Hércules B		
2004–2005	Hércules	26	(4)
2005–2006	Benidorm	32	(4)
2006–2007	Lleida	26	(1)
2007–2008	Villajoyosa	30	(6)
2008–2009	Ontinyent	32	(7)
2009–2010	Sant Andreu	34	(21)
2010–2013	Ponferradina	112	(23)
2013–2014	Las Palmas	13	(1)
2014–2016	Alcorcón	71	(8)
2016–2018	Reus	56	(9)
2018–2019	Castellón	15	(0)
2019	Burgos	14	(0)
2019–2020	Badalona	15	(0)
2020–2022	Xerez Deportivo	51	(13)
2022–2023	Jove Español	23	(1)
Total		550	(98)
- * Club domestic league appearances and goals

Alfredo Juan Mayordomo (born 23 January 1984 in Aspe, Province of Alicante), commonly known as Máyor, is a Spanish former professional footballer who played as a forward.
