= Vinalopó Mitjà =

Coordinates: 38°28′41″N 0°47′24″W

Vinalopó Mitjà Vinalopó Medio
- Comarca
- Country: Spain
- Autonomous community: Valencian Community
- Province: Alacant / Alicante
- Capital and largest city: Elda
- Municipalities: 11 municipalities: L'Alguenya / Algueña, Aspe, Elda, El Fondó de les Neus / Hondón de las Nieves, El Fondó dels Frares / Hondón de los Frailes, Monforte del Cid, Monòver, Novelda, Petrer / Petrel, Pinoso / El Pinós, La Romana

Area
  - Total: 798.60 km^{2} (308.34 sq mi)

Population (2019)
  - Total: 169,069
  - Density: 211.71/km^{2} (548.32/sq mi)
- Time zone: UTC+1 (CET)
  - Summer (DST): UTC+2 (CEST)

Vinalopó Mitjà (Valencian: [vinaloˈpo miˈdʒa]; Spanish: Vinalopó Medio [binaloˈpo ˈmeðjo]; lit. "Middle Vinalopó") is a comarca in the province of Alicante, Valencian Community, Spain.

== Municipalities ==
The comarca comprises eleven municipalities, listed below with their areas and populations:

Name	Area in km^{2}	Population (2001)	Population (2011)	Population (2019)
L'Alguenya / Algueña	18.50	1,453	1,506	1,336
Aspe	70.90	16,631	20,186	20,714
Elda	45.80	51,593	54,357	52,618
El Fondó de les Neus / Hondón de las Nieves	68.80	1,660	2,731	2,544
El Fondó dels Frares / Hondón de los Frailes	12.60	622	1,109	1,198
Monforte del Cid	79.50	5,576	7,749	8,165
Monòver	152.40	11,763	12,683	12,167
Novelda	75.70	24,800	26,573	25,651
Petrer / Petrel	104.20	30,138	34,690	34,276
El Pinós / Pinoso	126.90	6,370	7,742	7,966
La Romana	43.30	2,044	2,463	2,434
Totals	798.60	152,650	171,789	169,069

Valencian municipalities in the comarca of Vinalopó Mitjà
