= Hondón de los Frailes =

Municipality and village in Spain

Coordinates: 38°16′N 0°55′W

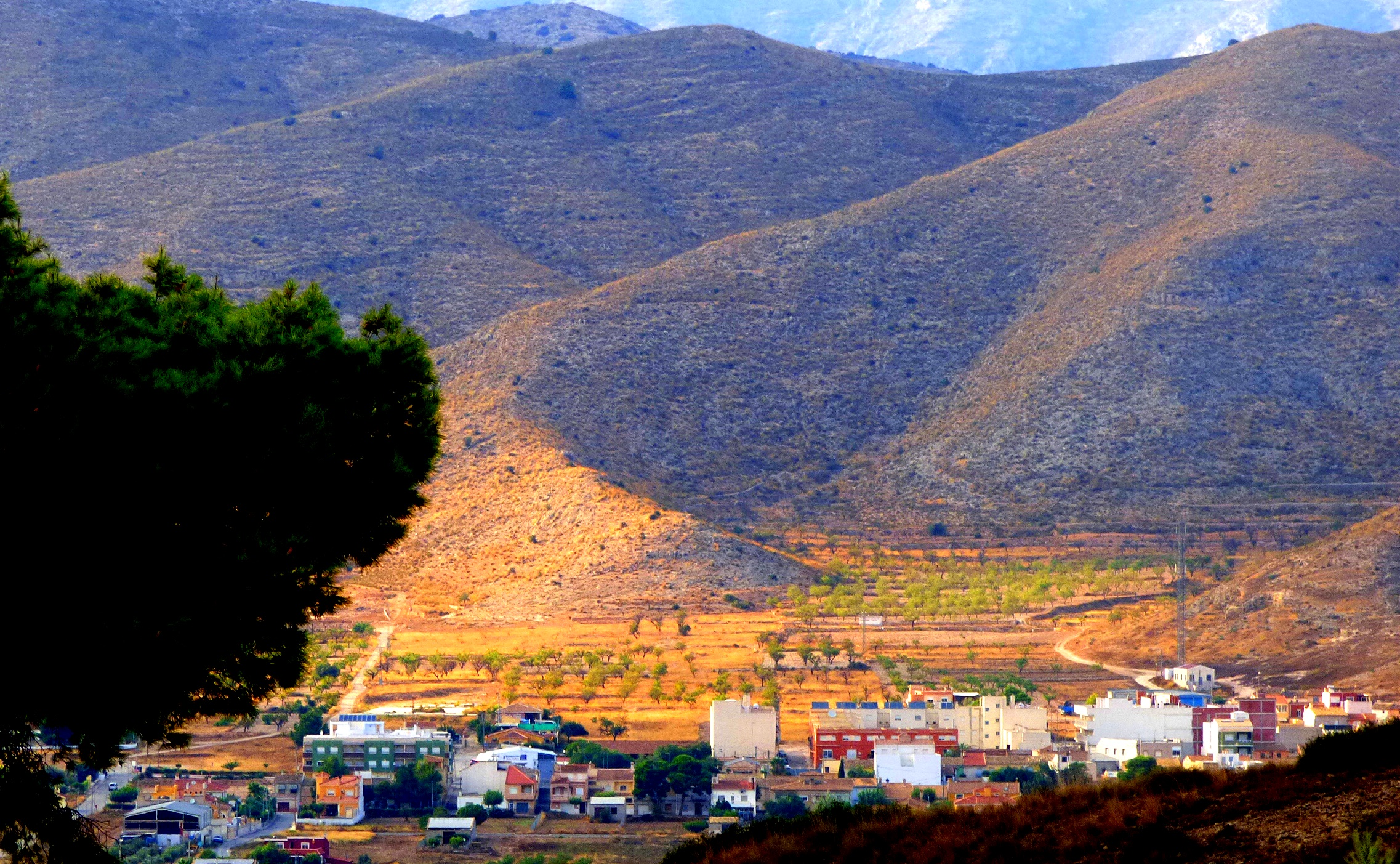

Hondón de los Frailes's coat of arms

Hondón de los Frailes (Valencian: El Fondó dels Frares) is a municipality and village in the province of Alicante and autonomous community of Valencia, Spain. The municipality covers an area of 12.6 square kilometres (4.9 sq mi) and as of 2018 had a population of 1132 people.
