= Monòver =

- Municipality
- Monóvar
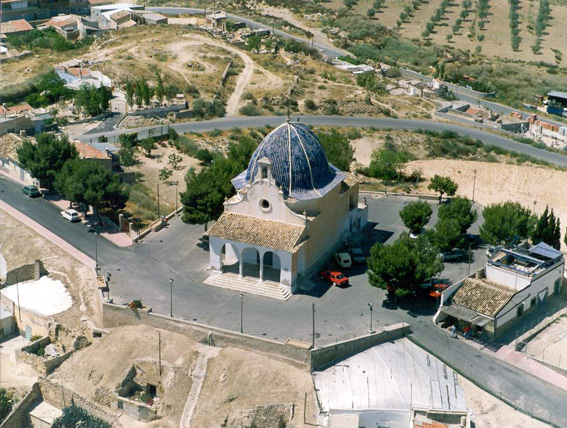
- Hermitage of Sta. Bàrbara.

- Coat of arms

- Location in Spain
- Coordinates: 38°26′13″N 0°50′17″W
- Country: Spain
- Autonomous community: Valencian Community
- Province: Alacant/Alicante
- Comarca: Vinalopó Mitjà
- Judicial district: Novelda

Government
  - Mayor: Natxo Vidal (2014) (PSPV/PSOE)

Area
  - Total: 152 km^{2} (59 sq mi)
- Elevation: 341 m (1,119 ft)

Population (2025-01-01)
  - Total: 13,116 + 2
  - Density: 86.3/km^{2} (223/sq mi)
- Demonym(s): monoveres/monovers (Catalan), monoveras/monoveros (Spanish)
- Time zone: UTC+1 (CET)
  - Summer (DST): UTC+2 (CEST)
- Postal code: 03640
- Official language(s): Catalan; Valencian
- Website: Official website

Monòver (Valencian pronunciation: [moˈnɔveɾ], locally [muˈnɔve]; Spanish: Monóvar [moˈnoβaɾ]) is a municipality in the comarca of Vinalopó Mitjà in the Valencian Community, Spain.
