= Santa Pola =

- Town and municipality
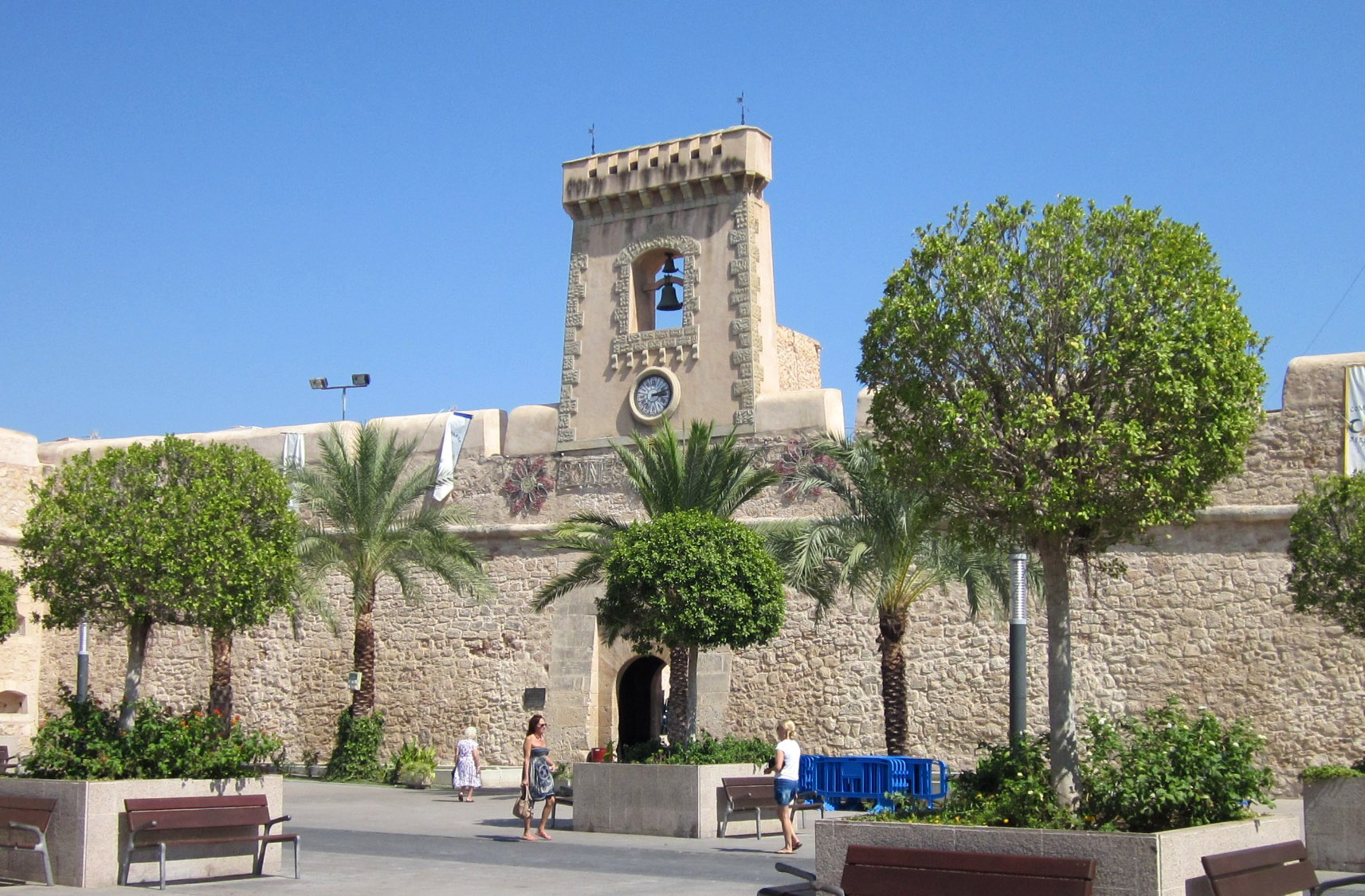
- Fortress Castle of Santa Pola

- Flag Coat of arms

- Location of Santa Pola Santa Pola (Valencian Community) Santa Pola (Spain)
- Coordinates: 38°11′23″N 0°33′20″W
- Country: Spain
- Autonomous community: Valencian Community
- Province: Alicante
- Comarca: Baix Vinalopó

Government
  - Body: Ajuntament
  - Alcaldessa (Mayoress): Loreto Serrano Pomares (PP)

Area
  - Total: 58.6 km^{2} (22.6 sq mi)
- Elevation: 6 m (20 ft)

Population (2022)
  - Total: 37 816
  - Density: 65,020/km^{2} (168,400/sq mi)
- Demonyms: santapoler, -a (Val.) santapolero/a, also icositano/a (Sp.)
- Official language(s): Valencian; Spanish
- Linguistic area: Valencian
- Postal code: 03130
- Website: www.santapola.es

Santa Pola (Note: Pronunciation of Santa Pola: Valencian: [ˈsanta ˈpola] Spanish: [ˈsanta ˈpola]) is a coastal town and municipality located in the comarca of Baix Vinalopó in the Valencian Community, Spain, by the Mediterranean Sea. It has an area of 58.6 km^{2} (23 sq mi) and has a population of 36,174 inhabitants of whom 6,000 are residents of the nearby town of Gran Alacant.

The town has an important salt evaporation pond known as the salines which remains in business, additionally, most of it is recognized as the Natural Park of Salines de Santa Pola, an important Ramsar site. The town was settled over the ruins of a Roman village called Portus Illicitanus (literally, "Harbour of Elche"); after being abandoned for decades, then a castle was constructed in the 16th century which marked the repopulation of Santa Pola. The town has an archeological museum covering these phases.

Santa Pola is, at present, a coastal fishing and tourist town. Population more than doubles during the summer, with people coming mostly from the rest of the Alicante province, and also from the Basque Country, Madrid, France and the UK, just to mention some. The nearby island of Tabarca (part of Alicante) can be visited by ship.

The new town of Gran Alacant, 5 km (3 mi) north of Santa Pola along the Alicante bay, accounts for about one third of the population of the district. Next to it is the Carabasi area, a nature reserve. Gran Alacant lies only a few kilometres from Alicante Airport and a few hundred metres from the town of Los Arenales which is located in the Elche district.

In June 2009, the Valencian Government announced that the Alicante Tram system will be extended southwards via Alicante Airport and El Altet, to stations in Gran Alacant and Santa Pola and then onwards to Guardamar and Torrevieja before terminating in Murcia.

== Etymology ==
The name is derived from Saint Paula, itself derived from Saint Paul the apostle, who arrived at Tabarca island, as tradition holds. However, it is likely that the name comes from Latin palus, thence pauls, finally pol.

== History ==
The first settlements in the area remount to the third millennium BC, proof of which have been tools and paintings from the Neolithic found in the Cueva de las Arañas del Carabassí, as well as remains found from hunter-gatherers of the Palaeolithic in the Cueva de las Teresitas.

During the fourth century BCE, a small walled settlement was built near Vanalopó river. It served mainly as a Greek-Iberia economical hub. During the first century CE, near the former site a port was built, serving the city of Illici, named Portus Illicitanus (Greek: Ἰλλικιτάνος Λιμήν) (cited by Claudius Ptolemy in Geography).

This port proved paramount for the development of the region's maritime commerce, together with Cartagena's. In 460 AC, emperor Majorians flotilla set sail to attack north African vandals, but was burnt at that same port. From the Roman settlement a necropolis is still in place, as well as a fish-salting factory and the Roman House of Palmeral. Their remains are described as back as 1621 by Cristòfol Sanz, although they were excavated during the 20th century.

== Economics ==
Economical activity in this region is based on agriculture, craft-making and fishing. 1.3% of the population was dedicated to agriculture in 2003, and that's only successful when coupled with artificial watering systems, needed for the 200 hectares of orange trees (102ha), mandarin trees (74ha), and pomegranate trees (18ha), together with 230ha used for vegetables such as melons, shallots, broccoli, etc.

== Transport ==
The following roads run through the municipality of Santa Pola:

CV-92: Former N-332, connects El Altet with the AP-7 near Pilar de la Horadada. CV-851: Connects El Altet with Elche. CV-865: Connects Santa Pola with Elche.

== Languages ==
According to article 35 of law n° 4/1983 (23 November), Santa Pola's official language is Valencian, together with Spanish (Spanish Constitution, article n°3, 1978). INE's latest census shows that 90% of the population speaks Valencian. There has been an increased trend in the influx of new language influences, in part due to immigration patterns in the region. This has caused suburbs such as Gran Alacant to have a significant population of English speakers.

== Gallery ==
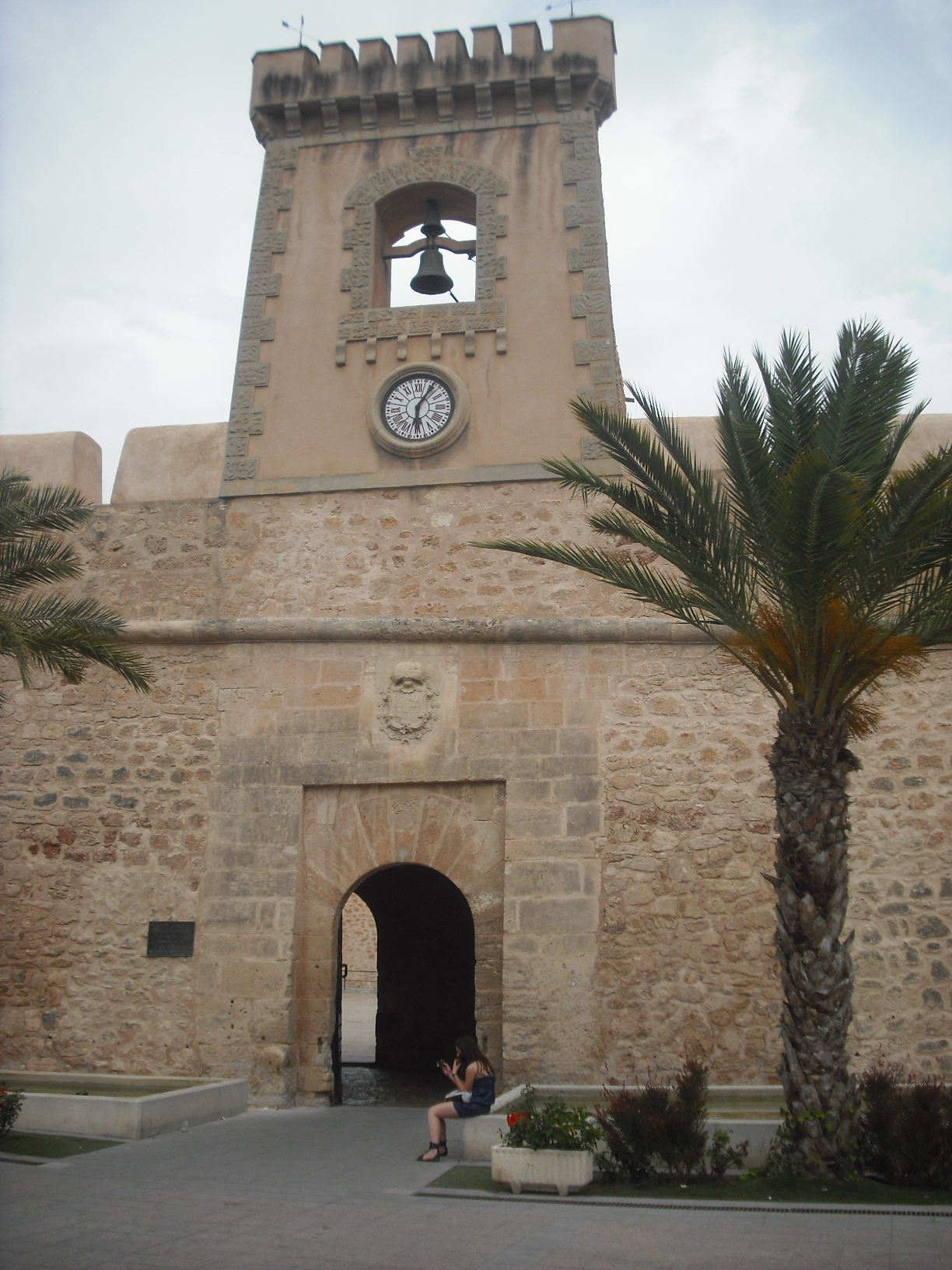
Door to Castle of Santa Pola

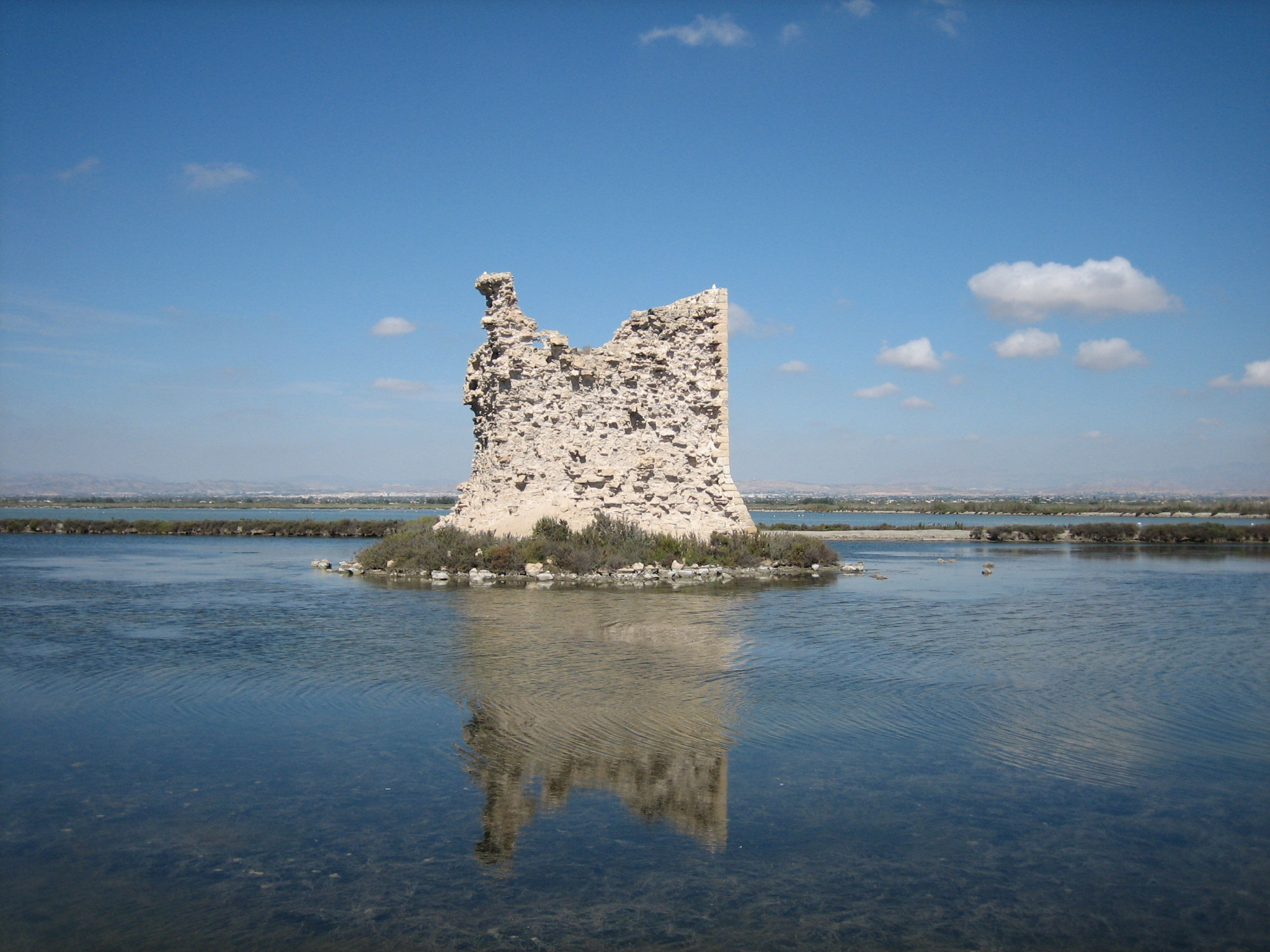
Tamarit Tower

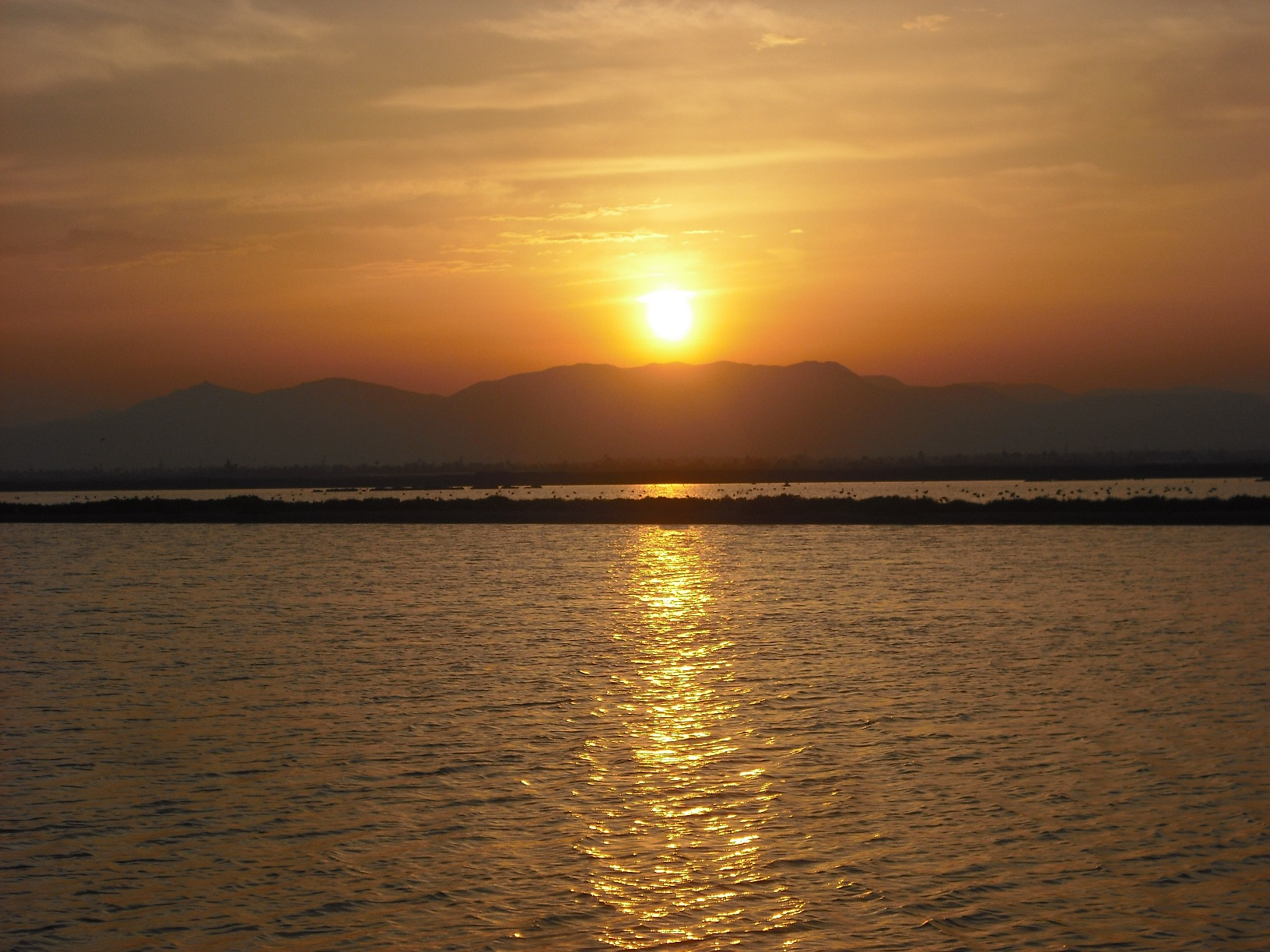
Sunset at las Salinas

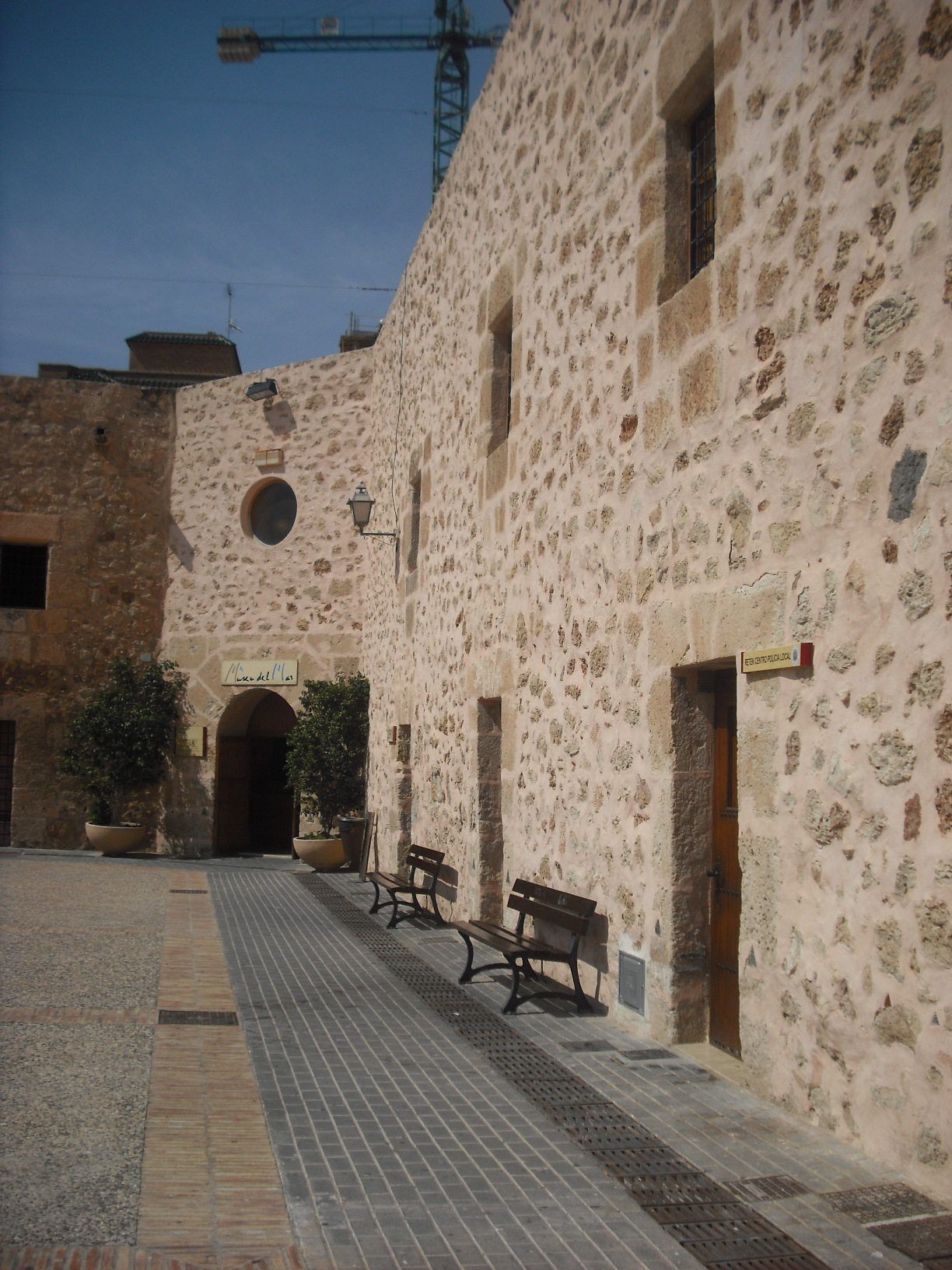
Castle of Santa Pola, Maritime Museum
