= Crevillent =

Crevillent Crevillente
- Town and municipality
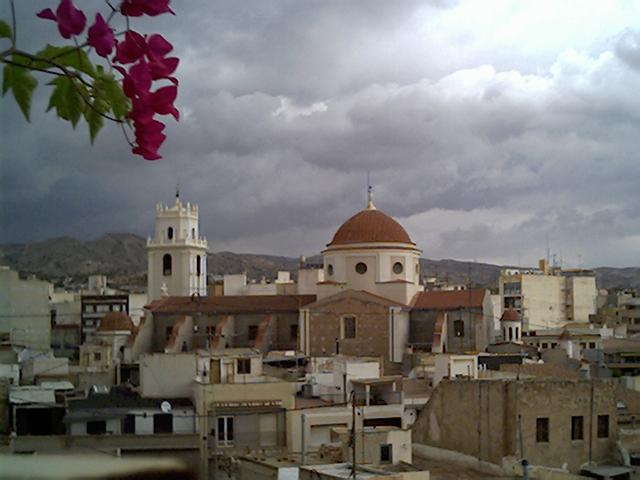
- Church of Mare de Déu de Betlem

- Flag Coat of arms

- Location within Province of Alicante Location within Valencian Community Location within Spain
- Coordinates: 38°14′55″N 0°48′32″W
- Country: Spain
- Autonomous community: Valencian Community
- Province: Alicante
- Comarca: Baix Vinalopó
- Judicial district: Elche

Government
  - Alcalde (Mayor): José Manuel Penalva Casanova (Compromís)

Area
  - Total: 104.50 km^{2} (40.35 sq mi)
- Elevation: 130 m (430 ft)

Population (2025-01-01)
  - Total: 30,921
  - Density: 295.89/km^{2} (766.36/sq mi)
- Demonyms: • crevillentí, -ina (Val.) • crevillentino/a (Sp.)
- Official language(s): Valencian; Spanish
- Linguistic area: Valencian
- Time zone: UTC+1 (CET)
  - Summer (DST): UTC+2 (CEST)
- Postal code: 03330
- Website: Official website

Crevillent, (Note: Pronunciation of Crevillent: Valencian: [kɾeviˈʎent]) in Valencian (known in Spanish as Crevillente), (Note: Pronunciation of Crevillente (unofficial): Spanish: [kɾeβiˈʎente]) is a town and municipality located in the Alicante province, part of the Valencian Community, Spain. It is situated in the comarca of Baix Vinalopó, and lies at the foot of the hill range known locally as Serra de Crevillent. As of 2009, it has a total population of 28,609 inhabitants.

The terrain is dry, and its main vegetation is composed by carob trees, almond trees, olive trees and esparto. Crevillent is a major producer and exporter of carpets and pomegranates.

The town was probably settled by Romans. In 1263, during the period known as Reconquista, James I of Aragon captured the city from the Moors and became a part of the Kingdom of Valencia.

The most important tourist places of the city is a museum with works of Mariano Benlliure, a Valencian sculptor. Also remarkable is its Moors and Christians festival.

Many of the agricultural areas, particularly El Realengo, contain ruins of prisons, ovens and torture houses used during Francisco Franco's reign and the Spanish Civil War in the early 1900s.

== People ==
- Francisco Mas Magro, Doctor and candidate for the Nobel Prize in 1953
- Cristian López, footballer born 1989
- Juanfran, former professional footballer
- Marcos Galvañ, songwriter

== See also ==
- Crevillente Deportivo
