= Novelda =

- Town and municipality
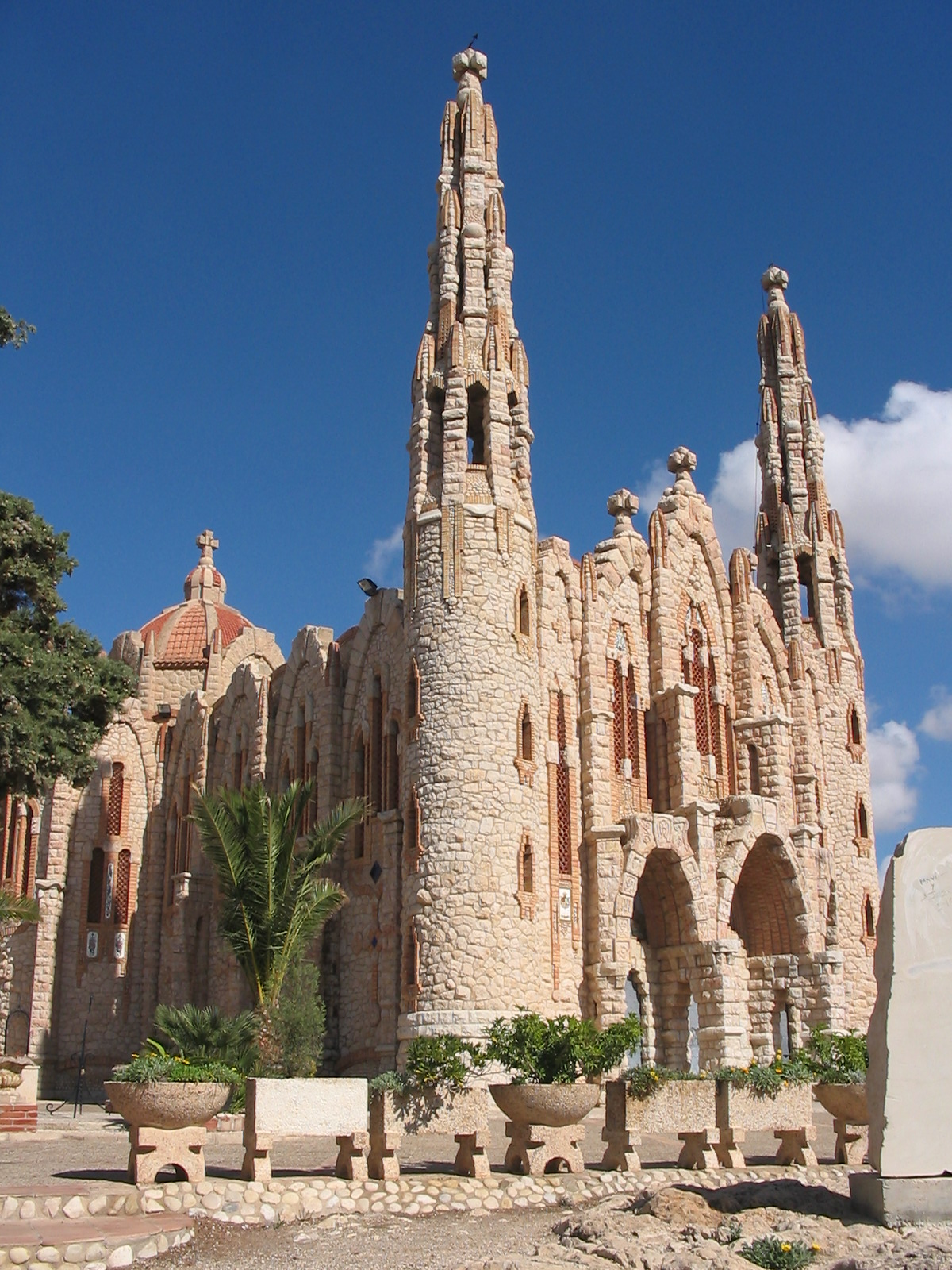
- Monastery of Santa Maria Magdalena.

- Flag Coat of arms

- Location in Spain Novelda (Valencian Community) Novelda (Spain)
- Coordinates: 38.385°N 0.768°W
- Country: Spain
- Autonomous community: Valencian Community
- Province: Alicante
- Comarca: Vinalopó Mitjà

Government
  - Alcalde (Mayor): Francisco Martínez Alted (PSOE-PSPV)

Area
  - Total: 75.7 km^{2} (29.2 sq mi)
- Elevation: 241 m (791 ft)

Population (2025-01-01)
  - Total: 26,606
  - Density: 351/km^{2} (910/sq mi)
- Demonyms: Noveldan • novelder, -a (Val.) • noveldense (Sp.)
- Official language(s): Valencian; Spanish
- Linguistic area: Valencian
- Postcode: 03660
- Website: Official website

Novelda (Note: Pronunciation: Valencian: [noˈvɛlda], locally [nuˈvɛldɛ] Spanish: [noˈβelda]) is a town located in the province of Alicante, Valencian Community, Spain. As of 2009, it has a total population of 27,135 inhabitants.

Novelda has important quarries and mines of marble, limestone, silica, clay and gypsum. It is a major centre of the marble industry.

It was probably settled by Greeks, although it was controlled by Carthaginians, Romans and Al Andalus. Some centuries later it was conquered by a son of Ferdinand III of Castile.

Places of tourist interest in Novelda include the monastery of Santa Maria Magdalena (dated from the 19th century), which has a church designed by a disciple of Antoni Gaudí, the Moorish castle of the Mola, with its unique triangular tower, and the Museum of Modernism. This is a well preserved Art Nouveau house with original artifacts from the 1920s. The house itself is a work of art. The House-Museum is located in a modernist building designed by Pedro Cerdan Martinez (1863-1947) and is now a centre for modernist research and promotion. There are also several natural and salty lakes to visit in the surroundings.

Gallery: Santa Maria Magdalena

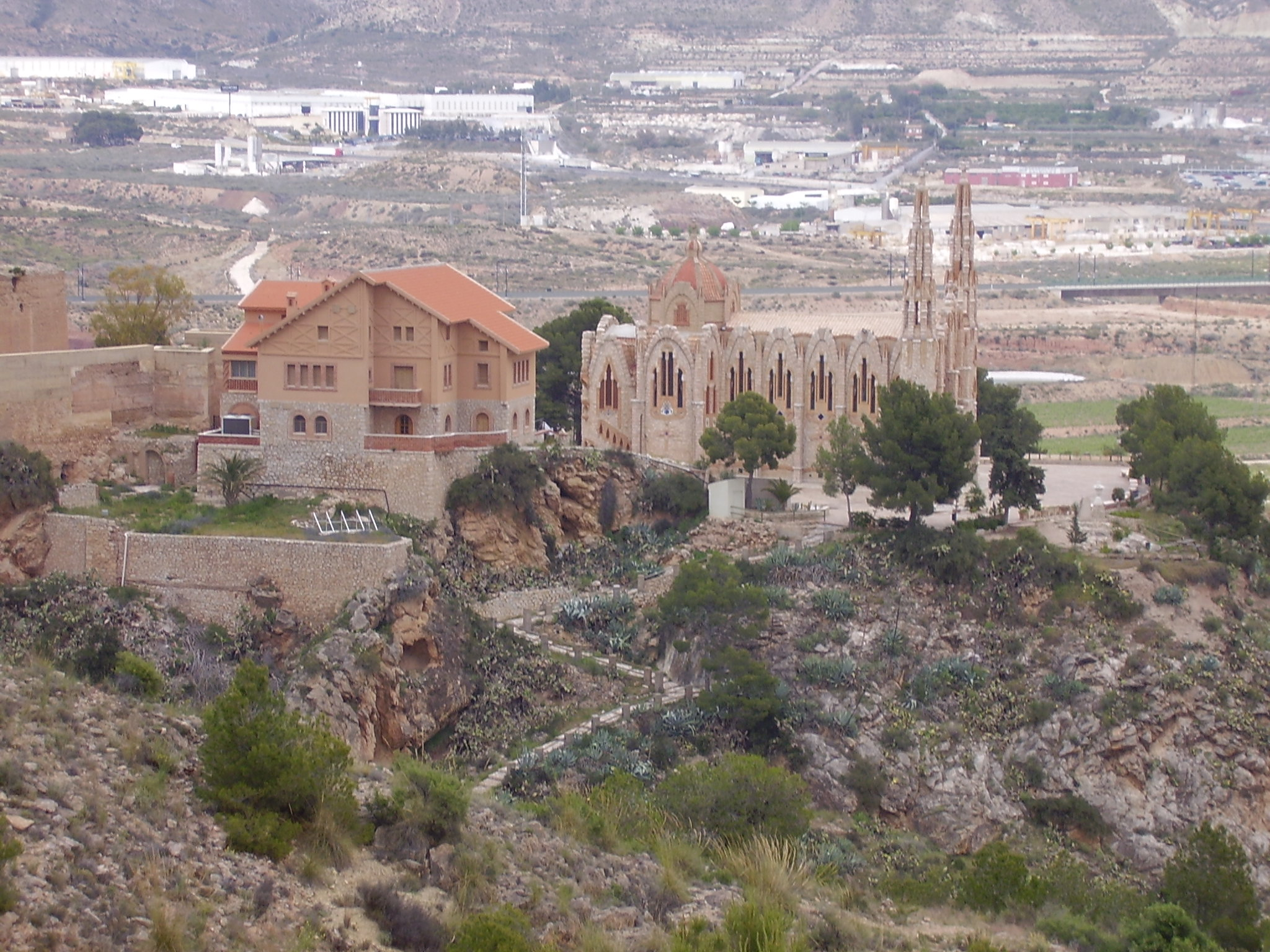

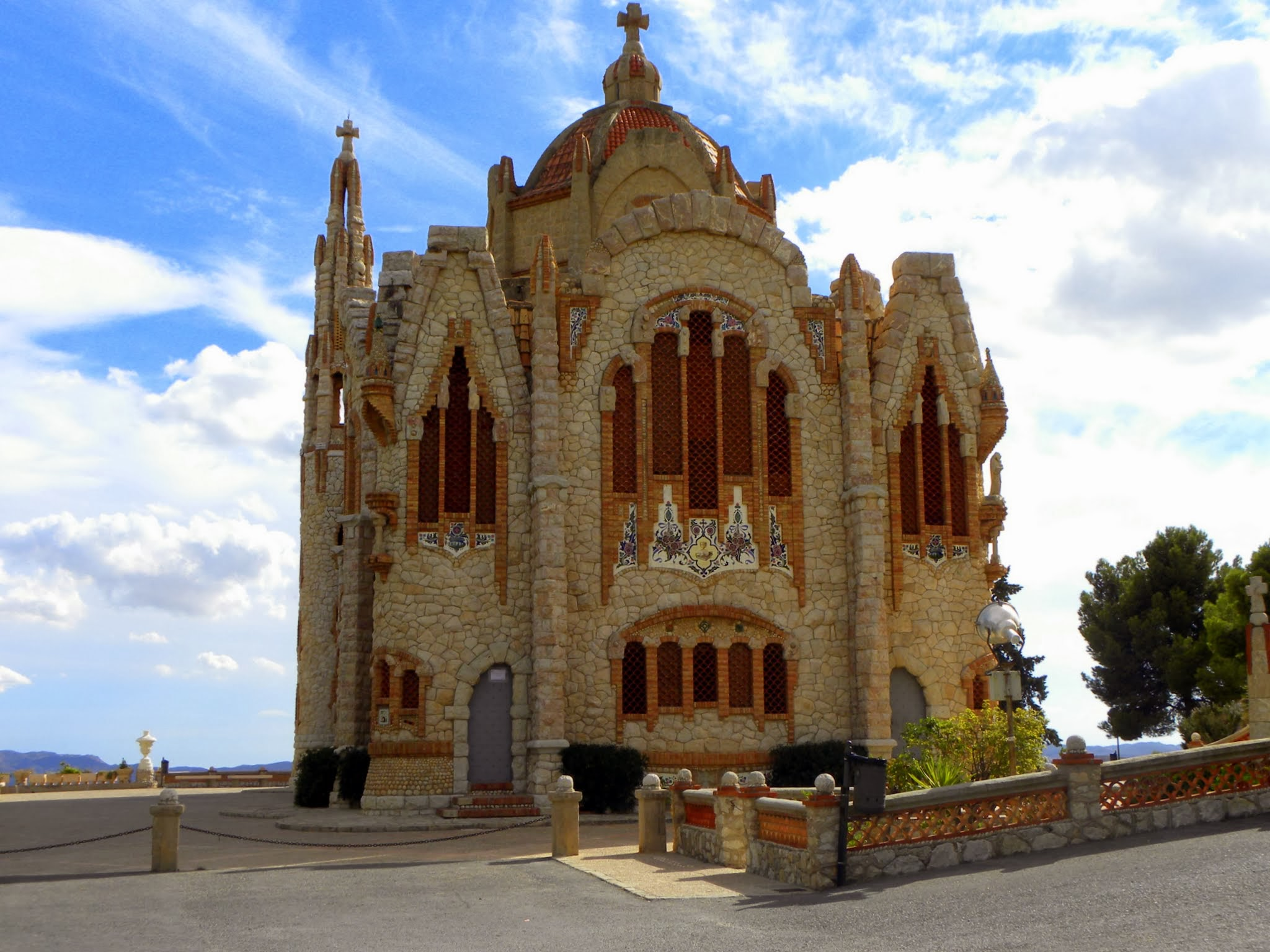

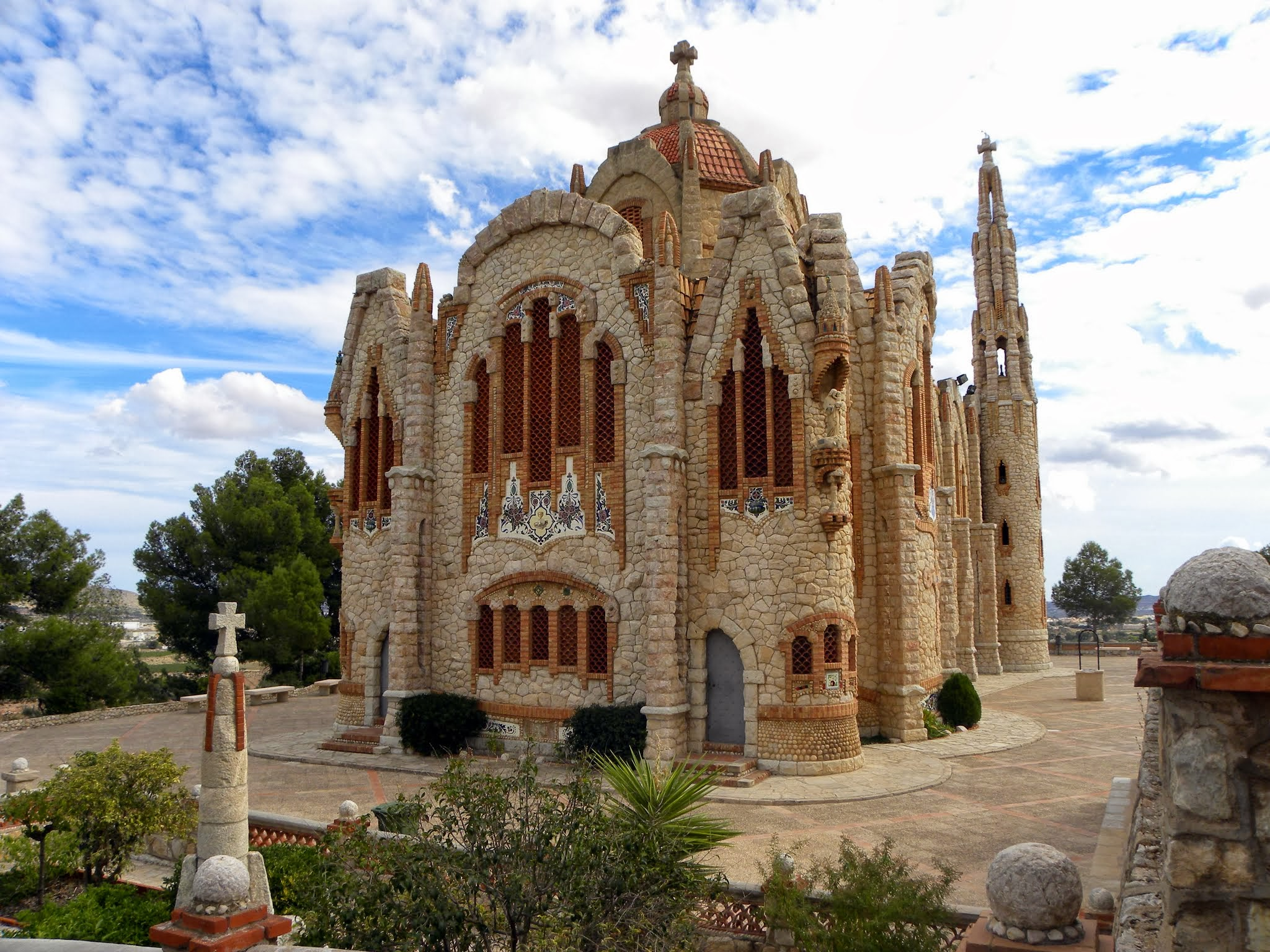

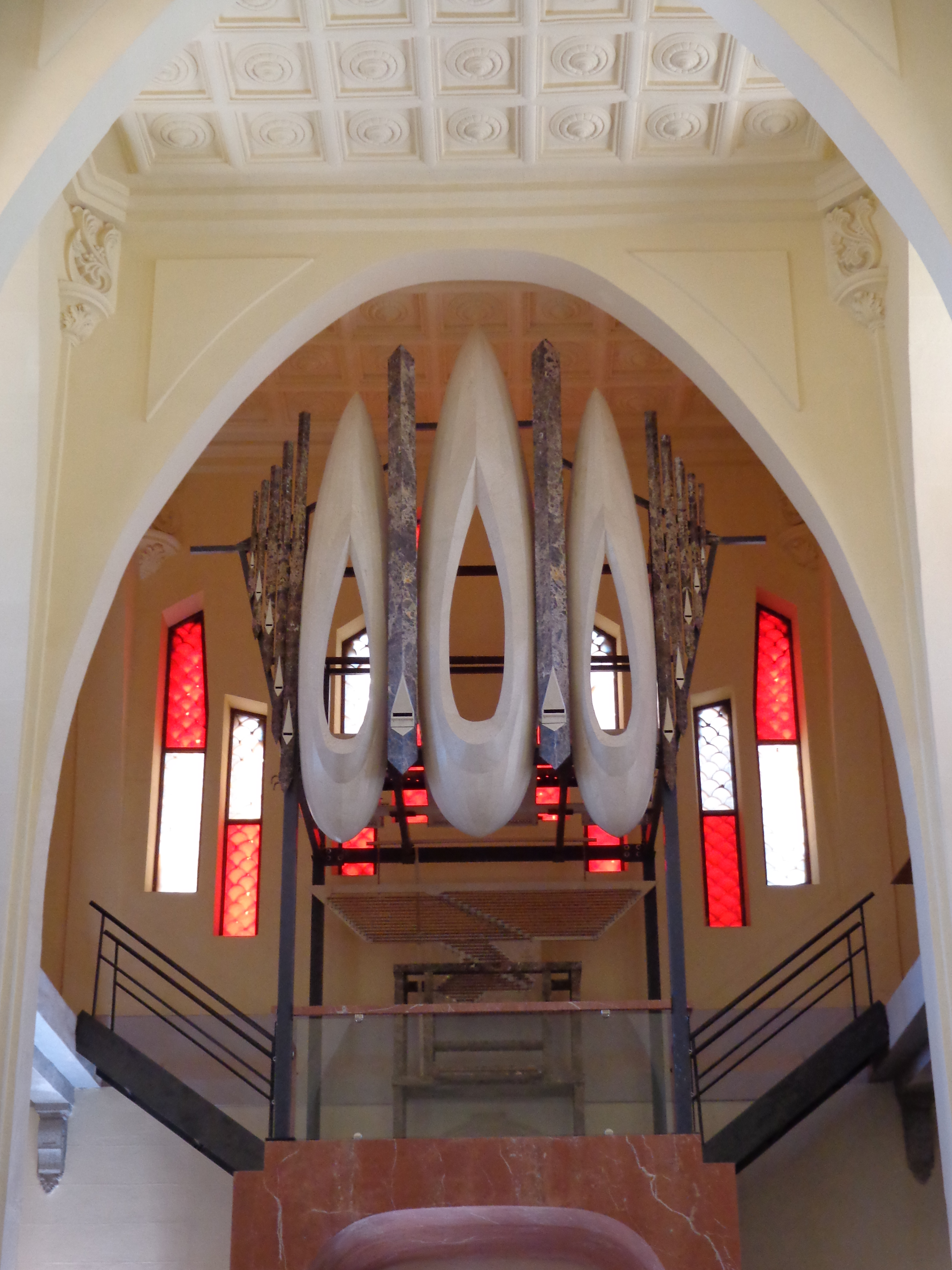

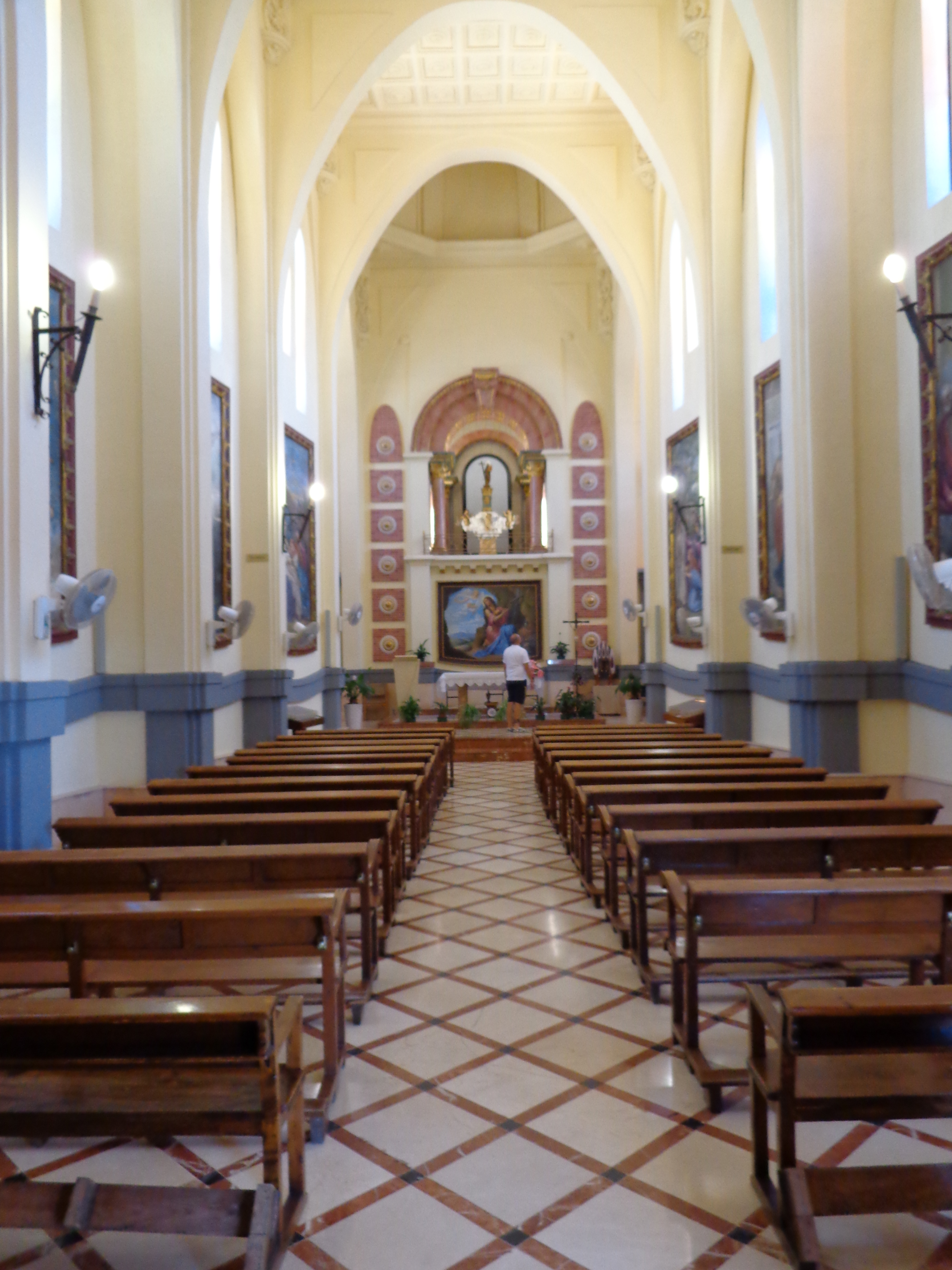

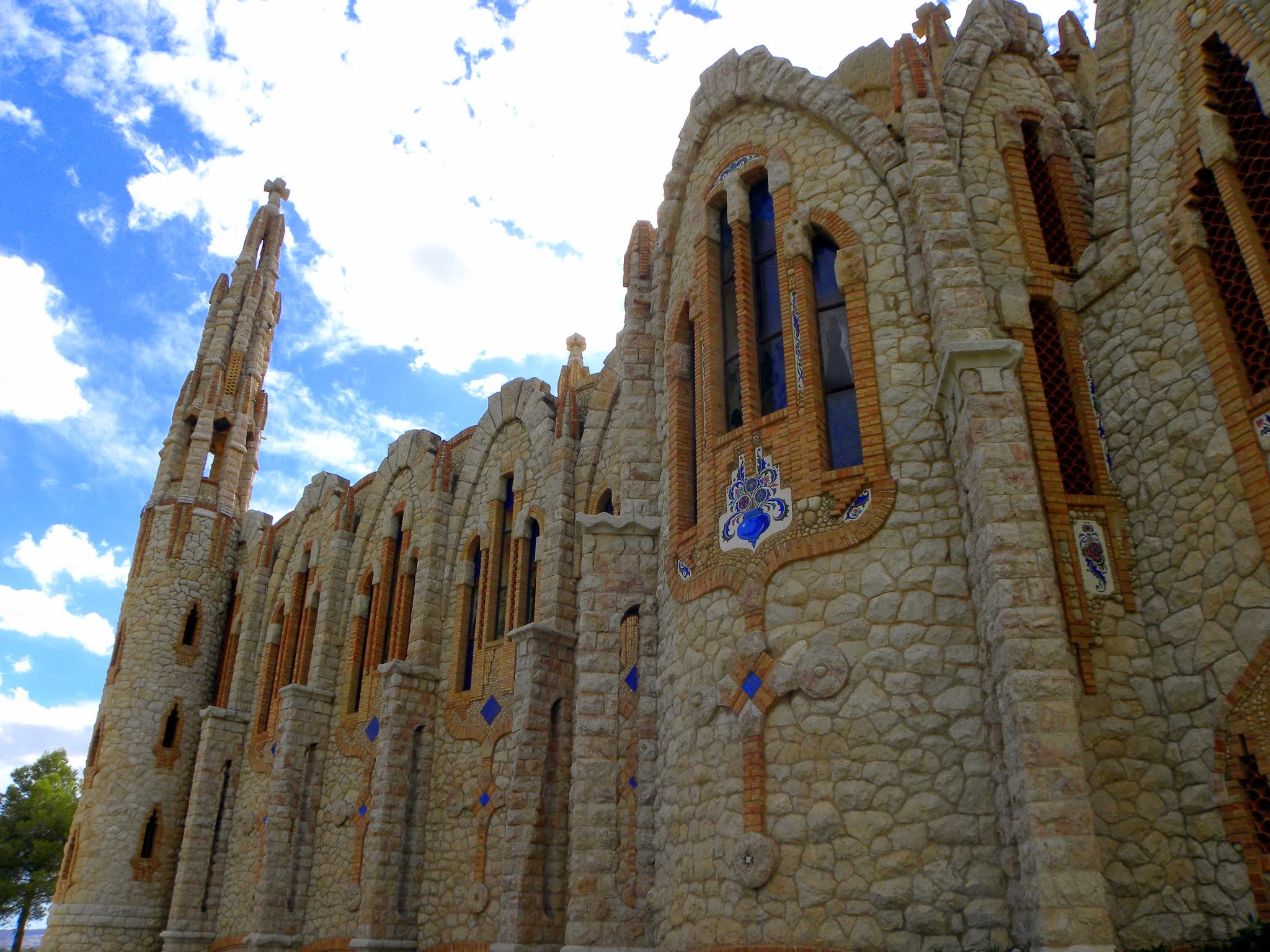

== Notable people ==
- Mario Gaspar, footballer
- Fernando Béjar (born 6 October 1980), former footballer

== See also ==
- Route of the Castles of Vinalopó
