= Vilena =

Vilena may refer to:

- Feminine form of Vilen (given name)
- Vileña, municipality in the province of Burgos, Castile and León, Spain
- Vilena, fictional island and dictatorship in the 2010 film The Expendables

== See also ==
- Villena
- Vilhena (disambiguation)
