= Moros y Cristianos =

Traditional Spanish festival

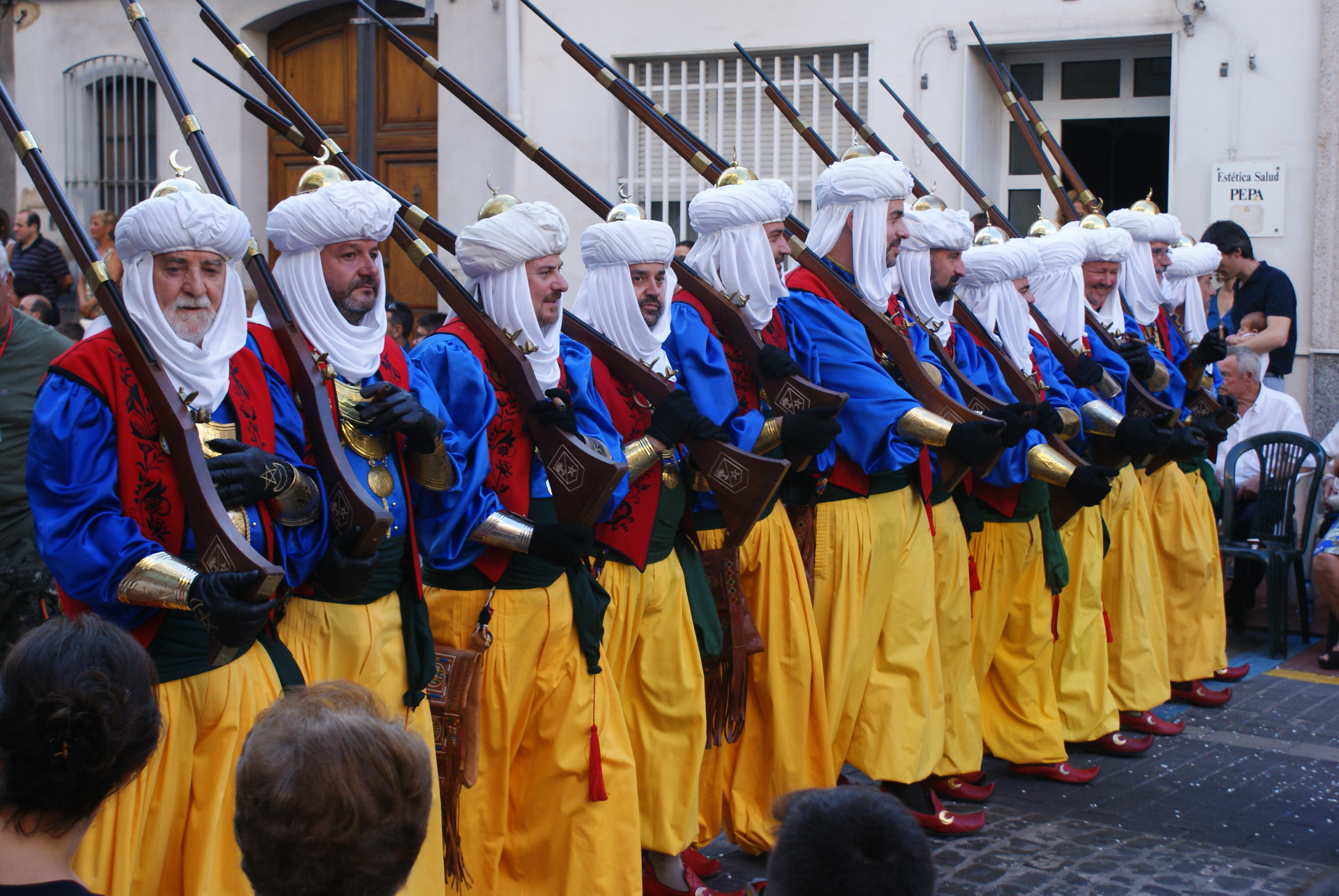
Moros y Cristianos festival in Oliva

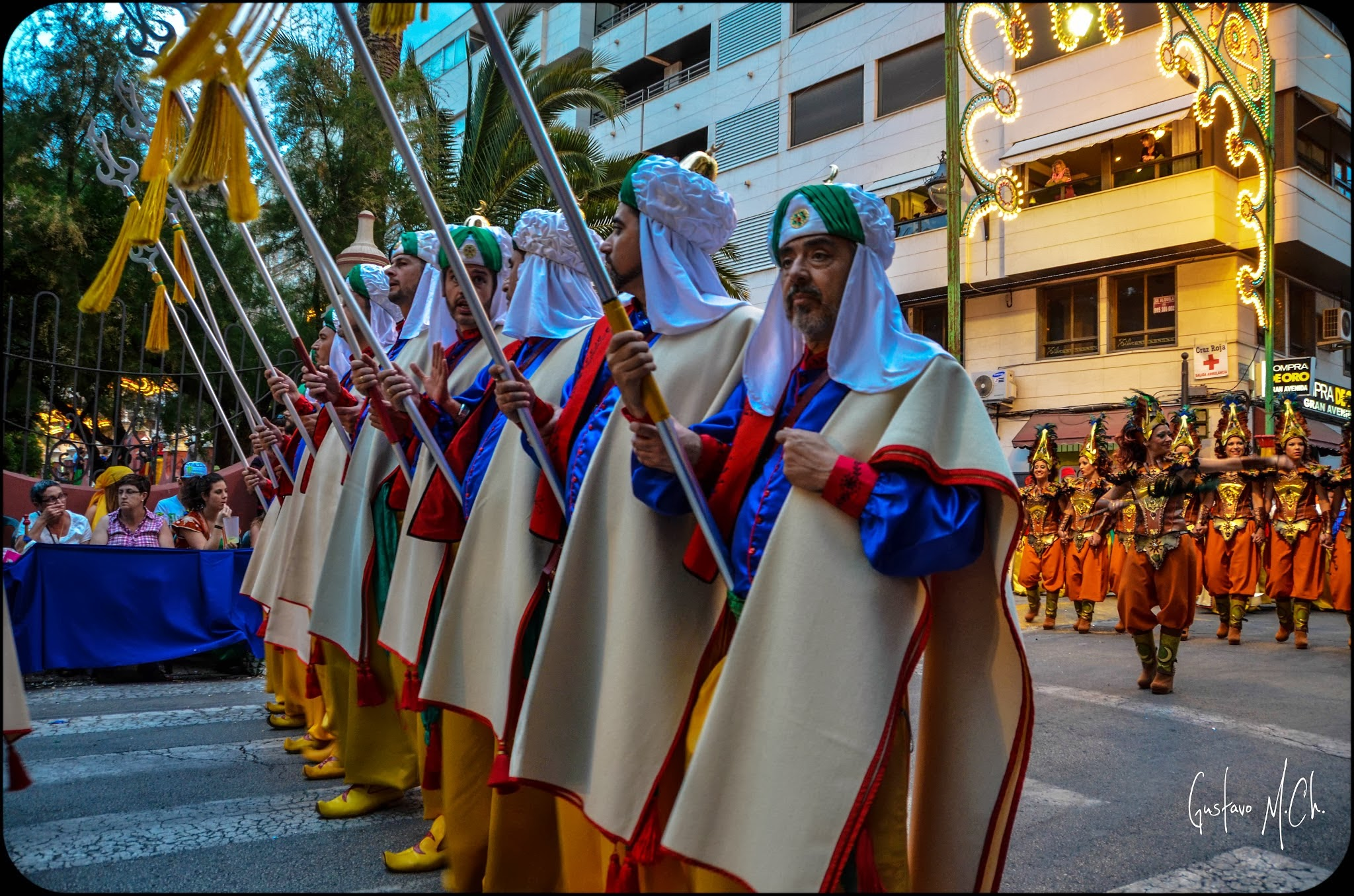
Moros y Cristianos festival in Elda

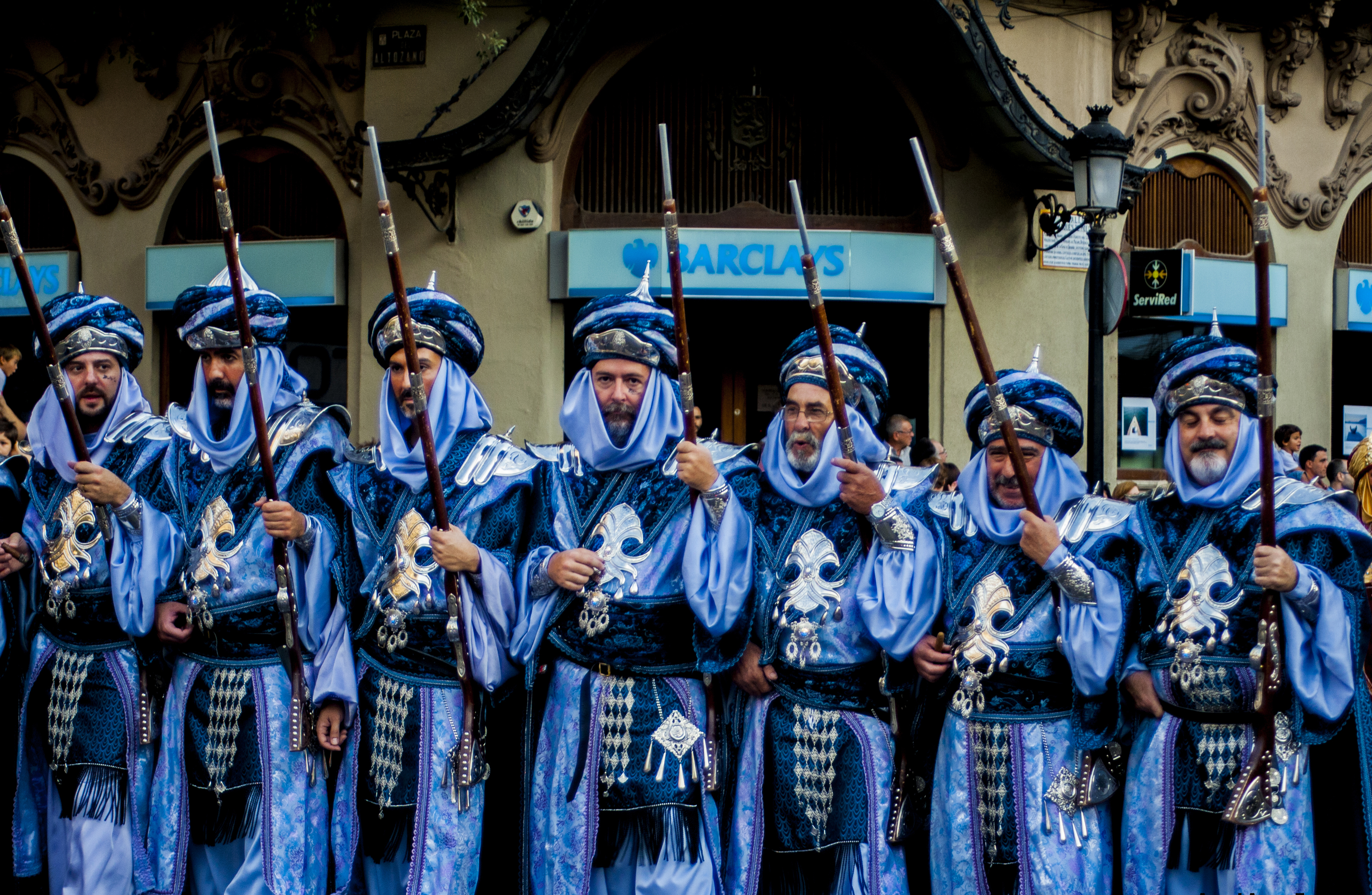
Parade of a Moor filà of the Moros y Cristianos festival in Albacete

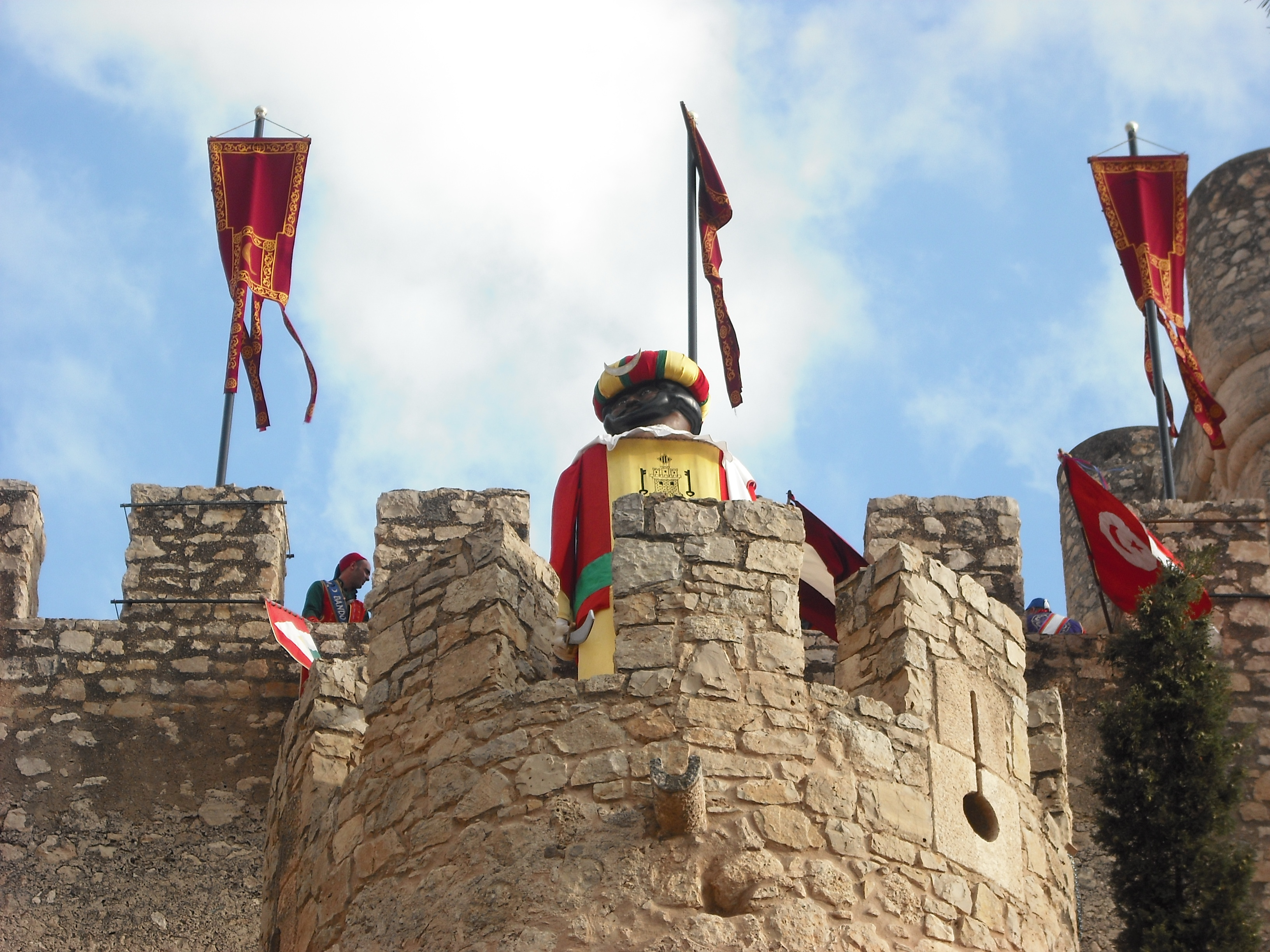
The Moor Embassy in Atalaya Castle, Villena

Moros y Cristianos (Spanish: [ˈmoɾos i kɾisˈtjanos]) or Moros i Cristians (Valencian: [ˈmɔɾoz i kɾistiˈans]), literally in English Moors and Christians, is a set of festival activities which are celebrated in many towns and cities of Spain, mainly in the southern Valencian Community. According to popular tradition the festivals commemorate the battles, combats and fights between Moors (i.e. Muslims) and Christians during the period known as Reconquista (from the 8th century through the 15th century). There are also festivals of Moros y Cristianos in Spanish America.

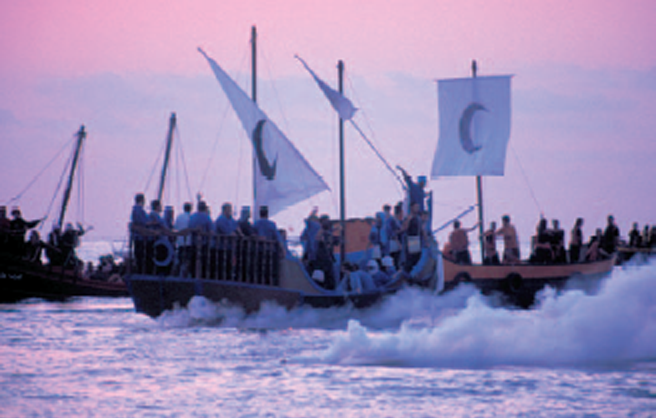
'Parading' Moorish ships along the beach of Villajoyosa, 2008

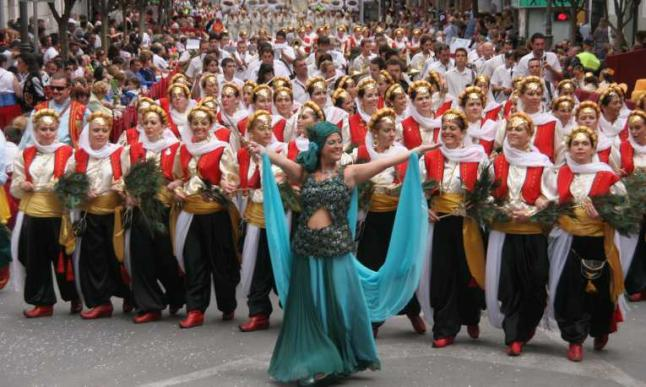
The parades in Villena brings together the largest number of participants and music bands.

The festivals represent the capture of the city by the Muslims and the subsequent Christian reconquering fight. The people who take part in the festival are usually enlisted in local associations called filaes (singular filà) or comparsas (companies that represent the Christian or Moor legions). Each side consists of various companies that carry out activities throughout the year, organizing spectacular parades during the days of the festival and spending a lot of gunpowder with firing salutes from the arquebus in dramatized battles. The festivals last for several days, and feature festive parades with bombastic costumes loosely inspired by Medieval fashion. Christians wear fur, metallic helmets, and armor, fire loud arquebuses, and ride horses. In contrast, Moors wear ancient Arab costumes, carry scimitars, and ride real camels or elephants. The festival develops among shots of gunpowder, medieval music, and fireworks, and ends with the Christians winning a simulated battle around a castle.

Due to Spanish Empire expansion, the performing art has been adapted in other places in Europe, America, and Asia, as in the Philippines since the 17th century and is a popular street play throughout the country. Unlike the Spanish version, the Philippine version is dominated by indigenous Philippine cultures which are used in language, costumes, musics, and dances of the play. The main story of the art, however, has been faithfully retained. Similar celebrations in Zacatecas, México, are called Morisma.

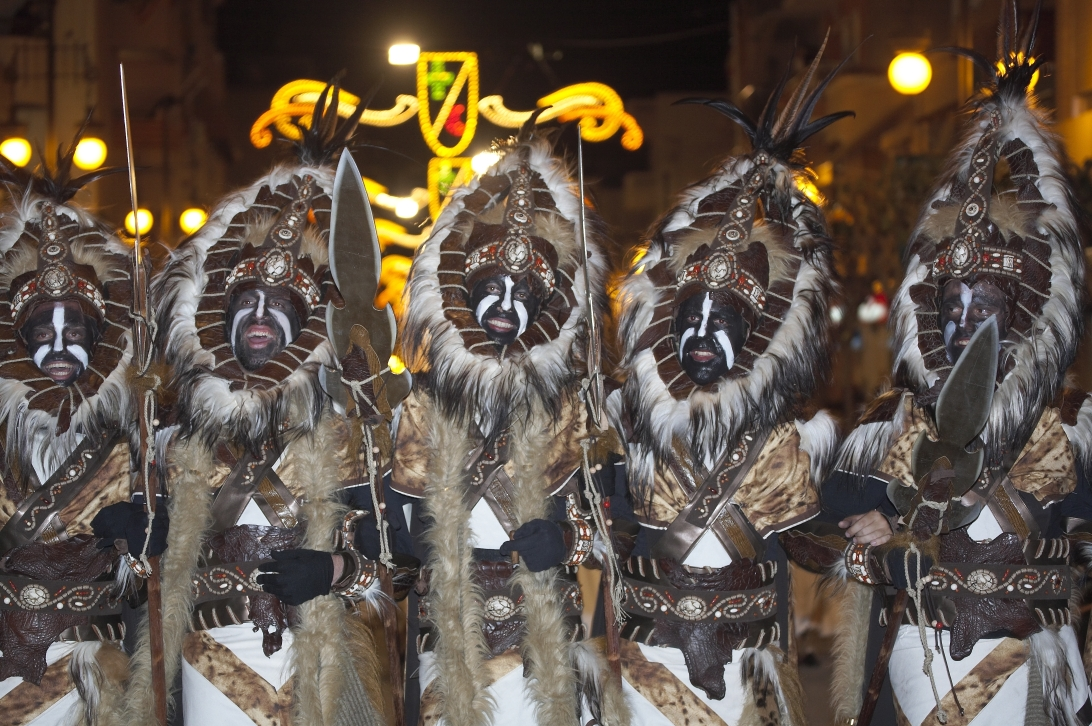
Entrance of the Moors, 2006 - El Campello

== Origin ==
Theatrical festivities with this setting are already documented even before the end of the Reconquista itself, in 1426 in Murcia and in 1463 in Jaén. The modern "comparsas" or companies of Moors and Christians have their origin in the old Soldadesca, the local militia that carried out military acts of display or exhibition of the troops if required to pay tribute to some authority. Traditionally they carried out these troop parades during the so-called "royal festivities" for the visit of the king, a royal anniversary, commemoration of a victory or birth of a prince. In certain towns, these acts of the militia were also carried out to honor the local patron figure on his holiday, which is why it survived as annual celebrations.

The historical element is added by taking advantage of these festivities for the representation and exhibition of Moors and Christians comedies, normally with a moralistic or religious didactic character. It is from the beginning of the 19th century when the first texts of Las Embajadas (the Embassies) appear, which require the need for two sides facing each other for the conquest of a castle.

== Venues ==
The most well-known Moors and Christians festival are the Moors and Christians of Alcoy that takes place in Alcoi (Valencian Community) from 22 to 24 April, around the Feast Day of Saint George (Valencian: Sant Jordi; Spanish: San Jorge), the patron saint of the Crown of Aragon (Catalonia, Aragon and formerly also of the Valencian Community). According to legend, after James I of Aragon reconquered the city of Alcoi, the Moors, in turn, tried to recover it. As fighting was about to resume, Saint George miraculously appeared, and the frightened Moors scattered in defeat. Other traditions ascribe a miraculous saintly appearance to Saint James (Santiago), the patron saint of Spain, particularly at the Battle of Las Navas de Tolosa (in what today is the municipality of La Carolina, Province of Jaén, Andalusia), sometimes guiding the Christians to surprise the Moors; else rallying Christian forces during the battle. The feast day of St. James is 25 July, so some of the Moors' and Christians' festivals occur at the end of July. La Vila Joiosa / Villajoyosa celebrates it in the last week of July, with a reenactment of the Berber pirate attack of 1538 (desembarc), according to tradition repelled when St. Martha (feast day 29 July) sent a flash flood. Especially in northern and western Spain (Catalonia, Valencian Community, and other places), parades associated with Corpus Christi celebrations may feature gigantic costumed Moors and Christians, also commemorating the Reconquest.

Other noteworthy Moors and Christians festivals are celebrated in the towns of Bocairent (a Medieval town, 1–5 February), Banyeres de Mariola (22-25 April), Villena with approximately 12,000 participants (most crowded festival), Almoradí (early August), Biar, Cocentaina, Crevillent, El Campello, Elche, Elda, Muro d'Alcoi, Oliva, Ontinyent (late August), Orihuela, Petrel, Sax, Novelda, Monforte del Cid, and some districts of the city of Alicante.

Andalusia also has very interesting Moors and Christians performances, especially in the former Moorish kingdom of Granada. Performances are mostly organized in rural towns and villages, such as Válor, Granada, a small town in the Eastern Alpujarras.

Spaniards took this tradition overseas. In the Philippines, fiestas often include a moro-moro play. The show begins with a parade of stars in colorful costumes: Christians wear blue costumes, while Moors wear fully ornamented red costumes. Mexico, Guatemala, Peru and Colombia also have festivals featuring Moors and Christians reenactments (the Mexican term is morisma).

== Music ==
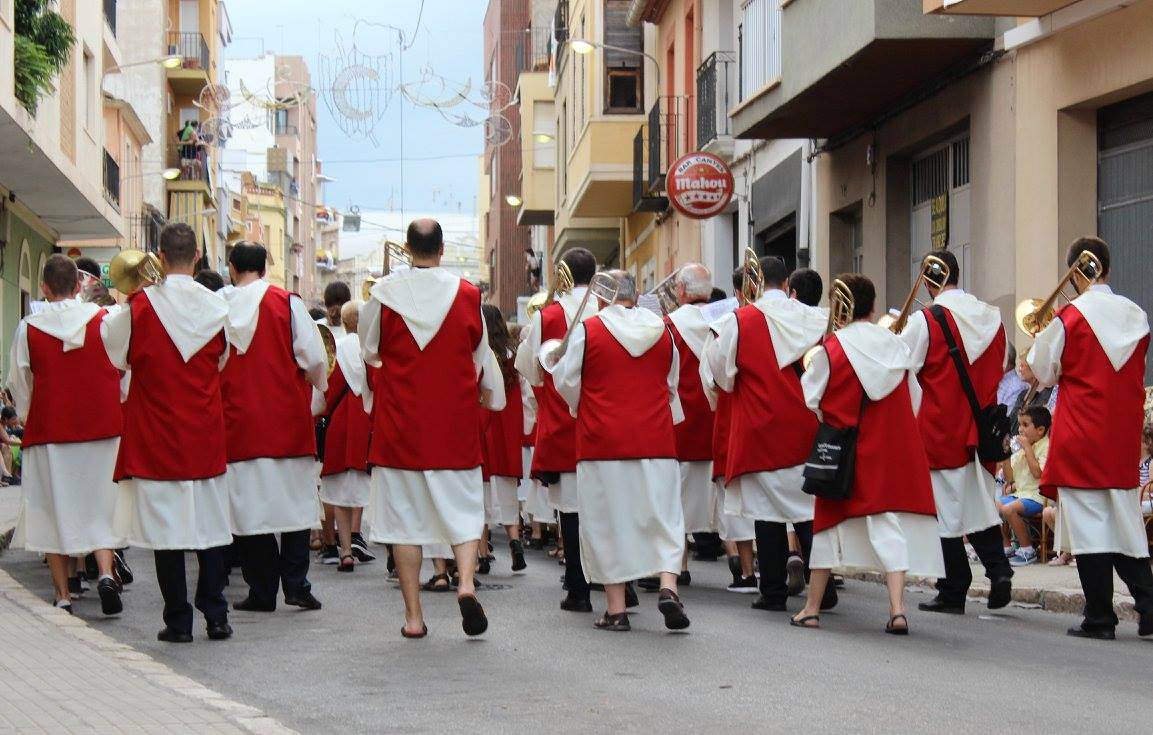
Moors and Christians marching band

A significant amount of incidental music has been composed and still is composed annually for these parades. It is known as música festera and comes from military band marches. There are currently three main genres: the classic and popular pasodobles, the melodious marchas moras (Moorish in style), and the forceful marchas cristianas. In Spain a marching band or concert band plays the repertoire for these parades, in the two latter types of marches the band's music is reinforced by timpani, concert bass drums and a gong.

== Philippine Moro y Cristianos ==
In the Philippines, the performing art is officially called Moro y Cristianos Street Drama by the National Commission for Culture and the Arts, the cultural agency of the government. On July 5, 1637, Jesuit priest F. Hironimo Perez finished the first Moro y Cristianos play in the Philippines. The first drama was played in a church, and was presented to the governor-general for a victory play against Muslims in the south. Afterwards, the play became known in the common tongue as moro-moro, which is the common name of the street drama today. The street drama itself, however, did not draw from actual Christian-Muslim conflict in the Philippines. The main precursor of its popularity in the Philippines was the indigenous awit and corrido traditions in Philippine native cultures.

When performing, the representations for the Christians are in blue, while the representations for Muslims are in red or maroon. The street drama includes pasa dobles tune marches, rigodon in battles, courtships between a Moro prince and a Christian princess and vice versa, and a conclusion which usually depicts the Muslim converting into Christianity, the Muslim dying, or the appearance of the Virgin Mary or a saint as the intervention figure of the conflict. The komedya usually begins with a loa, followed by a parada. Usually, the main part of the story begins with a Muslim embahador delivering a challenge to an equally-boastful Christian. The street drama became popular in the rural areas due to the inputting of folk traditions in the play and the need of the people for leisure, especially after a hard day at labor. Overall, the Philippine moros y cristianos may last from one to several days, depending on the Philippine-written script being used. There are also numerous sub-genres of moros y cristianos where specific localities specialize in such as the arakyo which is conducted only in some towns in southern Nueva Ecija.

In 2011, the performing art was cited by the National Commission for Culture and the Arts as one of the intangible cultural heritage of the Philippines under the performing arts category that the government may nominate in the UNESCO Intangible Cultural Heritage Lists.

== See also ==
- Moors and Christians of Alcoy
- Moors and Christians of Villena
- Museu Alcoià de la Festa
