= Embrasure =

Opening in a battlement

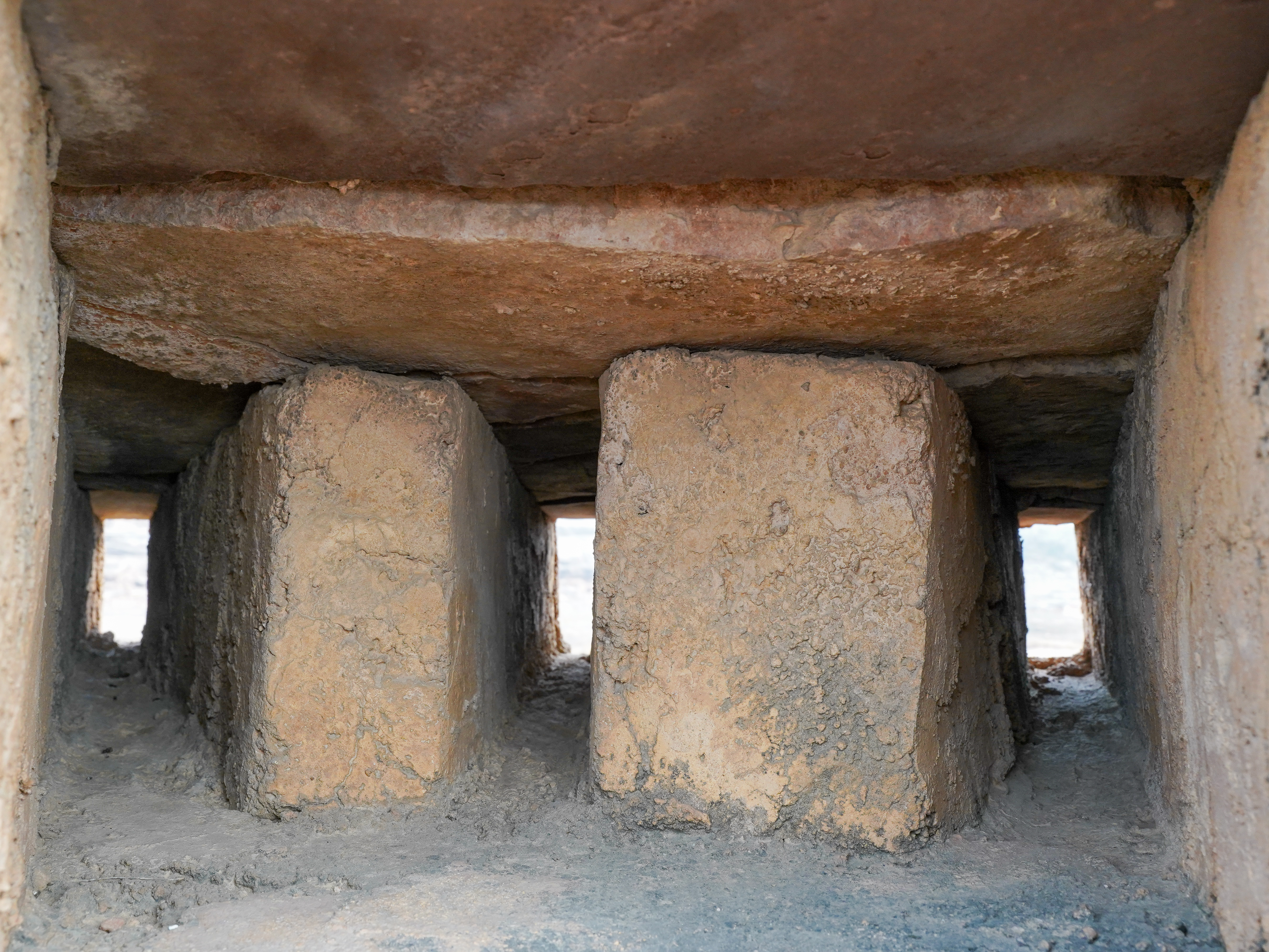
Embrasure with three angles of fire, Keoti Fort, India

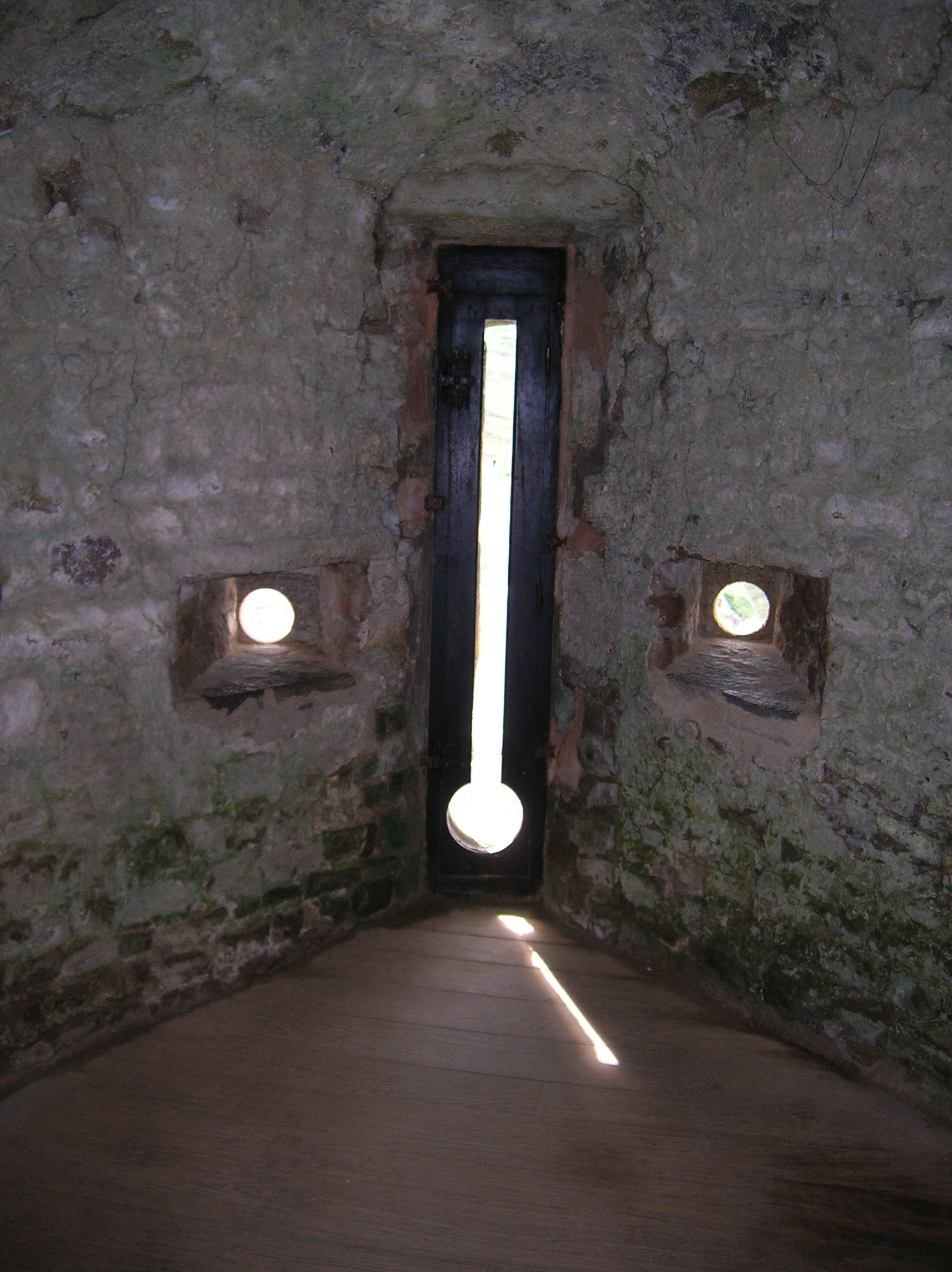
A loophole or inverted keyhole embrasure, allowing both arrow fire (through the arrowslit at the top) and small cannon fire through the circular openings, Fort-la-Latte, France

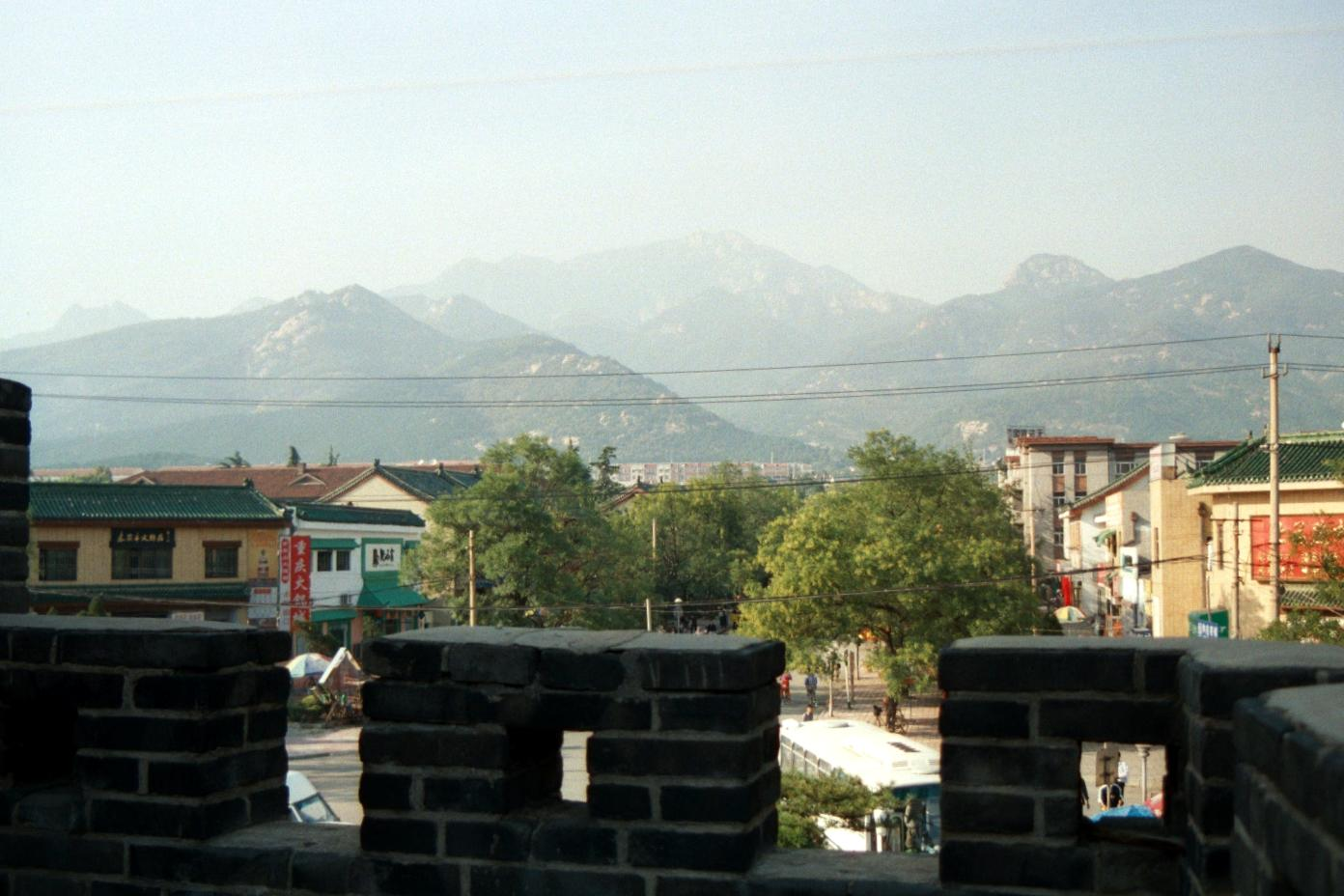
Embrasure of Chinese wall

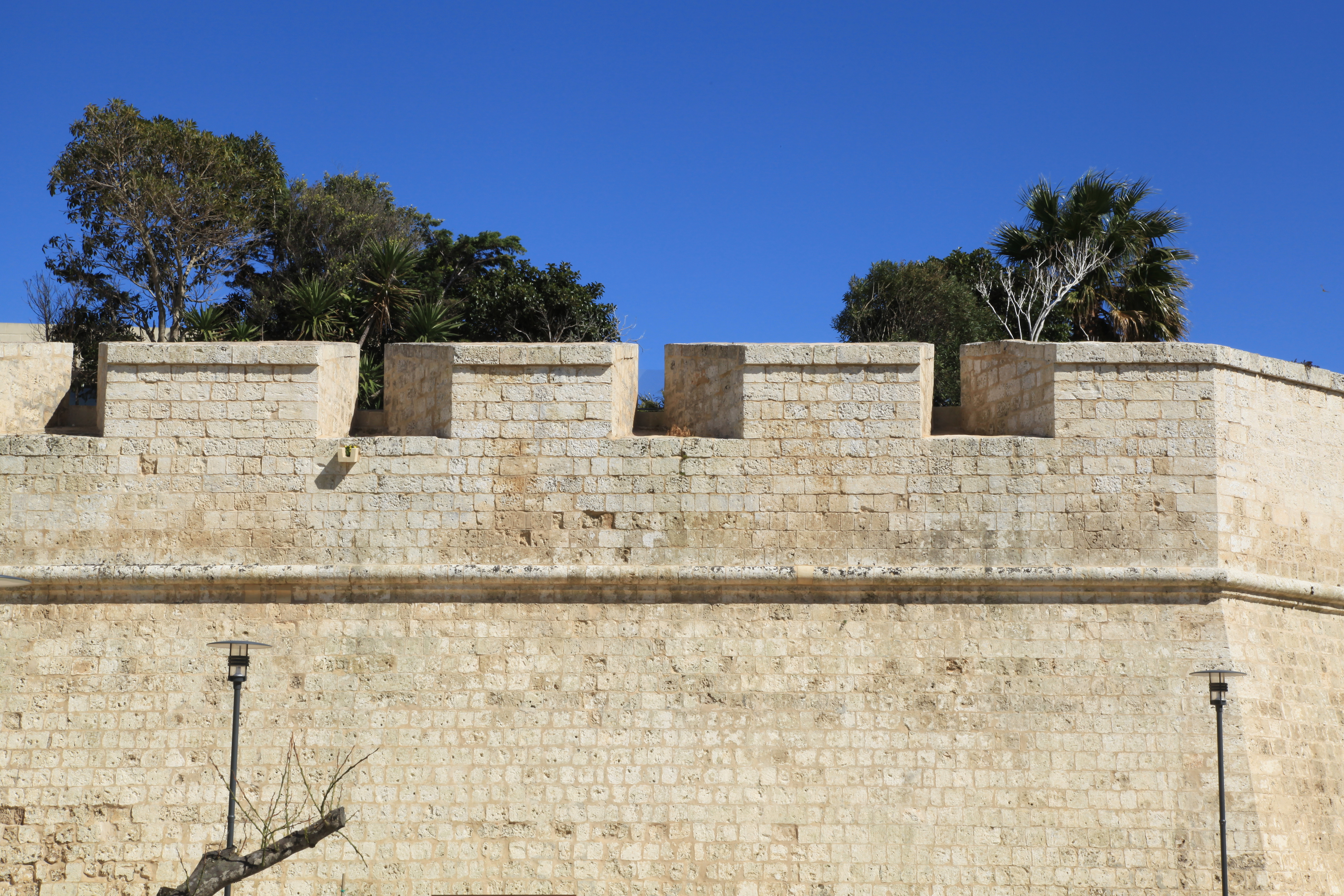
Embrasures at Mdina, Malta

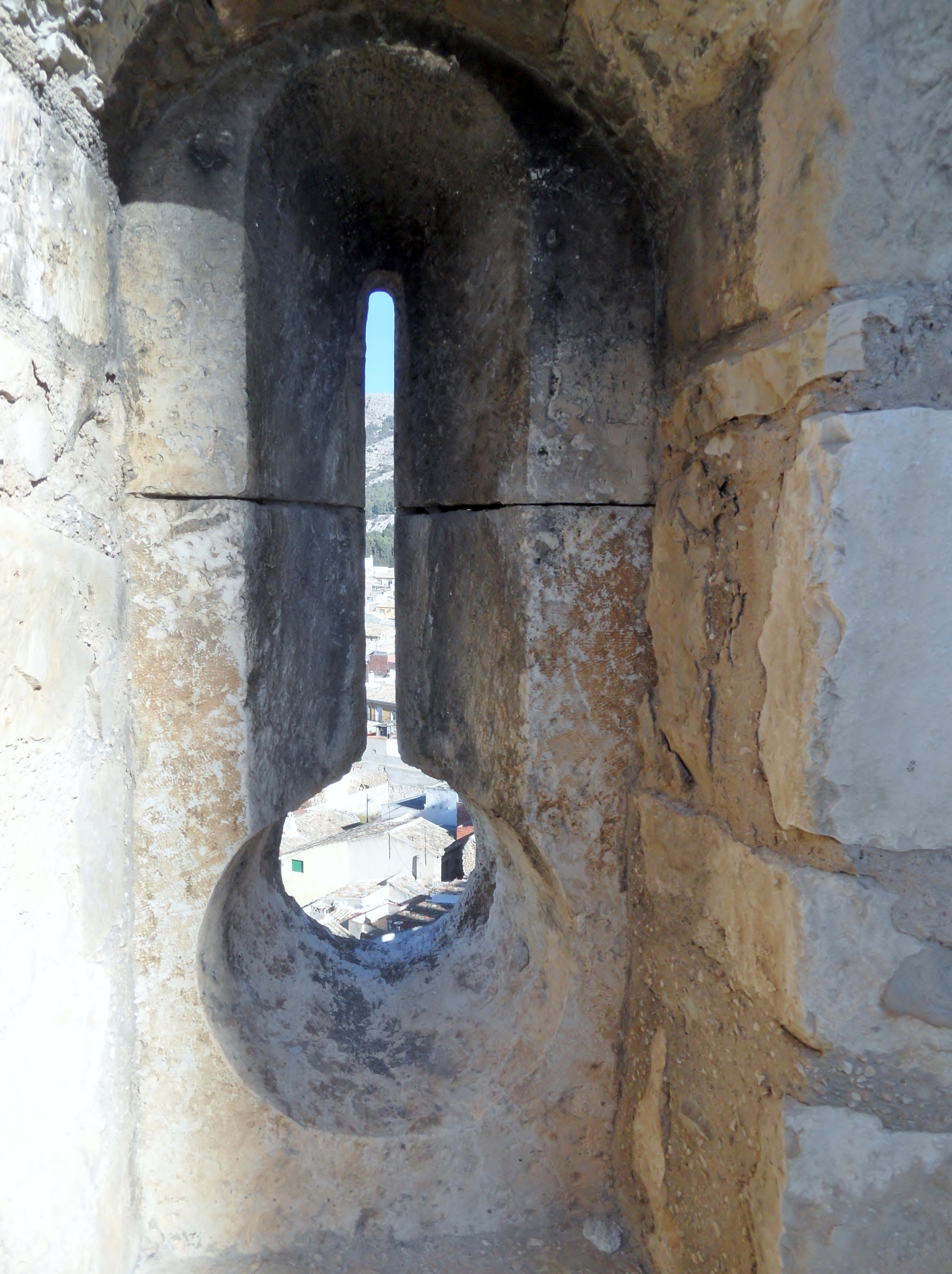
Embrasure at Atalaya Castle, Spain

Annotated sketch of an Italian battlement

An embrasure (or crenel or crenelle; sometimes called gunhole in the domain of gunpowder-era architecture) is the opening in a battlement between two raised solid portions (merlons). Alternatively, an embrasure can be a space hollowed out throughout the thickness of a wall by the establishment of a bay. This term designates the internal part of this space, relative to the closing device, door or window. In fortification this refers to the outward splay of a window or of an arrowslit on the inside.

In ancient and medieval military engineering, embrasures were constructed in towers and walls. A loophole, arrow loop or arrowslit passes through a solid wall, and thus forms an embrasure of shooting, allowing archer or gunner weapons to be fired out from the fortification while the firer remains under cover.

This type of opening was flared inward - that is: the opening was very narrow on the outside, but wide on the inside, so that archers had free space of movement and aiming, while exterior attackers had as much difficulty as possible to reach them. There are embrasures especially in fortified castles and bunkers. The generic term of loophole is gradually abandoned because of its imprecision, in favour of those more precise of archer, crossbowman, gunner archer. The splay of the wall on the inside provides room for defending soldiers and their equipment, allowing them to get as close to the wall-face and to the arrowslit itself as possible. Examples of deep embrasures with arrowslits are to be seen at Aigues-Mortes and Château de Coucy, both in France.

With the introduction of firearms, the term embrasure designated more specifically the opening made in a fortified structure to allow the firing of these weapons. In modern architecture, embrasures are incorporated during construction because they are intended to receive a door or a window. These are not openings made after construction.

== Etymology ==
The term embrasure (/ɪmˈbreɪʒər/) comes from French (French pronunciation: [ɑ̃bʁazyʁ]), and is described as a hole in a parapet through which cannons are laid to fire into the moat or field.

== History ==
The invention of the arrowslit is attributed to Archimedes during the siege of Syracuse in 214–212 BCE:

From Polybius's (c. 200–118 BC) The Histories (Book VIII, Ch. 5): "Archimedes had had the walls pierced with large numbers of loopholes at the height of a man, which were about a palm's breadth wide at the outer surface of the walls. Behind each of these and inside the walls were stationed archers with rows of so-called "scorpions", a small catapult which discharged iron darts, and by shooting through these embrasures they put many of the marines out of action."

However, the invention was later forgotten until reintroduced in the 12th century.

By the 19th century, a distinction was made between embrasures being used for cannons, and loopholes being used for musketry. In both cases, the opening was normally made wider on the inside of the wall than the outside. The outside was made as narrow as possible (slightly wider than the muzzle of the weapon intended to use it) so as to afford the most difficult possible shot to attackers firing back, but the inside had to be wider in order to enable the weapon to be swivelled around so as to aim over a reasonably large arc.

== Variations ==
A distinction was made between horizontal and vertical embrasures or loopholes, depending on the orientation of the opening formed in the outside wall. A vertical loophole—which was much more common—allows the weapon to be easily raised and lowered in elevation to cover a variety of ranges easily. To sweep from side to side, however, the weapon (and its firer or crew) must bodily move from side to side to pivot around the muzzle, which is effectively fixed by the width of the opening. A horizontal loophole, on the other hand, facilitates quick sweeping across the arc in front, but makes large adjustments in elevation very difficult. These were usually used in circumstances where the range was very restricted or where rapid cover of a wide field was preferred.

Another variation of the embrasure featured both horizontal and vertical slits arranged in the form of a cross, and was called a crosslet loop or an arbalestina since it was principally intended for arbalestiers (crossbowmen). In the 16th and 17th centuries, after the crossbow had become obsolete as a military weapon, crosslet loopholes were still sometimes created as a decorative architectural feature with Christian symbolism.

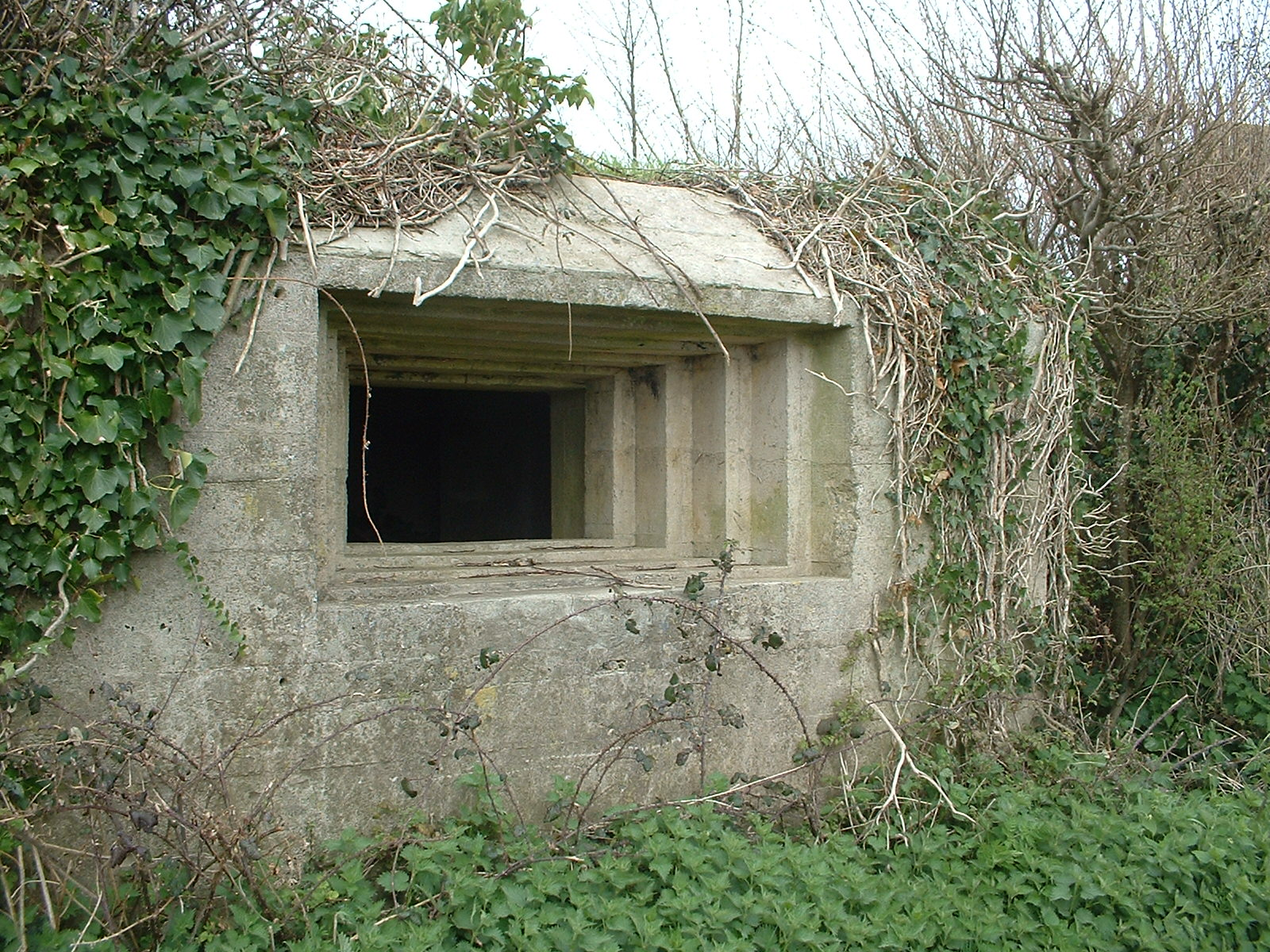
Pillbox stepped embrasure, Taunton Stop Line, England

A stepped embrasure was often utilised on pillbox bunkers of the 20th century. This allowed for a relatively wide field of fire compared to a traditional embrasure while also minimising the shot trap result created by the sloped opening. A series of perpendicular "steps" that tapered to the gun port ensured that any incoming fire that struck the inward-facing surface of a step would be stopped or deflected laterally by the outward-facing surface of the step and not funnelled inward toward the gunner. In the 19th century, each step was known as a 'redent', based on Old French and Latin for 'double notching' or 'like the teeth of a saw'.

On warships of the late 1860s and onwards to the First World War, the sides of a ship's hull might be recessed in locations near to a gun mounted in the hull. These recesses were also termed embrasures and were intended to allow a wider arc of fire than a standard broadside arrangement would otherwise permit. Central-battery ironclads like HMS Hercules featured such embrasures for fore and aft fire from the amidships battery's end guns. Later ironclads like HMS Alexandra featured embrasures which were 'open to the sky' in that they had no overhanging structure above the recessed area. This 'open-topped' embrasure became the standard arrangement for many cruisers and battleships of the pre-WW1 period. Once hull-mounted broadside weapons disappeared from the world's navies, so did the term.

== See also ==
- Firing port

== Sources ==
- Craig, John (1849). A New Universal Etymological, Technological and Pronouncing Dictionary of the English Language: Embracing All Terms Used in Art, Science, and Literature. Vol. 1st Vol. Henry George Collins.
- The CRAHAM (1982). Château Gaillard: études de castellologie médiévale. IX-X, Actes des colloques internationaux tenus à Basel, 1978 et à Durham, 1980 [Château Gaillard: studies of medieval castellology, IX-X: proceedings of international conferences held in Basel (1978) and Durham (1980)]. Caen: Centre de recherches archéologiques médiévales (CRAHAM). ISBN 2-902685-01-7.
- Shuckburgh, Evelyn Shirley (1889). The Histories of Polybius. Macmillan and Company.
