= Vilhena (disambiguation) =

Vilhena is a municipality in Rondônia, Brazil.

Vilhena may also refer to:

- Vilhena Esporte Clube, a football club in Vilhena, Brazil
- Vilhena Airport, an airport in Vilhena, Brazil
- Macasinia vilhena, a moth found in Rondônia, Brazil

== Places ==
- Floriana, a town in Malta also known as Borgo Vilhena
- Villena, a city in Valencia, Spain
- Palazzo Vilhena, a palace in Mdina, Malta

== People ==
- House of Manuel de Villena, Spanish noble family
  - Sancho Manoel de Vilhena, a Portuguese aristocrat and military leader
  - António Manoel de Vilhena, a Portuguese aristocrat and Grand Master
- Tonny Vilhena, a Dutch footballer
