= Macasinia mirabilana =

Scientific classification
- Kingdom: Animalia
- Phylum: Arthropoda
- Clade: Pancrustacea
- Class: Insecta
- Order: Lepidoptera
- Family: Tortricidae
- Genus: Macasinia
- Species: M. mirabilana

Binomial name
- Macasinia mirabilana Razowski & Becker, 2002

Species of moth

Macasinia mirabilana is a species of moth of the family Tortricidae. It is found in Minas Gerais, Brazil.

The wingspan is 16–17 mm.
