= Macasinia chorisma =

Scientific classification
- Kingdom: Animalia
- Phylum: Arthropoda
- Clade: Pancrustacea
- Class: Insecta
- Order: Lepidoptera
- Family: Tortricidae
- Genus: Macasinia
- Species: M. chorisma

Binomial name
- Macasinia chorisma (Razowski & J.W. Brown, 2004)

Synonyms
- Mexiculia chorisma Razowski & Brown, 2004

Species of moth

Macasinia chorisma is a species of moth of the family Tortricidae. It is found in Puebla, Mexico.

The length of the forewings is 6 mm.
