= Treaty of Orihuela =

713 treaty in Iberia

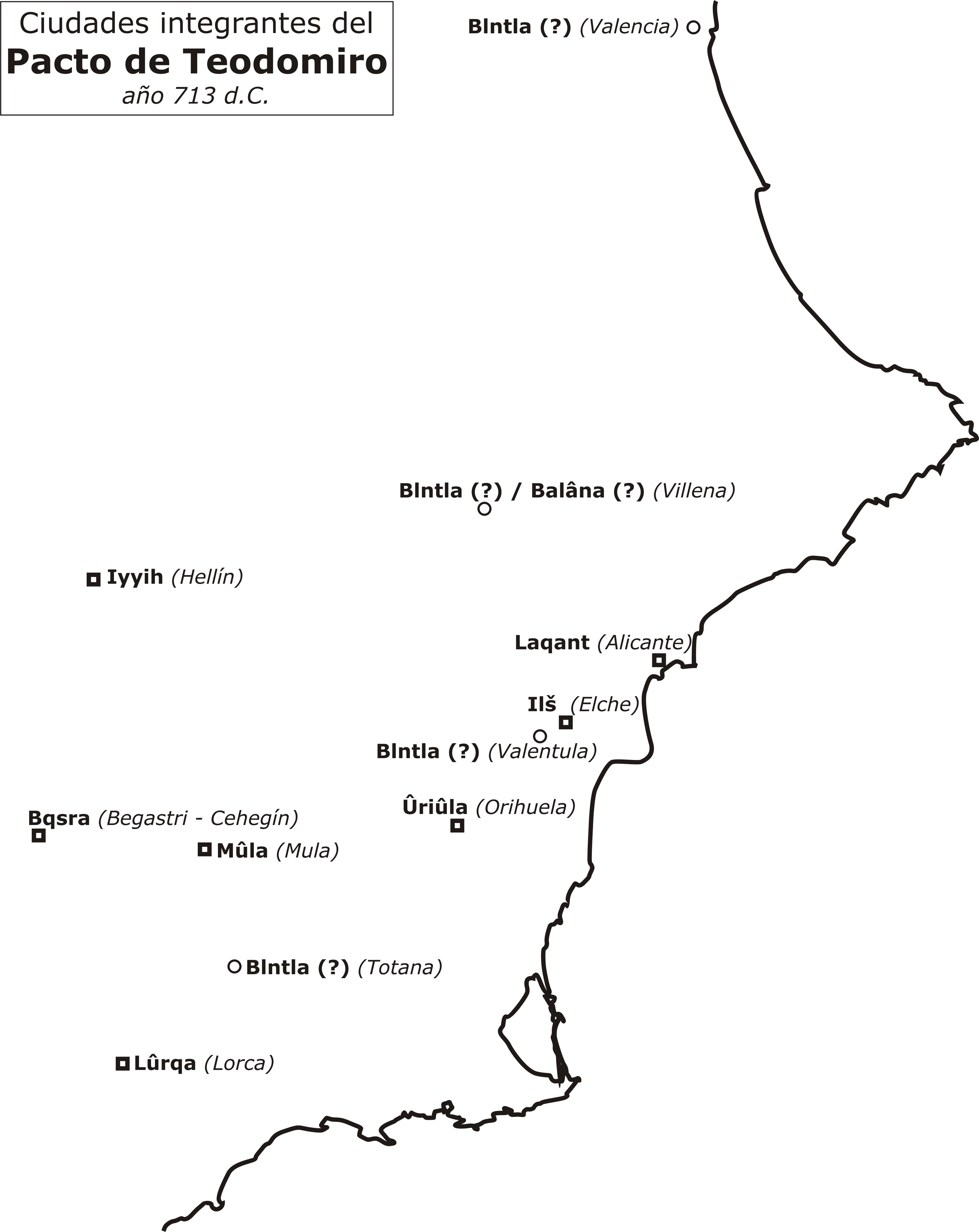
Location of cities forming part of the Treaty of Orihuela, year 713.

Treaty of Orihuela (also known as the Treaty of Tudmir/Theodemir) was an early Dhimmi treaty imposed by the invading Umayyad Caliphate on the Christians in the city of Orihuela in the Iberian Peninsula in 713.

== History ==
The Treaty of Tudmir was a pact made between ‘Abd al-‘Aziz (son of Musa bin Nusair, governor of North Africa) and the Christian Visigoth Theodemir, Tudmir in Arabic (prince and governor of the region of Murcia in the Iberian Peninsula) in the early eighth century. This accord was created in 713 C. E., two years after the Islamic conquest of Spain began; it bears special significance with regard to the Muslims’ diplomatic behavior and their treatment of enemies and conquered peoples. It suggests the Muslims succeeded in a peaceful take-over of southern Spain, specifically Orihuela, Villena, Alicante, Mula, Bigastro, Ello, and Lorca. The agreement stated that the Murcians could keep control and continue to practice their Christian faith but only if they paid the taxes and did not aid Muslim enemies. Although the Treaty of Tudmir itself may not seem to have been particularly noteworthy in its own context, and despite the fact that literature which is germane specifically to the Treaty is somewhat rare, it should be considered important in retrospect due to its cultural, religious, and sociological implications. To better understand these implications, it is important to review an initial course of the Islamic conquest of the Iberian Peninsula.

== Conquest ==
Islamic control spread greatly under the Umayyad caliphate. It had reached all the way to Western Africa in the Maghrib where the Berbers lived. These peoples fought hard and mostly retreated to the mountains while some clans from the main routes and plains of the coast submitted as dhimmis too or converted to Islam and at any case were promptly joined by the Arabs to their military machine. With their superior military arms and skills the caliphs were able to extend their control into Spain.

The first notable Islamic conqueror to enter Spain was the Berber commander Tariq ibn Ziyad. Musá ibn Nusayr was the governor of Northern Africa under the caliph of that period, and it was he who ordered Tariq to make the initial surge into Spain via Gibraltar in spring of the year 711. Once in Gibraltar, Tariq took time to secure a base of operations for his forces and fortified it with a wall, among other defenses. As soon as this was accomplished, Tariq sent an invasion force to the city of Carteya (or Cartaja) and the district of Algeciras, and both were promptly subdued. In little more than two months, Tariq had worked his way steadily through the south of Spain; he began his plunge into central Spain in a battle with the Visigothic King Roderic at Wadi Bakkah. Here, Tariq defeated the army of Roderick against reportedly overwhelming odds. Tariq moved thence to the cities of Écija and Córdoba, effectively ignoring commands he had previously received from Musá to return to Africa or to remain stationary until the governor's arrival in Spain. After attacking and overpowering these cities, Tariq moved on with relative ease as far as Guadalajara, Spain. He quickly took control of Toledo and its surrounding territories before lack of reinforcements from Musá necessitated his withdrawal, whereupon he retreated to Toledo and remained there until Musá himself came to meet him with scorn and jealousy, demanding the spoils of the conquest.

Shortly after Musá arrived in Toledo, the Caliph al-Walid ordered him and Tariq to appear in the royal court in Damascus to speak of their campaign in Spain. Upon Musá's departure for Damascus, he abdicated his authority over the conquered regions to his son ‘Abd al-‘Aziz, who carried on his father’s and Tariq’s work. It was ‘Abd al-‘Aziz who eventually reached the region of Murcia in his conquests, where he encountered and signed a treaty with the above mentioned Visigothic lord of the region, Theodemir. It was this treaty that became known as the Treaty of Tudmir, and the land of Murcia thereafter was known also as Tudmir.

== Musá ibn Nusayr ==
Muslim general in North Africa who led the conquest of Spain. He was known for his great leadership and warrior skills. His origins are slightly unknown but he may have been a freedman linked to the Yemenite tribe and is suggested that his father was a commander of the caliph’s bodyguard. He supported the Caisites against Merwan. After being accused of mistrust, he fled to Egypt and found refuge from its governor ‘Abd al-‘Aziz ibn Marwan, and he changed his support in favor of the reigning caliphs. He became governor of Northern Africa in 698 and quickly extended his control all the way to Maghrib in West Africa, where he took control of the Berbers and integrated them into the Muslim army. September 714 brought an end to the Spanish conquests and the end of Musá’s career. He headed to Damascus with much of the spoils and captives but the caliph al-Walid viewed him with suspicion. Musá died penniless sometime around 716.

== Tariq ibn Ziyad ==
A Berber commander in the Muslim army under Musá ibn Nusayr, he led the conquest into Spain in 711 with about 7,000 soldiers. Where he landed has since been named after him: Gibraltar, or “Jabal Tariq”, which in Arabic means “Mount of Tariq”. He swept through much of southern Spain and conquered the capital of Toledo. It is also said he acquired the bejeweled “table of Solomon” in Alcalà de Henares.

== 'Abd al-'Aziz ==
Son of Musá. He was sent on two operations in Spain: one to the west towards Huelva and the other to the east where he initiated the Treaty of Tudmir in Murcia.

== al-Walid ==
Umayyad Caliph at the time of the initial conquests in the Iberian Peninsula who was influential in the events that led to the development of the Treaty of Tudmir. Al-Walid was the son of 'Abd al-Malik, and his reign was a highly prosperous one. Marked by extravagant building projects and restorations in the new capital of Damascus, the administration of al-Walid was very wealthy, though this affluence was owed in great part to the prudent management of his father from whom he inherited the Caliphate. It was under the rule of al-Walid that the realms of Carthage and the Maghrib in Northern Africa were finally subdued. Musá ibn Nusayr was made governor of the provinces of that region under the order of al-Walid, and from this point, the focus of expansion was set on the Iberian Peninsula. After the conquest of Spain, the spoils of the campaign were handed over to al-Walid, and all three figures gradually faded from notoriety, but it was under the mandate of al-Walid that 'Abd al-'Aziz made the Treaty of Tudmir with Theodemir.

== Theodemir (Tudmir) ==
Christian Visigoth prince of Murcia. The Treaty of Tudmir was made between Theodemir and ‘Abd al-‘Aziz.

== Treaty ==
“In the name of God, the merciful and compassionate. This is a document [granted] by ‘Abd al-‘Aziz ibn Musá ibn Nusair to Tudmir, son of Ghabdush, establishing a treaty of peace and the promise and protection of God and his Prophet) may God bless him and grant him peace). We [‘Abd al-‘Aziz] will not set special conditions for him or for any among his men, nor harass him, nor remove him from power. His followers will not be killed or taken prisoner, nor will they be separated from their women and children. They will not be coerced in matters of religion, their churches will not be burned, nor will sacred objects be taken from the realm, [so long as] he [Tudmir] remains sincere and fulfills the [following] conditions that we have set for him. He has reached a settlement concerning seven towns: Orihuela, Villena, Alicante, Mula, Bigastro, Ello, and Lorca. He will not give shelter to fugitives, nor to our enemies, nor encourage any protected person to fear us, nor conceal news of our enemies. He and [each of] his men shall [also] pay one dinar every year, together with four measures of wheat, four measures of barley, four liquid measures of concentrated fruit juice, four liquid measures of vinegar, four of honey, and four of olive oil. Slaves must each pay half of this amount. {Names of four witnesses follow, and the document is dated from the Muslim month of Rajab, in the year 94 of the Hijra (April 713).}”

== See also ==
- Dhimmi
- History of Spain
- List of treaties
- Timeline of the Muslim Occupation of the Iberian Peninsula
- Reconquista
