= Macasinia =

Scientific classification
- Kingdom: Animalia
- Phylum: Arthropoda
- Class: Insecta
- Order: Lepidoptera
- Family: Tortricidae
- Tribe: Cochylini
- Genus: Macasinia; Razowski & Pelz, 2001

Synonyms
- Mexiculia Razowski & J. W. Brown, 2004

Genus of tortrix moths

Macasinia is a genus of moths belonging to the subfamily Tortricinae of the family Tortricidae.

== Species ==
- Macasinia chorisma Razowski & J. W. Brown, 2004
- Macasinia furcata Razowski & Pelz, 2001
- Macasinia minifurcata Razowski & Becker, 2002
- Macasinia mirabilana Razowski & Becker, 2002
- Macasinia vilhena Razowski & Becker, 2007

== See also ==
- List of Tortricidae genera
