= Moors and Christians of Villena =

Traditional festival in Villena, Spain

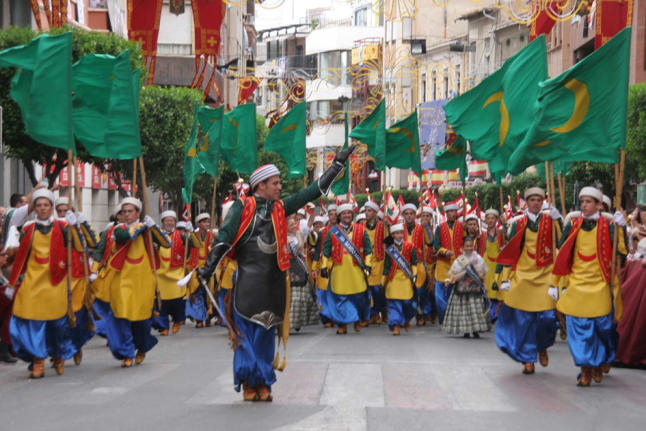
A Moor comparsa at La Entrada parade in Villena

The Moors and Christians of Villena (Spanish: Moros y Cristianos de Villena), is a Marian patronal festival held annually in Villena, Spain, from 4th September to 9th September. It is celebrated in honor of Nuestra Señora de las Virtudes (Our Lady of the Virtues), an invocation of Mary, who is venerated as the city's patron saint and guardian against the Plague.

The festival in Villena has been declared a Festival of National Tourist Interest in Spain. With approximately 15,000 participants, it is one of the largest Moors and Christians festivals in Spain. The festival involves a high number of local participants relative to similar events in Spain. The procession features 14 comparsas (groups), half of which belong to a Moorish side and the other half to a Christian side, all dedicated to the Virgen de La Morenica, a local title for the Virgin Mary.

The main events of the festival take place from September 4th to 9th, with preliminary activities beginning on September 4th. Parades such as La Entrada (the Entrance Parade), held on the night of September 5th, or La Cabalgata Nocturna (the Great Night Parade) on September 6th, can last as long as seven or eight hours. Approximately 120 local and regional marching musical bands, from various regions of south-eastern Spain, also take part in the festivities.

== History ==
The festival traces its origins to 1474, when the Virgen de las Virtudes (Virgin of the Virtues) was proclaimed patroness of the town and its protector against the plague.

In its current form, the Moors and Christians festival combines three types of festivities:

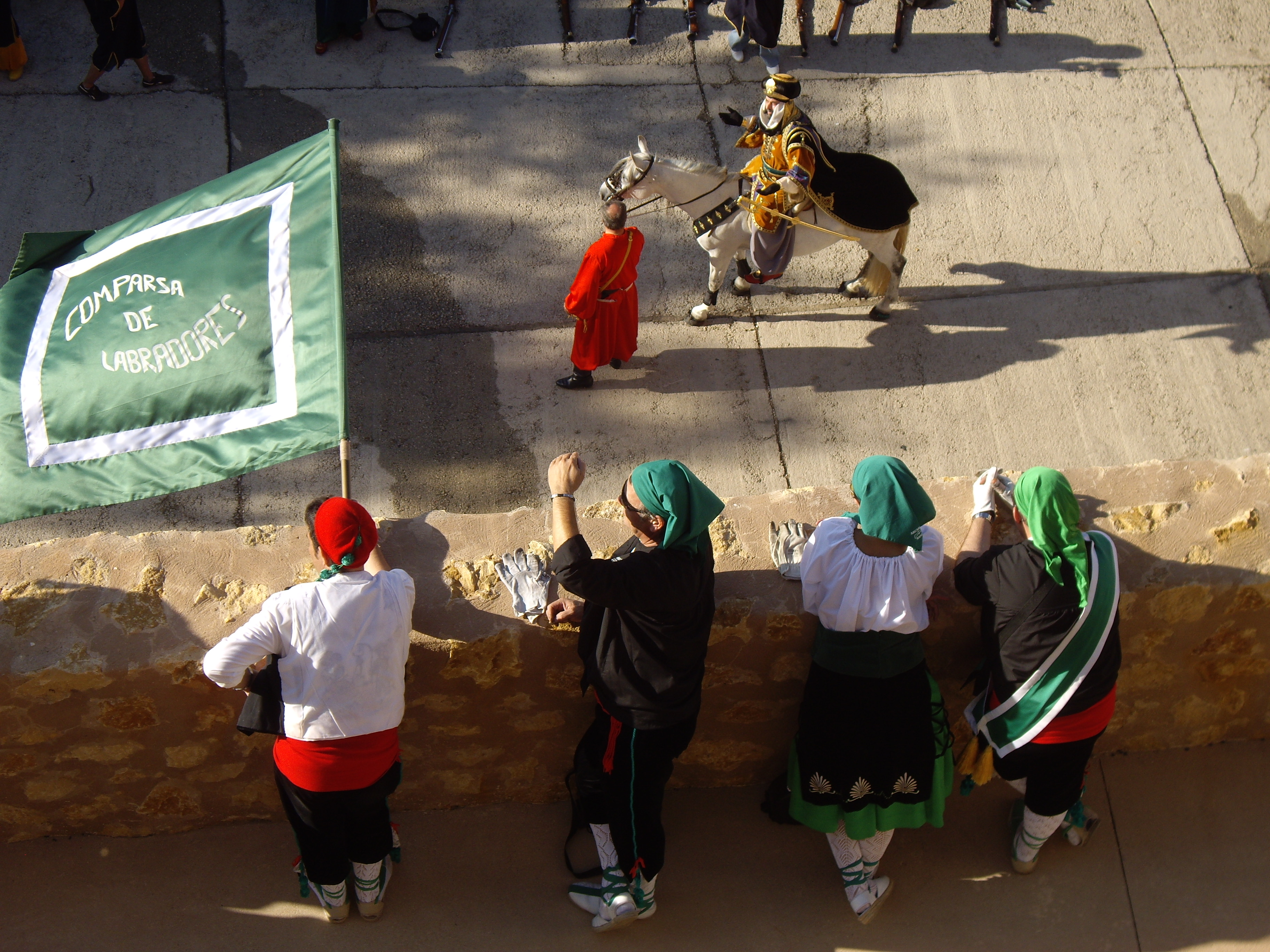
First Embajadas play at Atalaya Castle.

- Patron saint festival: a religious event consisting of processions accompanying a statue of the Virgin Mary.
- Military festival (alarde): originating in the creation of the kingdom’s militia (later called the soldiery), which participated in the patronal festival. This influence can be seen in La Entrada, a parade in which all the festeros (celebrants) stand in formation, grouped by comparsas in full costume, advancing to the rhythm of Moorish marches, Christian marches, or pasodobles composed for the festivities.
- Historical play and/or reenactment: a metaphorical evocation of episodes from Spanish history. The festival features embajadas (embassies), guerrillas (skirmishes), volleys of arquebuses, landings, conversions of the Moors to Christianity, and other historical motifs that resonate in cultural memory.

Las Embajadas (the Embassies) consist of a series of plays whose current version dates from 1810–1815. The plot revolves around an ambassador attempting to negotiate with the defenders of the city’s fortress, the Atalaya Castle in Villena. The dialogue escalates, revealing the ambassador’s intention to take the stronghold. After a battle with arquebuses, the invading army captures the castle. The roles are reversed two days later.

== The Comparsas ==
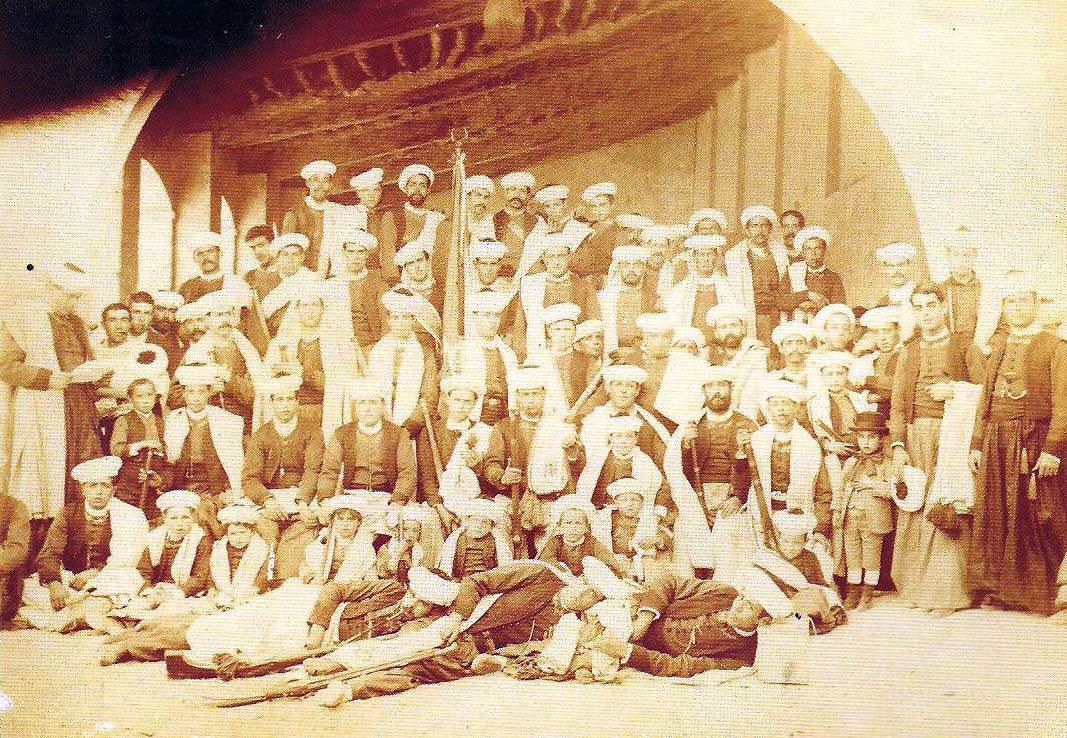
Comparsa of Moros Nuevos in 1884.

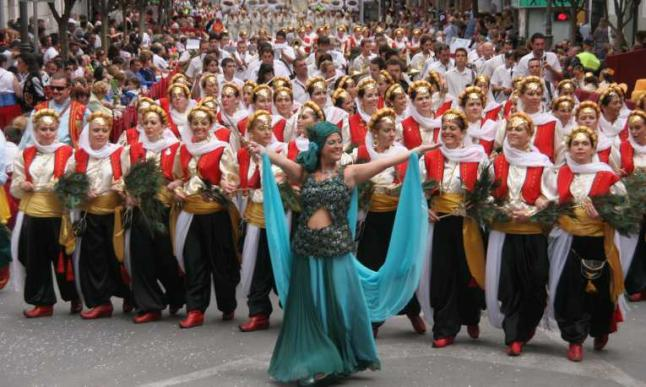
Comparsa of Moros Nazaríes marching on La Entrada parade.

In Villena, there are 14 comparsas or associations: seven of them are from the Moorish side and seven from the Christian side:

Moorish side: Moros Viejos (Ancient Moors), Moros Nuevos (New Moors), Bando Marroquí (Moroccan Band), Moros Realistas (Royalist Moors), Moros Nazaríes (Nazarite Moors), Moros Bereberes (Berber Moors), and Piratas (Pirates).

Moros Viejos (Ancient Moors)	Moros Nuevos (New Moors)	Bando Marroquí (Moroccan Band)	Moros Realistas (Royalist Moors)	Moros Nazaríes (Nazarite Moors)	Moros Bereberes (Berber Moors)	Piratas (Pirates)

Christian side: Estudiantes (Students), Marinos Corsarios (Corsair Sailors), Andaluces (Andalusians), Labradores (Farmers), Ballesteros (Crossbowmen), Almogávares (Almogavars), and Cristianos (Christians).

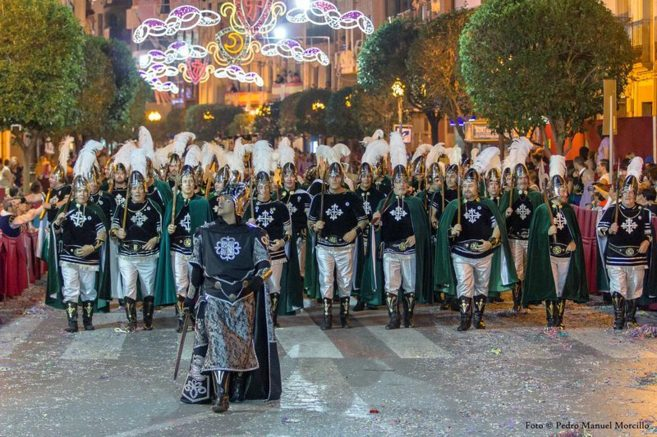
Squad from the Comparsa of "Cristianos"

Estudiantes (Students)	Marinos; Corsarios (Corsair; Sailors)	Andaluces (Andalusians)	Labradores (Farmers)	Ballesteros (Crossbow- men)	Almogávares (Almogavars)	Cristianos (Christians)

== Special Squads and Costume Industry ==
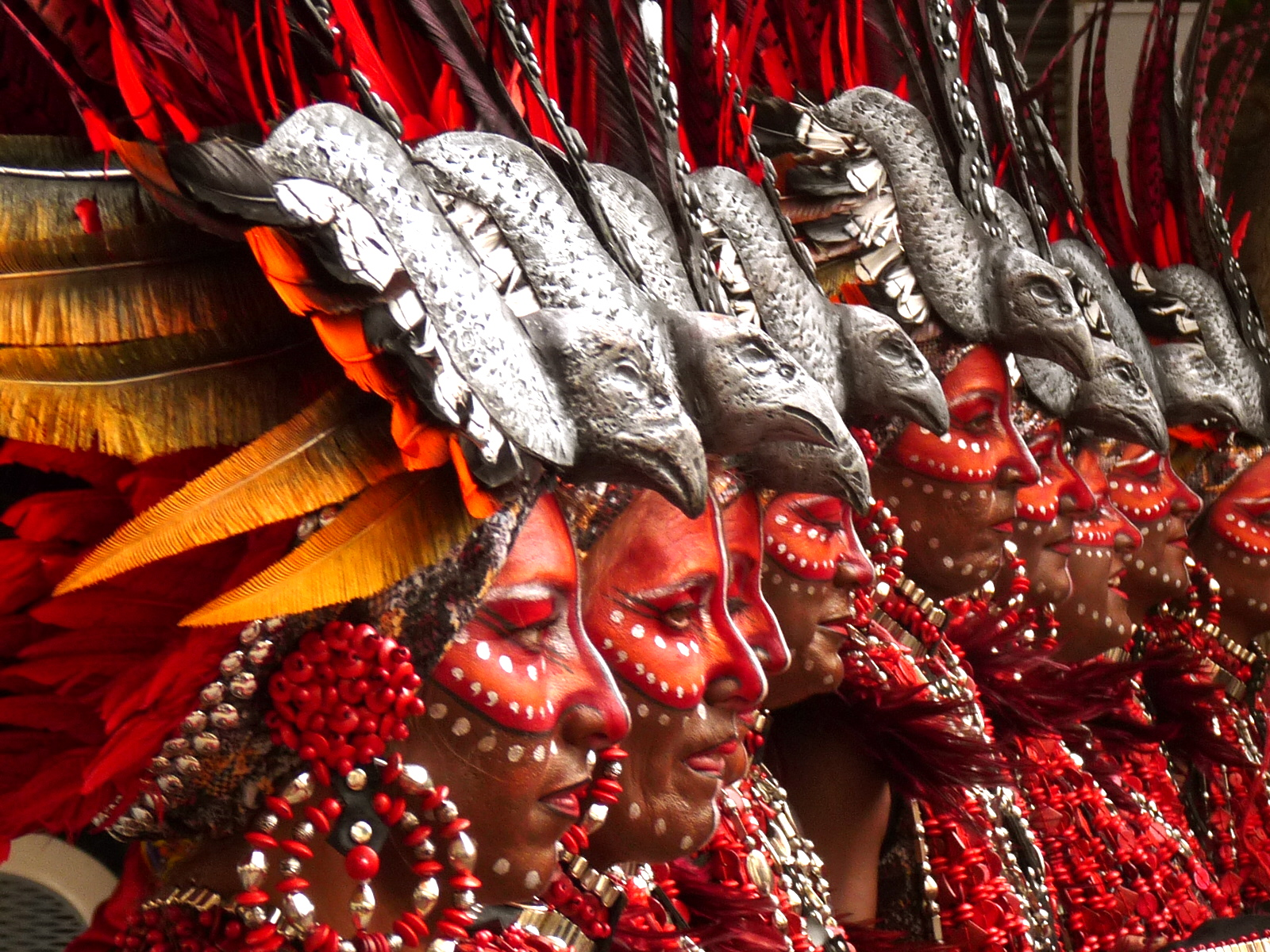
A women’s special squad. La Entrada parade, 2009

Interest in the historical authenticity of costumes has increased alongside the proliferation of “special squads” (Escuadras Especiales), a phenomenon that spread in the second half of the 20th century. In each comparsa, the number of special squads has been limited to one per every hundred participants to help preserve traditional costumes in the parades, and their new costumes are first worn each year on the day of the La Entrada parade.

These special costumes are created and produced in Villena by the groups that wear them during the festival. Since the 1970s, a local costume‑making industry has developed, leading to specialized fairs related to footwear, leather goods, textiles, precious stones, metals, and other crafts involved in the festival. After the festival, these special costumes are rented to squads from other towns to help recoup some of their costs. As a result, the costume industry has created jobs, particularly for footwear, leather goods, precious stones, textiles, metals, makeup, and other related crafts.

== See also ==
- Moros y cristianos
- Villena
