= Macasinia minifurcata =

Scientific classification
- Kingdom: Animalia
- Phylum: Arthropoda
- Clade: Pancrustacea
- Class: Insecta
- Order: Lepidoptera
- Family: Tortricidae
- Genus: Macasinia
- Species: M. minifurcata

Binomial name
- Macasinia minifurcata Razowski & Becker, 2002

Species of moth

Macasinia minifurcata is a species of moth of the family Tortricidae. It is found in Carchi Province, Ecuador.

The wingspan is 16-17.5 mm.
