= Macasinia furcata =

Scientific classification
- Kingdom: Animalia
- Phylum: Arthropoda
- Class: Insecta
- Order: Lepidoptera
- Family: Tortricidae
- Genus: Macasinia
- Species: M. furcata

Binomial name
- Macasinia furcata Razowski & Pelz, 2001

Species of moth

Macasinia furcata is a species of moth of the family Tortricidae. It is found in Morona-Santiago Province, Ecuador.
