= La Zafra =

Place in Alicante, Spain

Coordinates: 38°44′39″N 0°51′05″W

La Zafra (in Valencian La Safra) is a minor local entity in the municipality of Villena, in the Alhorines Valley, in the comarca of Alto Vinalopó, Alicante. Its population has declined significantly since 1970, when it numbered 235 people, to the present day, when only 12 people are registered. However, the permanent population is usually just one or two families.

== Geography ==
IIt is located in the middle of the Valle de los Alhorines, at the foot of the Alto de la Zafra — one of the peaks of the Sierra de Benejama — in the foothills. The village lies in an area of orchards with scattered farmhouses. These lands have been used for cultivating cereal crops and grazing livestock since at least Andalusian times. The term "Alhorines" itself attests to its agricultural importance, as it comes from the Arabic word الهري (al-horī), meaning "underground deposit" or "granary."

The village consists of approximately fifteen houses, some of which have been renovated in anticipation of an increased population during the summer months. In 2002, a population of Biscutella dufourii was discovered here, the only one in the province of Alicante and the southernmost. In 2007, an important population of Campanula mollis, a small annual plant, was found.

== History ==
The Alhorines area, where the town is located, has been occupied since the Bronze Age. The ancient Via Heraclea passed through here. The Romans paved it and renamed it the Via Augusta. Remains of the Via Augusta are still visible in the vicinity of the hamlet.

From the 13th century until the beginning of the 18th century, the valley was the cause of conflicts between Villena, Caudete, and Onteniente. These conflicts ended when Felipe V demarcated the boundaries.

The partida is mentioned several times in the Relación sent to Felipe II in 1575, where it is spelled "la Çafra." This name comes from the Arabic word صخرة ṣaḫra meaning "crag." References to the Alhorin conflicts also appear in the response to Chapter 37. The following description of La Zafra appears in the Dictionary of Madoz (1845-1850):

Cas[hamlet] of the prov[ince] of Alicante [...] and the jurisdictional term[place] of Villena. Sit[uated] to the NE. of the same c[city], at the dist[ance] of 4 leg[leagues]. It comprises 10 houses of field all grouped together and the land that constitutes its endowment will barely reach 400 fan[egas]; it is of inferior quality, and its main crop consists of wine : in this part[ ] some pine forest of private property is preserved. Madoz Dictionary.

During the Civil War, many of the more than 3,000 refugees who arrived in Villena were settled in La Zafra and the surrounding area. The population began to decline in the 1970s due to rural exodus. In 2004, there was talk of installing a primate center in La Zafra. This idea was met with considerable opposition from the people and the Popular Party (PP), which was in the opposition at the time. Ultimately, the facility was approved in Sierra de Salinas in late 2008.

== Heritage ==
- Ermita de San Isidro Labrador: This simple building has a brick belfry and was first mentioned in 1780 as an annex of the Santiago Apóstol de Villena parish. Offices for the eastern part of the valley (La Gloria) were held here after the Ermita de Nuestra Señora del Pilar was abandoned. The building is listed as an Asset of Local Significance.[3]
- Via Augusta: The ancient Via Augusta passed near the hamlet, and small fragments of it are still visible along the modern path that runs alongside it. The path was opened between La Zafra and San Juan del Pas (Traiguera, Castellón) in 2010.

== Culture ==
The inhabitants of Zafra speak Valencian, given their physical proximity to the towns of Fuente la Higuera and Fontanares, which are located approximately 8 km away; and Spanish. Despite this, Zafra belongs to Villena, whose core is just over 22 km away.

The patron saint festivities in honor of San Isidro Labrador are celebrated on the first weekend after the feast of San Isidro (May 15).
