= Macasinia vilhena =

Scientific classification
- Kingdom: Animalia
- Phylum: Arthropoda
- Clade: Pancrustacea
- Class: Insecta
- Order: Lepidoptera
- Family: Tortricidae
- Genus: Macasinia
- Species: M. vilhena

Binomial name
- Macasinia vilhena Razowski & Becker, 2007

Species of moth

Macasinia vilhena is a species of moth of the family Tortricidae. It is found in Rondônia, Brazil.

The wingspan is about 9.5 mm.
