= Atalaya Castle (Spain) =

Cultural property in Villena, Spain

Coordinates: 38°37′55″N 0°51′9″W

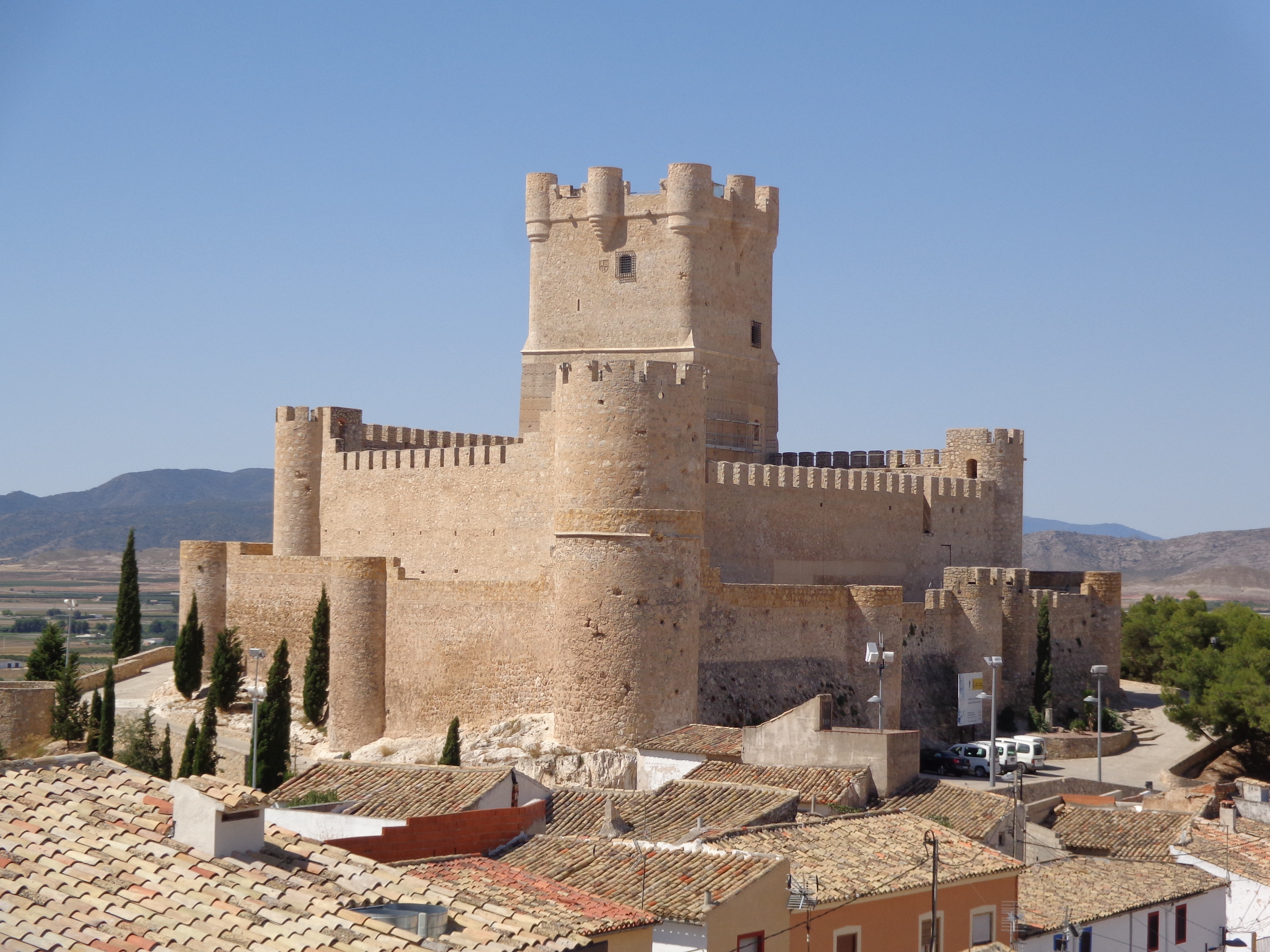
Castle of Villena.

The Atalaya Castle (Spanish: Castillo de la Atalaya or Castillo de Villena, English: Castle of the Watch) is a fortress in Villena, province of Alicante, southern Spain. Located over a spur of the Sierra de la Villa, in the north-western part of the province of Alicante, it commands the former frontier between Castile and Kingdom of Aragon.

== History ==
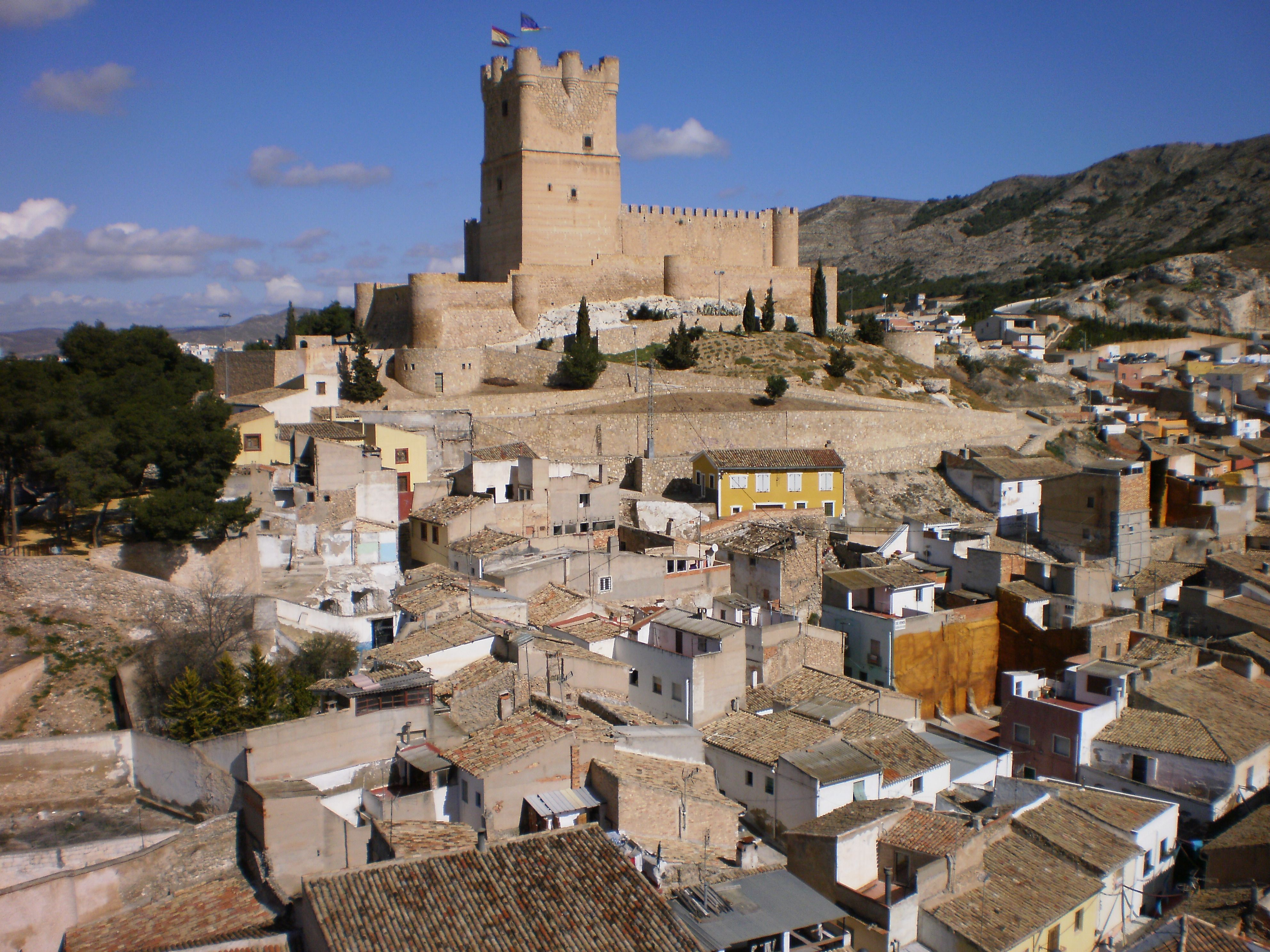

The fortress was built in an unknown age, although not after the 12th century, since Arab sources mention it in 1172. It has been speculated that the fortification could have been built over a Roman castrum or villa, but no proof of this has been found.

The fortress was an important stronghold on the northern frontier of the Islamic emirate of Iberia, and proof of its robustness is the fact that the fortification resisted to three different sieges laid by James I of Aragon. He was finally able to conquer it in 1240, sending an army led by the knights of the Order of Calatrava, with almogavar mercenaries, under the command of Ruy Pérez Ponce de León, Commander of Alcañiz. These incursions involved a violation of the Treaty of Cazola, according to which Villena belonged to the Castilian conquest. The castle would definitely be in hands of the Kingdom of Castile after the Treaty of Almizra of 1244. It was first given to the Order of Calatrava, but was soon acquired by Infante Manuel when he became lord of Villena. Here resided his son, writer Juan Manuel, Prince of Villena, who made reforms to improve the security of the fortress, in order to defend his fiancee, the princess Constanza of Aragon. In the XIV century, the Lords of Villena were succeeded as proprietors by Alfonso of Aragon and Foix, the first Marquis of Villena.

In 1476 the citizens of Villena, encouraged by the Catholic Monarchs, rebelled against the marquesses. After this event, the castle stopped to be residence of the marquesses, and, together with the city, became a royal possession.

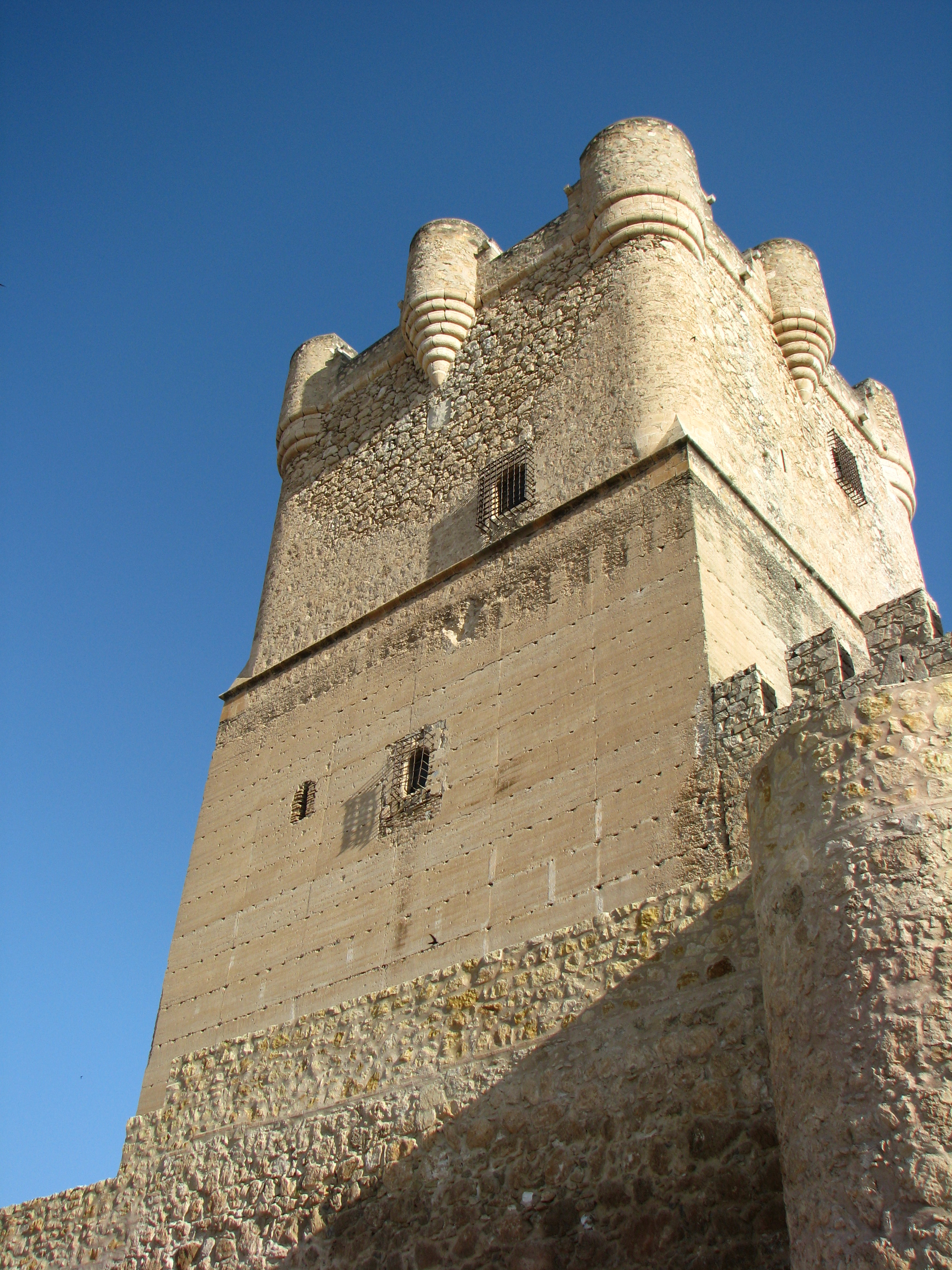
The keep.

During the Revolt of the Brotherhoods (1519–1523), viceroy Diego Mendoza took refuge in the fortress after his defeat at Gandía, and from here set out the troops which restored the royal power in Spain. During the War of Spanish Succession (1701–1713), 50 Bourbon loyalist troops sustained a siege of 8 days from the biggest part of the Austrian army. The castle was abandoned after the loot perpetrated by the French Marshal Suchet in the course of the Peninsular War (early 19th century). A first restoration was carried out in 1958. The castle is now in good conditions and is the centre of the yearly Moros y Cristianos festival.

The castle was declared a Historical-Artistic Monument in 1931.

== Description ==
The entrance of the castle is oriented to NW; two other entrances are now closed. Across the upper part of the external wall is a chemin-de-ronde connecting all the towers. Within the inner gate remains have been excavated, which are thought to belong to Sanctuary of the Virgin of the Snow, whose existence was known from written documents.

The fortress has a concentric plan, with an inner and higher line of walls forming a square, and with a rectangular barbican forming a larger inner space in front of the keep. The inner square polygonal in plan, with round towers at the corners, aside from one which is occupied by the keep. These walls were built in the Almohad era, and were covered in the 15th century by order of Don Juan Pacheco. Over this sector is another path leading to the keep. The latter and the towers have rectangular merlons.

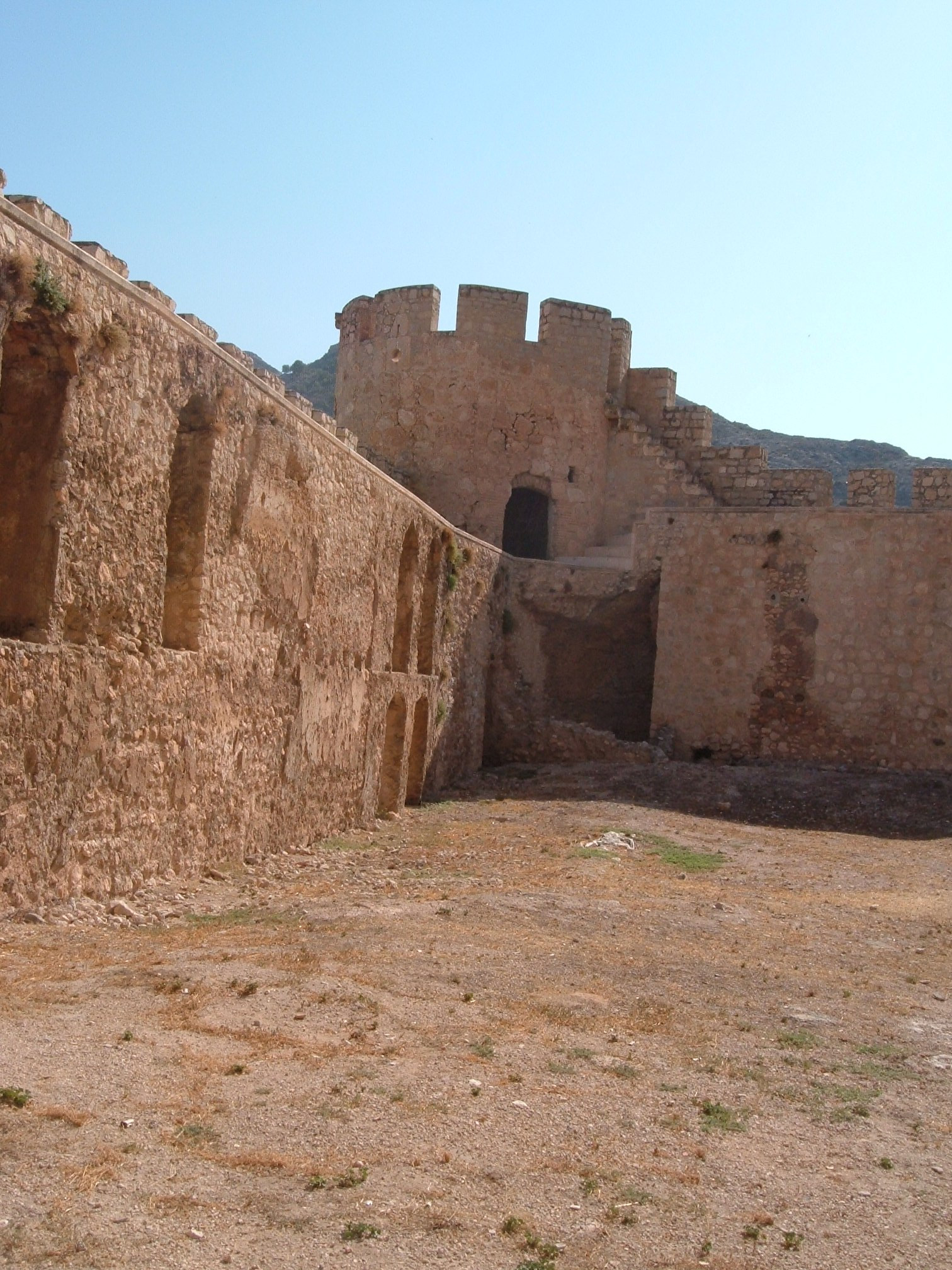
Central square of the castle.

The keep is quite higher than the other fortifications. Its lower sections were built in Almohad times using the rammed earth technique. The small entrance leads to a 7x7 m hall, whose walls have an average thickness of 3.5 m, and which is covered by an Almohad ceiling from the 12th century.

The stairs leading to the upper sections house a reproduction of a graffitied khamsa, the original being in Villena's Museum. The mid hall has also an Almohad ceiling. The two upper sections were built in the mid-15th century.

== See also ==
- Route of the Castles of Vinalopó
- Camino del Cid
- High medieval domes
