= Villena =

- City and municipality
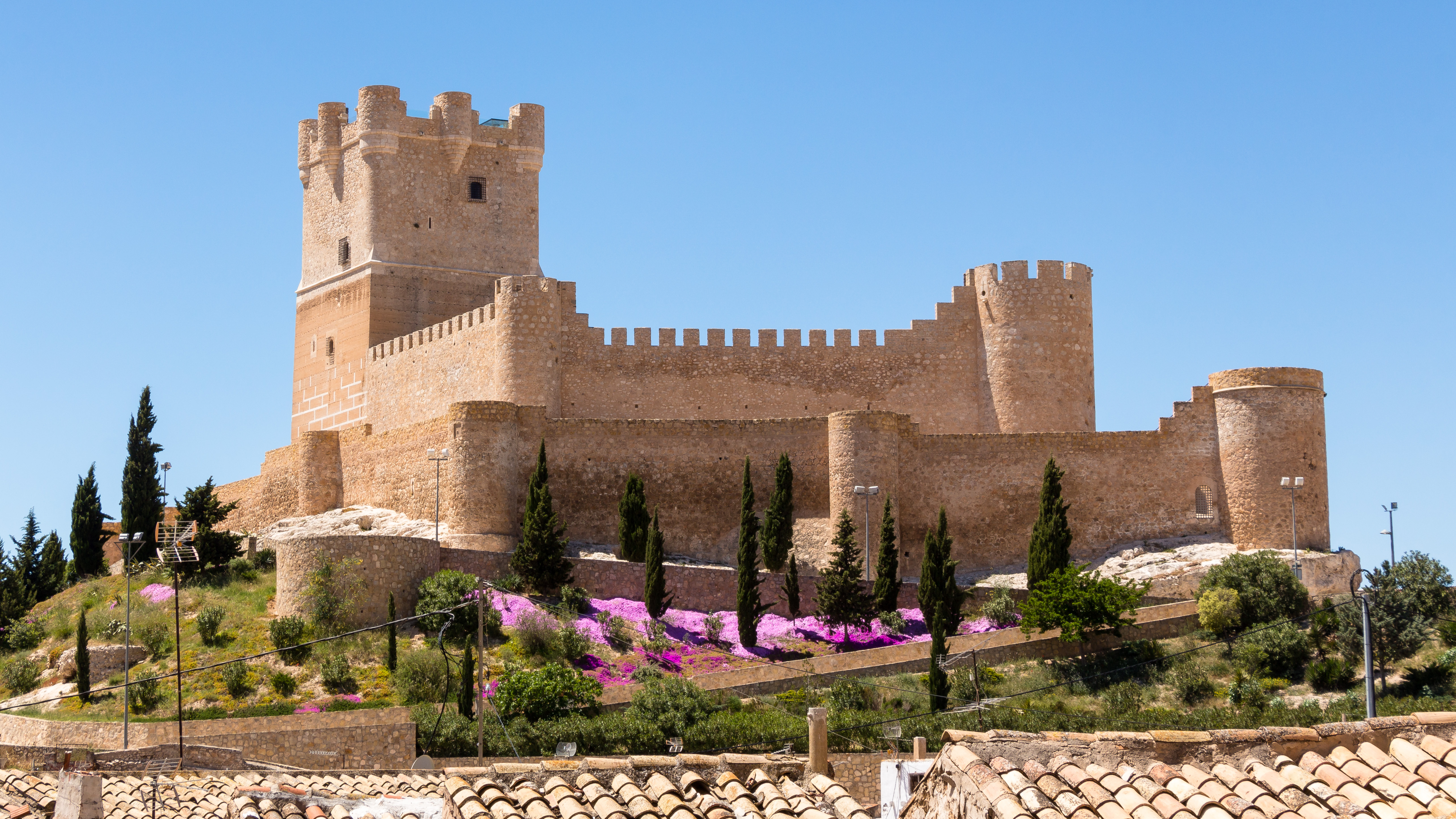

- Flag Coat of arms
- Motto: Villena ¡un tesoro!
- Location within Province of Alicante Location within Valencian Community Location within Spain
- Coordinates: 38°38′6″N 0°51′57″W
- Country: Spain
- Autonomous Community: Valencian Community
- Province: Alicante
- Comarca: Alto Vinalopó
- Populated places: 16 populated places: Villena; Casas de Menor; Casas de Cabanes y las Fuentes; Casas de Jordán; Cascante; El Morrón; Las Chozas; La Gloria; La Encina; La Puentecilla; Las Tiesas; Las Virtudes; La Zafra; San Bernabé; Santa Eulalia; Sierra de Salinas

Government
  - Alcalde (Mayor): Francisco Javier Esquembre Menor (LVE)

Area
  - Total: 345.6 km^{2} (133.4 sq mi)
- Elevation: 505 m (1,657 ft)

Population (2025-01-01)
  - Total: 34,712
  - Density: 100.4/km^{2} (260.1/sq mi)
- Demonyms: Villenan • villenero/a, also villenense (Sp.) • villener, -a (Val.)
- Official language(s): Spanish; Valencian
- Linguistic area: Spanish
- Time zone: UTC+1 (CET)
  - Summer (DST): UTC+2 (CEST)
- Postal code: 03400
- Website: Official website

Villena (Note: Pronunciation of Villena: Spanish: [biˈʎena] Valencian: [viˈʎena]) is a city and municipality in Spain, in the Valencian Community. It is located at the northwest part of Alicante, and borders to the west with Castilla-La Mancha and Murcia, to the north with the province of Valencia and to the east and south with the province of Alicante. It is the capital of the comarca of the Alto Vinalopó. The municipality has an area of 345.6 km² and a population of 34,144 inhabitants as of INE 2023.

There is evidence of settlement in the area from Middle Paleolithic. However, it is on dispute if the current city dates from visigothic times or before, though certainly it existed in the 11th century, during the Muslim period. After the Christian conquest, it became Seigneury, Principality, Duchy and finally Marquisate, until the people, encouraged by the Catholic Monarchs, revolted against the marquis. In 1525 Charles V conceded the title of City to Villena. This is the most economically prosperous period, as shown by the monuments that survived to nowadays. Although a railway station was inaugurated in 1858, economy kept being mainly agricultural until the rural exode that took place in the 1960s. Then, the economic model changed rapidly so that currently economy is based mainly on tertiary sector and industry, chiefly footwear, construction and furniture.

The historical city and surroundings contain an important group of historical remains, including two castles and several churches, hermitages, palaces and squares, as well as a number of museums, standing out the Archaeological Museum "José María Soler". Among the main cultural events are the Moors and Christians festival and the Concurso de Jóvenes Intérpretes "Ruperto Chapí" (Young Interpreters Contest).

== Toponymy ==
The first known name of the area is Ad Turres, which appears in the Vascula Apollinaria and has been identified with some of the Roman villas or postae in the Via Augusta itinerary, at some point between Villena and Font de la Figuera. Near the latter there is evidence of an old Tower already ruined by the 14th century. As for the origin of the term Villena, there is some polemic. Menéndez Pidal proposed an evolution from a hypothetic antroponym Bellius or Vellius and the suffix -ana, as in Lucena (Lucius + -ana) or Maracena (Marcus + -ana), which would give the Roman word Belliana or Velliana. However, Belliana or Bellius have not been documented in Roman times, as well as the evolution from Belliana to Villena involves several phonetic difficulties. So, Domene Verdú indicates that the origin of the toponym would be the term بليانة Bilyāna, purely Arabic, meaning "the filled (by Allah)". This Arabic term, documented from the 11th century on, evolved in two ways. On the one hand, following the rules of Medieval Spanish, to Belliena, as is written in the Historia Roderici (around 1180). On the other hand, Belliena was replaced by the Aragonese term Billena after the Christian conquest, which was carried out mostly by Aragonese. The current spelling was consolidated around the 15th century, since Spanish had totally lost the distinction between [b] and [v] and writing was attracted by the word villa, meaning "town".

== Symbols ==
The coat of arms of Villena has been used traditionally since at least 1477, but has never been made official. The castle in the first quarter comes from the symbol of the Crown of Castile, whereas the lion in the second quarter and the winged hand in the third are legacy of don Juan Manuel, second lord of the city. The three pinetrees and the pond in the fourth quarter refer to the Lagoon of Villena or the Fuente del Chopo, formerly big wealth sources for the city; the first as a salt evaporation pond and the second as a source of fresh water. The crown is a symbol of the marquisate of Villena. As the coat of arms has never made official, there are different versions according to the City Hall's terms of office, as well as certain polemic about the position of the second and third quarter.

== Physical geography ==
Villena is placed northwest in the province of Alicante, in the comarca of Alto Vinalopó. It is in the middle of an important crossroad which links the Valencian Community, the Region of Murcia and Castile-La Mancha, in a natural corridor known as Villena's Corridor or Vinalopó's Corridor, since the river Vinalopó flows through the municipal territory of Villena. This corridor has been of capital importance since prehistoric times (this is the place where the Via Augusta led first into the Meseta Central), and, being at the middle of towns as Biar, Sax, Font de la Figuera, Yecla or Caudete made Villena an important transports junction. Villena's municipality, having an area of 345,6 km^{2} in the second widest in the province of Alicante.

== History ==
Villena region played an important role during the Bronze Age, and in the development of early metallurgy.

Cabezo Redondo is an important archaeological site of the Bronze Age located on a hill 2 km from the town of Villena. It was a regional center inhabited between 1500 and 1100 BC, and probably belonged to Argaric culture.

After the Islamic conquest of the Iberian Peninsula the city was called Medina Bilyana (Arabic: مدينة بليانة) and was one of the seven cities mentioned in the Treaty of Tudmir. Calatrava knights conquered the city by the king James I of Aragon. This caused some tensions between Castile and Aragon, since Villena should have been reserved to Castile under the treaties of Tudilén and Cazorla, so both crowns had to sign new treaties: The Treaty of Almizra, Torrellas and Elche.

After the Christian conquest, Villena becomes the capital of an important seigneury, later duchy, principality and marquisate, until the popular rebellion against the Marquis, instigated by the Catholic Monarchs.

=== Ancient gold hoards ===
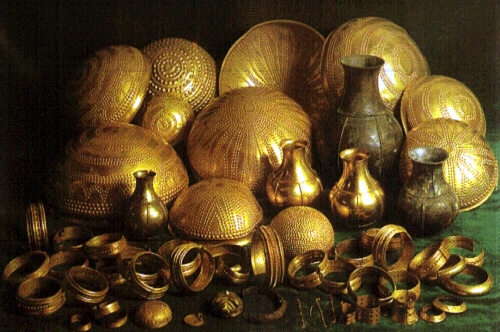
Treasure of Villena, the second biggest gold hoard in Europe

The Cabezo Redondo gold hoard was an important archaeological find. The treasure was discovered in the spring of 1963 by the Spanish archaeologist José María Soler García, and it contains 35 items of jewelry, including a tiara, finger rings, bracelets, and pendants.

Treasure of Villena, another find that is much bigger, was also hidden in the Cabezo Redondo area, near Villena, by its ancient inhabitants. This was also found, in December 1963, by José María Soler García. It is the most important ancient treasure find in the Iberian Peninsula and the second one in Europe, just behind that from the Royal Graves in Mycenae, Greece.

This find was not made at Cabezo Redondo, itself, but at the Rambla del Panadero, 5 km east of Villena. Nevertheless, it is believed that, based on its resemblance to the previous Cabezo Redondo hoard, the trove was buried by the ancient inhabitants of Cabezo Redondo.

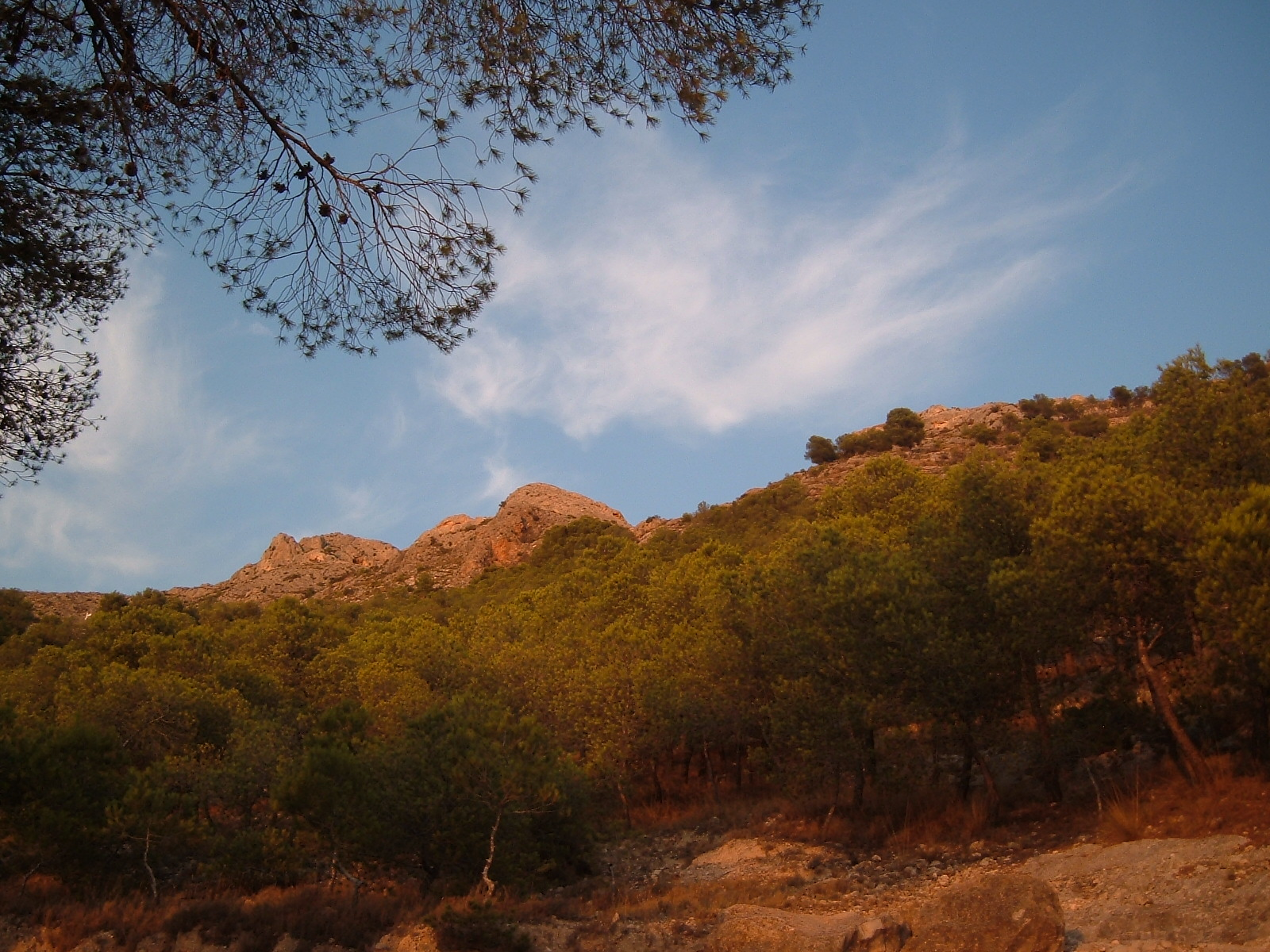
Sierra de la Villa mountain; close-up the pine grove, up in the right the Salvatierra castle ruins.

== Main sights ==
- Castle of la Atalaya, built by the Moors in the 11th century.
- Municipal Palace
- Saint James Church, a late Gothic Catholic church.
- Archaeological Museum. Founded by archaeologist José María Soler García, it contains the Treasure of Villena.

== Events ==
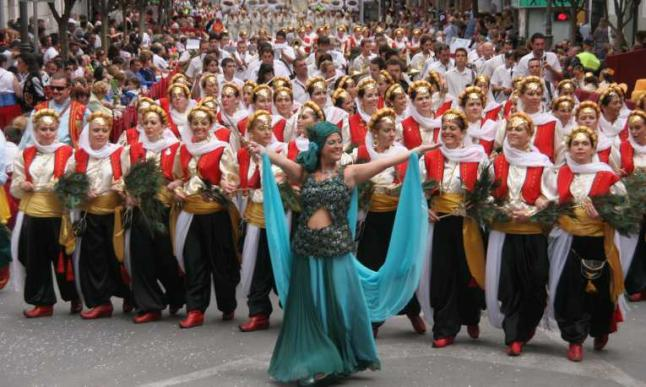
Moros y Cristianos Festival, in September

Villena is home to the most crowded festival of Moros y Cristianos in Spain.

It is also home to one of the biggest rock / heavy metal festivals in Spain, Leyendas del Rock, which takes place every August.

== Economy ==
The economy of the city is based on footwear (like in the neighbouring cities of Elda and Novelda), pottery, furnitures and wines.

== Sport ==
Juan Carlos Ferrero, former world no. 1 tennis player, developed the Ferrero Tennis Academy, which has produced such players as Guillermo García-López and Carlos Alcaraz.

== Transport ==
Villena is located close to Autovía A-31. It has two railway stations; Villena AV serving AVE high-speed rail services on the Madrid–Levante high-speed rail network, and Villena, which sees Renfe local and regional trains.

== Famous citizens ==
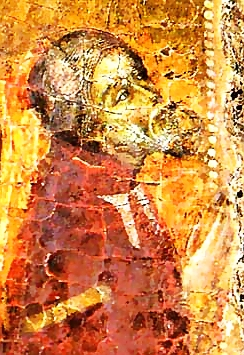
Don Juan Manuel, Prince of Villena

- Ambrosio Cotes, Renaissance composer.
- José García Hidalgo, Baroque painter.
- Joaquín María López, former Prime Minister of Spain.
- José María Soler, archaeologist.
- Ruperto Chapí, zarzuela composer.
- Juan Carlos Ferrero, tennis player.
- Pablo Menor, Jesuit priest.
- Antonio Navarro Santafé, sculptor.
- Carlos Alcaraz, tennis player.

== Twin cities ==
- Escalona, Spain, since 1982, on the occasion of the 700th anniversary of the birth of don Juan Manuel, who was lord of Villena, Escalona and Peñafiel.
- Peñafiel, Spain, since 1982, on the occasion of the 700th anniversary of the birth of don Juan Manuel, who was lord of Villena, Escalona and Peñafiel.

== See also ==
- Moors and Christians of Villena
- Revolt of the Brotherhoods
- Seigneury of Villena
- Taifa of Murcia
- Treaty of Almizra
- Treaty of Orihuela
- Route of the Castles of Vinalopó
- War of the Castilian Succession
- War of the Two Peters
