= Arbori =

Commune in Corsica, France

- Commune
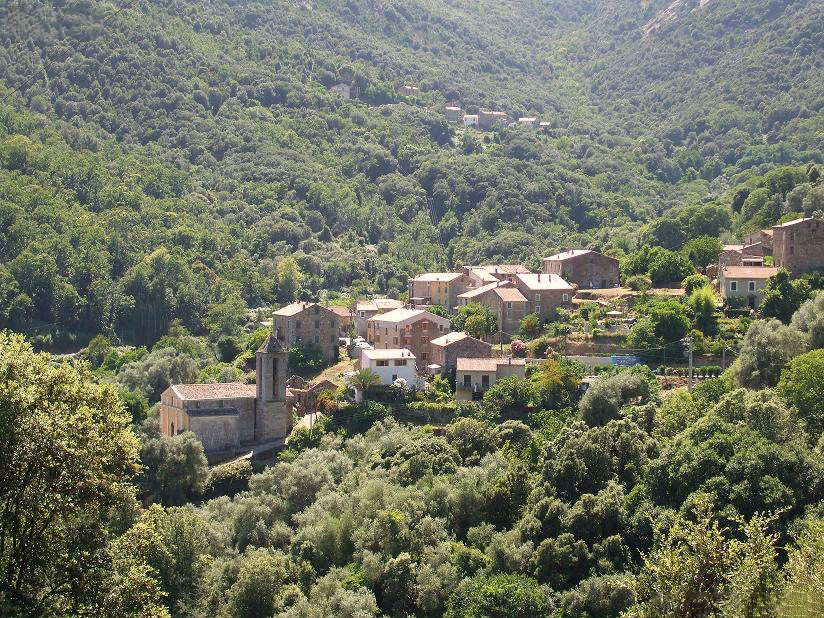
- Arbori Village
- Location of Arbori
- Location within France Location within Corsica
- Coordinates: 42°08′34″N 8°47′51″E
- Country: France
- Region: Corsica
- Department: Corse-du-Sud
- Arrondissement: Ajaccio
- Canton: Sevi-Sorru-Cinarca

Government
  - Mayor (2020–2026): Paul Chiappella
- Area^{1}: 20.03 km^{2} (7.73 sq mi)
- Elevation: 345 m (1,132 ft)
- Highest elevation: 882 m (2,894 ft)
- Lowest elevation: 13 m (43 ft)
- Population (2023): 53
  - Density: 2.6/km^{2} (6.9/sq mi)
- Time zone: UTC+01:00 (CET)
  - Summer (DST): UTC+02:00 (CEST)
- INSEE/Postal code: 2A019 /20160
- ^{1} French Land Register data, which excludes lakes, ponds, glaciers > 1 km^{2} (0.386 sq mi or 247 acres) and river estuaries.

Arbori (French pronunciation: [aʁbɔʁi]; Corsican: Arburi) is a commune in the Corse-du-Sud department of France on the island of Corsica.

== Geography ==
Arbori is located in a direct line some 12 km south of Marignana and 20 km north of Sarrola-Carcopino. Access to the commune is by the road D1 which runs by a tortuous route north from Sari-d'Orcino through the commune to the village then continues north to Vico. Apart from the village there are also the hamlets of Mercolaccia and Parapoghiu. The commune is remote, mountainous, and heavily forested although with a small patch of farmland in the centre.

The eastern and southern border is formed by the river Liamone, which flows south and then west, from its confluence with the Cruzini.

== Administration ==
List of Successive Mayors

From	To	Name
2001	2008	Marie-France Padovani Leca
2008	2020	Jean Pierre Giaferri
2020	2026	Paul Chiappella

== Demography ==
The inhabitants of the commune are known as Arborais or Arboraises in French.

Historical population

Year	Pop.	±% p.a.
1800	329	—
1821	351	+0.31%
1846	449	+0.99%
1872	567	+0.90%
1901	623	+0.33%
1926	504	−0.84%
1946	232	−3.80%
1962	148	−2.77%
1968	140	−0.92%

Year	Pop.	±% p.a.
1975	122	−1.95%
1982	92	−3.95%
1990	62	−4.81%
1999	63	+0.18%
2007	66	+0.58%
2012	59	−2.22%
2017	54	−1.76%
2023	53	−0.31%

Source: EHESS and INSEE

== Sites and Monuments ==
- The "Pont de Truja" (Truja Bridge) between Arbori and Lopigna (1809) is registered as an historical monument.
- The "Parish Church of the Assumption" contains a Statue: Virgin and child (19th century) which is registered as an historical object.
- The "Castaldu" was an old fortified chateau that was razed in 1489 by the Genoese.

== Notable people linked to the commune ==
- Santu Casanova, poet.
- Pierre Toussaint Leca (Petru Leca) (1879-1951 at Nice). Poet in the French and Corsican languages, founded L’Aloès, a Mediterranean Journal.
- Raffè di Leca
- Giovan Paolo di Leca (1445-1515), the last Count of Corsica.

== See also ==
- Communes of the Corse-du-Sud department
