= Cantons of the Corse-du-Sud department =

The following is a list of the 11 cantons of the Corse-du-Sud department, in France, following the French canton reorganisation which came into effect in March 2015:

- Ajaccio-1
- Ajaccio-2
- Ajaccio-3
- Ajaccio-4
- Ajaccio-5
- Bavella
- Grand Sud
- Gravona-Prunelli
- Sartenais-Valinco
- Sevi-Sorru-Cinarca
- Taravo-Ornano
