= Azzana =

Commune in Corsica, France

Azzanas
- Commune
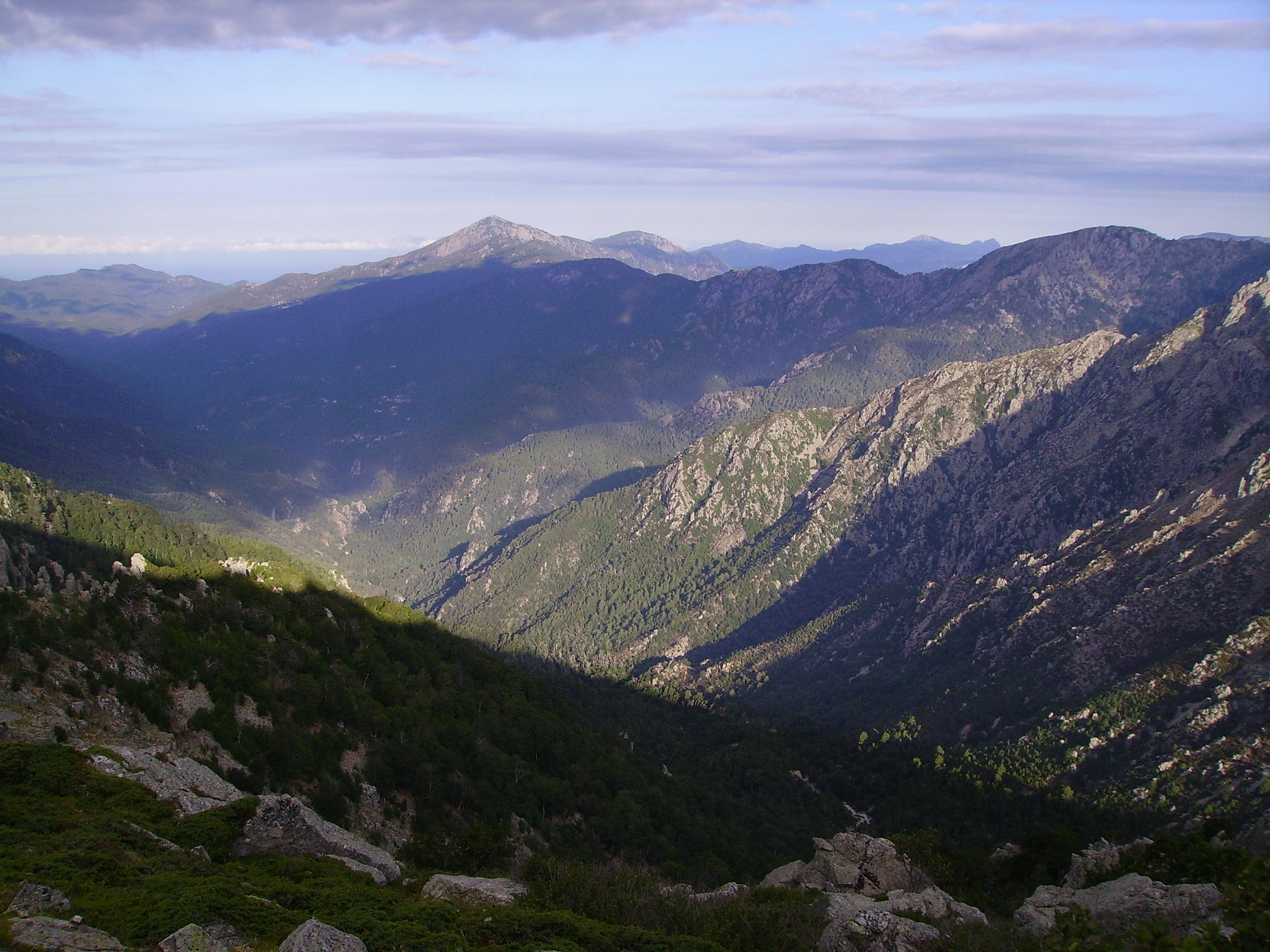
- The Cruzzini from the GR20 trail
- Location of Azzanas
- Location within France Location within Corsica
- Coordinates: 42°07′06″N 8°55′29″E
- Country: France
- Region: Corsica
- Department: Corse-du-Sud
- Arrondissement: Ajaccio
- Canton: Sevi-Sorru-Cinarca
- Intercommunality: Spelunca-Liamone

Government
  - Mayor (2020–2026): Thiery Leca
- Area^{1}: 12 km^{2} (4.6 sq mi)
- Elevation: 400 m (1,300 ft)
- Highest elevation: 1,506 m (4,941 ft)
- Lowest elevation: 226 m (741 ft)
- Population (2023): 49
  - Density: 4.1/km^{2} (11/sq mi)
- Time zone: UTC+01:00 (CET)
  - Summer (DST): UTC+02:00 (CEST)
- INSEE/Postal code: 2A027 /20121
- ^{1} French Land Register data, which excludes lakes, ponds, glaciers > 1 km^{2} (0.386 sq mi or 247 acres) and river estuaries.

Azzana is a commune in the Corse-du-Sud department on the island of Corsica, France.

== Geography ==
Azzana is located approximately 13 km northeast of Casaglione and 10 km northwest of Bocognano. The commune is accessible via road D4, which runs from Salice in the west, passes through the centre of the commune and the village, and continues east to Rezza. Road D125 extends southwest from the village to Lopigna. In addition to the main village, there is a hamlet called Vignamajo to the south. The area is remote and rugged, characterized by snow-capped mountains in the north and south and extensive forests.

The river Liamone flows through the centre of the commune, south of the village, and continues west to the sea at Liamone. The Cruzzini, a tributary of the Liamone, also traverses the commune.

== Administration ==
List of Successive Mayors

From	To	Name	Party
1988	2014	Jean-Pierre Giacomoni	DL then UMP then LR
2014	2026	Thierry Leca	DVD

== Population ==
The inhabitants of the commune are known as Azzanais or Azzanaises in French.

Historical population

Year	Pop.	±% p.a.
1800	318	—
1821	498	+2.16%
1846	304	−1.95%
1872	368	+0.74%
1901	510	+1.13%
1926	291	−2.22%
1946	150	−3.26%
1962	200	+1.81%
1968	193	−0.59%

Year	Pop.	±% p.a.
1975	149	−3.63%
1982	81	−8.34%
1990	54	−4.94%
1999	56	+0.40%
2007	53	−0.69%
2012	40	−5.47%
2017	54	+6.19%
2023	49	−1.61%

Source: EHESS and INSEE

== Culture and heritage ==
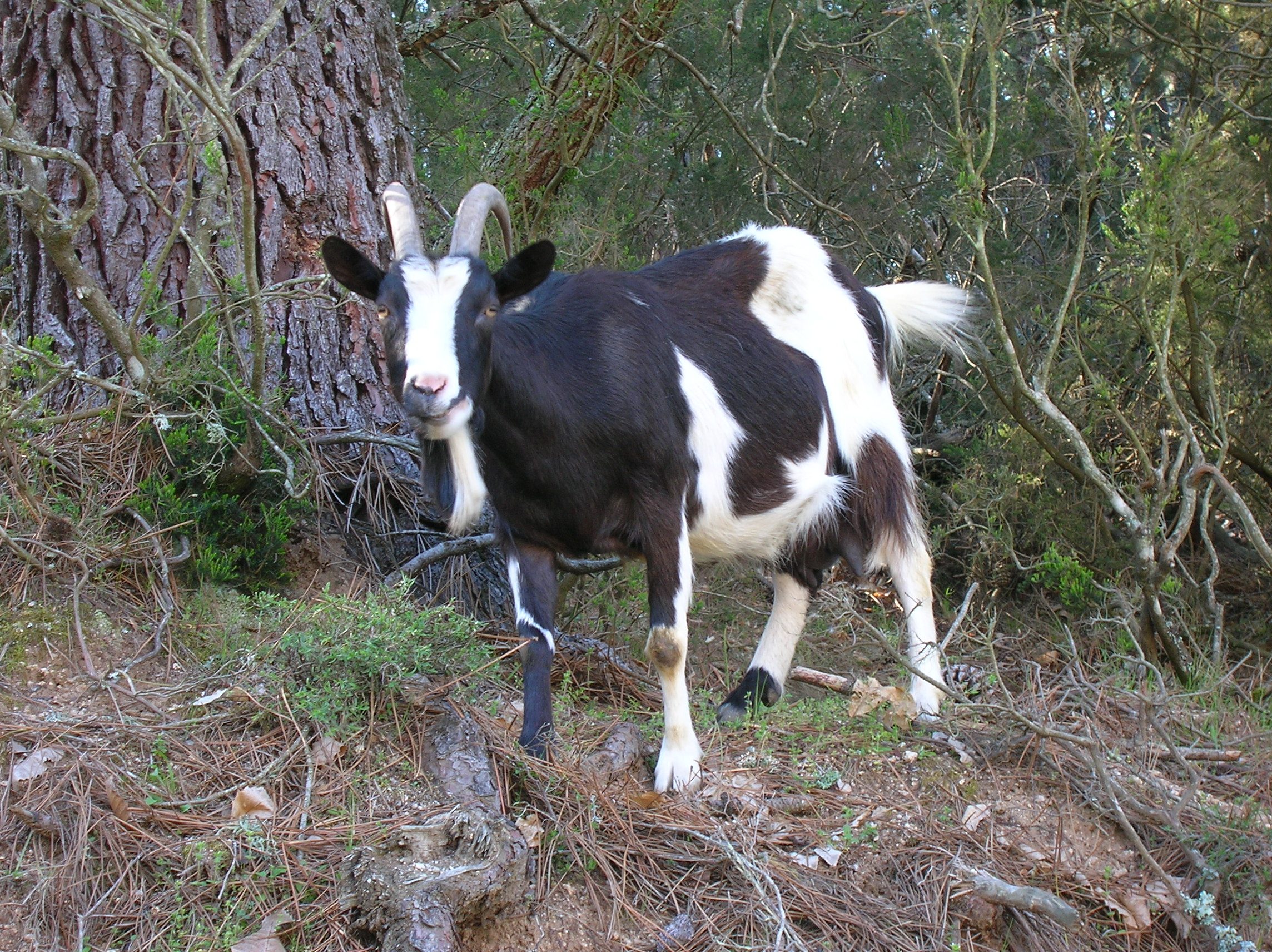
A Goat in Azzana

=== Civil heritage ===
The commune has a very large number of buildings and structures that are registered as historical monuments.

=== Religious heritage ===
The commune has several religious buildings and structures that are registered as historical monuments:

- The Funeral Chapel of the Marcangeli family (1935)
- The old Chapel Sainte-Lucie (18th century). The chapel contains many items that are registered as historical objects:
  - A Sunburst Monstrance (20th century)
  - A Statue: Saint Lucie (19th century)
  - A set of 2 Choir Candlesticks (19th century)
  - A Crown Light fixture (2) (19th century)
  - A set of 2 Crown Light fixtures (1) (19th century)
  - A Sanctuary Lamp (19th century)
  - A Chasuble and Stole (20th century)
  - A set of 2 Bells (1929)
  - A set of 2 Altar Vases (19th century)
  - An Altar Vase (1) (19th century)
  - A set of 2 Cruets (19th century)
  - A Chalice with Paten (19th century)
  - A Baptismal font (18th century)
  - A Ciborium (2) (18th century)
  - A Ciborium (1) (1883)
  - The Furniture in the Church (1883)
- The Church of Notre-Dame of Mount Carmel (18th century)
- The Cemetery at Vallemajo (19th century). The Cemetery contains two items that are registered as historical objects:
  - A Tombstone of Julie Ottaviani (1900)
  - A Funerary Cross (1886)
- The Tomb of Marie-Antoinette Vellutini (1923)
- The Cemetery for the Antonietti and Vellutini families (19th century). The cemetery contains two items that are registered as historical objects:
  - A Funerary Cross of Marie-Dominique Antonietti (1895)
  - A Funerary Cross of Paul Marie Antonietti (1902)
- The Funeral Chapel at Croce (19th century)
- The former Parish Church of Saint-Nicolas de Bari (18th century). The church contains one item that is registered as an historical object:
  - A Baptismal font (18th century)

== See also ==
- Communes of the Corse-du-Sud department
