= Deux-Sevi =

Deux-Sevi is a region of Corsica, located on its west side in the province of Vico. It is also the name of the canton constituted by these communes. It is between Filiosorma and Deux-Sorru. In the Corsican language, the inhabitants are called Sivinchi. The territory also has multiple UNESCO world heritage sites.

== Communes ==
Deux-Sevi is composed of the communes of Cargèse, Cristinacce, Evisa, Marignana, Osani, Ota, Partinello, Piana, and Serriera.

== Access ==
Deux-Sevi is crossed by the road D81, which connects Bastia to Ajaccio by the western littoral. Beyond the Palmarella pass, to the north, is Filosorma. The D84 road that connects Porto on the D81 to the RN193 to Francardo in the Golo Valley connects via the Vergio Pass and the Niolo. The last road access to this area of Corsica is via the old RN195 (currently D70) via the Sevi Pass, which gave its name to this region and connects it to Sorro, a region in Vico.

The jagged coast offers little shelter to navigation. Only a small fishing port called Porto exists. The Girolata Cove, the destination of many excursions and boat-walks which come from Calvi and Ajaccio in summer, offers only a relative shelter from the prevailing southwesterly gusts. The coast, from Scandola to Cargèse, contains a multitude of flora and fauna, such as ospreys, bearded vultures, bighorn sheep, and groupers.

== History ==
=== Antiquity ===
In Ptolemy's description of Corsica in the 2nd century, Ptolemy mentions the Kerouinoi as one of the 12 people inhabiting the island. There was also Roman influence: a female bust was found in Piana, and burial graves and funeral urns were found at Osani, Ota, and Partinello.

=== Middle Ages ===
Sia was the pieve of Porto valley. Since corsairs, specifically the Barbarians made frequent invasions and enslaved people, it was nearly deserted. By around 1520, the only inhabited places were Sia, Ota, Sevenentro, Cristinachie, Marignano, Evisa, Taxo, and Laragio. In the year 1455, the Turkish also began raiding the coast. Because of this, coastal villages were abandoned. To defend the population, coastal towers were built. Despite this, the Church of St. John the Baptist and the parish church of Paomia. In 1540, the Genoese, led by Zannetino Doria, captured Girolata, as well as Dragut, a respected and feared Turkish admiral.

=== Depopulation ===
At the beginning of the second half of the sixteenth century, the Office of St. George ordered the depopulation of Sia because of the insubordination of its inhabitants to the Lordship of Leca. In addition, hunger and famine in the years 1582-1583 depopulated 29 communities in the region, including Paomia, Rivinda and Salognu.

=== Jewish community ===
Between the sixteenth century and the seventeenth century, the city of Padua in Italy was largely populated by Jews. A malicious rumor that their Buda had committed acts of cruelty against the Christians triggered a surge of brutality against the Jewish community. It is thanks to the intervention of a Franciscan father named Father Marco that the Jewish community escaped the announced massacre. A large part of the Jewish community of Padua decided, following these events, to emigrate. Some arrived in Corsica, and the inhabitants named them Padovani, meaning "those who come from Padua". The name Padovani is a common name in Corsica today.
