= Arrondissement of Ajaccio =

Coordinates: 41.9267°N 8.7369°E

Ajaccio
- Arrondissement
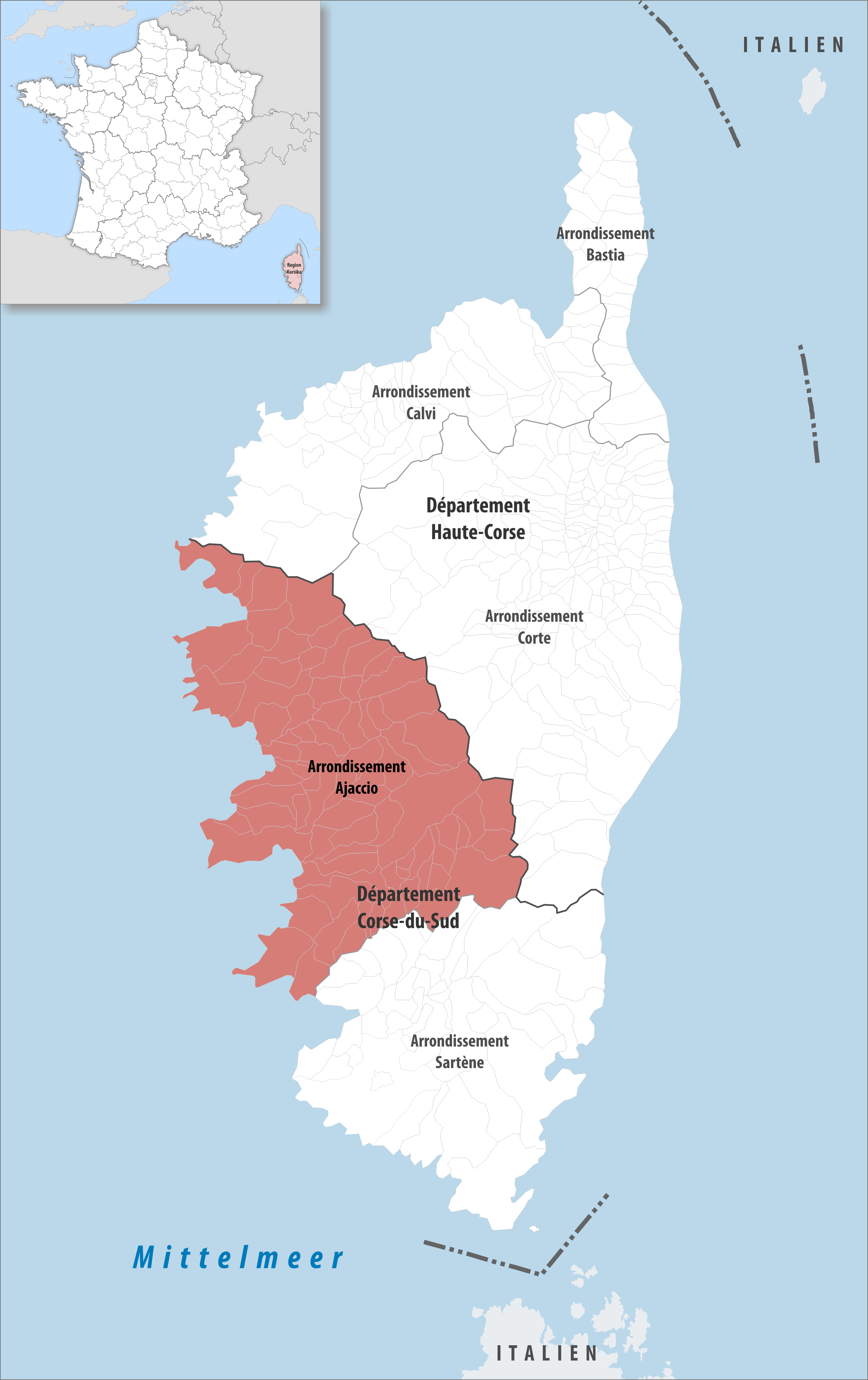
- Location within the region Corsica
- Country: France
- Region: Corsica
- Department: Corse-du-Sud
- No. of communes: {{{nbcomm}}}
- Area: 2,224.4 km^{2} (858.8 sq mi)
- Population (2023): 125,120
  - Density: 56.249/km^{2} (145.68/sq mi)
- INSEE code: 2A1

The arrondissement of Ajaccio (French: arrondissement d'Ajaccio; Corsican: circundariu di Aiacciu) is an arrondissement (district) in the department of Corse-du-Sud in the French territorial collectivity of Corsica. Covering an area of 2,224.4 km^{2} (858.8 sq mi), it incorporates 81 communes. As of 2023, the population was 125120 inhabitants. The capital is located at the city of Ajaccio, which serves as a significant economic, cultural, and administrative hub for the island of Corsica. The region is characterized by a diverse landscape ranging from coastal areas and beaches to mountainous terrain. It is a major destination fr tourism, and the arrondissement has a well-developed transportation network including an international airport and a major port.

== History ==
Ajaccio was first mentioned in a letter by Pope Gregory I in the 7th century CE. The Genoese took control of it in the late 13th century, and built a citadel along the Barbary Coast in 1492. It came under French occupation briefly in 1553 before being returned to the Genoese six years later. It was permanently ceded by the Genoese to the French, following the Treaty of Versailles in 1764. It is also notable as the birthplace of Napoleon Bonaparte in 1769, and his family home remains a significant historical site. The arrondissement of Ajaccio was established in 1800 as part of the then-department of Liamone. From 1811 to 1976, it formed an arrondissement of the department of Corse. Following administrative changes in 1976, it became an arrondissement of the department of Corse-du-Sud. In March 2017, the commune of Olivese was transferred to Ajaccio from the arrondissement of Sartène.

== Geography ==
Ajaccio is an arrondissement (district) in the department of Corse-du-Sud in the French territorial collectivity of Corsica. It stretches across an area of 2,224 km^{2} (859 sq mi), encompassing the western coastal region around the Gulf of Ajaccio and extending inland across Corsica’s rugged mountain massifs.

== Administration ==
As a result of the reorganisation of the cantons of France which came into effect in 2015, the borders of the cantons are no longer related to the borders of the arrondissements. The arrondissement of Ajaccio was organized into 14 cantons–Ajaccio-1, Ajaccio-2, Ajaccio-3, Ajaccio-4, Ajaccio-5, Ajaccio-6, Ajaccio-7, Bastelica, Celavo-Mezzana, Cruzini-Cinarca, Les Deux-Sevi, Les Deux-Sorru, Santa-Maria-Siché, and Zicavo. There are 81 communes in the arrondissement of Ajaccio:

1. Afa (2A001)
2. Ajaccio (2A004)
3. Alata (2A006)
4. Albitreccia (2A008)
5. Ambiegna (2A014)
6. Appietto (2A017)
7. Arbori (2A019)
8. Arro (2A022)
9. Azilone-Ampaza (2A026)
10. Azzana (2A027)
11. Balogna (2A028)
12. Bastelica (2A031)
13. Bastelicaccia (2A032)
14. Bocognano (2A040)
15. Calcatoggio (2A048)
16. Campo (2A056)
17. Cannelle (2A060)
18. Carbuccia (2A062)
19. Cardo-Torgia (2A064)
20. Cargèse (2A065)
21. Casaglione (2A070)
22. Cauro (2A085)
23. Ciamannacce (2A089)
24. Coggia (2A090)
25. Cognocoli-Monticchi (2A091)
26. Corrano (2A094)
27. Coti-Chiavari (2A098)
28. Cozzano (2A099)
29. Cristinacce (2A100)
30. Cuttoli-Corticchiato (2A103)
31. Eccica-Suarella (2A104)
32. Évisa (2A108)
33. Forciolo (2A117)
34. Frasseto (2A119)
35. Grosseto-Prugna (2A130)
36. Guagno (2A131)
37. Guargualé (2A132)
38. Guitera-les-Bains (2A133)
39. Letia (2A141)
40. Lopigna (2A144)
41. Marignana (2A154)
42. Murzo (2A174)
43. Ocana (2A181)
44. Olivese (2A186)
45. Orto (2A196)
46. Osani (2A197)
47. Ota (2A198)
48. Palneca (2A200)
49. Partinello (2A203)
50. Pastricciola (2A204)
51. Peri (2A209)
52. Piana (2A212)
53. Pietrosella (2A228)
54. Pila-Canale (2A232)
55. Poggiolo (2A240)
56. Quasquara (2A253)
57. Renno (2A258)
58. Rezza (2A259)
59. Rosazia (2A262)
60. Salice (2A266)
61. Sampolo (2A268)
62. Santa-Maria-Siché (2A312)
63. Sant'Andréa-d'Orcino (2A295)
64. Sari-d'Orcino (2A270)
65. Sarrola-Carcopino (2A271)
66. Serra-di-Ferro (2A276)
67. Serriera (2A279)
68. Soccia (2A282)
69. Tasso (2A322)
70. Tavaco (2A323)
71. Tavera (2A324)
72. Tolla (2A326)
73. Ucciani (2A330)
74. Urbalacone (2A331)
75. Valle-di-Mezzana (2A336)
76. Vero (2A345)
77. Vico (2A348)
78. Villanova (2A351)
79. Zévaco (2A358)
80. Zicavo (2A359)
81. Zigliara (2A360)

== Demographics ==
As of 2023, the region had a population of 125,120 inhabitants, up from approximately 107,451 in 2011. The population consisted of about 48% male and 52% female. As of 2022, there were 78,943 dwellings, composed of 53,808 primary residences (68.2%), 22,871 secondary homes (29%), and 2,265 (2.9%) vacancies. Among primary residences, 55.4% were apartments, 44% were individual houses, and had an average size of 3.7 rooms per unit.

As of 2022, there were 5,574 employer establishments with 68% in trade and transport, 13.2% in construction, 11.3% in public administration, 5.4% in industry, and 2.2% in agriculture. Amongst the eligible population, 52,631 people were employed, with 46.8% in commerce and transport, 37% in service or public sectors, and 16.2% in other sectors. Of the employed people, 83.7% were salaried employees. The median disposable income per household unit was €24,100, with a poverty rate of 14.2%. The average monthly wages were €2,413.6 with a gender pay gap of 11.9% overall. The unemployment rate was 6.1%, compared to the national rate of approximately 7.5%.

== Transport ==
Ajaccio is served by an Ajaccio Napoleon Bonaparte Airport, the island's busiest airport. It serves as the headquarters of Air Corsica, and connects to various destinations in Europe. The region has a good network of roads and communal bus services. The port of Ajaccio is connected to the French mainland with regular ferry services.
