= Cruzzini =

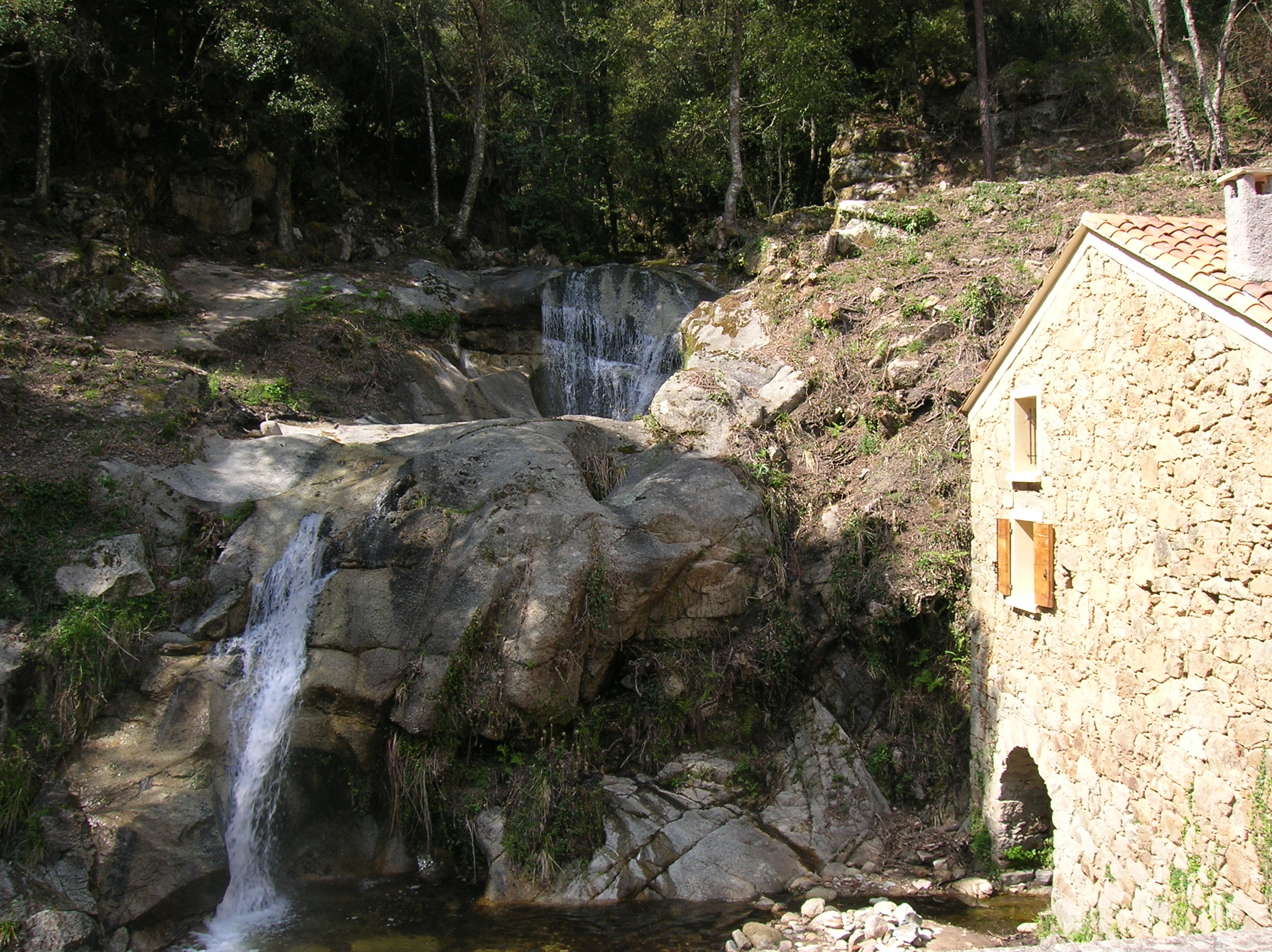
- Rezza Mill on the Cruzzini

- Location within Corsica Location within France
- Native name: Cruzinu (Corsican)

Location
- Country: France
- Region: Corsica
- Department: Corse-du-Sud

Physical characteristics
- Mouth: Liamone
  - coordinates: 42.1163°N 8.8214°E
- Length: 27.64 kilometres (17.17 mi)

Basin features
- Progression: Liamone→ Mediterranean Sea

The Cruzzini (French pronunciation: [kʁutsini]; or Cruzini; Corsican: Cruzinu) is a river in the center of the department of Corse-du-Sud, Corsica, France. It is a tributary of the river Liamone. The valley is isolated, heavily wooded, and surrounded by high and steep mountains. There is little tourism, and the population is poorer and older than in the island as a whole.

== Course ==
The Cruzzini is 27.64 kilometres (17.17 mi) long. It crosses the communes of Azzana, Lopigna, Pastricciola, Rezza, Rosazia and Salice. It rises in the commune of Pastricciola on the border with the department of Haute-Corse to the south of the 2,021 metres (6,631 ft) Punta all'Altore. It flows in a generally west of southwest direction to its confluence with the Liamone. In its upper section it flows past the villages of Chiusa, Pastricciola, Rezza and Azzana, and is followed by the D104 or D4 road on its right (north) bank. Lower down it is followed by the D125 road and passes the village of Lopigna on its left (south) bank.

== Legend ==
There is a legend that three brothers, Liamone, Golo and Tavignano, suffered from the cold in the mountains of the central chain of Corsica. One day they swore to warm themselves by throwing themselves into the sea. Golo and Tavignano reached the sea quickly. Liamone, slowed by the granite rocks, struggled. The Devil came to his rescue when he swore to give him a soul each year. Every year the Liamone or one of its tributaries, the Catena, the Fiume Grosso or the Cruzini, paid this tribute. The legend explains the capricious flow of this river and its tributaries, sometimes slow but often impetuous.

== Valley ==
The Cruzini, the upper Liamone and the Sorru in su flow through a region known as the "Deux Sorru" in the Liamone landscape. The region does not see many tourists, although the river has several good places for swimming. The high and steep valley walls and the omnipresent forest contribute to a sense of isolation. The population is elderly, with more than 10% over 75 years of age. As of 2018 one person in five lived below the poverty level and had difficulty accessing health care.

The valley is covered by a dense Maquis shrubland except in the immediate vicinity of the villages, which are surrounded by terraced gardens and a few olive or chestnut groves. The riparian zone holds alders and willows. The upper Cruzini valley is predominantly wooded with Laricio pine, and is encircled by peaks of the Monte d'Oro massif exceeding 2,000 metres (6,600 ft) in height, including Punta di Pinzi Corbini, Punta Muratellu and Punta Migliarello. There are no roads above Chiusa, but the municipalities have developed themed trails and stopover lodges in an effort to attract hikers.

In its upper reaches the crest that separates the valley of the Cruzini from that of the Fiume Grossu to the north has been designated a Zone naturelle d'intérêt écologique, faunistique et floristique (ZNIEFF). It ranges in elevation from 600 to 2,425 metres (1,969 to 7,956 ft) and covers 5,132 hectares (12,680 acres). The Punta Muzzella is the highest peak. The area is used for extensive livestock farming, which maintains open areas and contributes to biodiversity. There is logging activity in the territorial forest of Libiu and the communal forest of Pastricciola.

== Tributaries ==
The following streams (ruisseaux) are tributaries of the Cruzini (ordered by length) and sub-tributaries:

- Viglianese: 6 km (3.7 mi)
  - Scarpentate: 3 km (1.9 mi)
- Tavola: 5 km (3.1 mi)
  - Ponticchiu: 2 km (1.2 mi)
  - San Marginu: 1 km (0.62 mi)
- Lagniato: 5 km (3.1 mi)
- Mitili: 5 km (3.1 mi)
- Melu: 4 km (2.5 mi)
  - Crocce: 3 km (1.9 mi)
- Fonda: 4 km (2.5 mi)
  - Purcareccia: 2 km (1.2 mi)
- Chiavatone: 2 km (1.2 mi)
- Castagnetta: 4 km (2.5 mi)
- Tartavellu: 4 km (2.5 mi)
  - Fontanelle: 4 km (2.5 mi)
  - Cocciolu: 1 km (0.62 mi)
- Campotellu: 4 km (2.5 mi)
- Azzana: 4 km (2.5 mi)
- Capannella: 3 km (1.9 mi)
  - Casaroggia: 2 km (1.2 mi)
  - Umbutone: 1 km (0.62 mi)
- Carga: 3 km (1.9 mi)
- Umbriccia: 3 km (1.9 mi)
  - Canale: 1 km (0.62 mi)
- Tassu: 3 km (1.9 mi)
- Canale: 3 km (1.9 mi)
- Cava: 3 km (1.9 mi)
- Chiovone: 3 km (1.9 mi)
- Confortu: 3 km (1.9 mi)
- Erbaju: 3 km (1.9 mi)
- Cadetta: 2 km (1.2 mi)
- Niellone: 2 km (1.2 mi)
- Favale: 2 km (1.2 mi)
- Erbajolu: 2 km (1.2 mi)
- Pisale: 1 km (0.62 mi)

== Sources ==
- Corse du Sud : le difficile accès aux soins des habitants du Cruzzini (in French), France 3 Corse ViaStella, 18 October 2018
- "Cruzzini", Paradisu (in French)
- "Liamone – 3.15", Atlas des paysages de la Region Corse (PDF) (in French), Direction régionale de l’environnement, de l’aménagement et du logement Corse
- "Relation: Rivière u Cruzzini (8479178)", OpenStreetMap
- "Rivière u Cruzini", Sandre (in French)
- ZNIEFF 940004229 Forets de Libiu, Guagnu et Pastricciola et milieux rupestres de Guagnu (in French), Inventaire national du patrimoine naturel (INPN)
