= Liamone (river) =

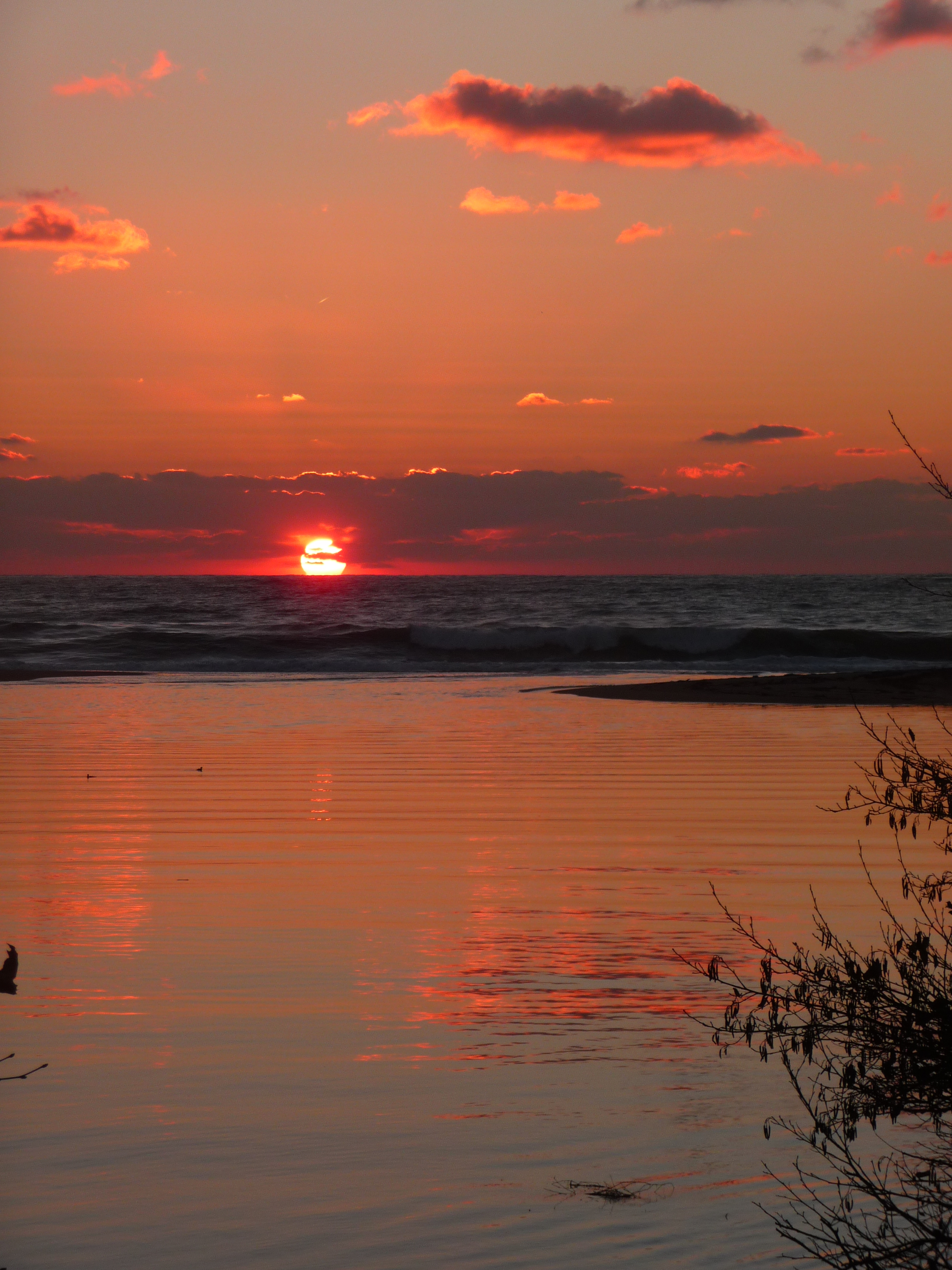
- The mouth of Liamone at sunset

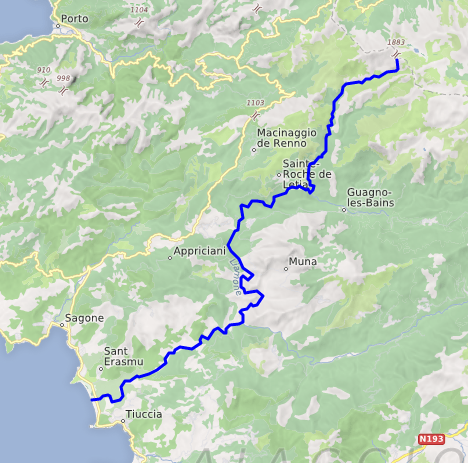
- Course of the Liamone

- Location within Corsica Location within France

Location
- Country: France
- Region: Corsica

Physical characteristics
- Source: Monte Cimatella
  - elevation: 1,850 m (6,070 ft)
- Mouth: Mediterranean Sea
  - coordinates: 42.078°N 8.7169°E
- Length: 40.6 km (25.2 mi)

The Liamone (French pronunciation: [ljamɔn]; Corsican: Liamonu; Latin: Circidius) river is a river of Corsica, France. The river gave its name to the former French department of Liamone. In antiquity, it bore the Latin name Circidius.

== Location ==
The length of its course is 40.6 kilometres (25.2 mi), entirely within the French department of Corse-du-Sud. It flows through ten communes: Letia, Murzo, Vico, Rosazia, Arbori, Lopigna, Arro, Ambiegna, Coggia and Casaglione. The Liamone has its source on the western slope of Monte Cimatella (2,099 meters (6,886 ft)), on the territory of the municipality of Letia, at an elevation of 1,850 meters (6,070 ft). In its upper course, it forms a waterfall (called Piscia) between elevations 546 meters (1,791 ft) and 514 meters (1,686 ft). After a course of 40.9 kilometres (25.4 mi), it flows into the Gulf of Sagone north of Ajaccio, between the two towns of Coggia and Casaglione.

== Valley ==
The Liamone gives its name to the Liamone landscape, an area of Corsica. It is the central watershed in this landscape, the others being the Sagone and Liscia rivers. These have created a large alluvial plain along the coast, and in the coastal plain the river makes wide meanders. There are no permanent settlements in the plain, which is unhealthy, apart from a few farms. The only villages are below the ridge that separates the Liamone from the Cinarca to the south. The RD81 road runs along the seaside between beaches and wet meadows.

Upstream the reliefs quickly become steep, with thick vegetation. The sea remains visible, although not the plain, until a high rock barrier below the Cruzinu tributary blocks the view. The east side of the Liamone gorges, where it is followed by the RD4, is almost completely uninhabited. The RD1 connecting Cinarca to Vico passes on the opposite side, less rugged and less wooded.

Above the gorges the topography is less rugged and the land is more inhabited, with many villages surrounded by groves of olives and chestnuts. Above the slopes are covered in pine forest, maquis or grassland. The villages once had a large population secure from the dangers of the coast, and almost self-sufficient economically. Today many of the inhabitants have left, but the fortified town of Vico with its tall houses and the Convent of Saint-François still preserve a strong architectural heritage.

== History ==
There is a legend that three brothers, Liamone, Golo and Tavignano, suffered from the cold in the mountains of the central chain of Corsica. One day they swore to warm themselves by throwing themselves into the sea. Golo and Tavignano reached the sea quickly. Liamone, slowed by the granite rocks, struggled. The Devil came to his rescue when he swore to give him a soul each year. Every year the Liamone or one of its tributaries, the Catena, the Fiume Grosso or the Cruzini, paid this tribute. The legend explains the capricious flow of this river and its tributaries, sometimes slow but often impetuous.

Pliny the Elder recorded the town of Charax (Ancient Greek: Χάραξ) as being to the West above the Liamone. This name is no longer in use, and it is possible that he recorded a fortification as a town.

== Hydrology ==
Measurements of the river flow were taken at the Pont de Truggia station in Arbori from 1969 to 2021. The watershed above this station covers 322 square kilometres (124 sq mi). The maximum daily flow was 454 cubic metres per second (16,000 cu ft/s) recorded on 3 November 2000. Average annual precipitation was calculated as 904 millimetres (35.6 in). The average flow of water throughout the year was 9.2 cubic metres per second (320 cu ft/s).

Average flow (cubic meters per second) by month for the period 1969 to 2021
Month	Flow
Jan	15.20
Feb	16.20
Mar	12.60
Apr	11.80
May	9.300
Jun	4.070
Jul	1.290
Aug	0.893
Sep	2.690
Oct	6.330
Nov	14.30
Dec	16.40

== Tributaries ==
The rivers Cruzzini (28 km) and Guagno (19 km) are tributaries of the Liamone. The following streams (ruisseaux) are also tributaries of the Liamone (ordered by length) and sub-tributaries:

- Catena: 7 km (4.3 mi)
  - Tuccarellu: 5 km (3.1 mi)
    - Mozzu: 2 km (1.2 mi)
  - Lancone: 3 km (1.9 mi)
    - Saliceu: 1 km (0.62 mi)
- Botaro: 7 km (4.3 mi)
  - Barbaraccio: 3 km (1.9 mi)
- Calzatoghiu: 6 km (3.7 mi)
- Chiusellu: 4 km (2.5 mi)
  - Finucchiaja: 2 km (1.2 mi)
- Forca: 4 km (2.5 mi)
- Cuvesine: 4 km (2.5 mi)
  - Pangatu: 2 km (1.2 mi)
  - Chiusellu: 1 km (0.62 mi)
    - Acqua Fredda: 1 km (0.62 mi)
- Elbica: 4 km (2.5 mi)
- Arbori: 4 km (2.5 mi)
  - Canali: 1 km (0.62 mi)
- Tigliu: 4 km (2.5 mi)
- Petraghiu: 3 km (1.9 mi)
- Frassetu: 3 km (1.9 mi)
  - Tevé: 2 km (1.2 mi)
- Alena: 3 km (1.9 mi)
- Trelica: 3 km (1.9 mi)
  - Biegna: 1 km (0.62 mi)
- Modignu: 3 km (1.9 mi)
- Arbillari: 2 km (1.2 mi)
- Forcioli: 2 km (1.2 mi)
- Mela: 2 km (1.2 mi)
- Corbari: 2 km (1.2 mi)
- Lavandacciu: 2 km (1.2 mi)
- Pantani: 1 km (0.62 mi)
- Meloni: 1 km (0.62 mi)
- Surbellu: 1 km (0.62 mi)
- Aculaghiu: 1 km (0.62 mi)
  - Fughicchie: 2 km (1.2 mi)

== Sources ==
- "Corsica". The Encyclopaedia Britannica. Vol. 7 (8th ed.). Edinburgh: Adams and Charles Black. 1854.
- "Fleuve u Liamone", Sandre (in French)
- "Géoportail". Géoportail (in French). IGN.
- Gregorovius, Ferdinand (1855), Corsica: Picturesque, Historical, and Social: With a Sketch of the Bonaparte, Paoli, Pozzo Di Borgo, and Other Principal Families, John E. Potter
- Hazlitt, William (1851), The Classical Gazetteer
- Le Liamone à Arbori [Pont de Truggia] (in French), Ministère de l'Ecologie, du Développement Durable et de l'Energie
- "Liamone – 3.15", Atlas des paysages de la Region Corse (PDF) (in French), Direction régionale de l’environnement, de l’aménagement et du logement Corse
