= Parc naturel régional de Corse =

Corsican natural park

Coordinates: 42.1354°N 9.07326°E

The Regional Natural Park of Corsica (French: Parc Naturel Régional de Corse, Corsican: Parcù di Corsica) is a natural park. It was listed in 1972 and then relisted for 10 years in June 1999. The Natural Park covers nearly 40% of the island of Corsica. A section the park centering on the Gulf of Porto was listed as a UNESCO World Heritage Site in 1983 because of its beauty, excellent representation of Corsican shrubland, and avian and marine diversity.

The aim of the natural park is to protect the rich flora and wildlife of the island. 145 communes are part of the program which supports the project and are grouped in 11 micro-regions, called:

1. Falasorma Marsulinu
2. Caccia Ghjunsani
3. Niolu
4. Castagniccia
5. Centru di Corsica
6. Fium'Orbu
7. Alta Rocca
8. Taravu Bastelica
9. Gravona
10. Cruzinu Dui Sorru
11. Deux-Sevi
