= Guagno =

Commune in Corsica, France

- Commune
- Location of Guagno
- Location within France Location within Corsica
- Coordinates: 42°10′10″N 8°56′57″E
- Country: France
- Region: Corsica
- Department: Corse-du-Sud
- Arrondissement: Ajaccio
- Canton: Sevi-Sorru-Cinarca

Government
  - Mayor (2020–2026): Paul-Joseph Colonna
- Area^{1}: 42.72 km^{2} (16.49 sq mi)
- Elevation: 800 m (2,600 ft)
- Highest elevation: 2,418 m (7,933 ft)
- Lowest elevation: 491 m (1,611 ft)
- Population (2023): 145
  - Density: 3.39/km^{2} (8.79/sq mi)
- Time zone: UTC+01:00 (CET)
  - Summer (DST): UTC+02:00 (CEST)
- INSEE/Postal code: 2A131 /20160
- ^{1} French Land Register data, which excludes lakes, ponds, glaciers > 1 km^{2} (0.386 sq mi or 247 acres) and river estuaries.

Guagno is a commune in the Corse-du-Sud department in France on the island of Corsica.

The river Guagno, also called the Fiume Grosso, flows through the commune from east to west. It is a tributary of the Liamone.

== Geography ==
The village lies at the foot of the Monte Rotondo massif, which rises to 2,622 metres, and on the upper course of the Guagno River, also known in its upper course as the Fiume Grosso. The Albelli, one of its tributaries, flows through the village. The commune is very mountainous, with high peaks dominating it to the east and especially to the north. Numerous springs rise within the commune, feeding mountain streams, some of which descend into the valleys as waterfalls.

== Population ==
Historical population
Year	Pop.	±% p.a.
1968	269	—
1975	253	−0.87%
1982	242	−0.63%
1990	145	−6.20%
1999	139	−0.47%
2007	154	+1.29%
2012	142	−1.61%
2017	165	+3.05%
2023	145	−2.13%
Source: INSEE

== See also ==
- Communes of the Corse-du-Sud department
