= Balogna =

Commune in Corsica, France

- Commune
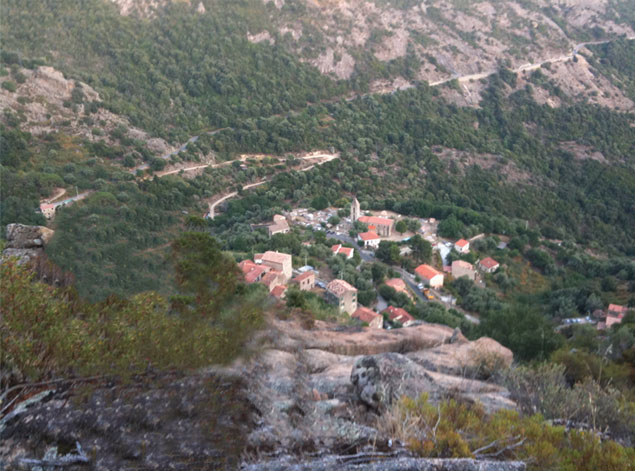
- A view of the village from the nearby hillside
- Location of Balogna
- Location within France Location within Corsica
- Coordinates: 42°10′44″N 8°46′47″E
- Country: France
- Region: Corsica
- Department: Corse-du-Sud
- Arrondissement: Ajaccio
- Canton: Sevi-Sorru-Cinarca

Government
  - Mayor (2020–2026): Dominique Claude Grisoni
- Area^{1}: 27.75 km^{2} (10.71 sq mi)
- Elevation: 420 m (1,380 ft)
- Highest elevation: 1,174 m (3,852 ft)
- Lowest elevation: 108 m (354 ft)
- Population (2023): 135
  - Density: 4.86/km^{2} (12.6/sq mi)
- Time zone: UTC+01:00 (CET)
  - Summer (DST): UTC+02:00 (CEST)
- INSEE/Postal code: 2A028 /20160
- ^{1} French Land Register data, which excludes lakes, ponds, glaciers > 1 km^{2} (0.386 sq mi or 247 acres) and river estuaries.

Balogna (French pronunciation: [balɔɲa], Italian: [baˈloɲɲa], Corsican: [baˈloɲa]) is a commune in the French department of Corse-du-Sud, on the island of Corsica.

== Geography ==
Somewhat isolated in a valley, the village is at an altitude of about 500 metres (1,600 ft) above sea level. It is the only Due Sorru that faces the sea, since the rest of the region lies beyond Col Saint Antoine and thus faces inland.

Two others valleys, now uninhabited, form with the first a territory that varies in elevation from just above sea level to almost 700 metres (2,300 ft) above it. The village, then, is situated in both mountainous and seaside areas.

Precariously perched, the village is in constant danger of rockslides from the nearby granite cliffs, although rockslides have yet to cause any serious damage.

== History ==
The village was established relatively recently, under the Genoan rule. One hypothesis holds that it was originally a place to exile people from Balagne (hence the name) who resisted Genoan rule, which would explain a lot.

No old artifacts exist in Balogna even though there are many in the surrounding area. On the other hand, there is a prehistoric site at Tragonatu.

== Administration ==
Politics in Balogna are similar to those in the rest of Corsica—rather than contests between the left and the right, elections are between nationalists, Catholics, and secularists.

The Due Sorru region is nonetheless considered rightist, more due to its postcolonial history than anything else.

In 2006, Balogna was the only place in Corsica that had a nationalist majority.

Recently, the narrow road leading to the village has been widened, and three supporting walls, one made of granite, have been constructed, and one of the two lavoirs was restored.

== Population ==
Historical population
Year	Pop.	±% p.a.
1968	204	—
1975	196	−0.57%
1982	176	−1.53%
1990	160	−1.18%
1999	170	+0.68%
2007	133	−3.02%
2012	130	−0.46%
2017	137	+1.05%
2023	135	−0.24%
Source: INSEE

== Sights ==
The village is spread out and divided into several quarters—at the entrance, around the church, the "Corte", whose atmosphere reminds one of certain villages of the Venetian Lagoon or in certain rural parts of Tuscany. The long circular route that give its shape to the village makes a sharp turn to cross U Canale, a place whose name might come from an old canal or from one of the old families that lives there, if not both. Then the road turns towards the location of the first houses built under Genoan rule, which stand protected at the bottom of the valley, "A Cardiccia". There are also more specific quarters like Guazzina, named after the fountain located there.

Finally, three uninhabited valleys behind the village that were once in use (chestnuts, olives, kilns) make up the rest of the territory of the commune. Now this area is used for hunting, hiking, and swims in streams or in the river Sagone. Two bridges, one recent, one dating back to the nineteenth century, apparently the result of first attempt at a Genoan bridge, show the lasting efforts of conquest and control of the territory. Until 1930, there was an important mule road, which explains why the Balogna families are so close to those of Marignana even though the routes between two such formerly close villages are now so indirect.

The main visible monument, Balogna's church is typical of a Toscan country style—one can also see the same style in the Tuscan Apennines, on the other side of the sea. The bell tower was built after the church itself. The only flat part of the village, the parvis, above the cemetery, is a place of rest and joy. The church is dedicated to the village's patron saint, Santu Quilicus, after whom it is named. Santu Quilicus translates to Saint Cyr, but this name is never used. Santu Quilicus' day is also the village's holiday, and it is celebrated with a parade and with games and feasting July 14 and 15.

At the base of the commune, there is a hot spring, but it is located on private land and not accessible to the public.

Two buildings bear witness to past activity.

The old inn, which could have housed about thirty people, has been turned into a barn. Since then, one has to imagine the wooden partitions, dormitories, bedrooms, common meals and games at night to relieve the boredom of the patients.

Nearby, there are two springs with mythic virtues—one hot and sulphureous, the other cold but also sulphureous. The first was famous for having "bleached" psoriasis, and the second was good for the eyes. There was one bath for men and one for women, as found elsewhere in Corsica. Only one remains.

In the 1970s, European investors supported the construction of a golf course attached to a thermal station, but now only the olive trees, clementine trees, and feral animals give the place its charm.

== Personalities ==
The bandit Mathieu Poli (not to be confused with Théodore Poli), wrongfully condemned to a work camp in Cayenne for a murder he did not commit, was a model prisoner up until he was able to return and straighten things out. His biography is currently being written.

== See also ==
- Communes of the Corse-du-Sud department
