= Cannelle =

Commune in Corsica, France

- Commune
- Location of Cannelle
- Location within France Location within Corsica
- Coordinates: 42°03′01″N 8°49′16″E
- Country: France
- Region: Corsica
- Department: Corse-du-Sud
- Arrondissement: Ajaccio
- Canton: Sevi-Sorru-Cinarca

Government
  - Mayor (2020–2026): François Joseph Paravisini
- Area^{1}: 3.41 km^{2} (1.32 sq mi)
- Elevation: 410 m (1,350 ft)
- Highest elevation: 832 m (2,730 ft)
- Lowest elevation: 56 m (184 ft)
- Population (2023): 70
  - Density: 21/km^{2} (53/sq mi)
- Time zone: UTC+01:00 (CET)
  - Summer (DST): UTC+02:00 (CEST)
- INSEE/Postal code: 2A060 /20151
- ^{1} French Land Register data, which excludes lakes, ponds, glaciers > 1 km^{2} (0.386 sq mi or 247 acres) and river estuaries.

Cannelle is a commune in the Corse-du-Sud department of France on the island of Corsica.

== Population ==
Historical population
Year	Pop.	±% p.a.
1968	53	—
1975	38	−4.64%
1982	21	−8.12%
1990	25	+2.20%
1999	32	+2.78%
2007	46	+4.64%
2012	50	+1.68%
2017	65	+5.39%
2023	70	+1.24%
Source: INSEE

== See also ==
- Communes of the Corse-du-Sud department
