= Renno =

Commune in Corsica, France

- Commune
- Location of Renno
- Location within France Location within Corsica
- Coordinates: 42°12′41″N 8°49′38″E
- Country: France
- Region: Corsica
- Department: Corse-du-Sud
- Arrondissement: Ajaccio
- Canton: Sevi-Sorru-Cinarca

Government
  - Mayor (2021–2026): Xavier Luciani
- Area^{1}: 12.62 km^{2} (4.87 sq mi)
- Elevation: 900 m (3,000 ft)
- Highest elevation: 1,507 m (4,944 ft)
- Lowest elevation: 717 m (2,352 ft)
- Population (2023): 62
  - Density: 4.9/km^{2} (13/sq mi)
- Time zone: UTC+01:00 (CET)
  - Summer (DST): UTC+02:00 (CEST)
- INSEE/Postal code: 2A258 /20160
- ^{1} French Land Register data, which excludes lakes, ponds, glaciers > 1 km^{2} (0.386 sq mi or 247 acres) and river estuaries.

Renno is a commune in the Corse-du-Sud department of France on the island of Corsica.

== Geography ==
=== Climate ===
Renno has a warm-summer mediterranean climate (Köppen climate classification Csb). The average annual temperature in Renno is 11.8 °C (53.2 °F). The average annual rainfall is 1,181.2 mm (46.50 in) with November as the wettest month. The temperatures are highest on average in August, at around 20.1 °C (68.2 °F), and lowest in January, at around 4.9 °C (40.8 °F). The highest temperature ever recorded in Renno was 38.3 °C (100.9 °F) on 19 July 2023 and 1 August 2017; the coldest temperature ever recorded was −9.4 °C (15.1 °F) on 11 February 2012.

Climate data for Renno (1991−2020 normals, extremes 1993−present)
Month	Jan	Feb	Mar	Apr	May	Jun	Jul	Aug	Sep	Oct	Nov	Dec	Year
Record high °C (°F)	17.7 (63.9)	21.3 (70.3)	26.7 (80.1)	27.9 (82.2)	31.0 (87.8)	34.2 (93.6)	38.3 (100.9)	37.2 (99.0)	33.4 (92.1)	28.9 (84.0)	23.0 (73.4)	19.3 (66.7)	37.2 (99.0)
Mean daily maximum °C (°F)	9.2 (48.6)	9.6 (49.3)	12.2 (54.0)	14.8 (58.6)	18.8 (65.8)	23.3 (73.9)	26.4 (79.5)	26.8 (80.2)	22.2 (72.0)	18.6 (65.5)	13.2 (55.8)	10.0 (50.0)	17.1 (62.8)
Daily mean °C (°F)	4.9 (40.8)	5.0 (41.0)	7.2 (45.0)	9.7 (49.5)	13.4 (56.1)	17.1 (62.8)	19.7 (67.5)	20.1 (68.2)	16.3 (61.3)	13.3 (55.9)	8.9 (48.0)	5.8 (42.4)	11.8 (53.2)
Mean daily minimum °C (°F)	0.7 (33.3)	0.4 (32.7)	2.2 (36.0)	4.6 (40.3)	8.0 (46.4)	11.0 (51.8)	12.9 (55.2)	13.3 (55.9)	10.5 (50.9)	7.9 (46.2)	4.5 (40.1)	1.7 (35.1)	6.5 (43.7)
Record low °C (°F)	−6.7 (19.9)	−9.4 (15.1)	−7.6 (18.3)	−4.2 (24.4)	−0.2 (31.6)	3.0 (37.4)	5.3 (41.5)	5.4 (41.7)	3.5 (38.3)	−0.5 (31.1)	−5.0 (23.0)	−6.9 (19.6)	−9.4 (15.1)
Average precipitation mm (inches)	122.2 (4.81)	103.3 (4.07)	100.3 (3.95)	106.0 (4.17)	88.8 (3.50)	41.8 (1.65)	22.2 (0.87)	34.4 (1.35)	93.3 (3.67)	124.2 (4.89)	190.8 (7.51)	153.9 (6.06)	1,181.2 (46.50)
Average precipitation days (≥ 1.0 mm)	9.9	9.2	8.4	9.7	7.8	4.3	2.2	3.3	7.1	9.0	12.0	11.4	94.2
Source: Météo France

== Population ==
Historical population
Year	Pop.	±% p.a.
1968	196	—
1975	152	−3.57%
1982	108	−4.76%
1990	84	−3.09%
1999	77	−0.96%
2007	84	+1.09%
2012	59	−6.82%
2017	59	+0.00%
2023	62	+0.83%
Source: INSEE

== See also ==
- Communes of the Corse-du-Sud department
