= Poggiolo, Corse-du-Sud =

Commune in Corsica, France

Poggiolo
- Commune
- Location of Poggiolo
- Location within France Location within Corsica
- Coordinates: 42°10′40″N 8°54′37″E
- Country: France
- Region: Corsica
- Department: Corse-du-Sud
- Arrondissement: Ajaccio
- Canton: Sevi-Sorru-Cinarca

Government
  - Mayor (2020–2026): Jean-Laurent Pinelli
- Area^{1}: 12.15 km^{2} (4.69 sq mi)
- Elevation: 550 m (1,800 ft)
- Highest elevation: 1,622 m (5,322 ft)
- Lowest elevation: 404 m (1,325 ft)
- Population (2023): 104
  - Density: 8.56/km^{2} (22.2/sq mi)
- Time zone: UTC+01:00 (CET)
  - Summer (DST): UTC+02:00 (CEST)
- INSEE/Postal code: 2A240 /20125
- ^{1} French Land Register data, which excludes lakes, ponds, glaciers > 1 km^{2} (0.386 sq mi or 247 acres) and river estuaries.

Poggiolo is a commune in the Corse-du-Sud department of France on the island of Corsica.

== Population ==
Historical population
Year	Pop.	±% p.a.
1968	120	—
1975	117	−0.36%
1982	93	−3.23%
1990	76	−2.49%
1999	95	+2.51%
2007	91	−0.54%
2012	100	+1.90%
2017	111	+2.11%
2023	104	−1.08%
Source: INSEE

== See also ==
- Communes of the Corse-du-Sud department
