= Église Saint-Jean de Cinarca =

Church in Corse-du-Sud, France

Coordinates: 42°03′31″N 8°49′23″E

Église Saint-Jean de Cinarca is a ruined church in Sari-d'Orcino, Corse-du-Sud, western Corsica. The building was classified as a Historic Monument in 1976.
