= Cristinacce =

Commune in Corsica, France

- Commune
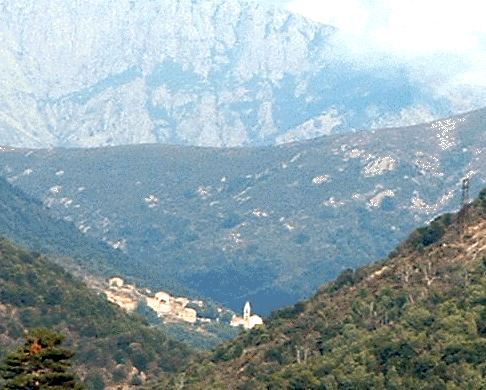
- A view of the village on the road to Porto
- Location of Cristinacce
- Location within France Location within Corsica
- Coordinates: 42°14′24″N 8°50′28″E
- Country: France
- Region: Corsica
- Department: Corse-du-Sud
- Arrondissement: Ajaccio
- Canton: Sevi-Sorru-Cinarca

Government
  - Mayor (2020–2026): Antoine Versini
- Area^{1}: 20.45 km^{2} (7.90 sq mi)
- Elevation: 835 m (2,740 ft)
- Highest elevation: 1,767 m (5,797 ft)
- Lowest elevation: 630 m (2,070 ft)
- Population (2023): 77
  - Density: 3.8/km^{2} (9.8/sq mi)
- Time zone: UTC+01:00 (CET)
  - Summer (DST): UTC+02:00 (CEST)
- INSEE/Postal code: 2A100 /20126
- ^{1} French Land Register data, which excludes lakes, ponds, glaciers > 1 km^{2} (0.386 sq mi or 247 acres) and river estuaries.

Cristinacce is a commune in the Corse-du-Sud department of France on the island of Corsica.

== Geography ==
The village of Cristinacce is constructed on a rocky knoll at an altitude of 830m at the foot of the Col de Sevi (1100m), 70 km north of Ajaccio and 35 km from Sagone. It is dominated to the north by the Capu di Melo (1562m) and to the east by the range of Tritore, culminating at more than 2000m. The village numbers about 50 dwellings, the majority of which are only occupied during the summer.

The village is surrounded by chestnut trees that along with the pigs, cattle and gardens have supported the essential economy of the region up to the present day. Tourism, pork butchery, sale of honey, preserves and chestnut flour are the main activities of the region which has benefitted from its inheritance and tourism.

The water wells of the village are very pure and numerous. One of these feeds the public fountain and is reputed to possess thermal values similar to Volvo water.

Many random walks from half to five days can be made around Cristinacce by a couple or a family.

Many artists have lived and still live in the village. The paintings of one of them, Francoise Leca-Parodi are periodically exhibited in the town hall of Cristinacce.

== History ==
By popular tradition, handed down from fathers to sons, it is said that Cristinacce was created in the Middle Ages by the three Versini brothers, shepherds from Niolo. They finally quarrelled and two of them killed the third one. The latter had many descendants and consequently, the majority of the inhabitants of Cristinacce are Versinis or their descendants (since 1830, 19 mayors of the village out of 20 were Versinis.

Up to the 15th century, the “Cristinacces” were composed of seven hamlets, burnt down by the Genoese in 1460 as a reprisal for a revolt instigated by Giovani Paolo da Leca, a minor local lord. The village was probably rebuilt about 1480 on the same site, as seems to be indicated by a document of 1485 on the reorganisation of the region after several years of troubles.

In the 16th century, the invasion of the Barbarians again decimated the population. In 1550, during one of these invasions, the neighbouring village of Évisa was pillaged and 80 men seized and taken away as slaves. One of them, a certain Versini of Cristinacce, miraculously returned to the village after several years in exile. His descendants have kept the memory of his past.

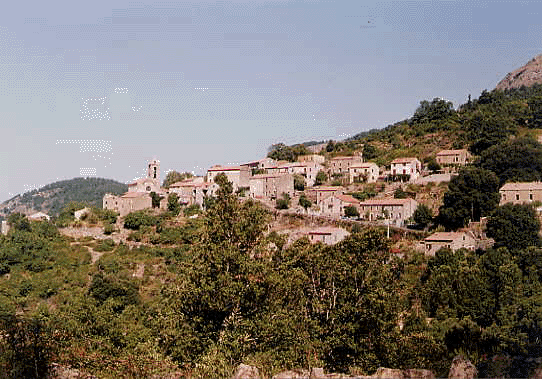

== Population ==
Historical population
Year	Pop.	±% p.a.
1968	96	—
1975	88	−1.24%
1982	60	−5.32%
1990	49	−2.50%
1999	52	+0.66%
2007	60	+1.80%
2012	57	−1.02%
2017	63	+2.02%
2023	77	+3.40%
Source: INSEE

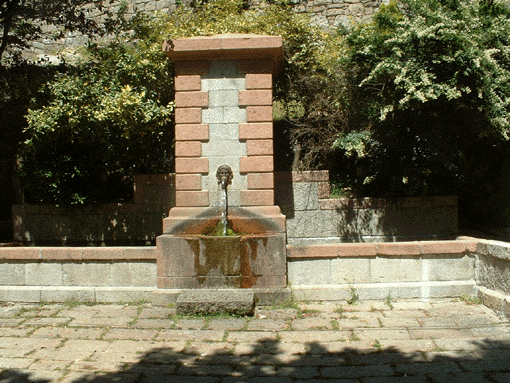

== Administration ==
List of the mayors of the village of Cristinacce:

- 1830-1832 Givan Battisto Versini
- 1833-1839 Simeone Versini
- 1842-1849 Givan Battisto Versini
- 1849-1852 Ambroise Versini
- 1852-1860 Joseph-Antoine Versini
- 1860-1870 Simeone Versini
- 1870-1877 Jean-François Séraphin Versini
- 1878-1891 Dominique Versini
- 1892-1896 Simeon Arrihi
- 1897-1899 Dominique François Versini
- 1900-1904 Dominique François Versini
- 1904-1909 Martin Versini
- 1910-1911 Dominique Padovani
- 1911-1912 Jean Versini
- 1913-1920 Xavier Versini
- 1920-1925 Bernardin Versini
- 1925-1943 Dominique Antoine Versini
- 1943-1945 Dominique Marie Versini
- 1945-1959 Pierre Marie Versini
- 1959-1970 Jean Baptiste Versini
- 1971-1976 Dominique Antoine Camilli
- 1977-1982 Jean-Pierre Filippini
- 1983-2008 Jean-Baptiste Nesa
- 2008-2013 Antoine Versini

Since 1830, 24 mayors have been appointed, and 19 of these had the same family name as the three founder brothers of the village in the Middle Ages.

== Sights ==
Cristinacce church, building started in 1860, bell tower finished in 1901.

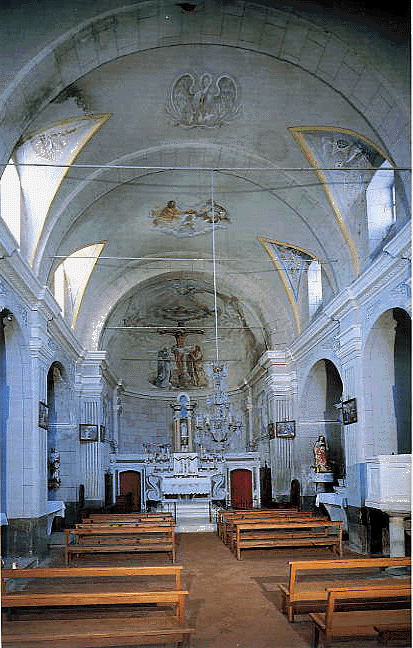
Inside Cristinacce church

== See also ==
- Communes of the Corse-du-Sud department
