= Soccia =

Commune in Corsica, France

Soccia A Soccia
- Commune
- Location of Soccia
- Location within France Location within Corsica
- Coordinates: 42°11′26″N 8°54′42″E
- Country: France
- Region: Corsica
- Department: Corse-du-Sud
- Arrondissement: Ajaccio
- Canton: Sevi-Sorru-Cinarca

Government
  - Mayor (2020–2026): Jean-François Bartoli
- Area^{1}: 28.27 km^{2} (10.92 sq mi)
- Elevation: 650 m (2,130 ft)
- Highest elevation: 2,100 m (6,900 ft)
- Lowest elevation: 409 m (1,342 ft)
- Population (2023): 160
  - Density: 5.7/km^{2} (15/sq mi)
- Time zone: UTC+01:00 (CET)
  - Summer (DST): UTC+02:00 (CEST)
- INSEE/Postal code: 2A282 /20125
- ^{1} French Land Register data, which excludes lakes, ponds, glaciers > 1 km^{2} (0.386 sq mi or 247 acres) and river estuaries.

Soccia is a commune in the Corse-du-Sud department of France on the island of Corsica.

== Population ==
Historical population
Year	Pop.	±% p.a.
1968	284	—
1975	222	−3.46%
1982	172	−3.58%
1990	143	−2.28%
1999	121	−1.84%
2007	142	+2.02%
2012	154	+1.64%
2017	146	−1.06%
2023	160	+1.54%
Source: INSEE

== See also ==
- Communes of the Corse-du-Sud department
