= Sant'Andréa-d'Orcino =

Commune in Corsica, France

- Commune
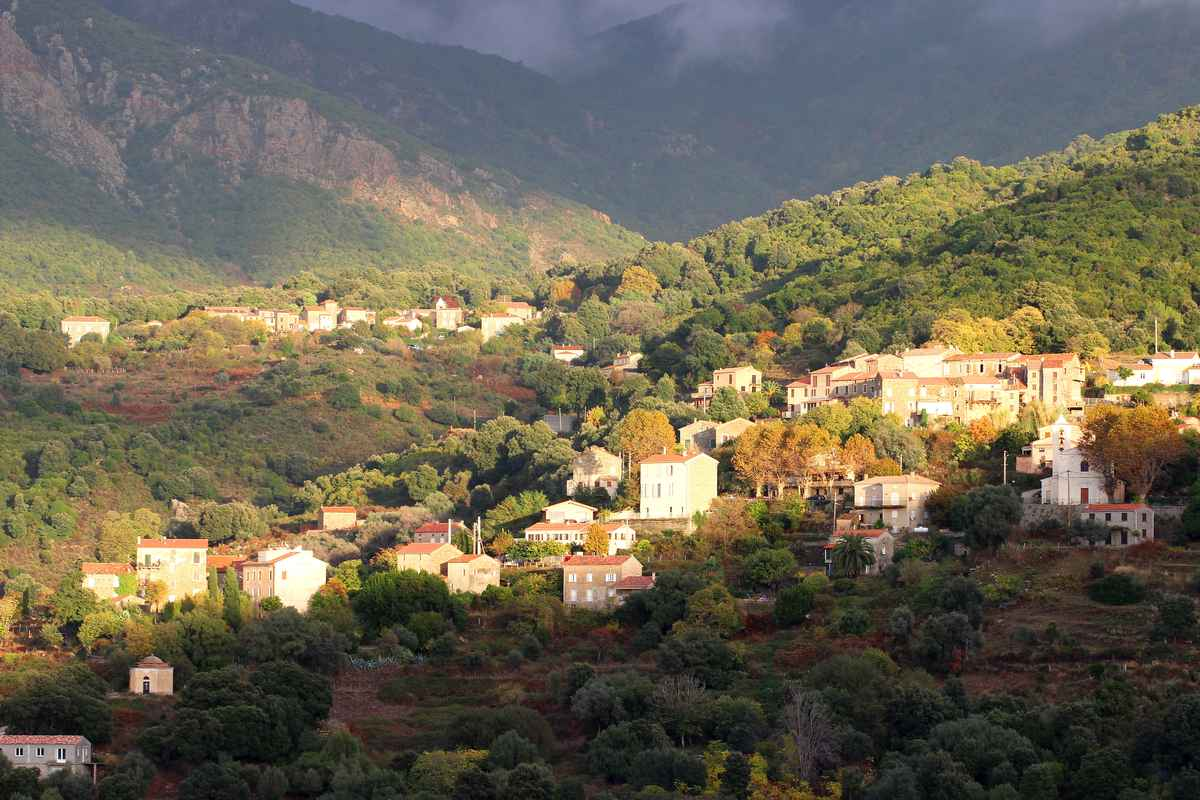
- A general view of the village of Sant'Andréa d'Orcino
- Location of Sant'Andréa-d'Orcino
- Location within France Location within Corsica
- Coordinates: 42°02′50″N 8°48′34″E
- Country: France
- Region: Corsica
- Department: Corse-du-Sud
- Arrondissement: Ajaccio
- Canton: Sevi-Sorru-Cinarca

Government
  - Mayor (2020–2026): Réjane Leca
- Area^{1}: 8.75 km^{2} (3.38 sq mi)
- Elevation: 340 m (1,120 ft)
- Highest elevation: 827 m (2,713 ft)
- Lowest elevation: 0 m (0 ft)
- Population (2023): 144
  - Density: 16.5/km^{2} (42.6/sq mi)
- Time zone: UTC+01:00 (CET)
  - Summer (DST): UTC+02:00 (CEST)
- INSEE/Postal code: 2A295 /20151
- ^{1} French Land Register data, which excludes lakes, ponds, glaciers > 1 km^{2} (0.386 sq mi or 247 acres) and river estuaries.

Sant'Andréa-d'Orcino is a commune in the Corse-du-Sud department of France on the island of Corsica.

== Population ==
Historical population
| Year | Pop. | ±% p.a. |
|---|---|---|
| 1968 | 103 | — |
| 1975 | 86 | −2.54% |
| 1982 | 76 | −1.75% |
| 1990 | 69 | −1.20% |
| 1999 | 71 | +0.32% |
| 2007 | 76 | +0.85% |
| 2012 | 75 | −0.26% |
| 2017 | 110 | +7.96% |
| 2023 | 144 | +4.59% |
Source: INSEE

== See also ==
- Communes of the Corse-du-Sud department
