= Orto, Corse-du-Sud =

Commune in Corsica, France

Orto
- Commune
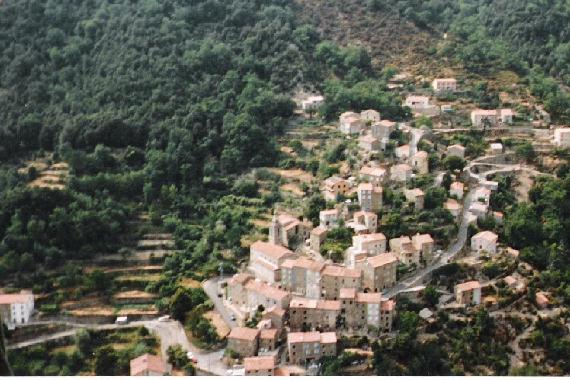
- An overhead view of the village
- Location of Orto
- Location within France Location within Corsica
- Coordinates: 42°11′15″N 8°55′59″E
- Country: France
- Region: Corsica
- Department: Corse-du-Sud
- Arrondissement: Ajaccio
- Canton: Sevi-Sorru-Cinarca

Government
  - Mayor (2020–2026): Nicolas Rutily
- Area^{1}: 16.21 km^{2} (6.26 sq mi)
- Elevation: 650 m (2,130 ft)
- Highest elevation: 2,280 m (7,480 ft)
- Lowest elevation: 492 m (1,614 ft)
- Population (2023): 81
  - Density: 5.0/km^{2} (13/sq mi)
- Time zone: UTC+01:00 (CET)
  - Summer (DST): UTC+02:00 (CEST)
- INSEE/Postal code: 2A196 /20125
- ^{1} French Land Register data, which excludes lakes, ponds, glaciers > 1 km^{2} (0.386 sq mi or 247 acres) and river estuaries.

Orto (French pronunciation: [ɔʁto]; Corsican: Ortu) is a commune in the Corse-du-Sud department of France on the island of Corsica.

== Population ==
Historical population
Year	Pop.	±% p.a.
1968	122	—
1975	104	−2.25%
1982	89	−2.20%
1990	44	−8.43%
1999	54	+2.30%
2007	55	+0.23%
2012	58	+1.07%
2017	55	−1.06%
2023	81	+6.66%
Source: INSEE

== See also ==
- Communes of the Corse-du-Sud department
