= Pastricciola =

Commune in Corsica, France

- Commune
- Location of Pastricciola
- Location within France Location within Corsica
- Coordinates: 42°08′27″N 8°59′05″E
- Country: France
- Region: Corsica
- Department: Corse-du-Sud
- Arrondissement: Ajaccio
- Canton: Sevi-Sorru-Cinarca

Government
  - Mayor (2020–2026): Stéphane Leca
- Area^{1}: 46.32 km^{2} (17.88 sq mi)
- Elevation: 600 m (2,000 ft)
- Highest elevation: 2,241 m (7,352 ft)
- Lowest elevation: 333 m (1,093 ft)
- Population (2023): 90
  - Density: 1.9/km^{2} (5.0/sq mi)
- Time zone: UTC+01:00 (CET)
  - Summer (DST): UTC+02:00 (CEST)
- INSEE/Postal code: 2A204 /20121
- ^{1} French Land Register data, which excludes lakes, ponds, glaciers > 1 km^{2} (0.386 sq mi or 247 acres) and river estuaries.

Pastricciola is a commune in the Corse-du-Sud department of France on the island of Corsica.

== Population ==
Historical population
Year	Pop.	±% p.a.
1968	249	—
1975	180	−4.53%
1982	115	−6.20%
1990	89	−3.15%
1999	81	−1.04%
2007	84	+0.46%
2012	97	+2.92%
2017	97	+0.00%
2023	90	−1.24%
Source: INSEE

== See also ==
- Communes of the Corse-du-Sud department
