= Murzo =

Commune in Corsica, France

- Commune
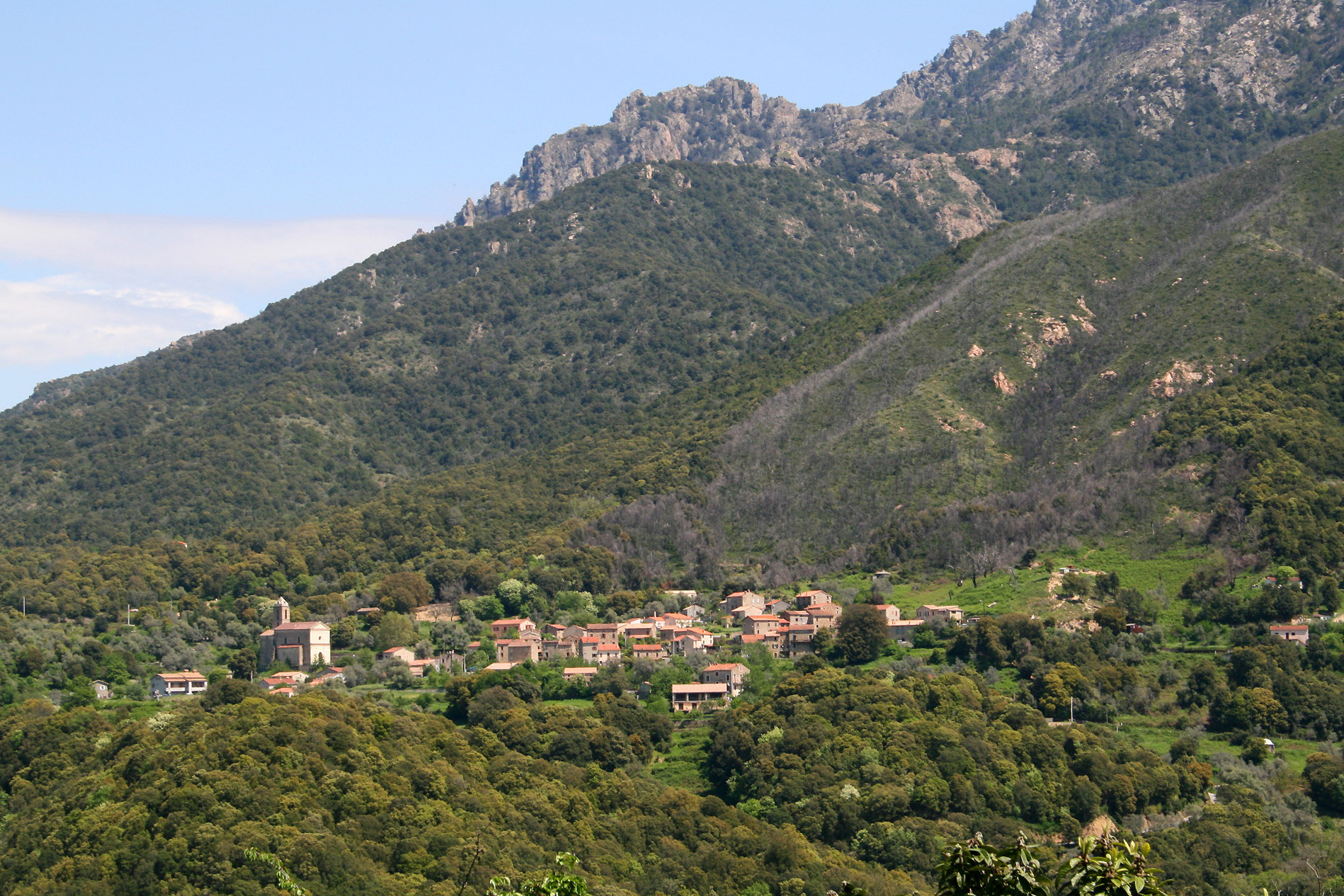
- A general view of the village of Murzo
- Location of Murzo
- Location within France Location within Corsica
- Coordinates: 42°10′08″N 8°49′40″E
- Country: France
- Region: Corsica
- Department: Corse-du-Sud
- Arrondissement: Ajaccio
- Canton: Sevi-Sorru-Cinarca

Government
  - Mayor (2022–2026): François Paoli
- Area^{1}: 21.44 km^{2} (8.28 sq mi)
- Elevation: 303 m (994 ft)
- Highest elevation: 1,406 m (4,613 ft)
- Lowest elevation: 117 m (384 ft)
- Population (2023): 98
  - Density: 4.6/km^{2} (12/sq mi)
- Time zone: UTC+01:00 (CET)
  - Summer (DST): UTC+02:00 (CEST)
- INSEE/Postal code: 2A174 /20160
- ^{1} French Land Register data, which excludes lakes, ponds, glaciers > 1 km^{2} (0.386 sq mi or 247 acres) and river estuaries.

Murzo is a commune in the Corse-du-Sud department of France on the island of Corsica.

== Population ==
Historical population
Year	Pop.	±% p.a.
1968	132	—
1975	117	−1.71%
1982	105	−1.53%
1990	81	−3.19%
1999	77	−0.56%
2007	97	+2.93%
2012	81	−3.54%
2017	97	+3.67%
2023	98	+0.17%
Source: INSEE

== See also ==
- Communes of the Corse-du-Sud department
