= Coggia =

Commune in Corsica, France

- Commune
- Location of Coggia
- Location within France Location within Corsica
- Coordinates: 42°07′27″N 8°44′58″E
- Country: France
- Region: Corsica
- Department: Corse-du-Sud
- Arrondissement: Ajaccio
- Canton: Sevi-Sorru-Cinarca

Government
  - Mayor (2020–2026): François Coggia
- Area^{1}: 31.33 km^{2} (12.10 sq mi)
- Elevation: 400 m (1,300 ft)
- Highest elevation: 917 m (3,009 ft)
- Lowest elevation: 0 m (0 ft)
- Population (2023): 818
  - Density: 26.1/km^{2} (67.6/sq mi)
- Time zone: UTC+01:00 (CET)
  - Summer (DST): UTC+02:00 (CEST)
- INSEE/Postal code: 2A090 /20160
- ^{1} French Land Register data, which excludes lakes, ponds, glaciers > 1 km^{2} (0.386 sq mi or 247 acres) and river estuaries.

Coggia (French pronunciation: [kɔdʒa]; Corsican: Coghja [ˈkoɟa]) is a commune in the Corse-du-Sud department of France on the island of Corsica.

== History ==
On 17 January 2010, bombs went off at two residences in Coggia, the entry "sdate G. Leclair FLNC piu che mai" was found in at least one of the sites.

== Population ==
Historical population
| Year | Pop. | ±% p.a. |
|---|---|---|
| 1968 | 225 | — |
| 1975 | 284 | +3.38% |
| 1982 | 447 | +6.69% |
| 1990 | 538 | +2.34% |
| 1999 | 699 | +2.95% |
| 2007 | 852 | +2.51% |
| 2012 | 827 | −0.59% |
| 2017 | 695 | −3.42% |
| 2023 | 818 | +2.75% |
Source: INSEE

== See also ==
- Communes of the Corse-du-Sud department
- Tour de Corse.
