= Serriera =

Commune in Corsica, France

- Commune
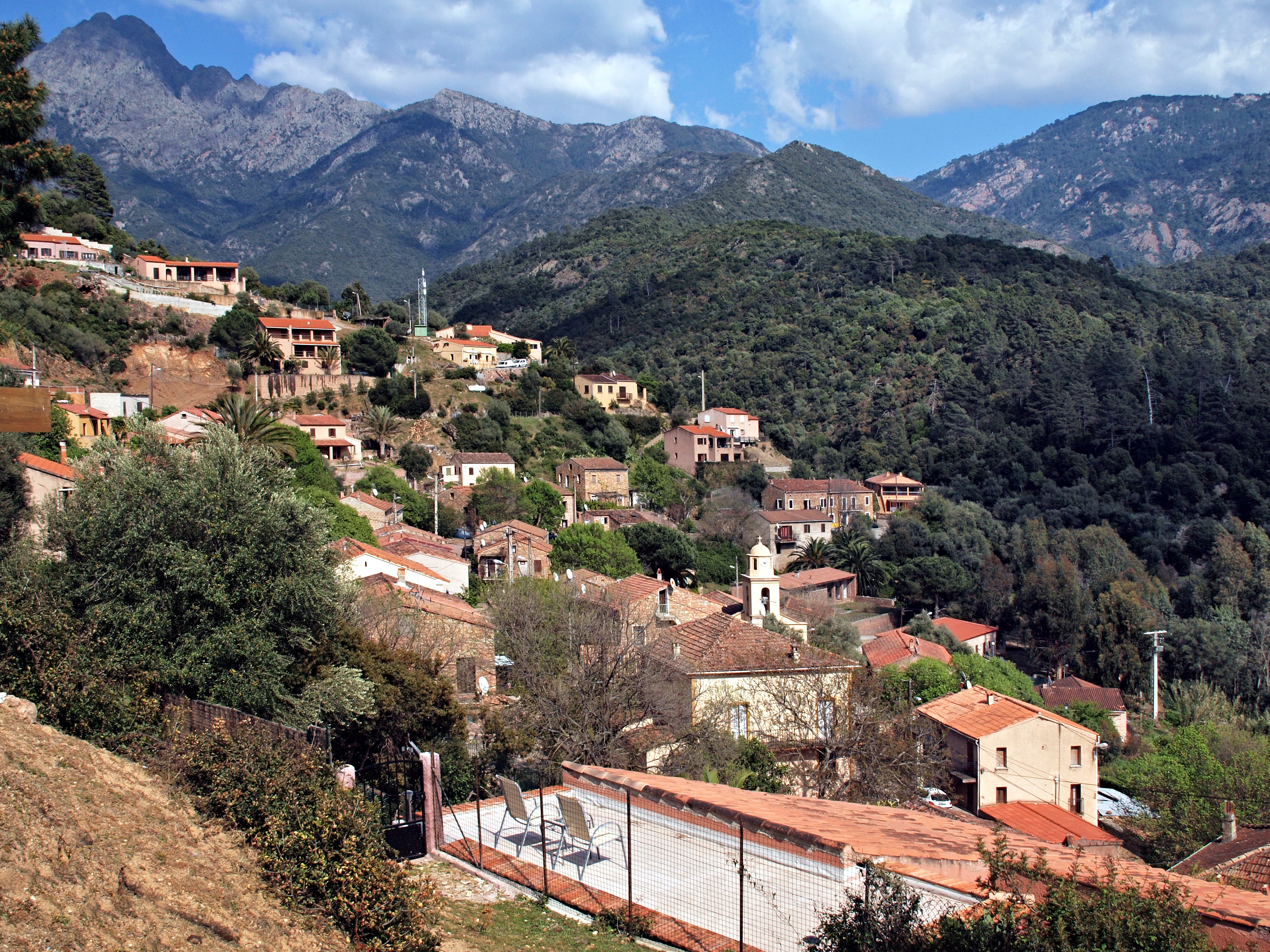
- A view of the village of Serriera
- Location of Serriera
- Location within France Location within Corsica
- Coordinates: 42°18′09″N 8°42′32″E
- Country: France
- Region: Corsica
- Department: Corse-du-Sud
- Arrondissement: Ajaccio
- Canton: Sevi-Sorru-Cinarca

Government
  - Mayor (2020–2026): Barthélémy Leca
- Area^{1}: 37 km^{2} (14 sq mi)
- Elevation: 80 m (260 ft)
- Highest elevation: 1,618 m (5,308 ft)
- Lowest elevation: 0 m (0 ft)
- Population (2023): 113
  - Density: 3.1/km^{2} (7.9/sq mi)
- Time zone: UTC+01:00 (CET)
  - Summer (DST): UTC+02:00 (CEST)
- INSEE/Postal code: 2A279 /20147
- ^{1} French Land Register data, which excludes lakes, ponds, glaciers > 1 km^{2} (0.386 sq mi or 247 acres) and river estuaries.

Serriera (French pronunciation: [sɛʁjɛʁa]; Corsican: A Sarrera) is a commune in the Corse-du-Sud department of France on the island of Corsica.

== Population ==
Historical population
Year	Pop.	±% p.a.
1968	136	—
1975	128	−0.86%
1982	111	−2.02%
1990	106	−0.57%
1999	106	+0.00%
2007	105	−0.12%
2012	119	+2.53%
2017	127	+1.31%
2023	113	−1.93%
Source: INSEE

== See also ==
- Communes of the Corse-du-Sud department
