= Evisa =

Scientific classification
- Domain: Eukaryota
- Kingdom: Animalia
- Phylum: Arthropoda
- Class: Insecta
- Order: Lepidoptera
- Superfamily: Noctuoidea
- Family: Noctuidae
- Genus: Evisa; Reisser, 1930

Genus of moths

Evisa is a genus of moths of the family Noctuidae.

== Species ==
- Evisa reisseri Wiltshire, 1952
- Evisa schawerdae Reisser, 1930
