= Partinello =

Commune in Corsica, France

- Commune
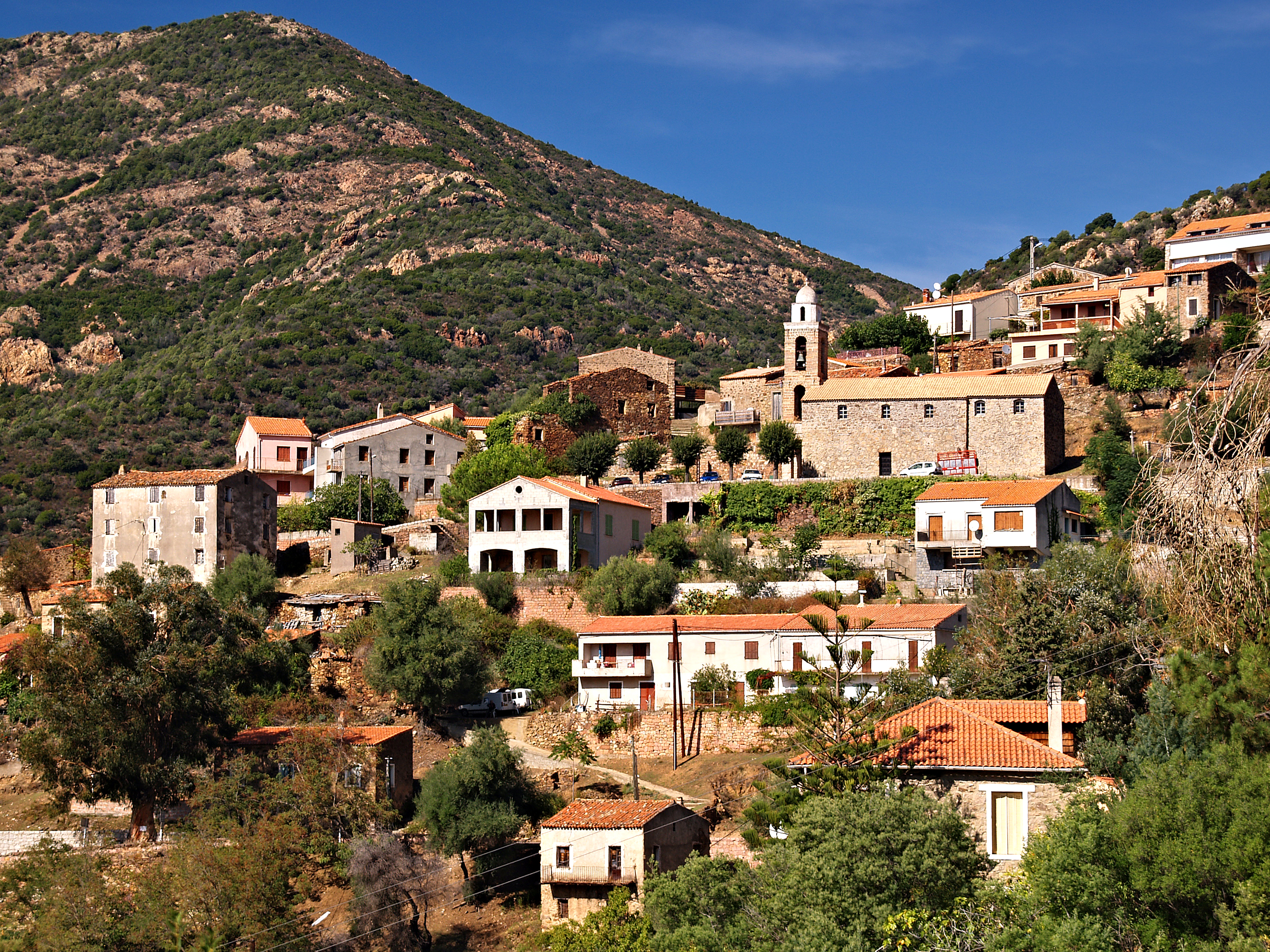
- A general view of the village of Partinello
- Location of Partinello
- Location within France Location within Corsica
- Coordinates: 42°18′46″N 8°40′59″E
- Country: France
- Region: Corsica
- Department: Corse-du-Sud
- Arrondissement: Ajaccio
- Canton: Sevi-Sorru-Cinarca

Government
  - Mayor (2020–2026): Christian Cardi
- Area^{1}: 18.66 km^{2} (7.20 sq mi)
- Elevation: 160 m (520 ft)
- Highest elevation: 1,000 m (3,300 ft)
- Lowest elevation: 0 m (0 ft)
- Population (2023): 94
  - Density: 5.0/km^{2} (13/sq mi)
- Time zone: UTC+01:00 (CET)
  - Summer (DST): UTC+02:00 (CEST)
- INSEE/Postal code: 2A203 /20147
- ^{1} French Land Register data, which excludes lakes, ponds, glaciers > 1 km^{2} (0.386 sq mi or 247 acres) and river estuaries.

Partinello (French pronunciation: [paʁtinɛlo]; Corsican: Partinellu) is a commune in the Corse-du-Sud department of France on the island of Corsica.

== Population ==
Historical population
Year	Pop.	±% p.a.
1968	111	—
1975	114	+0.38%
1982	127	+1.55%
1990	113	−1.45%
1999	89	−2.62%
2007	101	+1.59%
2012	103	+0.39%
2017	102	−0.19%
2023	94	−1.35%
Source: INSEE

== See also ==
- Communes of the Corse-du-Sud department
