= Sari-d'Orcino =

Commune in Corsica, France

- Commune
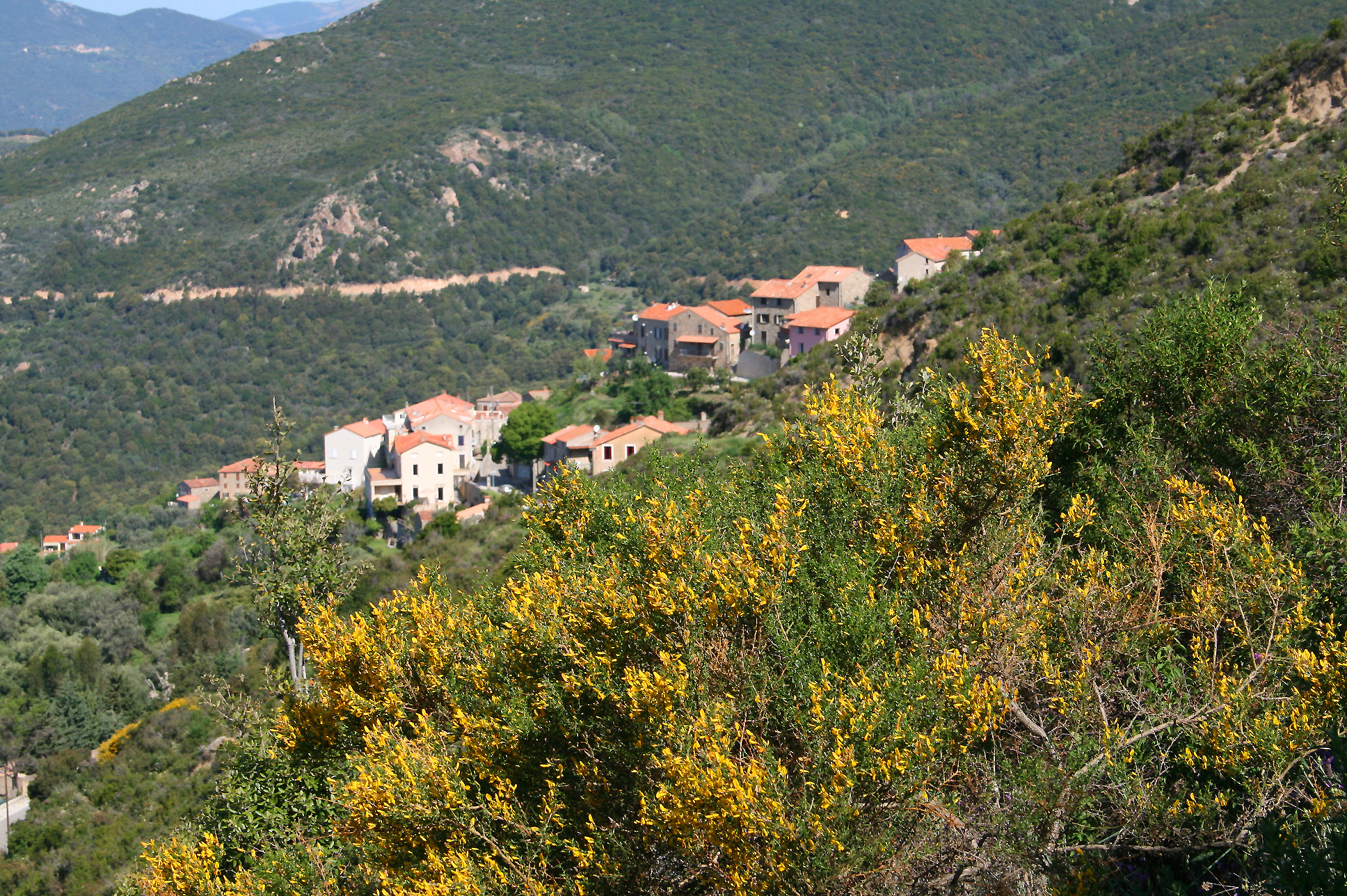
- A general view of the village
- Location of Sari-d'Orcino
- Location within France Location within Corsica
- Coordinates: 42°03′39″N 8°49′41″E
- Country: France
- Region: Corsica
- Department: Corse-du-Sud
- Arrondissement: Ajaccio
- Canton: Sevi-Sorru-Cinarca

Government
  - Mayor (2020–2026): Michel Pinelli
- Area^{1}: 22.09 km^{2} (8.53 sq mi)
- Elevation: 400 m (1,300 ft)
- Highest elevation: 1,245 m (4,085 ft)
- Lowest elevation: 95 m (312 ft)
- Population (2023): 351
  - Density: 15.9/km^{2} (41.2/sq mi)
- Time zone: UTC+01:00 (CET)
  - Summer (DST): UTC+02:00 (CEST)
- INSEE/Postal code: 2A270 /20151
- ^{1} French Land Register data, which excludes lakes, ponds, glaciers > 1 km^{2} (0.386 sq mi or 247 acres) and river estuaries.

Sari-d'Orcino (Italian: Sari d'Orcino, [saʁi dɔrtʃino]; Corsican: Sari d'Orcinu, Sari d'Urcinu, or Sari di Cinarca) is a commune in the Corse-du-Sud department of France on the island of Corsica.

== Population ==
Historical population
Year	Pop.	±% p.a.
1968	301	—
1975	282	−0.93%
1982	218	−3.61%
1990	236	+1.00%
1999	259	+1.04%
2007	305	+2.06%
2012	321	+1.03%
2017	329	+0.49%
2023	351	+1.08%
Source: INSEE

== Sights ==
- Église Saint-Jean de Cinarca

== See also ==
- Communes of the Corse-du-Sud department
