= Canton of Sevi-Sorru-Cinarca =

Coordinates: 42.14°N 8.60°E

The canton of Sevi-Sorru-Cinarca is an administrative division of the Corse-du-Sud department, southeastern France. It was created at the French canton reorganisation which came into effect in March 2015. Its seat is in Cargèse.

It consists of the following communes:

1. Ambiegna
2. Arbori
3. Arro
4. Azzana
5. Balogna
6. Calcatoggio
7. Cannelle
8. Cargèse
9. Casaglione
10. Coggia
11. Cristinacce
12. Évisa
13. Guagno
14. Letia
15. Lopigna
16. Marignana
17. Murzo
18. Orto
19. Osani
20. Ota
21. Partinello
22. Pastricciola
23. Piana
24. Poggiolo
25. Renno
26. Rezza
27. Rosazia
28. Salice
29. Sant'Andréa-d'Orcino
30. Sari-d'Orcino
31. Serriera
32. Soccia
33. Vico
