= Évisa =

Commune in Corsica, France

- Commune
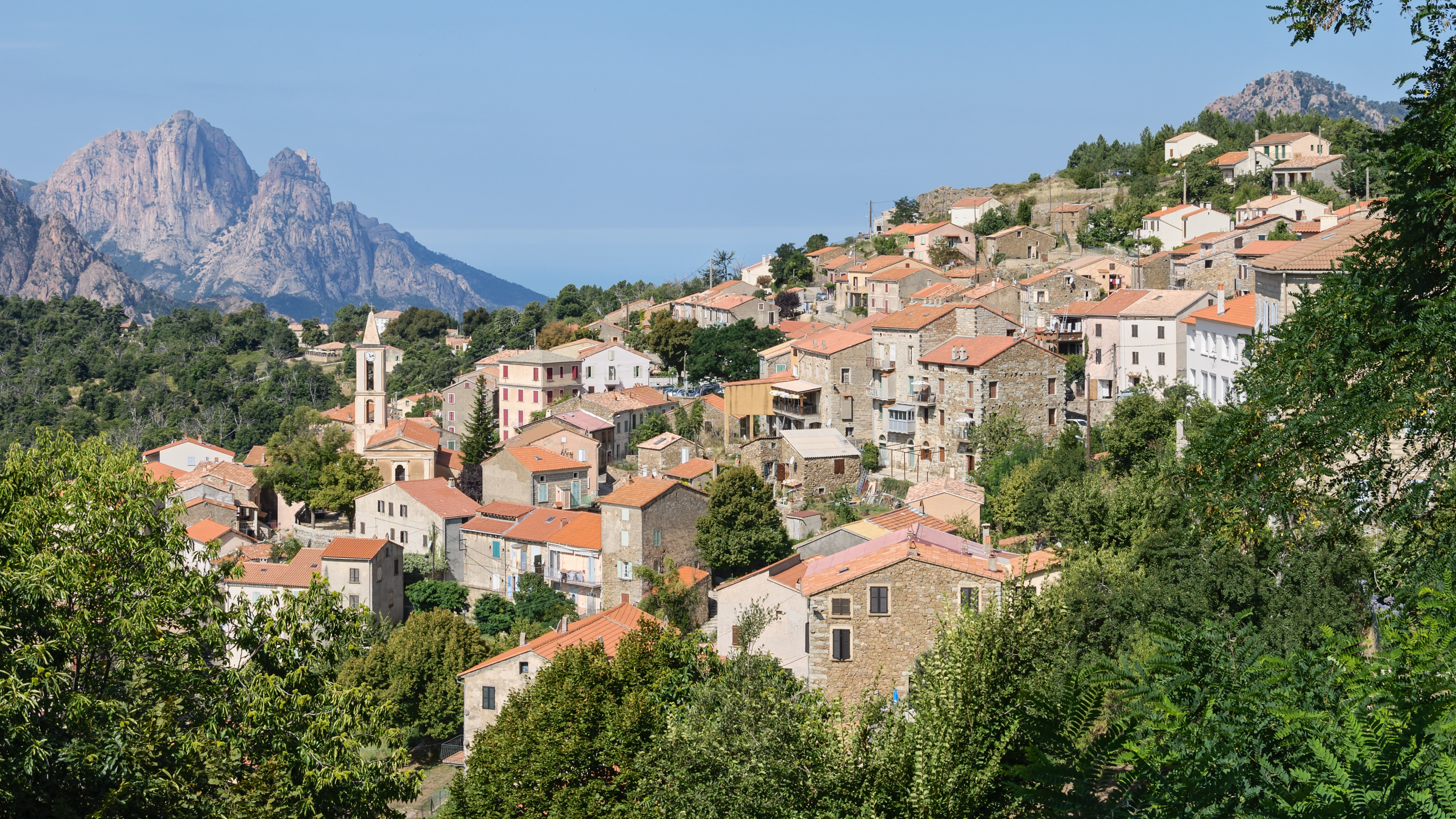
- A general view of Évisa. The Capu d'Ortu e Tre Signore is in the left background

- Coat of arms
- Location of Évisa
- Location within France Location within Corsica
- Coordinates: 42°15′16″N 8°48′07″E
- Country: France
- Region: Corsica
- Department: Corse-du-Sud
- Arrondissement: Ajaccio
- Canton: Sevi-Sorru-Cinarca

Government
  - Mayor (2020–2026): Jean Jacques Gianni
- Area^{1}: 67.28 km^{2} (25.98 sq mi)
- Elevation: 850 m (2,790 ft)
- Highest elevation: 2,103 m (6,900 ft)
- Lowest elevation: 239 m (784 ft)
- Population (2023): 231
  - Density: 3.43/km^{2} (8.89/sq mi)
- Time zone: UTC+01:00 (CET)
  - Summer (DST): UTC+02:00 (CEST)
- INSEE/Postal code: 2A108 /20126
- ^{1} French Land Register data, which excludes lakes, ponds, glaciers > 1 km^{2} (0.386 sq mi or 247 acres) and river estuaries.

Évisa (French pronunciation: [eviza]) is a commune in the Corse-du-Sud department of France on the island of Corsica.

== Geography ==
=== Climate ===
Évisa has a warm-summer mediterranean climate (Köppen climate classification Csb). The average annual temperature in Évisa is 12.6 °C (54.7 °F). The average annual rainfall is 1,181.2 mm (46.50 in) with November as the wettest month. The temperatures are highest on average in July, at around 21.7 °C (71.1 °F), and lowest in January, at around 5.3 °C (41.5 °F). The highest temperature ever recorded in Évisa was 40.0 °C (104.0 °F) on 11 July 1984; the coldest temperature ever recorded was −13.0 °C (8.6 °F) on 10 February 2013.

Climate data for Évisa (Village) (1981–2010 averages, extremes 1978−2012)
| Month | Jan | Feb | Mar | Apr | May | Jun | Jul | Aug | Sep | Oct | Nov | Dec | Year |
|---|---|---|---|---|---|---|---|---|---|---|---|---|---|
| Record high °C (°F) | 21.0 (69.8) | 22.0 (71.6) | 27.0 (80.6) | 28.0 (82.4) | 32.5 (90.5) | 36.0 (96.8) | 37.0 (98.6) | 38.0 (100.4) | 33.5 (92.3) | 28.5 (83.3) | 23.0 (73.4) | 22.3 (72.1) | 38.0 (100.4) |
| Mean daily maximum °C (°F) | 9.2 (48.6) | 9.8 (49.6) | 12.2 (54.0) | 14.7 (58.5) | 19.6 (67.3) | 23.5 (74.3) | 27.5 (81.5) | 27.4 (81.3) | 22.8 (73.0) | 18.4 (65.1) | 13.2 (55.8) | 10.0 (50.0) | 17.4 (63.3) |
| Daily mean °C (°F) | 5.3 (41.5) | 5.5 (41.9) | 7.7 (45.9) | 9.9 (49.8) | 14.5 (58.1) | 18.1 (64.6) | 21.7 (71.1) | 21.5 (70.7) | 17.4 (63.3) | 13.9 (57.0) | 9.2 (48.6) | 6.3 (43.3) | 12.6 (54.7) |
| Mean daily minimum °C (°F) | 1.3 (34.3) | 1.3 (34.3) | 3.2 (37.8) | 5.0 (41.0) | 9.4 (48.9) | 12.8 (55.0) | 15.8 (60.4) | 15.5 (59.9) | 12.0 (53.6) | 9.5 (49.1) | 5.2 (41.4) | 2.5 (36.5) | 7.8 (46.0) |
| Record low °C (°F) | −9.6 (14.7) | −10.0 (14.0) | −5.0 (23.0) | −4.0 (24.8) | −0.1 (31.8) | 1.6 (34.9) | 7.3 (45.1) | 2.5 (36.5) | 4.0 (39.2) | 1.0 (33.8) | −7.0 (19.4) | −8.0 (17.6) | −10.0 (14.0) |
| Average precipitation mm (inches) | 118.2 (4.65) | 90.4 (3.56) | 96.6 (3.80) | 119.1 (4.69) | 81.5 (3.21) | 47.2 (1.86) | 13.2 (0.52) | 27.6 (1.09) | 101.4 (3.99) | 147.8 (5.82) | 187.1 (7.37) | 151.1 (5.95) | 1,181.2 (46.50) |
| Average precipitation days (≥ 1.0 mm) | 9.3 | 8.7 | 8.6 | 10.5 | 7.4 | 4.5 | 1.7 | 3.1 | 7.0 | 9.2 | 11.2 | 10.7 | 91.9 |
Source: Meteociel

Climate data for Évisa (Maison Forestière d'Aitone) (1991–2020 averages, extremes 1974−present)
| Month | Jan | Feb | Mar | Apr | May | Jun | Jul | Aug | Sep | Oct | Nov | Dec | Year |
|---|---|---|---|---|---|---|---|---|---|---|---|---|---|
| Record high °C (°F) | 17.6 (63.7) | 21.8 (71.2) | 25.0 (77.0) | 26.4 (79.5) | 31.0 (87.8) | 35.5 (95.9) | 40.0 (104.0) | 36.5 (97.7) | 33.5 (92.3) | 27.0 (80.6) | 23.9 (75.0) | 20.0 (68.0) | 40.0 (104.0) |
| Mean daily maximum °C (°F) | 7.1 (44.8) | 7.9 (46.2) | 11.0 (51.8) | 13.5 (56.3) | 17.8 (64.0) | 22.3 (72.1) | 25.8 (78.4) | 26.0 (78.8) | 20.8 (69.4) | 16.8 (62.2) | 11.2 (52.2) | 7.8 (46.0) | 15.7 (60.3) |
| Daily mean °C (°F) | 3.2 (37.8) | 3.3 (37.9) | 6.0 (42.8) | 8.5 (47.3) | 12.3 (54.1) | 16.2 (61.2) | 19.0 (66.2) | 19.3 (66.7) | 15.0 (59.0) | 11.7 (53.1) | 7.0 (44.6) | 3.9 (39.0) | 10.4 (50.7) |
| Mean daily minimum °C (°F) | −0.8 (30.6) | −1.2 (29.8) | 1.0 (33.8) | 3.4 (38.1) | 6.8 (44.2) | 10.1 (50.2) | 12.2 (54.0) | 12.6 (54.7) | 9.2 (48.6) | 6.6 (43.9) | 2.9 (37.2) | 0.1 (32.2) | 5.2 (41.4) |
| Record low °C (°F) | −11.6 (11.1) | −13.0 (8.6) | −11.4 (11.5) | −6.2 (20.8) | −2.0 (28.4) | 1.0 (33.8) | 3.5 (38.3) | 4.5 (40.1) | 2.0 (35.6) | −4.0 (24.8) | −8.0 (17.6) | −9.9 (14.2) | −13.0 (8.6) |
| Average precipitation mm (inches) | 152.3 (6.00) | 130.3 (5.13) | 129.0 (5.08) | 130.5 (5.14) | 96.1 (3.78) | 59.3 (2.33) | 25.3 (1.00) | 36.6 (1.44) | 124.0 (4.88) | 179.2 (7.06) | 252.2 (9.93) | 209.9 (8.26) | 1,524.7 (60.03) |
| Average precipitation days (≥ 1.0 mm) | 11.0 | 9.8 | 9.4 | 10.5 | 7.8 | 5.4 | 2.7 | 3.3 | 7.2 | 10.1 | 12.5 | 12.5 | 102.1 |
Source: Météo-France

== Population ==
Historical population
| Year | Pop. | ±% p.a. |
|---|---|---|
| 1968 | 336 | — |
| 1975 | 312 | −1.05% |
| 1982 | 248 | −3.23% |
| 1990 | 257 | +0.45% |
| 1999 | 196 | −2.97% |
| 2007 | 182 | −0.92% |
| 2012 | 202 | +2.11% |
| 2017 | 219 | +1.63% |
| 2023 | 231 | +0.89% |
Source: INSEE

== See also ==
- Communes of the Corse-du-Sud department
