= Rosazia =

Commune in Corsica, France

- Commune
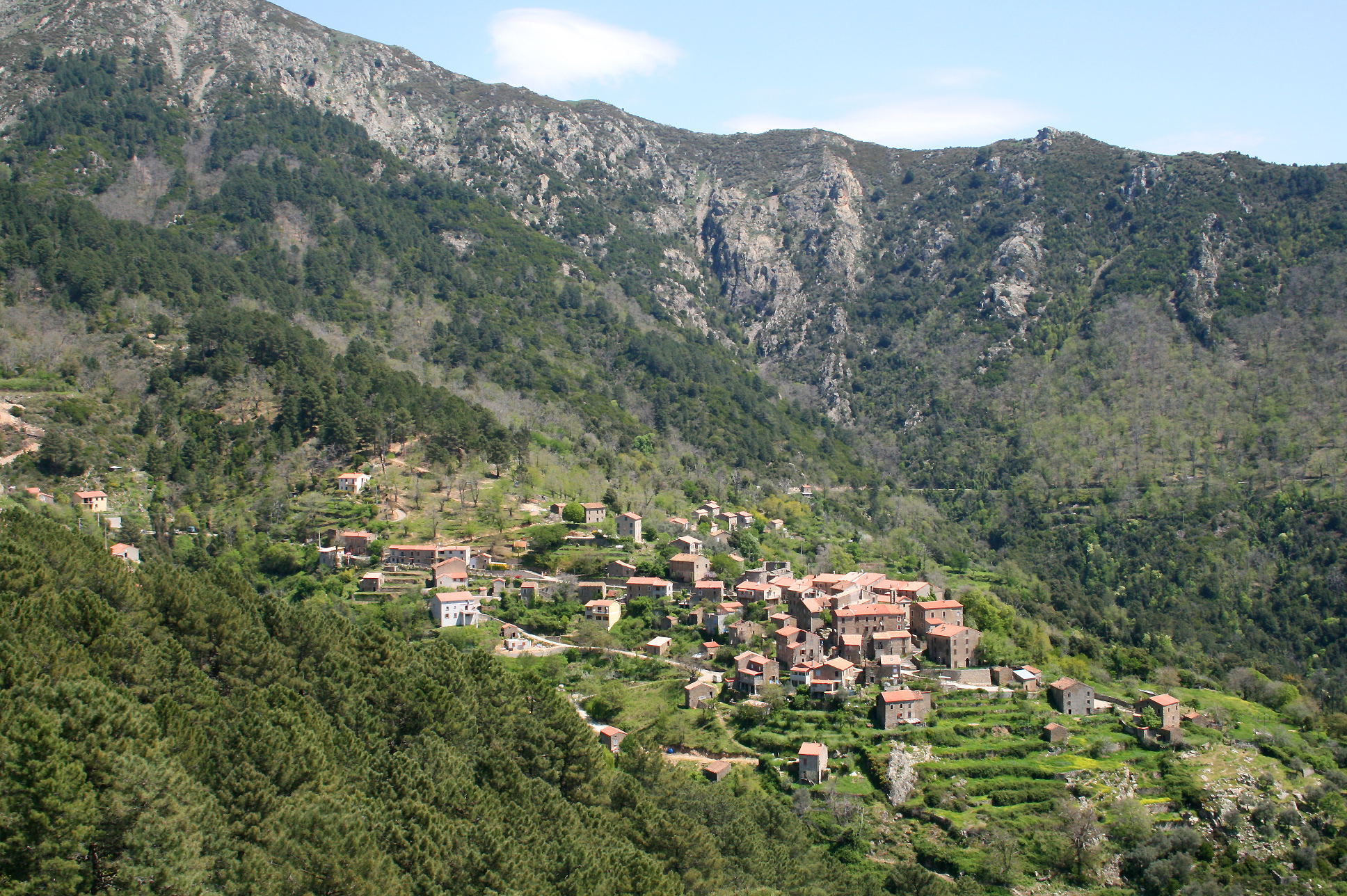
- The village of Rosazia, situated in a cirque
- Location of Rosazia
- Location within France Location within Corsica
- Coordinates: 42°07′44″N 8°52′31″E
- Country: France
- Region: Corsica
- Department: Corse-du-Sud
- Arrondissement: Ajaccio
- Canton: Sevi-Sorru-Cinarca

Government
  - Mayor (2020–2026): Xavier Poli
- Area^{1}: 19.72 km^{2} (7.61 sq mi)
- Elevation: 634 m (2,080 ft)
- Highest elevation: 1,622 m (5,322 ft)
- Lowest elevation: 67 m (220 ft)
- Population (2023): 53
  - Density: 2.7/km^{2} (7.0/sq mi)
- Time zone: UTC+01:00 (CET)
  - Summer (DST): UTC+02:00 (CEST)
- INSEE/Postal code: 2A262 /20121
- ^{1} French Land Register data, which excludes lakes, ponds, glaciers > 1 km^{2} (0.386 sq mi or 247 acres) and river estuaries.

Rosazia (French pronunciation: [ʁozatsja]; Corsican: Rusazia) is a commune in the Corse-du-Sud department of France on the island of Corsica.

== Population ==
Historical population
Year	Pop.	±% p.a.
1968	124	—
1975	105	−2.35%
1982	71	−5.44%
1990	65	−1.10%
1999	81	+2.48%
2007	55	−4.72%
2012	55	+0.00%
2017	49	−2.28%
2023	53	+1.32%
Source: INSEE

== See also ==
- Communes of the Corse-du-Sud department
