= Vico, Corse-du-Sud =

Commune in Corsica, France

Vico Vicu (Corsican)
- Commune
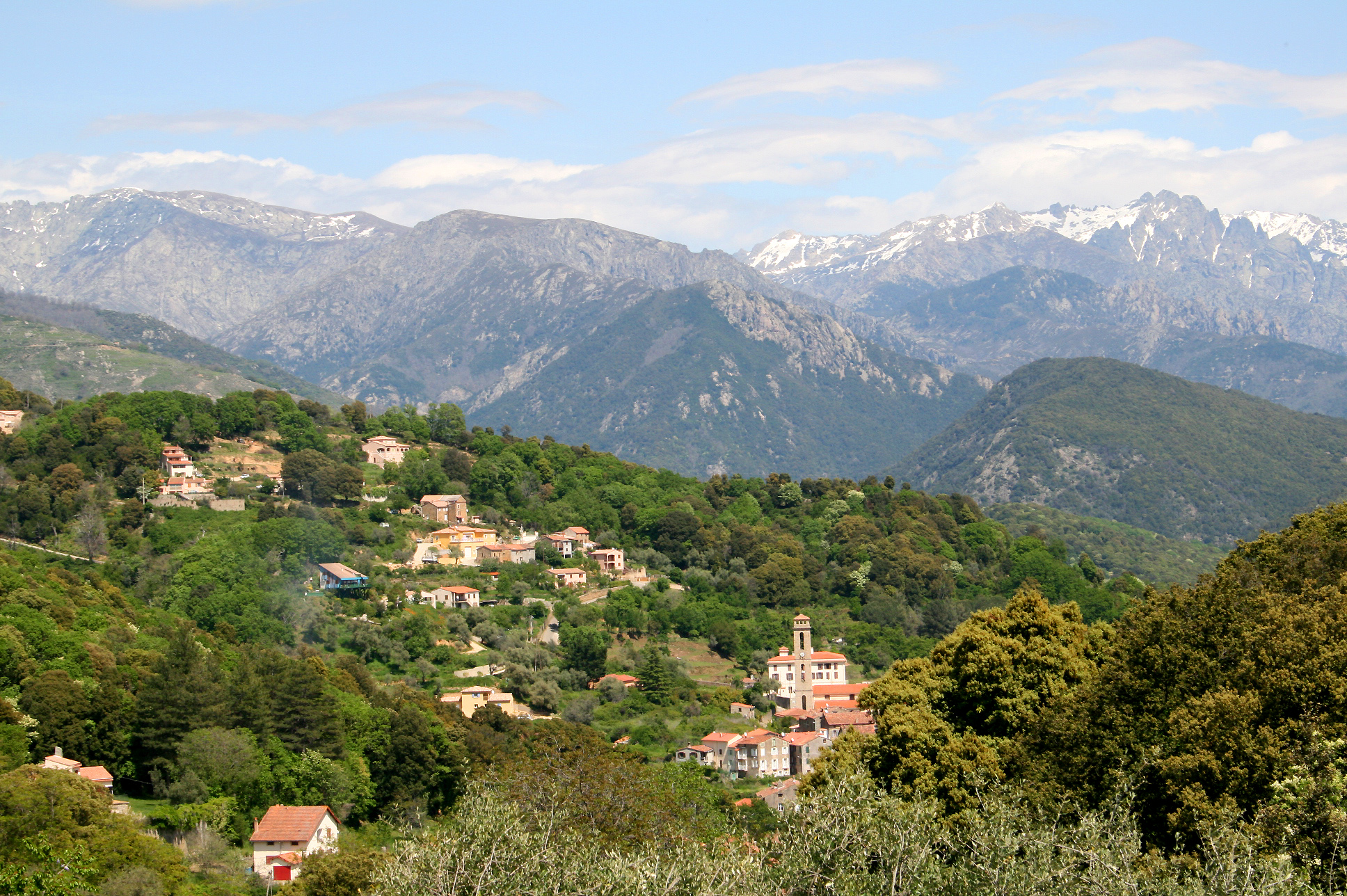
- A view of the village of Vico

- Coat of arms
- Location of Vico
- Location within France Location within Corsica
- Coordinates: 42°10′02″N 8°47′58″E
- Country: France
- Region: Corsica
- Department: Corse-du-Sud
- Arrondissement: Ajaccio
- Canton: Sevi-Sorru-Cinarca

Government
  - Mayor (2020–2026): François Colonna
- Area^{1}: 52.13 km^{2} (20.13 sq mi)
- Elevation: 400 m (1,300 ft)
- Highest elevation: 1,120 m (3,670 ft)
- Lowest elevation: 0 m (0 ft)
- Population (2023): 999
  - Density: 19.2/km^{2} (49.6/sq mi)
- Time zone: UTC+01:00 (CET)
  - Summer (DST): UTC+02:00 (CEST)
- INSEE/Postal code: 2A348 /20160
- ^{1} French Land Register data, which excludes lakes, ponds, glaciers > 1 km^{2} (0.386 sq mi or 247 acres) and river estuaries.

Vico (French pronunciation: [viko], Italian: [ˈviːko]; Corsican: Vicu, [ˈbiːɡu]) is a commune in the French department of Corse-du-Sud, on the island of Corsica.

The Sagone river flows through the commune from east to west, entering the sea in the village of Sagone. Sagone used to be the seat of a diocese, but by 1751 the town of Sagone was in ruins and uninhabited due to raids by Barbary pirates. The bishop lived inland in Vico, then a small town of some 800 inhabitants, under the civil government of Genoa. The corporation of the Cathedral Chapter still existed, with two dignities and six canons. In Vico there was one monastery of men.

== Population ==
Historical population
Year	Pop.	±% p.a.
1968	1,186	—
1975	1,484	+3.25%
1982	1,312	−1.74%
1990	921	−4.33%
1999	898	−0.28%
2007	932	+0.47%
2012	855	−1.71%
2017	912	+1.30%
2023	999	+1.53%
Source: INSEE

== Sights ==
- Torra di Sagone

== See also ==
- Communes of the Corse-du-Sud department
