= Canton of Ajaccio-3 =

Coordinates: 41.93°N 8.74°E

The canton of Ajaccio-3 is an administrative division of the Corse-du-Sud department, southeastern France. Its borders were modified at the French canton reorganisation which came into effect in March 2015. Its seat is in Ajaccio.

It consists of the following communes:

1. Ajaccio (partly)
