= Rezza =

Commune in Corsica, France

- Commune
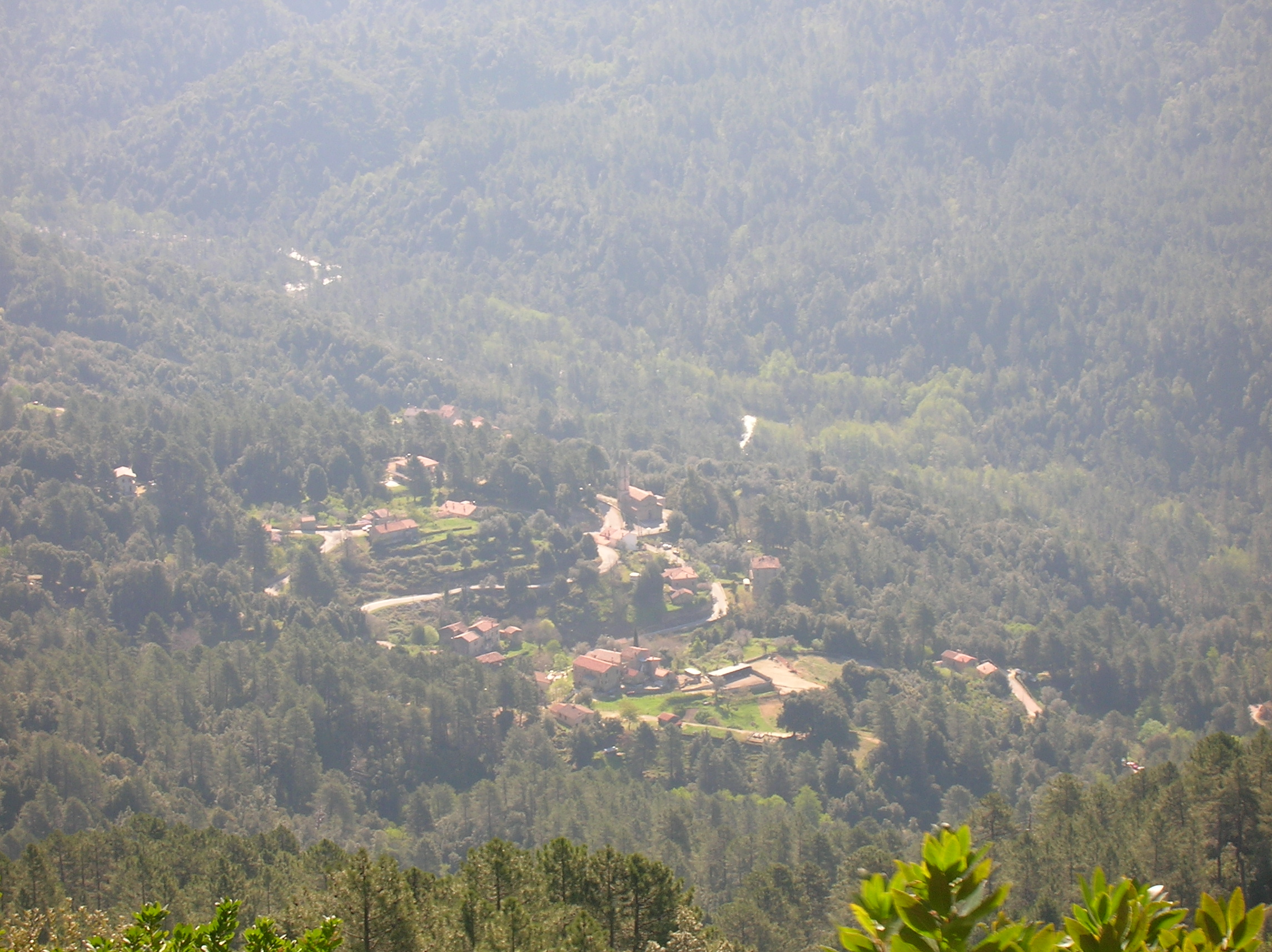
- The village of Rezza seen from the trail to Salincaccia
- Location of Rezza
- Location within France Location within Corsica
- Coordinates: 42°07′34″N 8°56′37″E
- Country: France
- Region: Corsica
- Department: Corse-du-Sud
- Arrondissement: Ajaccio
- Canton: Sevi-Sorru-Cinarca

Government
  - Mayor (2020–2026): Paul-François Pomponi
- Area^{1}: 13.46 km^{2} (5.20 sq mi)
- Elevation: 400 m (1,300 ft)
- Highest elevation: 1,284 m (4,213 ft)
- Lowest elevation: 272 m (892 ft)
- Population (2023): 61
  - Density: 4.5/km^{2} (12/sq mi)
- Time zone: UTC+01:00 (CET)
  - Summer (DST): UTC+02:00 (CEST)
- INSEE/Postal code: 2A259 /20121
- ^{1} French Land Register data, which excludes lakes, ponds, glaciers > 1 km^{2} (0.386 sq mi or 247 acres) and river estuaries.

Rezza (French pronunciation: [ʁɛtsa]; Corsican: a Reza) is a commune in the Corse-du-Sud department of France on the island of Corsica.

== Population ==
Historical population
Year	Pop.	±% p.a.
1968	71	—
1975	48	−5.44%
1982	47	−0.30%
1990	50	+0.78%
1999	49	−0.22%
2007	81	+6.48%
2012	54	−7.79%
2017	54	+0.00%
2023	61	+2.05%
Source: INSEE

== See also ==
- Communes of the Corse-du-Sud department
