= Salice =

Commune in Corsica, France

- Commune
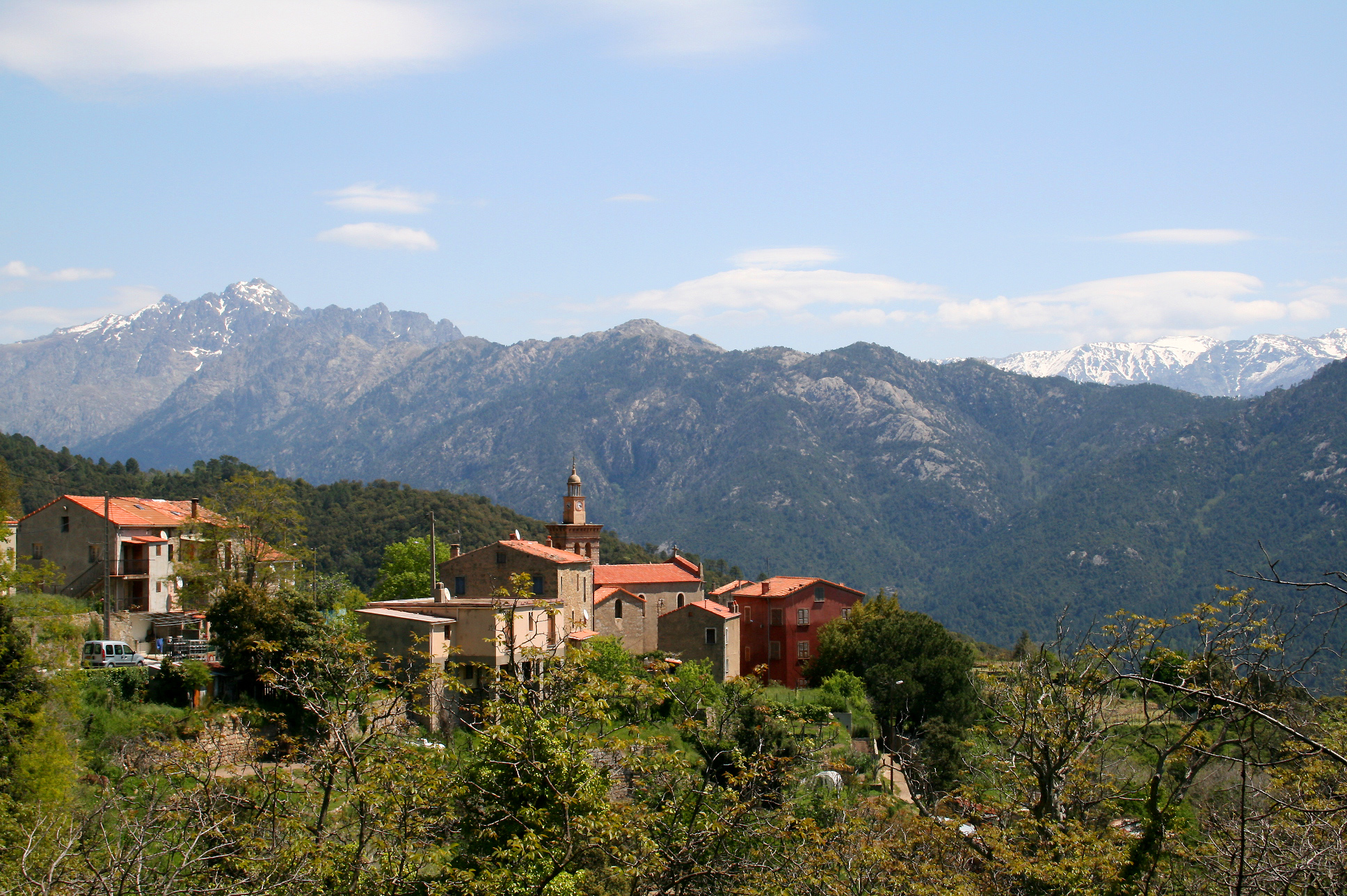
- The area around the church, in Salice
- Location of Salice
- Location within France Location within Corsica
- Coordinates: 42°07′18″N 8°54′05″E
- Country: France
- Region: Corsica
- Department: Corse-du-Sud
- Arrondissement: Ajaccio
- Canton: Sevi-Sorru-Cinarca

Government
  - Mayor (2020–2026): Jean-Pierre Giordani
- Area^{1}: 21.89 km^{2} (8.45 sq mi)
- Elevation: 610 m (2,000 ft)
- Highest elevation: 1,622 m (5,322 ft)
- Lowest elevation: 152 m (499 ft)
- Population (2023): 102
  - Density: 4.66/km^{2} (12.1/sq mi)
- Time zone: UTC+01:00 (CET)
  - Summer (DST): UTC+02:00 (CEST)
- INSEE/Postal code: 2A266 /20121
- ^{1} French Land Register data, which excludes lakes, ponds, glaciers > 1 km^{2} (0.386 sq mi or 247 acres) and river estuaries.

Salice is a commune in the Corse-du-Sud department of France on the island of Corsica.

== Population ==
Historical population
Year	Pop.	±% p.a.
1968	201	—
1975	164	−2.86%
1982	113	−5.18%
1990	77	−4.68%
1999	73	−0.59%
2007	102	+4.27%
2012	75	−5.96%
2017	91	+3.94%
2023	102	+1.92%
Source: INSEE

== See also ==
- Communes of the Corse-du-Sud department
