= Marignana =

Commune in Corsica, France

- Commune
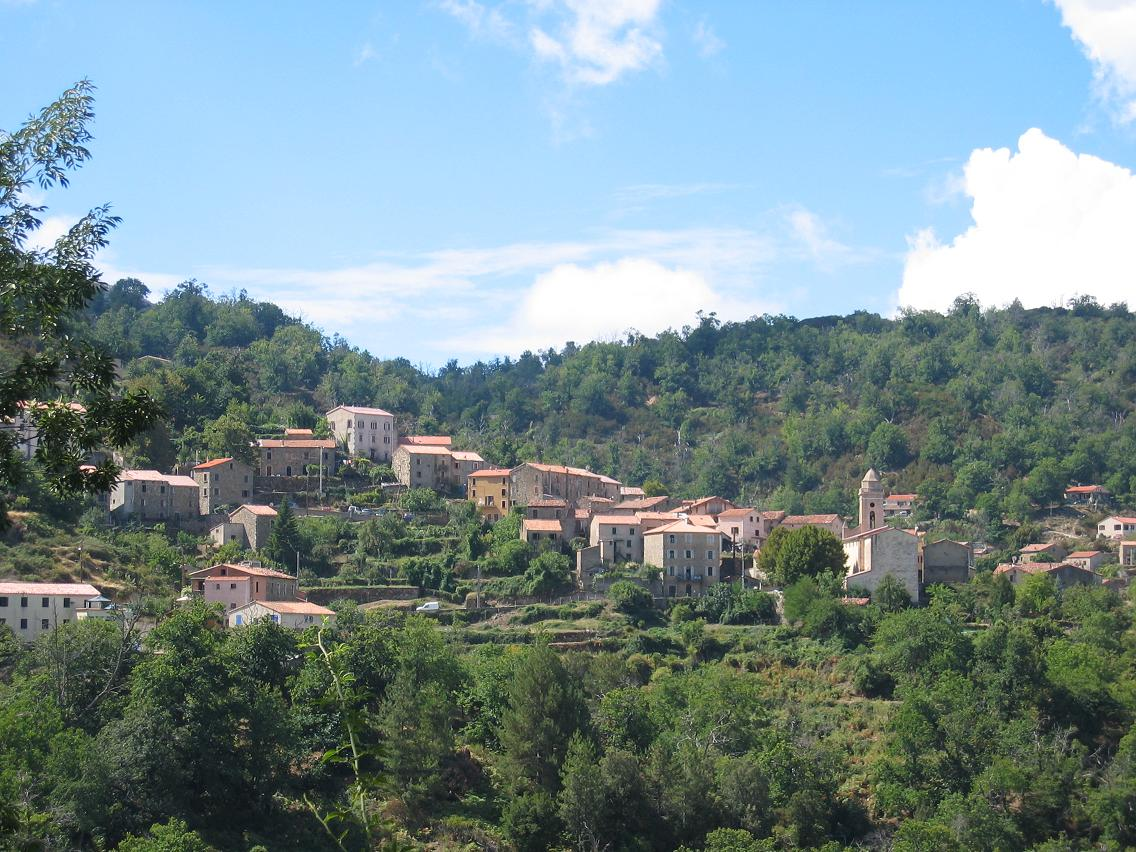
- A general view of Marignana
- Location of Marignana
- Location within France Location within Corsica
- Coordinates: 42°14′03″N 8°48′04″E
- Country: France
- Region: Corsica
- Department: Corse-du-Sud
- Arrondissement: Ajaccio
- Canton: Sevi-Sorru-Cinarca

Government
  - Mayor (2020–2026): Mathieu Ceccaldi
- Area^{1}: 55.09 km^{2} (21.27 sq mi)
- Elevation: 750 m (2,460 ft)
- Highest elevation: 1,332 m (4,370 ft)
- Lowest elevation: 13 m (43 ft)
- Population (2023): 100
  - Density: 1.8/km^{2} (4.7/sq mi)
- Time zone: UTC+01:00 (CET)
  - Summer (DST): UTC+02:00 (CEST)
- INSEE/Postal code: 2A154 /20141
- ^{1} French Land Register data, which excludes lakes, ponds, glaciers > 1 km^{2} (0.386 sq mi or 247 acres) and river estuaries.

Marignana (French pronunciation: [maʁiɲana]) is a commune in the Corse-du-Sud department of France on the island of Corsica.

== Geography ==
=== Climate ===
Marignana has a hot-summer Mediterranean climate (Köppen climate classification Csa). The average annual temperature in Marignana is 15.7 °C (60.3 °F). The average annual rainfall is 740.0 mm (29.13 in) with November as the wettest month. The temperatures are highest on average in August, at around 24.4 °C (75.9 °F), and lowest in February, at around 8.5 °C (47.3 °F). The highest temperature ever recorded in Marignana was 39.3 °C (102.7 °F) on 3 August 2017; the coldest temperature ever recorded was −3.2 °C (26.2 °F) on 11 February 2012.

Climate data for Marignana (1991−2020 normals, extremes 2009−present)
Month	Jan	Feb	Mar	Apr	May	Jun	Jul	Aug	Sep	Oct	Nov	Dec	Year
Record high °C (°F)	19.3 (66.7)	21.2 (70.2)	25.7 (78.3)	29.5 (85.1)	33.1 (91.6)	35.9 (96.6)	38.8 (101.8)	39.3 (102.7)	33.3 (91.9)	31.0 (87.8)	23.8 (74.8)	19.6 (67.3)	39.3 (102.7)
Mean daily maximum °C (°F)	11.3 (52.3)	11.5 (52.7)	13.9 (57.0)	17.2 (63.0)	20.2 (68.4)	24.8 (76.6)	28.1 (82.6)	28.5 (83.3)	24.5 (76.1)	20.7 (69.3)	15.8 (60.4)	12.6 (54.7)	19.1 (66.4)
Daily mean °C (°F)	8.7 (47.7)	8.5 (47.3)	10.6 (51.1)	13.7 (56.7)	16.6 (61.9)	21.0 (69.8)	24.0 (75.2)	24.4 (75.9)	20.8 (69.4)	17.3 (63.1)	13.1 (55.6)	10.0 (50.0)	15.7 (60.3)
Mean daily minimum °C (°F)	6.1 (43.0)	5.5 (41.9)	7.4 (45.3)	10.2 (50.4)	13.0 (55.4)	17.2 (63.0)	19.9 (67.8)	20.3 (68.5)	17.0 (62.6)	14.0 (57.2)	10.3 (50.5)	7.4 (45.3)	12.4 (54.3)
Record low °C (°F)	−1.4 (29.5)	−3.2 (26.2)	−0.3 (31.5)	0.1 (32.2)	4.5 (40.1)	10.6 (51.1)	13.4 (56.1)	13.0 (55.4)	8.2 (46.8)	2.3 (36.1)	2.0 (35.6)	−1.5 (29.3)	−3.2 (26.2)
Average precipitation mm (inches)	79.4 (3.13)	79.5 (3.13)	68.5 (2.70)	63.1 (2.48)	57.5 (2.26)	32.3 (1.27)	13.2 (0.52)	14.7 (0.58)	42.8 (1.69)	81.2 (3.20)	123.1 (4.85)	84.7 (3.33)	740.0 (29.13)
Average precipitation days (≥ 1.0 mm)	9.3	8.6	7.3	7.6	5.8	3.2	1.6	1.8	5.1	7.2	10.3	9.2	76.8
Source: Météo-France

== Population ==
Historical population
Year	Pop.	±% p.a.
1968	150	—
1975	105	−4.97%
1982	90	−2.18%
1990	120	+3.66%
1999	101	−1.90%
2007	107	+0.72%
2012	102	−0.95%
2017	110	+1.52%
2023	100	−1.58%
Source: INSEE

== See also ==
- Communes of the Corse-du-Sud department
