= Lopigna =

Commune in Corsica, France

- Commune
- Location of Lopigna
- Location within France Location within Corsica
- Coordinates: 42°06′07″N 8°50′39″E
- Country: France
- Region: Corsica
- Department: Corse-du-Sud
- Arrondissement: Ajaccio
- Canton: Sevi-Sorru-Cinarca

Government
  - Mayor (2020–2026): Pierre Nebbia
- Area^{1}: 19.53 km^{2} (7.54 sq mi)
- Elevation: 400 m (1,300 ft)
- Highest elevation: 1,038 m (3,406 ft)
- Lowest elevation: 40 m (130 ft)
- Population (2023): 113
  - Density: 5.79/km^{2} (15.0/sq mi)
- Time zone: UTC+01:00 (CET)
  - Summer (DST): UTC+02:00 (CEST)
- INSEE/Postal code: 2A144 /20139
- ^{1} French Land Register data, which excludes lakes, ponds, glaciers > 1 km^{2} (0.386 sq mi or 247 acres) and river estuaries.

Lopigna (French pronunciation: [lɔpiɲa]) is a commune in the Corse-du-Sud department of France on the island of Corsica.

== Population ==
Historical population
Year	Pop.	±% p.a.
1968	213	—
1975	149	−4.98%
1982	101	−5.40%
1990	109	+0.96%
1999	112	+0.30%
2007	108	−0.45%
2012	99	−1.73%
2017	103	+0.80%
2023	113	+1.56%
Source: INSEE

== See also ==
- Communes of the Corse-du-Sud department
