= Sollacaro =

Commune in Corsica, France

Sollacaro Suddacarò
- Commune
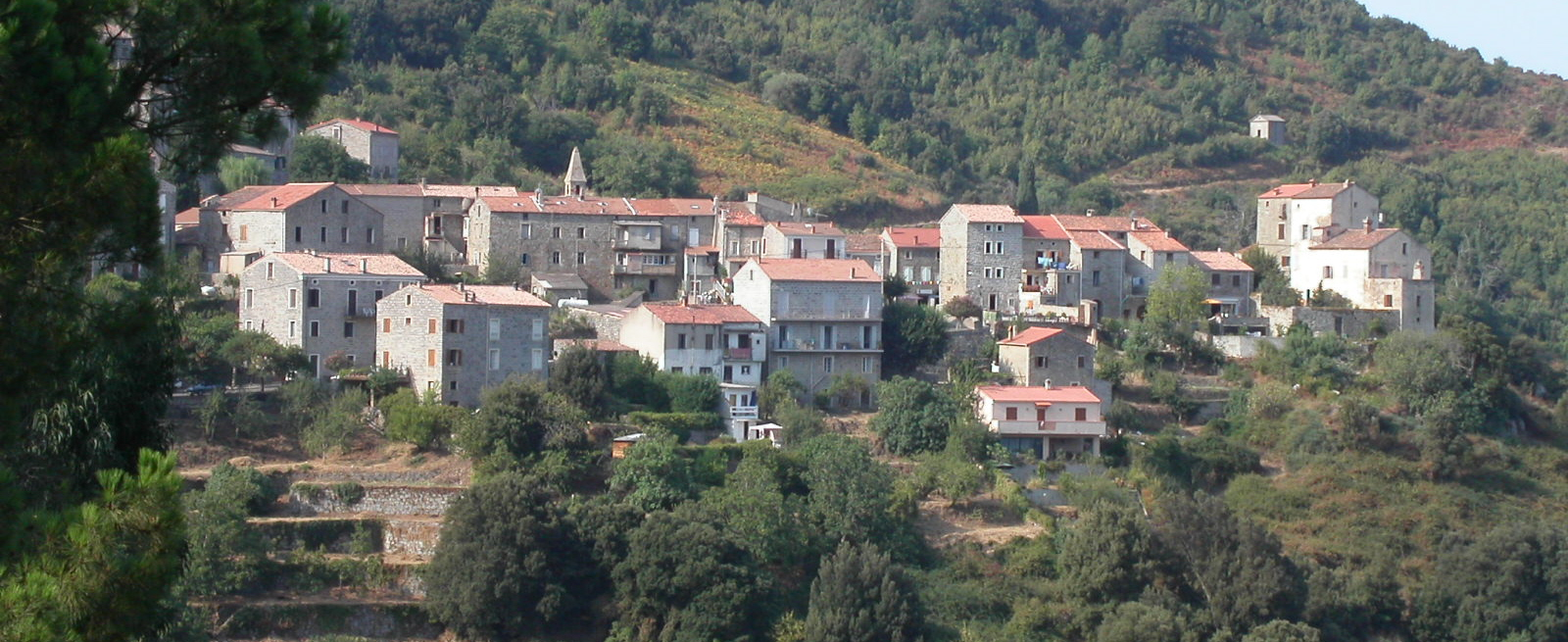
- A general view of the village of Sollacaro
- Location of Sollacaro
- Location within France Location within Corsica
- Coordinates: 41°44′36″N 8°54′41″E
- Country: France
- Region: Corsica
- Department: Corse-du-Sud
- Arrondissement: Sartène
- Canton: Taravo-Ornano

Government
  - Mayor (2020–2026): Jean Jacques Bartoli
- Area^{1}: 23.89 km^{2} (9.22 sq mi)
- Elevation: 450 m (1,480 ft)
- Highest elevation: 814 m (2,671 ft)
- Lowest elevation: 0 m (0 ft)
- Population (2023): 396
  - Density: 16.6/km^{2} (42.9/sq mi)
- Time zone: UTC+01:00 (CET)
  - Summer (DST): UTC+02:00 (CEST)
- INSEE/Postal code: 2A284 /20140
- ^{1} French Land Register data, which excludes lakes, ponds, glaciers > 1 km^{2} (0.386 sq mi or 247 acres) and river estuaries.

Sollacaro (French pronunciation: [sɔlakaʁo]; Italian: Sollacarò, pronounced [sollakaˈrɔ]; Corsican: Suddacarò) is a commune in the Corse-du-Sud department of France on the island of Corsica.

== Geography ==
The village is located at 450 m of altitude in the Taravo valley, on the departmental road 302, linking the Celaccia gap to Pisciatello (close to Ajaccio) via Pila-Canale.

A large part of the village is on the northwest side of a hill therefore there is no morning sun except for the Torre and adjacent neighbourhoods situated on a rocky spur.

Sollacaro is 25 km (16 mi) southeast from the prefecture, Ajaccio, 14 km (8.7 mi) north of the subprefecture Sartène and 8 km (5.0 mi) north of Propriano.

=== Climate ===
Sollacaro has a hot-summer mediterranean climate (Köppen climate classification Csa). The average annual temperature in Sollacaro is 15.4 °C (59.7 °F). The average annual rainfall is 729.3 mm (28.71 in) with November as the wettest month. The temperatures are highest on average in August, at around 23.7 °C (74.7 °F), and lowest in January, at around 8.6 °C (47.5 °F). The highest temperature ever recorded in Sollacaro was 43.5 °C (110.3 °F) on 23 July 2009; the coldest temperature ever recorded was −6.2 °C (20.8 °F) on 2 January 2002.

Climate data for Sollacaro (1981–2010 averages, extremes 1990−2014)
Month	Jan	Feb	Mar	Apr	May	Jun	Jul	Aug	Sep	Oct	Nov	Dec	Year
Record high °C (°F)	21.5 (70.7)	25.0 (77.0)	30.0 (86.0)	32.0 (89.6)	37.0 (98.6)	40.0 (104.0)	43.5 (110.3)	41.0 (105.8)	38.4 (101.1)	33.8 (92.8)	28.0 (82.4)	23.5 (74.3)	43.5 (110.3)
Mean daily maximum °C (°F)	14.0 (57.2)	14.4 (57.9)	17.1 (62.8)	19.3 (66.7)	24.3 (75.7)	28.3 (82.9)	31.6 (88.9)	31.8 (89.2)	27.3 (81.1)	23.3 (73.9)	17.9 (64.2)	14.5 (58.1)	22.0 (71.6)
Daily mean °C (°F)	8.6 (47.5)	8.6 (47.5)	10.5 (50.9)	12.8 (55.0)	17.1 (62.8)	20.6 (69.1)	23.2 (73.8)	23.7 (74.7)	20.3 (68.5)	17.2 (63.0)	12.8 (55.0)	9.4 (48.9)	15.4 (59.7)
Mean daily minimum °C (°F)	3.2 (37.8)	2.8 (37.0)	3.9 (39.0)	6.4 (43.5)	9.9 (49.8)	12.9 (55.2)	14.8 (58.6)	15.6 (60.1)	13.3 (55.9)	11.1 (52.0)	7.6 (45.7)	4.4 (39.9)	8.9 (48.0)
Record low °C (°F)	−6.2 (20.8)	−6.1 (21.0)	−3.0 (26.6)	0.0 (32.0)	2.5 (36.5)	6.5 (43.7)	8.0 (46.4)	9.5 (49.1)	6.9 (44.4)	1.0 (33.8)	−4.8 (23.4)	−5.0 (23.0)	−6.2 (20.8)
Average precipitation mm (inches)	67.1 (2.64)	47.2 (1.86)	56.3 (2.22)	61.1 (2.41)	54.3 (2.14)	23.9 (0.94)	7.3 (0.29)	18.0 (0.71)	66.2 (2.61)	108.5 (4.27)	126.5 (4.98)	92.9 (3.66)	729.3 (28.71)
Average precipitation days (≥ 1.0 mm)	7.9	7.3	7.1	8.3	5.5	3.1	1.1	2.2	5.7	8.8	10.7	10.5	78.1
Source: Meteociel

== Population ==
Historical population
Year	Pop.	±% p.a.
1968	448	—
1975	355	−3.27%
1982	290	−2.85%
1990	324	+1.40%
1999	326	+0.07%
2007	342	+0.60%
2012	350	+0.46%
2017	363	+0.73%
2023	396	+1.46%
Source: INSEE

== See also ==
- Communes of the Corse-du-Sud department
