= Albitreccia =

Commune in Corsica, France

- Commune
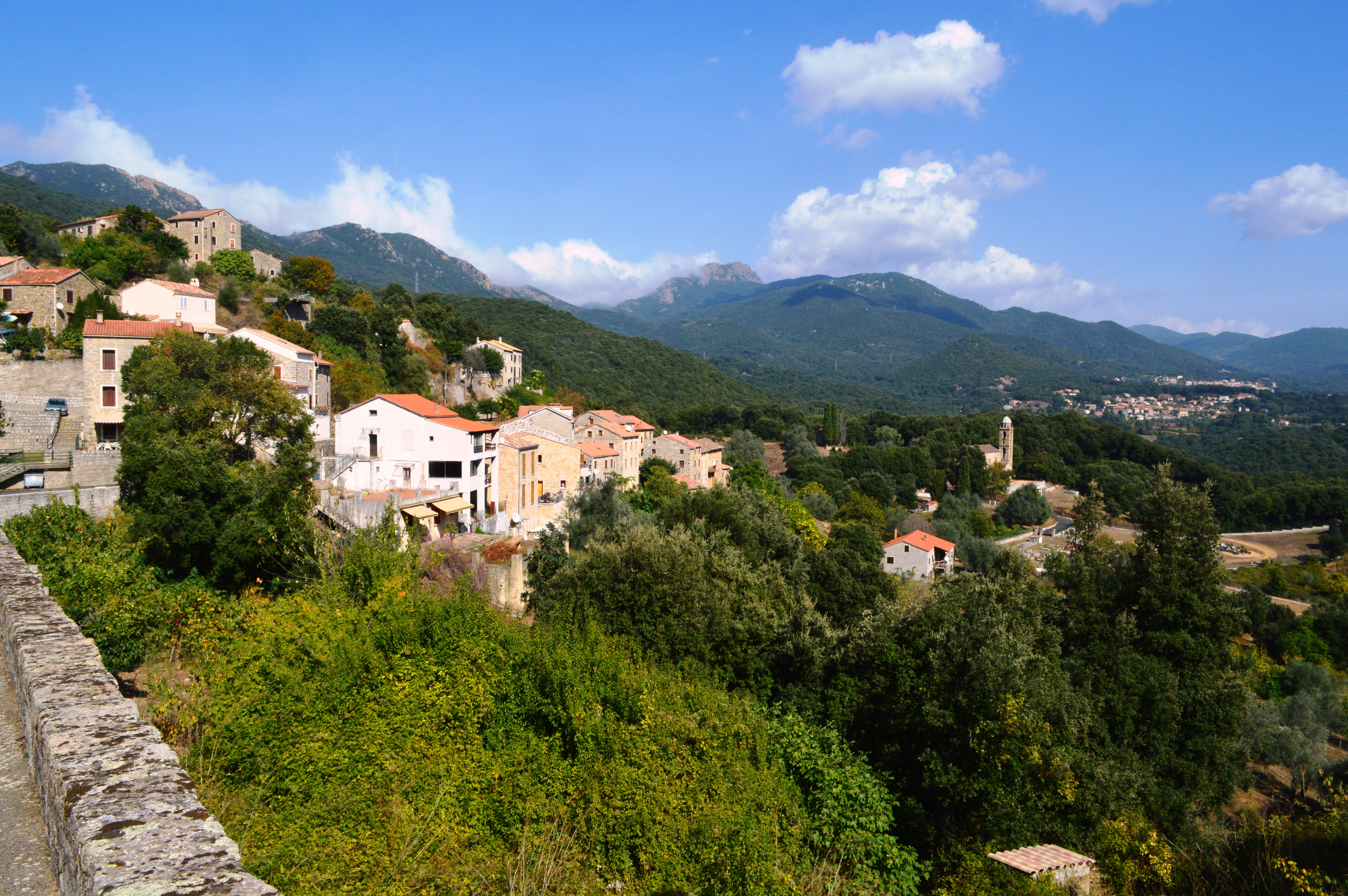
- Albitreccia Village
- Location of Albitreccia
- Location within France Location within Corsica
- Coordinates: 41°51′48″N 8°56′33″E
- Country: France
- Region: Corsica
- Department: Corse-du-Sud
- Arrondissement: Ajaccio
- Canton: Taravo-Ornano
- Intercommunality: CC de la Pieve de l'Ornano et du Taravo

Government
  - Mayor (2020–2026): Pierre-Paul Luciani
- Area^{1}: 45.76 km^{2} (17.67 sq mi)
- Elevation: 425 m (1,394 ft)
- Highest elevation: 1,058 m (3,471 ft)
- Lowest elevation: 0 m (0 ft)
- Population (2023): 1,833
  - Density: 40.06/km^{2} (103.7/sq mi)
- Time zone: UTC+01:00 (CET)
  - Summer (DST): UTC+02:00 (CEST)
- INSEE/Postal code: 2A008 /20128
- ^{1} French Land Register data, which excludes lakes, ponds, glaciers > 1 km^{2} (0.386 sq mi or 247 acres) and river estuaries.

Albitreccia is a commune in the Corse-du-Sud department in the Corsica region of France.

== Geography ==
Albitreccia is a commune in the Canton of Taravo-Ornano in South Corsica. The main village is located in the Taravo valley near the village of Grosseto. The commune has several centres of population: Molini (Alzone) and its extent behind Agosta beach, Bisina, Monti-Rossu and the hamlets of Buselga, Beddi Vaddi, San giorghju a Masina, and the ruined hamlet of U Pianu located upstream of Monti rossu under the Cozzanicciu and Tassiccia mountains over 1,000m high. There is hiking on Mare a Mare Centre which crosses the commune to join the col Saint-Georges and continues in the Taravo heights until it reaches the famous GR 20.

The commune has several access points. From the N193 highway inland the D55 road goes south through the commune joining the D302 on the south-western border. From the D55 the D2 links to the village of Albitreccia. The D2 continues south to meet the D102 at the southern border. The D102 crosses the eastern side of the commune but does not pass through any villages. In the west of the commune the D302 comes south from Fica passing through the hamlet of Bisinao before continuing to Cognocoli-Monticchi. The D255 also links with the D302 from the south. In the east access is via the D55 which follows the length of the coast.

== Administration ==
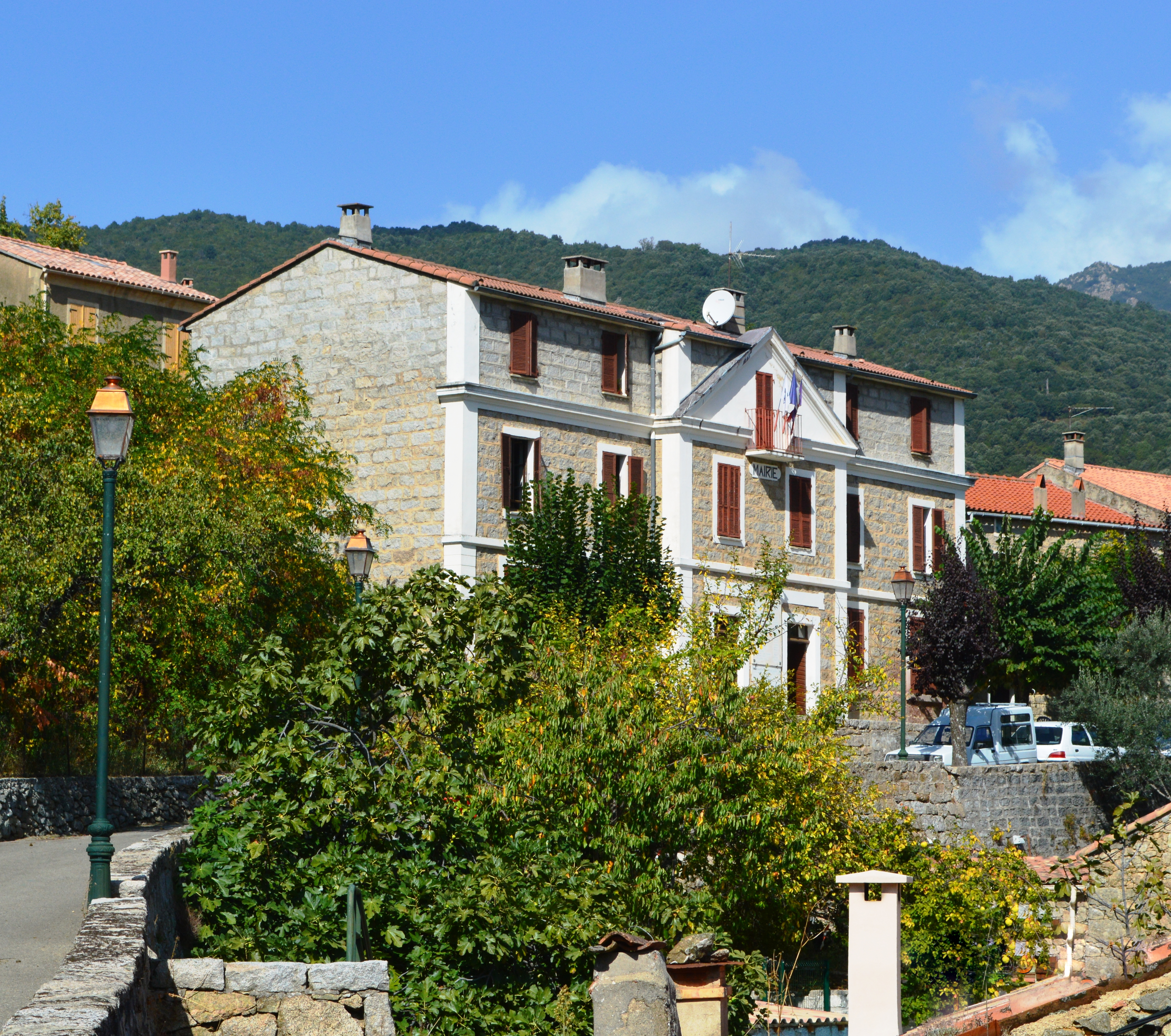
The Town Hall

List of Successive Mayors of Albitreccia

| From | To | Name | Party |
|---|---|---|---|
| 2001 | 2026 | Pierre-Paul Luciani | DVD |

== Population ==
Historical population
| Year | Pop. | ±% p.a. |
|---|---|---|
| 1968 | 248 | — |
| 1975 | 283 | +1.90% |
| 1982 | 456 | +7.05% |
| 1990 | 609 | +3.68% |
| 1999 | 867 | +4.00% |
| 2007 | 1,379 | +5.97% |
| 2012 | 1,566 | +2.58% |
| 2017 | 1,705 | +1.72% |
| 2023 | 1,833 | +1.21% |
Source: INSEE

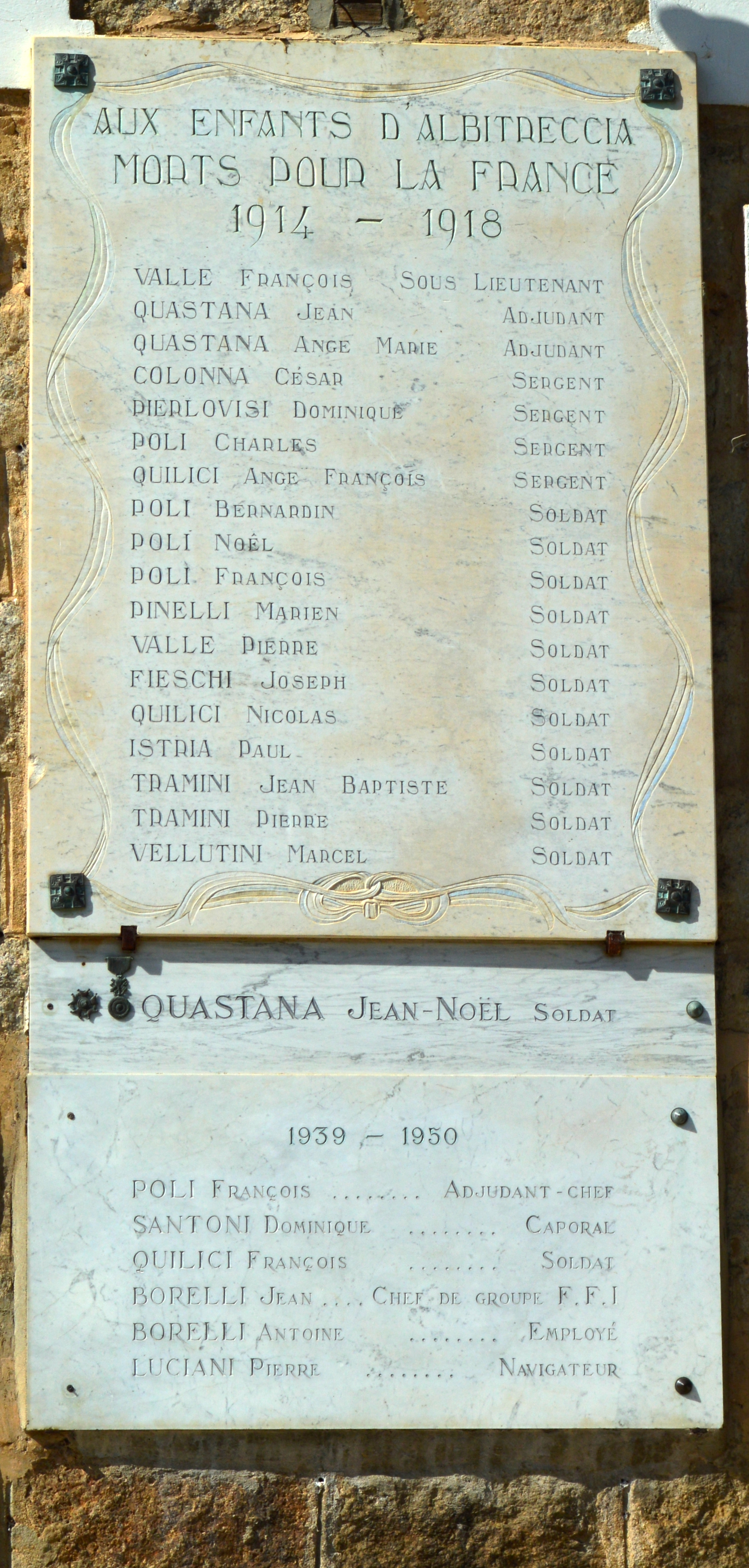
Albitreccia War Memorial

== Culture and heritage ==
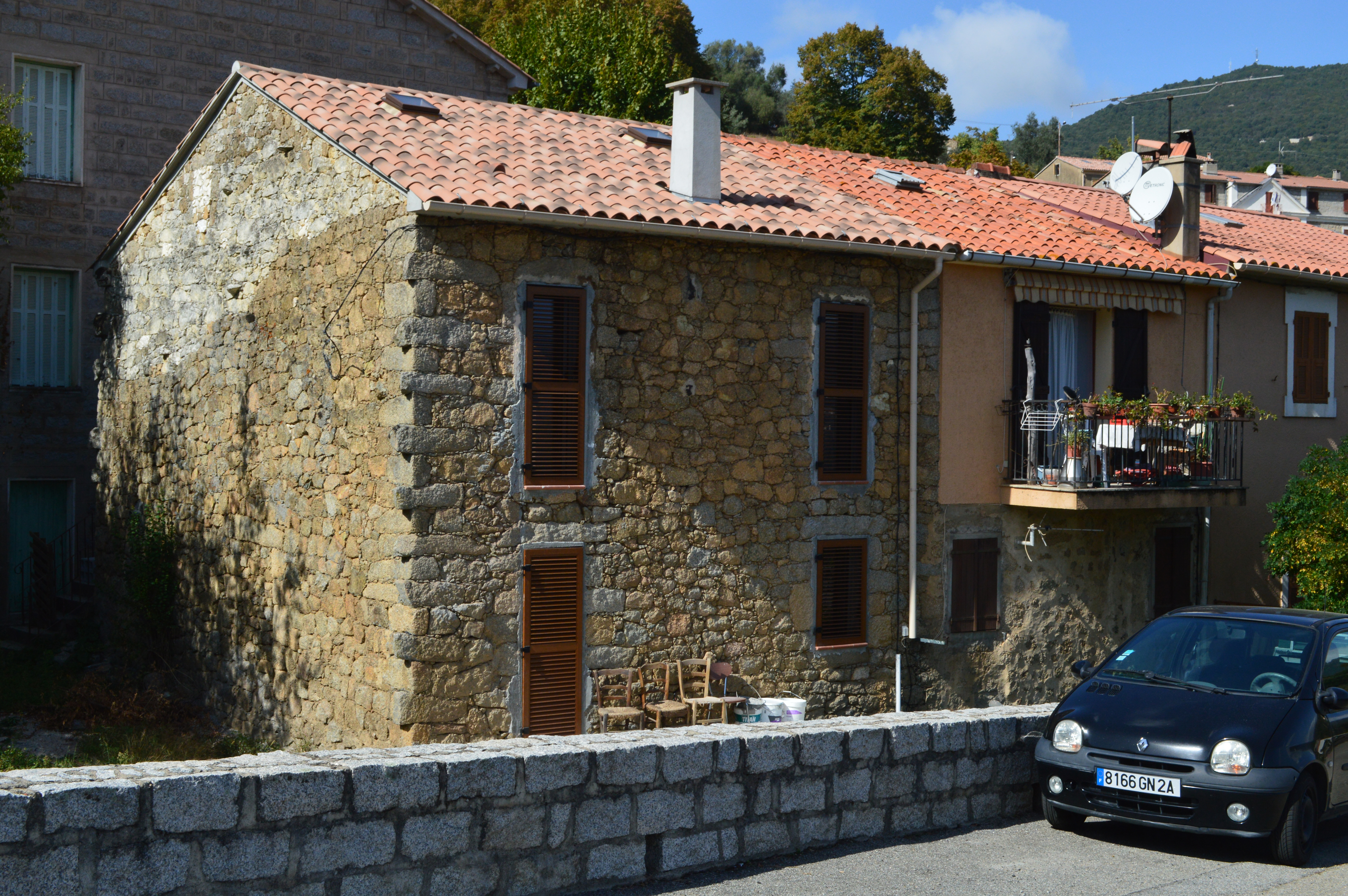
House 15

=== Civil heritage ===
The commune has a large number of buildings that are registered as historical monuments:

- House 15 (15th century)
- House 17 (16th century)
- House 24 (20th century)
- House 25 (1687)
- House 26 (1749)
- House 29 (1584)
- House 30 (17th century)
- House 31 (16th century)
- House 35 (16th century)
- House 36 at Bisinao (1810)
- House 37 at Bisinao (19th century)
- House 39 at Bisinao (1835)
- House 3 (20th century)
- House 40 at Bisinao (20th century)
- House 41 at Bisinao (20th century)
- House 43 at Bisinao (1861)
- House 46 at Molini (18th century)
- House 7 (17th century)
- House 41 (20th century)
- House 8 (1906)
- House 9 (19th century)
- House 14 (19th century)
- Town Hall and School (1904)
- Houses of Albitreccia (16th to 20th century)

=== Religious heritage ===
The commune has two religious buildings that are registered as historical monuments:

- The Church of Saint-Pierre (19th century). The church has one item that is registered as an historical monument:
  - Furniture in the Church of Saint-Pierre

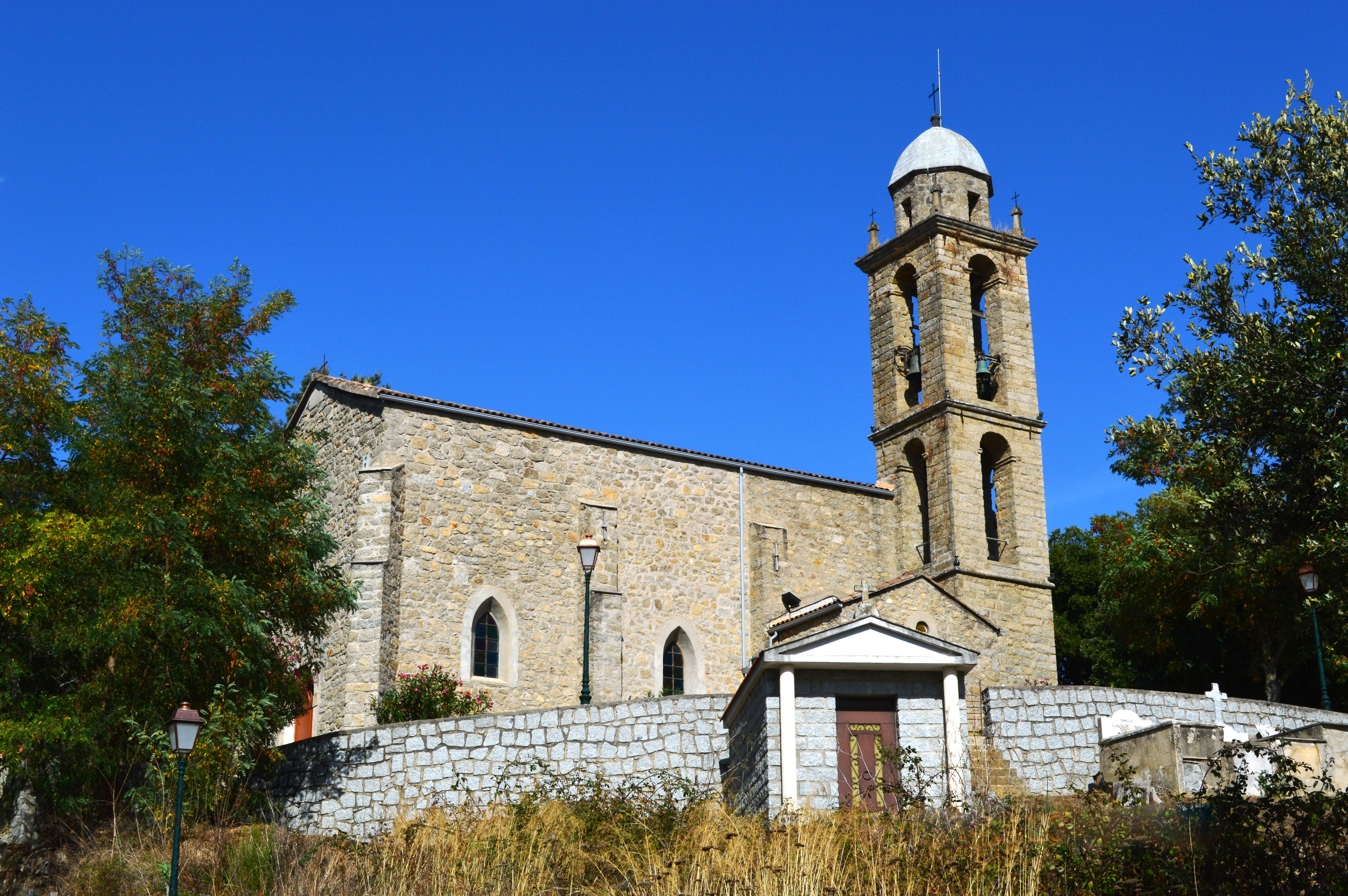
The Church of Saint Catherine

- The Parish Church of Saint-Catherine (1854). The church contains many items which are registered as historical objects:
  - Furniture in the Church of Saint-Catherine
  - A Ciborium (19th century)
  - A Monstrance (18th century)
  - A Statue: Virgin du Rosaire (19th century)
  - A Statue: Notre-Dame du Mont-Carmel (19th century)
  - A Statue: Saint Catherine of Alexandria (19th century)
  - A Tabernacle (17th century)
  - A Processional Statue: Saint Jules (20th century)

=== Albitreccia Picture Gallery ===
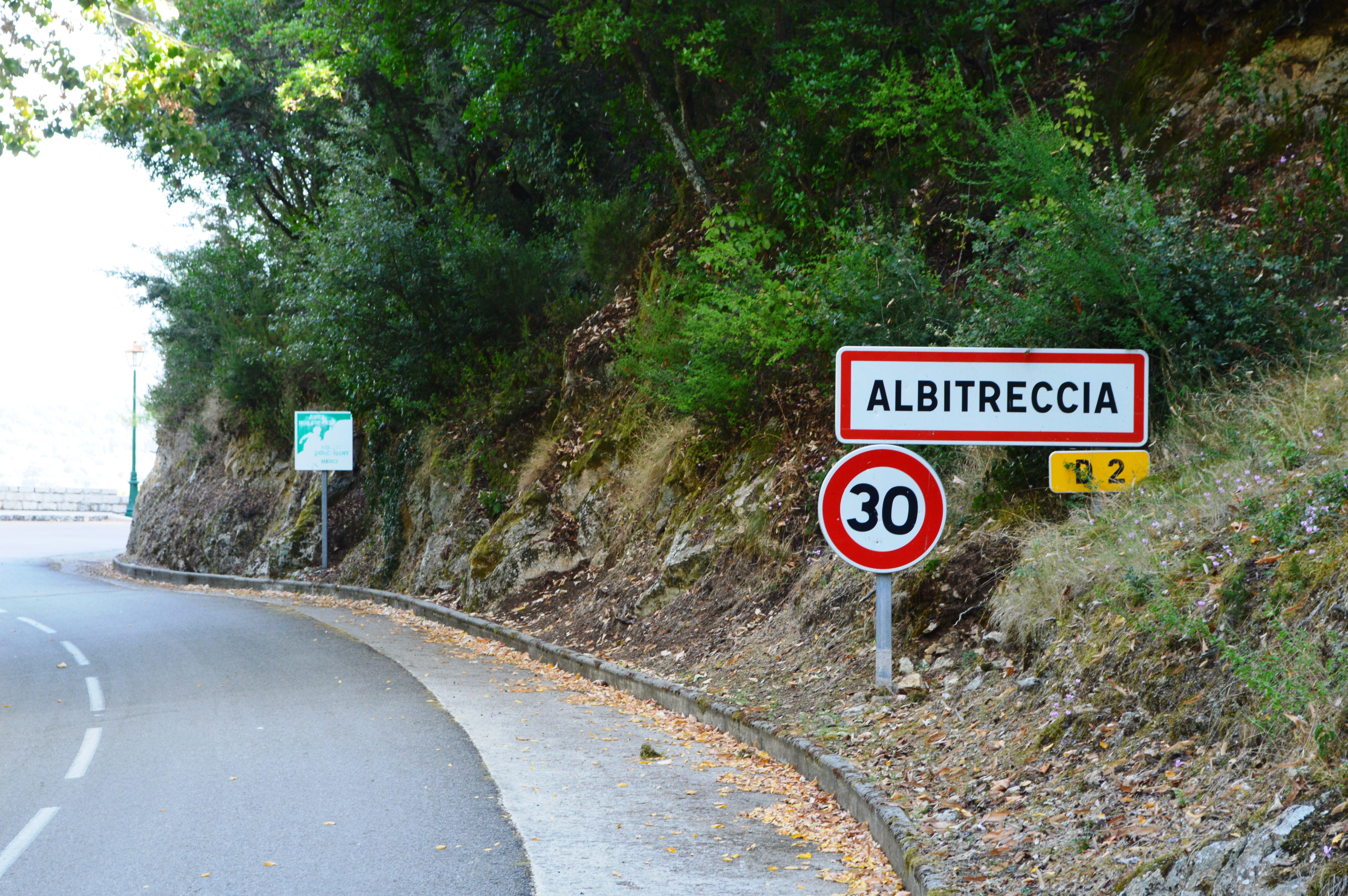
The entry to Albitreccia

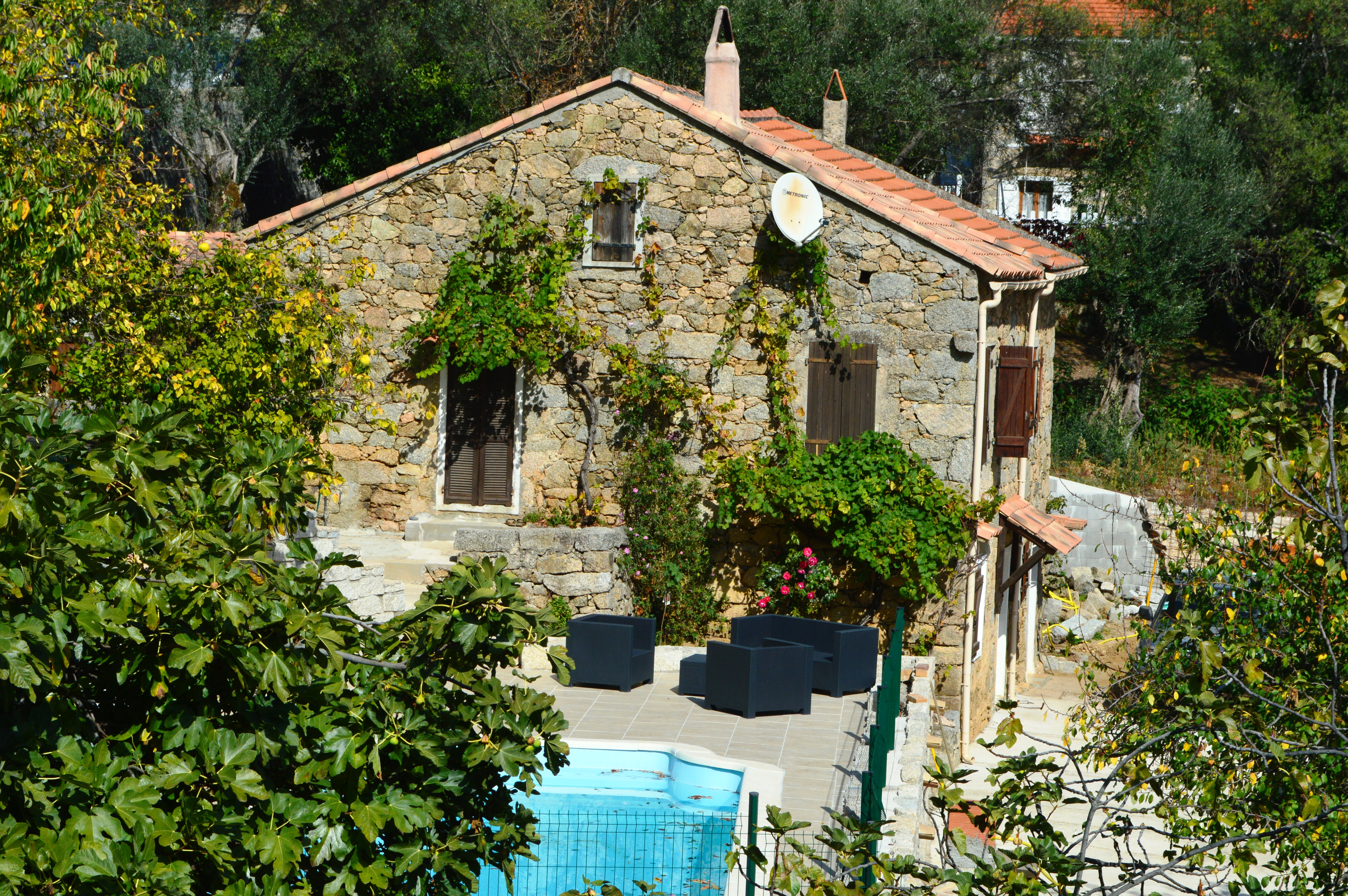
A House in Albitreccia

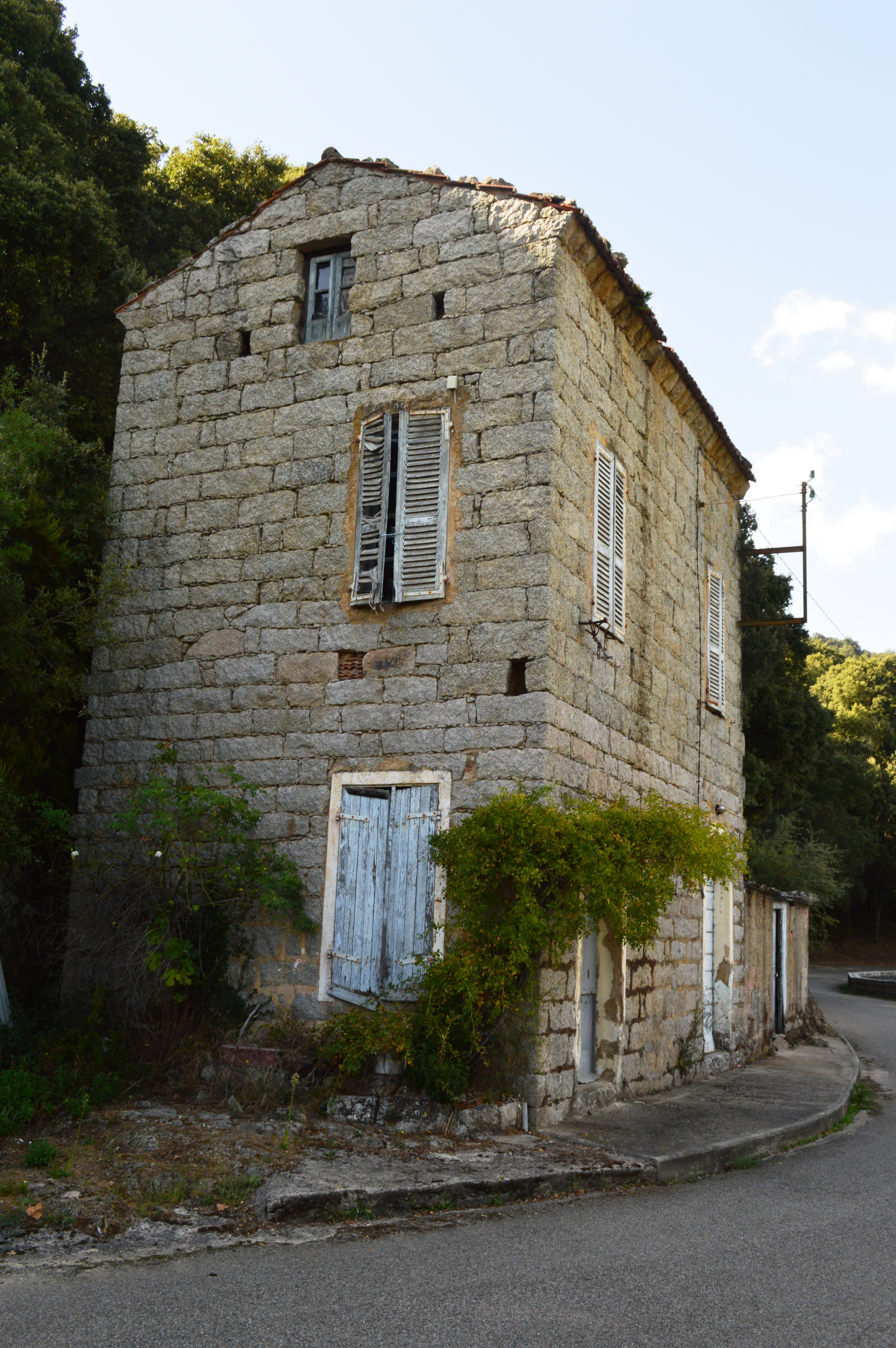
An old house in Albitreccia

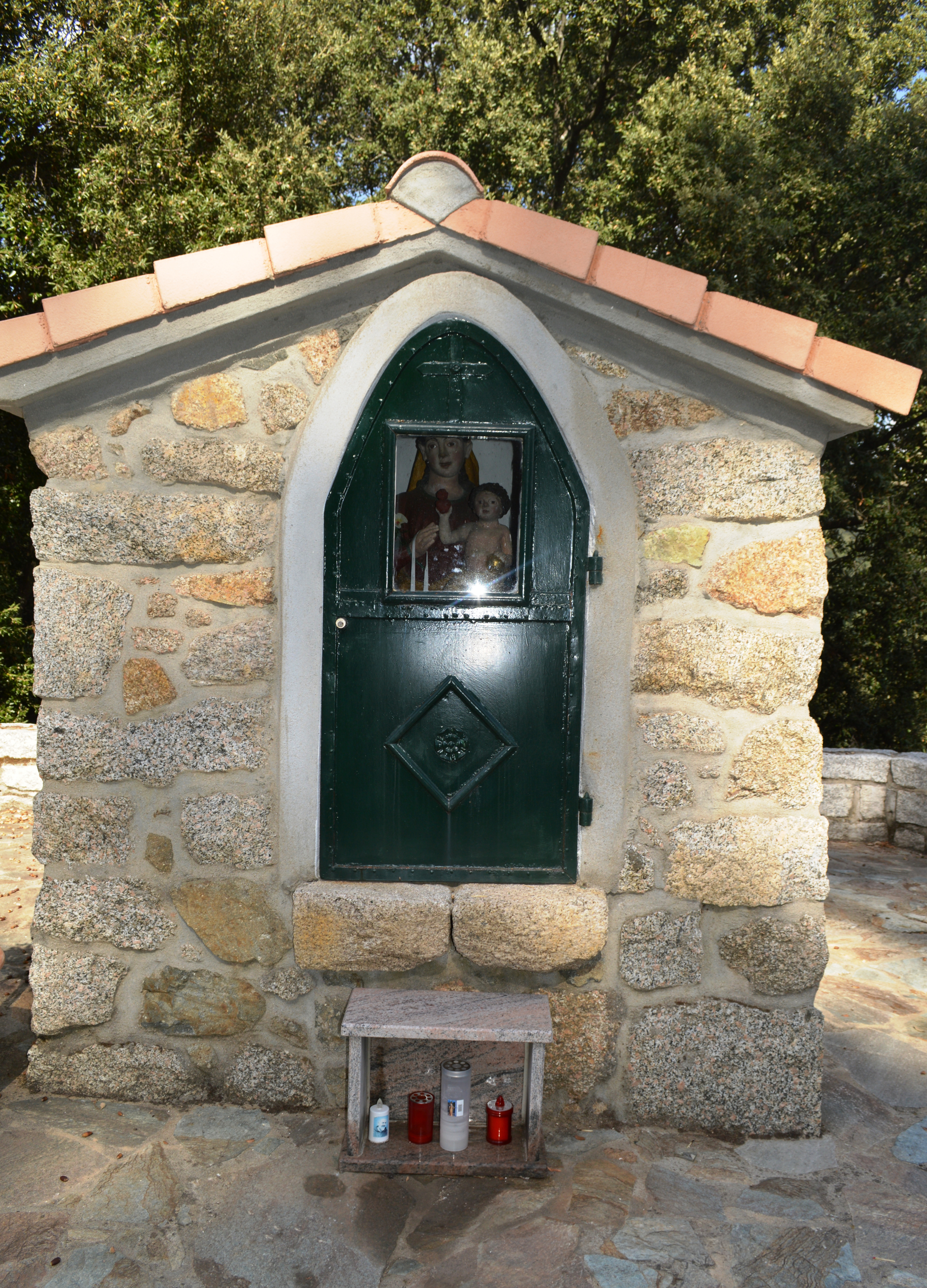
An Oratory in Albitreccia

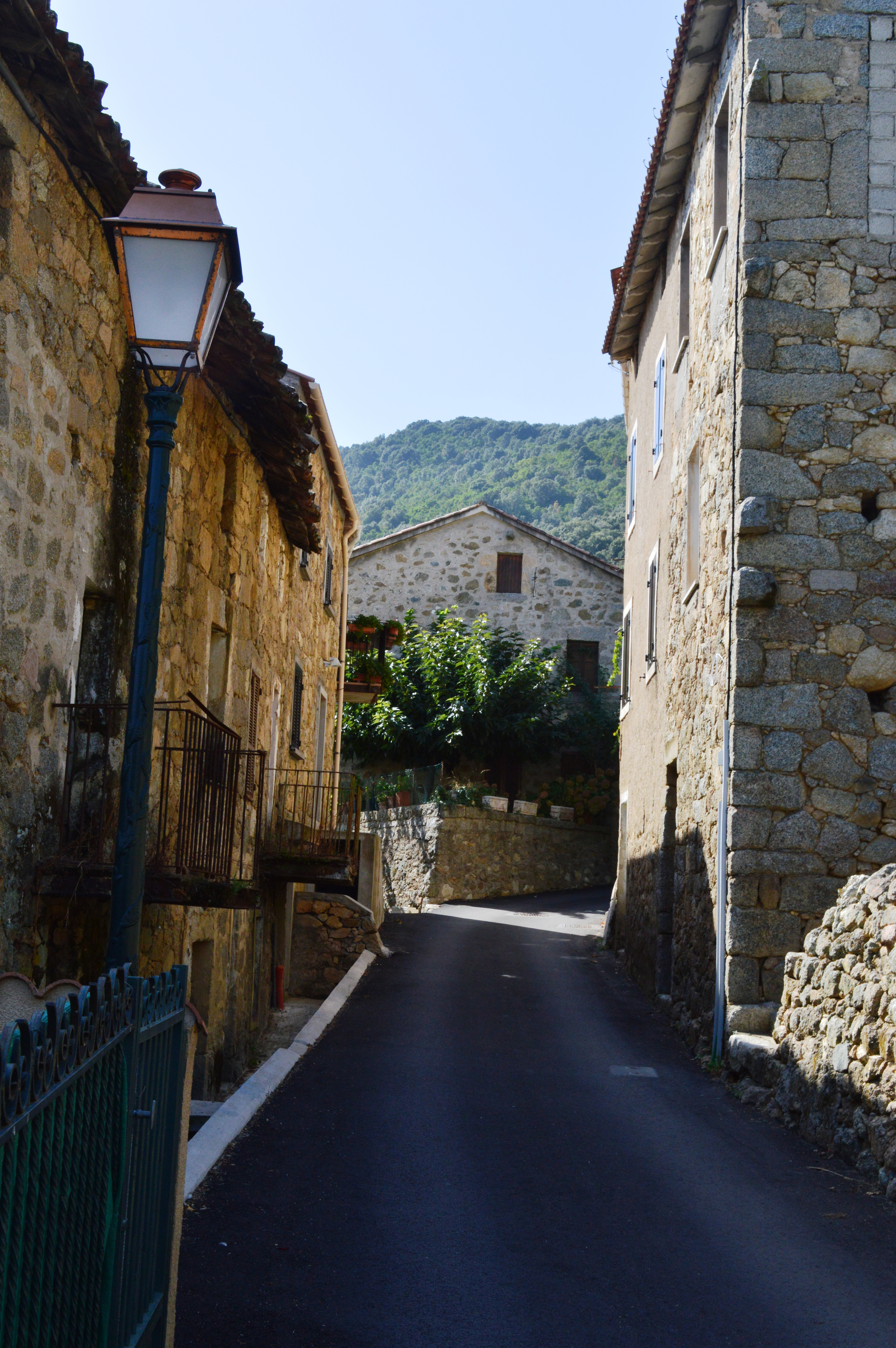
A street in Albitreccia

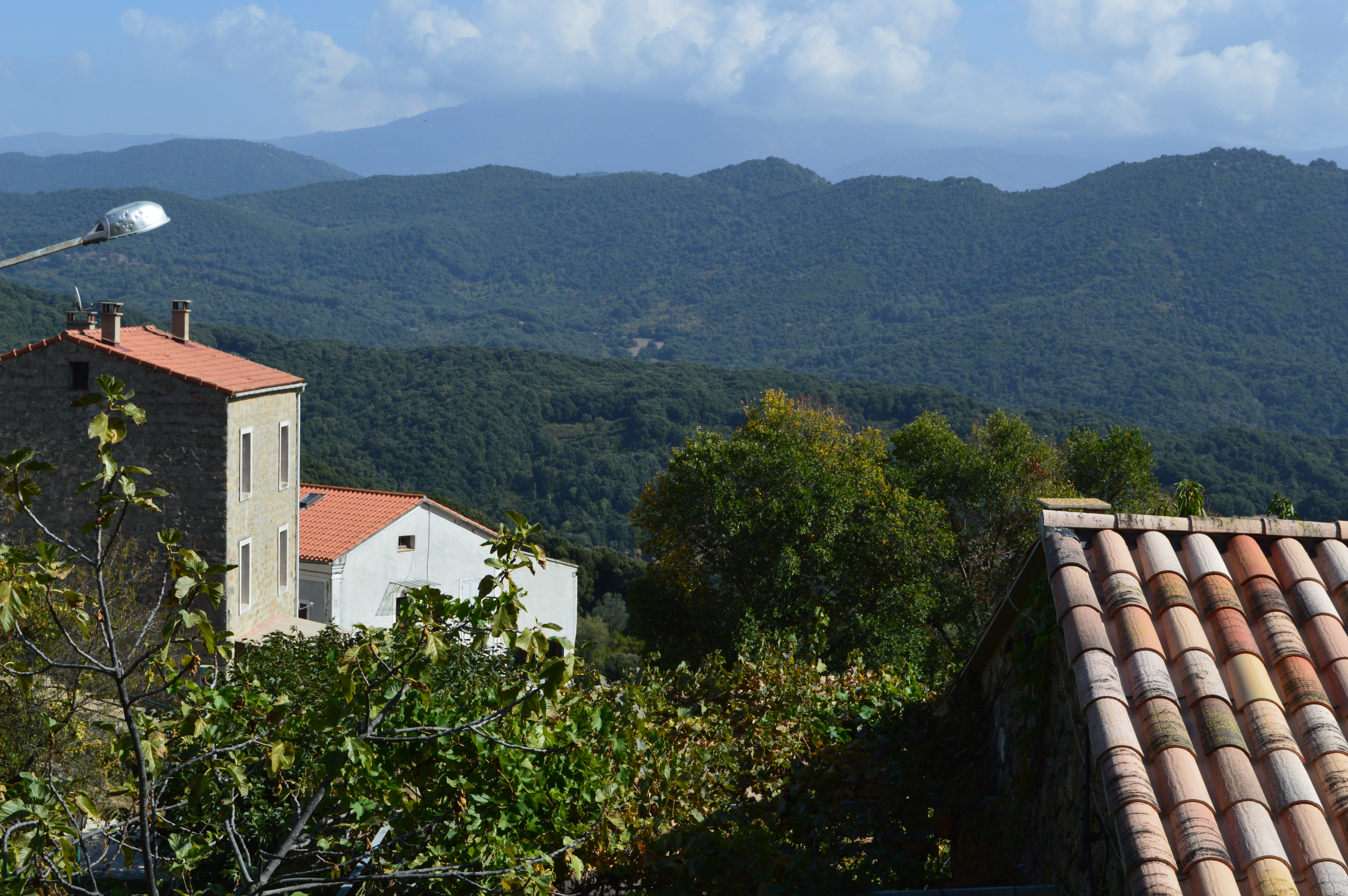
The View from Albitreccia
- Communes of the Corse-du-Sud department
