= Taravo =

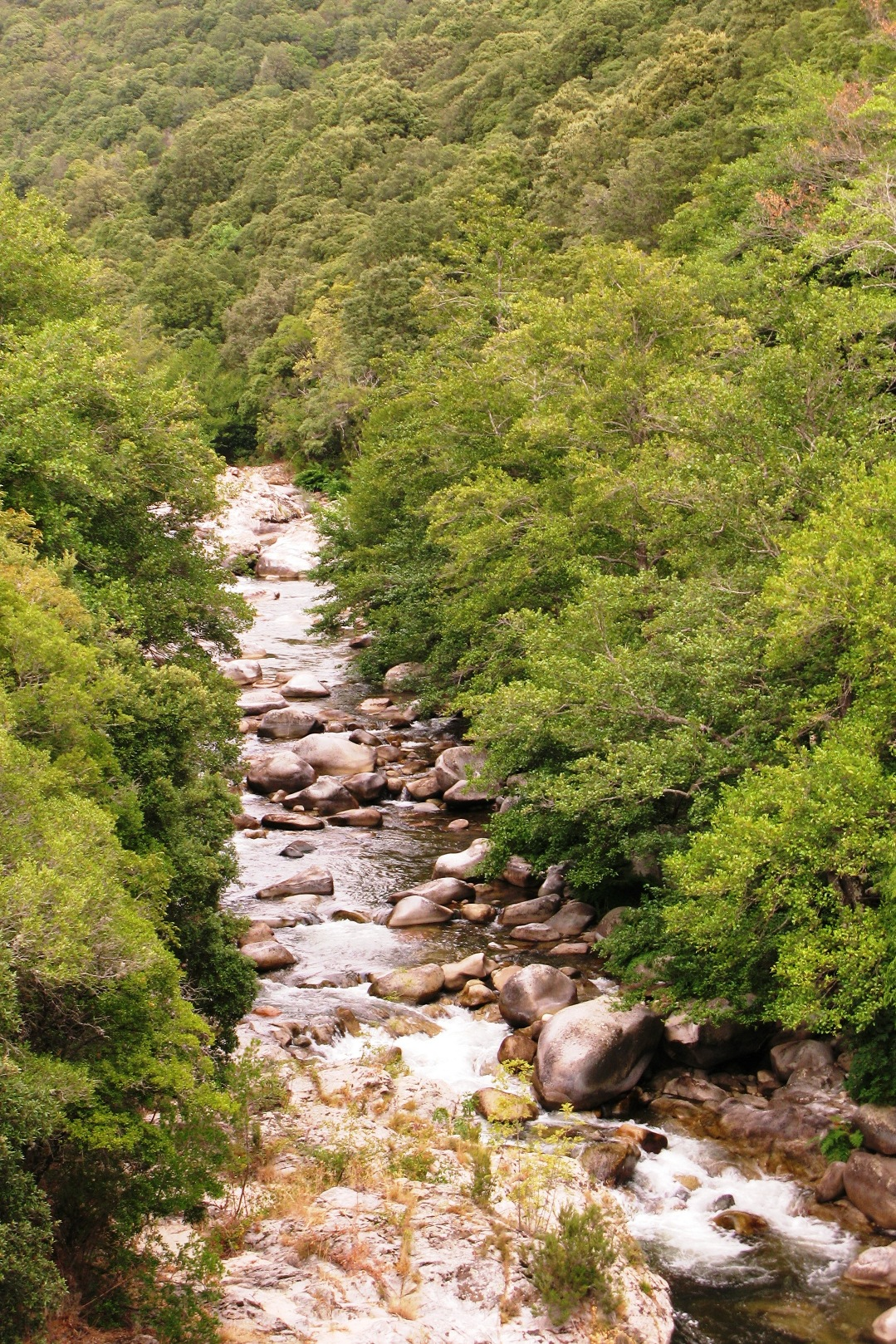

Location
- Country: France

Physical characteristics
- Source
  - location: central Corsica
- Mouth
  - location: Mediterranean Sea
  - coordinates: 41°42′28″N 8°49′41″E
- Length: 65 km (40 mi)

The Taravo (Corsican: Taravu) is a river on the island of Corsica, France. It is 65.3 km (40.6 mi) long. Its source is in the mountainous middle of the island, southeast of Monte Renoso. It flows generally southwest, through Palneca, Cozzano and Guitera-les-Bains. It ends in the Mediterranean Sea in Serra-di-Ferro, west of Propriano. Its entire course is in the Corse-du-Sud département.
