= Guargualé =

Commune in Corsica, France

- Commune
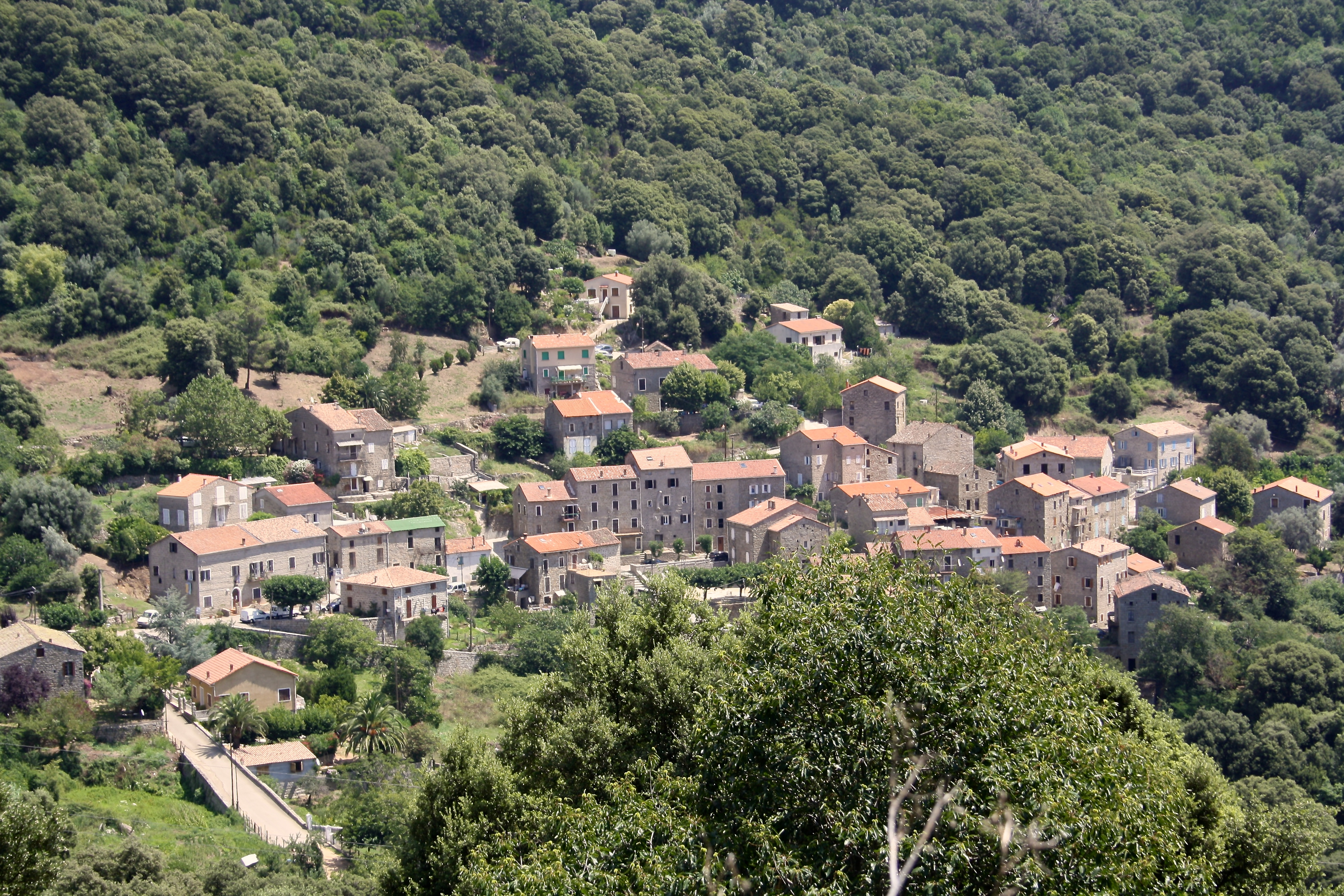
- A general view of the village
- Location of Guargualé
- Location within France Location within Corsica
- Coordinates: 41°50′13″N 8°55′39″E
- Country: France
- Region: Corsica
- Department: Corse-du-Sud
- Arrondissement: Ajaccio
- Canton: Taravo-Ornano

Government
  - Mayor (2020–2026): Paule Casanova-Nicolaï
- Area^{1}: 10.61 km^{2} (4.10 sq mi)
- Elevation: 400 m (1,300 ft)
- Highest elevation: 794 m (2,605 ft)
- Lowest elevation: 72 m (236 ft)
- Population (2023): 146
  - Density: 13.8/km^{2} (35.6/sq mi)
- Time zone: UTC+01:00 (CET)
  - Summer (DST): UTC+02:00 (CEST)
- INSEE/Postal code: 2A132 /20128
- ^{1} French Land Register data, which excludes lakes, ponds, glaciers > 1 km^{2} (0.386 sq mi or 247 acres) and river estuaries.

Guargualé (Corsican: Vargualè) is a commune in the Corse-du-Sud department of France on the island of Corsica.

== Population ==
Historical population
Year	Pop.	±% p.a.
1968	166	—
1975	146	−1.82%
1982	104	−4.73%
1990	69	−5.00%
1999	109	+5.21%
2007	120	+1.21%
2012	136	+2.53%
2017	145	+1.29%
2023	146	+0.11%
Source: INSEE

== See also ==
- Communes of the Corse-du-Sud department
