= Communes of the Corse-du-Sud department =

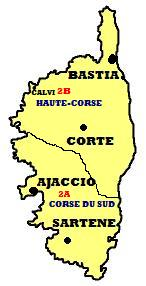

The following is a list of the 124 communes of the department of Corse-du-Sud, Corsica, France.

The communes cooperate in the following intercommunalities (as of 2025):

- Communauté d'agglomération du Pays Ajaccien
- Communauté de communes de l'Alta Rocca
- Communauté de communes Celavu-Prunelli
- Communauté de communes de la Pieve de l'Ornano et du Taravo
- Communauté de communes du Sartenais Valinco Taravo
- Communauté de communes Spelunca-Liamone
- Communauté de communes du Sud Corse

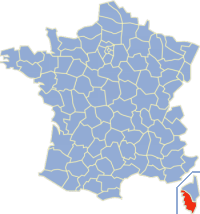

INSEE	Postal	Commune
2A001	20167	Afa
2A004	20000	Ajaccio
2A006	20167	Alata
2A008	20128	Albitreccia
2A011	20112	Altagène
2A014	20151	Ambiegna
2A017	20167	Appietto
2A018	20110	Arbellara
2A019	20160	Arbori
2A021	20140	Argiusta-Moriccio
2A022	20151	Arro
2A024	20116	Aullène
2A026	20190	Azilone-Ampaza
2A027	20121	Azzana
2A028	20160	Balogna
2A031	20119	Bastelica
2A032	20129	Bastelicaccia
2A035	20110	Belvédère-Campomoro
2A038	20100	Bilia
2A040	20136	Bocognano
2A041	20169	Bonifacio
2A048	20111	Calcatoggio
2A056	20142	Campo
2A060	20151	Cannelle
2A061	20170	Carbini
2A062	20133	Carbuccia
2A064	20190	Cardo-Torgia
2A065	20130	Cargèse
2A066	20164	Cargiaca
2A070	20111	Casaglione
2A071	20140	Casalabriva
2A085	20117	Cauro
2A089	20134	Ciamannacce
2A090	20160	Coggia
2A091	20123	Cognocoli-Monticchi
2A092	20135	Conca
2A094	20168	Corrano
2A098	20138	Coti-Chiavari
2A099	20148	Cozzano
2A100	20126	Cristinacce
2A103	20167	Cuttoli-Corticchiato
2A104	20117	Eccica-Suarella
2A108	20126	Évisa
2A114	20114	Figari
2A115	20100	Foce
2A117	20190	Forciolo
2A118	20143	Fozzano
2A119	20157	Frasseto
2A127	20100	Giuncheto
2A128	20100	Granace
2A129	20100	Grossa
2A130	20128	Grosseto-Prugna
2A131	20160	Guagno
2A132	20128	Guargualé
2A133	20153	Guitera-les-Bains
2A139	20137	Lecci
2A141	20160	Letia
2A142	20170	Levie
2A144	20139	Lopigna
2A146	20165	Loreto-di-Tallano
2A154	20141	Marignana
2A158	20112	Mela

INSEE	Postal	Commune
2A160	20140	Moca-Croce
2A163	20171	Monacia-d'Aullène
2A174	20160	Murzo
2A181	20117	Ocana
2A186	20140	Olivese
2A189	20113	Olmeto
2A191	20112	Olmiccia
2A196	20125	Orto
2A197	20147	Osani
2A198	20150	Ota
2A200	20134	Palneca
2A203	20147	Partinello
2A204	20121	Pastricciola
2A209	20167	Peri
2A211	20140	Petreto-Bicchisano
2A212	20115	Piana
2A215	20131	Pianottoli-Caldarello
2A228	20166	Pietrosella
2A232	20123	Pila-Canale
2A240	20125	Poggiolo
2A247	20137	Porto-Vecchio
2A249	20110	Propriano
2A253	20142	Quasquara
2A254	20122	Quenza
2A258	20160	Renno
2A259	20121	Rezza
2A262	20121	Rosazia
2A308	20112	Sainte-Lucie-de-Tallano
2A266	20121	Salice
2A268	20134	Sampolo
2A300	20170	San-Gavino-di-Carbini
2A310	20143	Santa-Maria-Figaniella
2A312	20190	Santa-Maria-Siché
2A295	20151	Sant'Andréa-d'Orcino
2A270	20151	Sari-d'Orcino
2A269	20145	Sari-Solenzara
2A271	20167	Sarrola-Carcopino
2A272	20100	Sartène
2A276	20140	Serra-di-Ferro
2A278	20127	Serra-di-Scopamène
2A279	20147	Serriera
2A282	20125	Soccia
2A284	20140	Sollacaro
2A285	20152	Sorbollano
2A288	20146	Sotta
2A322	20134	Tasso
2A323	20167	Tavaco
2A324	20163	Tavera
2A326	20117	Tolla
2A330	20133	Ucciani
2A331	20128	Urbalacone
2A336	20167	Valle-di-Mezzana
2A345	20172	Vero
2A348	20160	Vico
2A349	20110	Viggianello
2A351	20167	Villanova
2A357	20116	Zérubia
2A358	20173	Zévaco
2A359	20132	Zicavo
2A360	20190	Zigliara
2A362	20124	Zonza
2A363	20112	Zoza
