= Eccica-Suarella =

Commune in Corsica, France

- Commune
- Location of Eccica-Suarella
- Location within France Location within Corsica
- Coordinates: 41°55′26″N 8°54′25″E
- Country: France
- Region: Corsica
- Department: Corse-du-Sud
- Arrondissement: Ajaccio
- Canton: Taravo-Ornano

Government
  - Mayor (2020–2026): Pierre Poli
- Area^{1}: 14.47 km^{2} (5.59 sq mi)
- Elevation: 265 m (869 ft)
- Highest elevation: 544 m (1,785 ft)
- Lowest elevation: 9 m (30 ft)
- Population (2023): 1,389
  - Density: 95.99/km^{2} (248.6/sq mi)
- Time zone: UTC+01:00 (CET)
  - Summer (DST): UTC+02:00 (CEST)
- INSEE/Postal code: 2A104 /20117
- ^{1} French Land Register data, which excludes lakes, ponds, glaciers > 1 km^{2} (0.386 sq mi or 247 acres) and river estuaries.

Eccica-Suarella is a commune in the Corse-du-Sud department of France on the island of Corsica.

== Population ==
Historical population
| Year | Pop. | ±% p.a. |
|---|---|---|
| 1968 | 313 | — |
| 1975 | 329 | +0.71% |
| 1982 | 503 | +6.25% |
| 1990 | 570 | +1.58% |
| 1999 | 684 | +2.05% |
| 2007 | 862 | +2.93% |
| 2012 | 1,090 | +4.81% |
| 2017 | 1,179 | +1.58% |
| 2023 | 1,389 | +2.77% |
Source: INSEE

== See also ==
- Communes of the Corse-du-Sud department
