= Corrano =

Commune in Corsica, France

- Commune
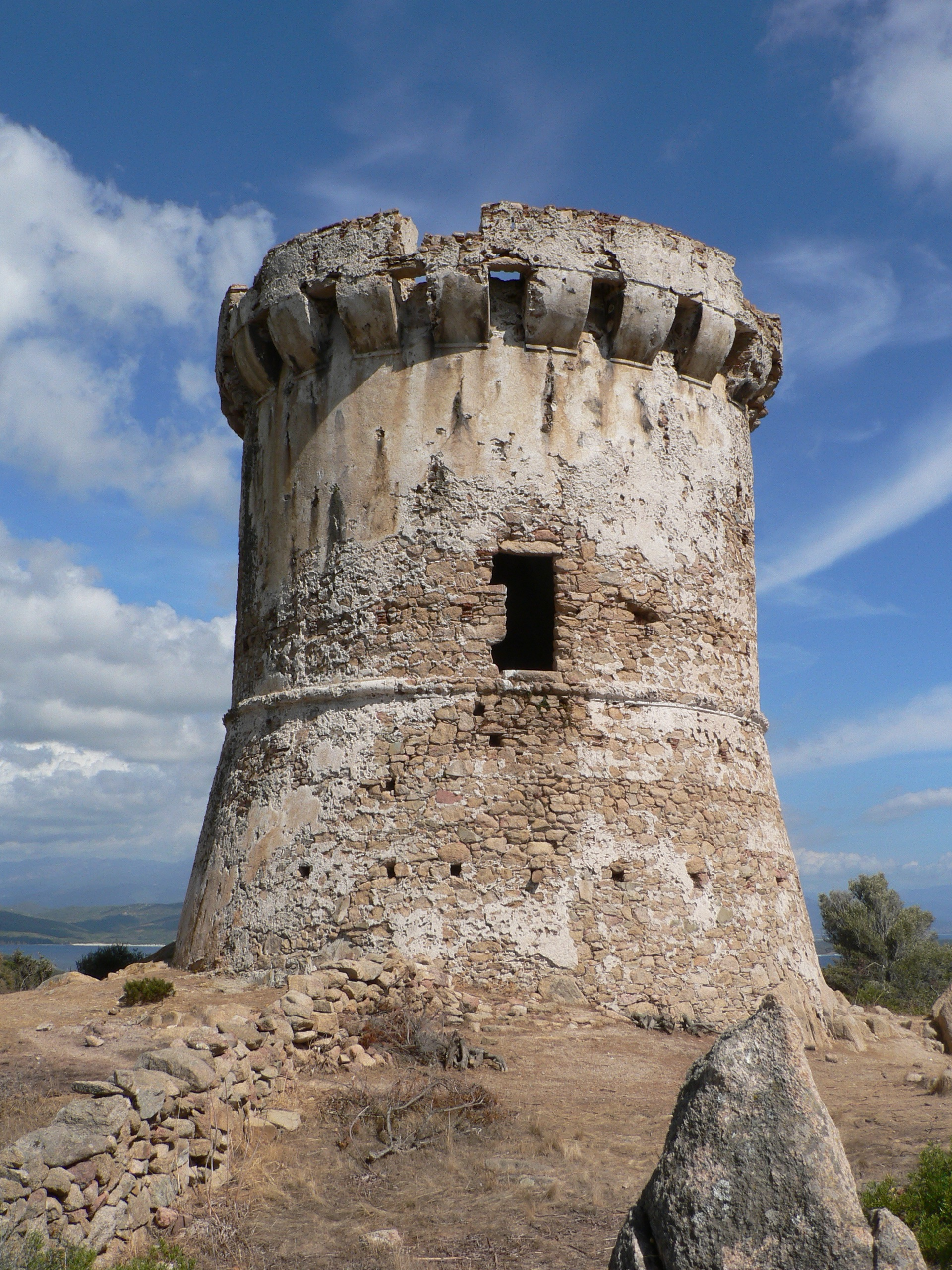
- Genoese tower
- Location of Corrano
- Location within France Location within Corsica
- Coordinates: 41°53′26″N 9°03′53″E
- Country: France
- Region: Corsica
- Department: Corse-du-Sud
- Arrondissement: Ajaccio
- Canton: Taravo-Ornano

Government
  - Mayor (2020–2026): Antoine Joseph Peraldi
- Area^{1}: 12.69 km^{2} (4.90 sq mi)
- Elevation: 450 m (1,480 ft)
- Highest elevation: 1,003 m (3,291 ft)
- Lowest elevation: 320 m (1,050 ft)
- Population (2023): 75
  - Density: 5.9/km^{2} (15/sq mi)
- Time zone: UTC+01:00 (CET)
  - Summer (DST): UTC+02:00 (CEST)
- INSEE/Postal code: 2A094 /20168
- ^{1} French Land Register data, which excludes lakes, ponds, glaciers > 1 km^{2} (0.386 sq mi or 247 acres) and river estuaries.

Corrano (French pronunciation: [kɔʁano]; Corsican: Currà) is a commune in the Corse-du-Sud department of France on the island of Corsica.

== Population ==
Historical population
Year	Pop.	±% p.a.
1968	124	—
1975	99	−3.17%
1982	78	−3.35%
1990	60	−3.23%
1999	71	+1.89%
2007	87	+2.57%
2012	86	−0.23%
2017	72	−3.49%
2023	75	+0.68%
Source: INSEE

== See also ==
- Communes of the Corse-du-Sud department
