= Campo, Corse-du-Sud =

Commune in Corsica, France

Campo
- Commune
- Location of Campo
- Location within France Location within Corsica
- Coordinates: 41°53′32″N 9°00′18″E
- Country: France
- Region: Corsica
- Department: Corse-du-Sud
- Arrondissement: Ajaccio
- Canton: Taravo-Ornano

Government
  - Mayor (2020–2026): Joseph Quilici
- Area^{1}: 3.3 km^{2} (1.3 sq mi)
- Elevation: 590 m (1,940 ft)
- Highest elevation: 1,118 m (3,668 ft)
- Lowest elevation: 493 m (1,617 ft)
- Population (2023): 102
  - Density: 31/km^{2} (80/sq mi)
- Time zone: UTC+01:00 (CET)
  - Summer (DST): UTC+02:00 (CEST)
- INSEE/Postal code: 2A056 /20110
- ^{1} French Land Register data, which excludes lakes, ponds, glaciers > 1 km^{2} (0.386 sq mi or 247 acres) and river estuaries.

Campo is a commune in the Corse-du-Sud department of France on the island of Corsica.

== Population ==
Historical population
Year	Pop.	±% p.a.
1968	140	—
1975	130	−1.05%
1982	56	−11.34%
1990	65	+1.88%
1999	77	+1.90%
2007	76	−0.16%
2012	95	+4.56%
2017	110	+2.98%
2023	102	−1.25%
Source: INSEE

== See also ==
- Communes of the Corse-du-Sud department
