= Cardo-Torgia =

Commune in Corsica, France

- Commune
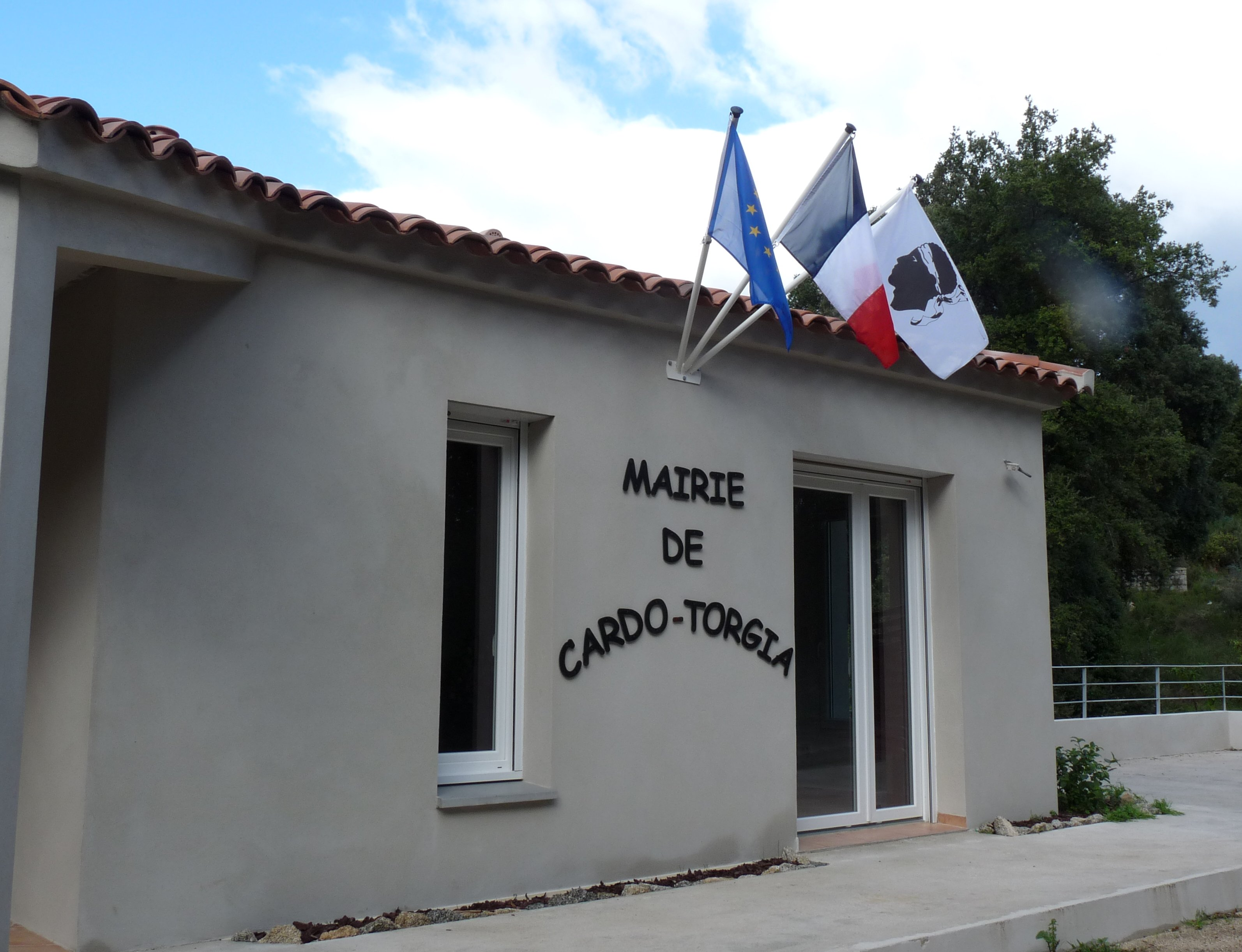
- The town hall of Cardo-Torgia
- Location of Cardo-Torgia
- Location within France Location within Corsica
- Coordinates: 41°52′10″N 8°58′46″E
- Country: France
- Region: Corsica
- Department: Corse-du-Sud
- Arrondissement: Ajaccio
- Canton: Taravo-Ornano

Government
  - Mayor (2020–2026): Nora Ettori
- Area^{1}: 3.88 km^{2} (1.50 sq mi)
- Elevation: 420 m (1,380 ft)
- Highest elevation: 680 m (2,230 ft)
- Lowest elevation: 230 m (750 ft)
- Population (2023): 32
  - Density: 8.2/km^{2} (21/sq mi)
- Time zone: UTC+01:00 (CET)
  - Summer (DST): UTC+02:00 (CEST)
- INSEE/Postal code: 2A064 /20190
- ^{1} French Land Register data, which excludes lakes, ponds, glaciers > 1 km^{2} (0.386 sq mi or 247 acres) and river estuaries.

Cardo-Torgia is a commune in the Corse-du-Sud department of France on the island of Corsica.

== Population ==
Historical population
Year	Pop.	±% p.a.
1968	67	—
1975	51	−3.82%
1982	23	−10.75%
1990	29	+2.94%
1999	32	+1.10%
2007	42	+3.46%
2012	34	−4.14%
2017	32	−1.21%
2023	32	+0.00%
Source: INSEE

== See also ==
- Communes of the Corse-du-Sud department
