= Pila-Canale =

Commune in Corsica, France

- Commune
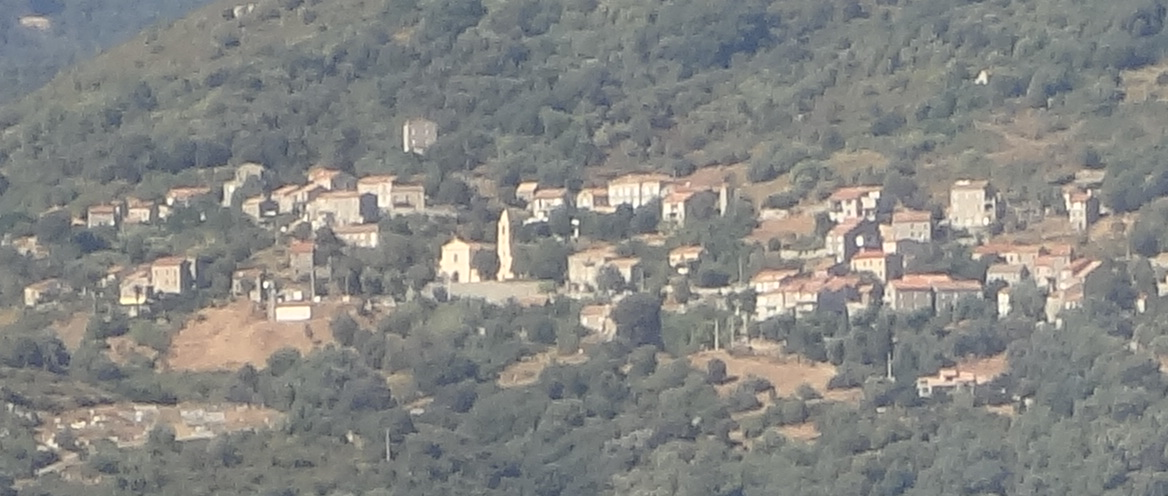
- A general view of Pila-Canale
- Location of Pila-Canale
- Location within France Location within Corsica
- Coordinates: 41°48′49″N 8°54′37″E
- Country: France
- Region: Corsica
- Department: Corse-du-Sud
- Arrondissement: Ajaccio
- Canton: Taravo-Ornano

Government
  - Mayor (2020–2026): Emmanuel Guglielmi
- Area^{1}: 18.8 km^{2} (7.3 sq mi)
- Elevation: 350 m (1,150 ft)
- Highest elevation: 561 m (1,841 ft)
- Lowest elevation: 13 m (43 ft)
- Population (2023): 271
  - Density: 14.4/km^{2} (37.3/sq mi)
- Time zone: UTC+01:00 (CET)
  - Summer (DST): UTC+02:00 (CEST)
- INSEE/Postal code: 2A232 /20123
- ^{1} French Land Register data, which excludes lakes, ponds, glaciers > 1 km^{2} (0.386 sq mi or 247 acres) and river estuaries.

Pila-Canale is a commune in the Corse-du-Sud department of France on the island of Corsica.

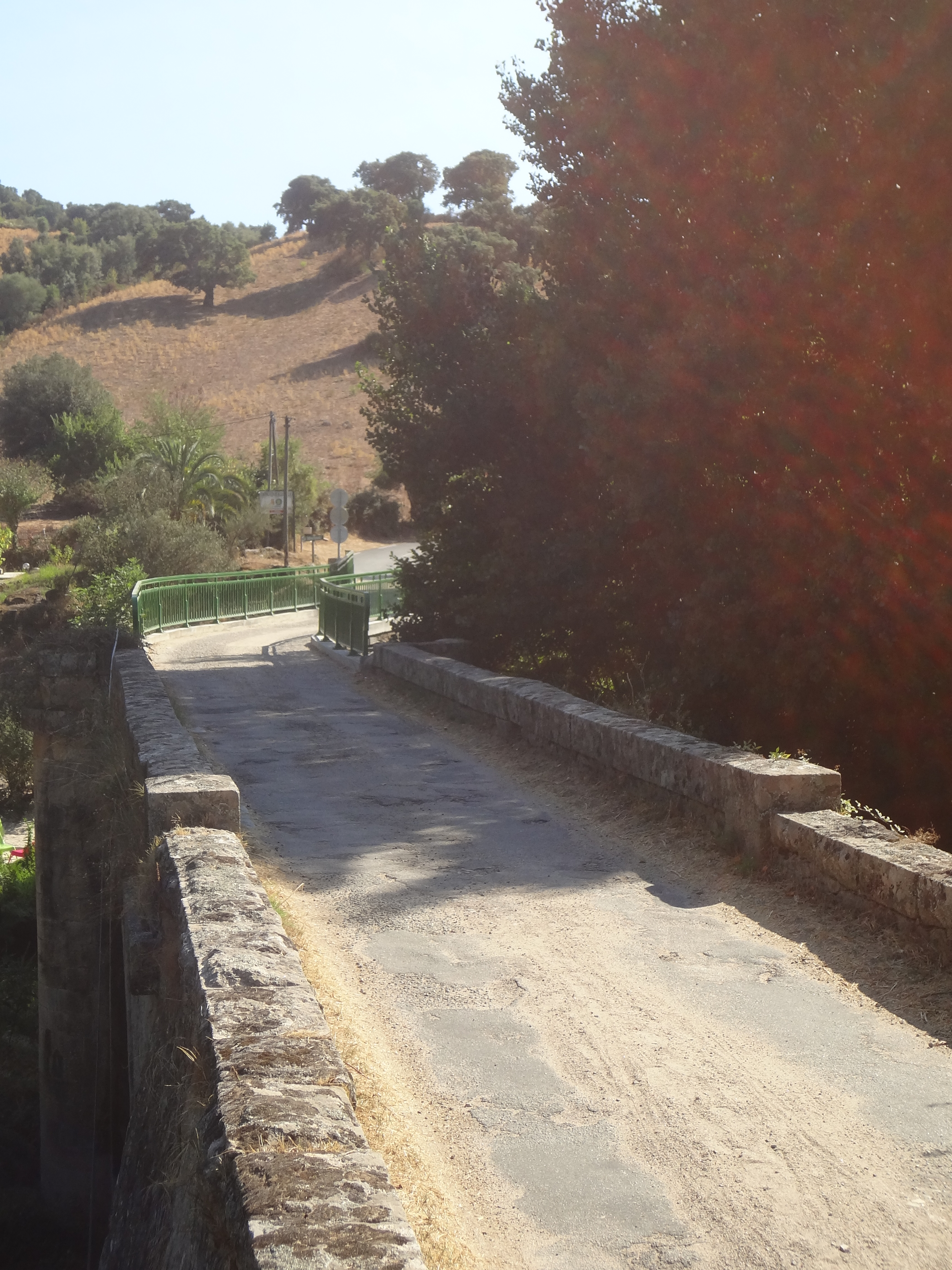
First section straight then first bend to the right.

== Geography ==
=== Climate ===
Pila-Canale has a mediterranean climate (Köppen climate classification Csa). The average annual temperature in Pila-Canale is 15.4 °C (59.7 °F). The average annual rainfall is 864.7 mm (34.04 in) with November as the wettest month. The temperatures are highest on average in August, at around 24.4 °C (75.9 °F), and lowest in January and February, at around 8.3 °C (46.9 °F). The highest temperature ever recorded in Pila-Canale was 41.4 °C (106.5 °F) on 23 July 2009; the coldest temperature ever recorded was −4.1 °C (24.6 °F) on 31 January 1999.

Climate data for Pila-Canale (1981–2010 averages, extremes 1992−present)
Month	Jan	Feb	Mar	Apr	May	Jun	Jul	Aug	Sep	Oct	Nov	Dec	Year
Record high °C (°F)	19.7 (67.5)	23.7 (74.7)	27.1 (80.8)	29.2 (84.6)	34.0 (93.2)	38.0 (100.4)	41.1 (106.0)	41.4 (106.5)	36.3 (97.3)	31.7 (89.1)	25.7 (78.3)	22.2 (72.0)	41.4 (106.5)
Mean daily maximum °C (°F)	11.5 (52.7)	11.9 (53.4)	14.3 (57.7)	16.6 (61.9)	22.0 (71.6)	26.2 (79.2)	29.8 (85.6)	29.9 (85.8)	24.9 (76.8)	20.8 (69.4)	15.6 (60.1)	12.2 (54.0)	19.7 (67.5)
Daily mean °C (°F)	8.3 (46.9)	8.3 (46.9)	10.3 (50.5)	12.6 (54.7)	17.3 (63.1)	21.0 (69.8)	24.0 (75.2)	24.4 (75.9)	20.2 (68.4)	16.9 (62.4)	12.3 (54.1)	9.2 (48.6)	15.4 (59.7)
Mean daily minimum °C (°F)	5.2 (41.4)	4.8 (40.6)	6.4 (43.5)	8.5 (47.3)	12.7 (54.9)	15.7 (60.3)	18.3 (64.9)	18.9 (66.0)	15.4 (59.7)	12.9 (55.2)	9.0 (48.2)	6.3 (43.3)	11.2 (52.2)
Record low °C (°F)	−4.1 (24.6)	−3.9 (25.0)	−2.2 (28.0)	1.2 (34.2)	4.7 (40.5)	7.0 (44.6)	11.1 (52.0)	12.9 (55.2)	8.0 (46.4)	1.8 (35.2)	−1.3 (29.7)	−2.9 (26.8)	−4.1 (24.6)
Average precipitation mm (inches)	89.7 (3.53)	57.7 (2.27)	69.9 (2.75)	73.8 (2.91)	63.1 (2.48)	29.5 (1.16)	10.9 (0.43)	27.4 (1.08)	70.8 (2.79)	106.2 (4.18)	148.8 (5.86)	116.9 (4.60)	864.7 (34.04)
Average precipitation days (≥ 1.0 mm)	8.5	7.4	7.7	8.0	6.0	3.8	1.2	2.7	6.4	8.2	10.8	10.7	81.4
Source: Météo France

=== Calzola bridge ===
The Calzola bridge, at the border with Casalabriva, has two bends seemingly due to a misalignment of the two extremities of the bridge.

== Population ==
Historical population
Year	Pop.	±% p.a.
1968	488	—
1975	408	−2.53%
1982	305	−4.07%
1990	265	−1.74%
1999	278	+0.53%
2007	282	+0.18%
2012	286	+0.28%
2017	284	−0.14%
2023	271	−0.78%
Source: INSEE

== See also ==
- Communes of the Corse-du-Sud department
