= Zévaco =

Commune in Corsica, France

- Commune
- Location of Zévaco
- Location within France Location within Corsica
- Coordinates: 41°53′36″N 9°03′00″E
- Country: France
- Region: Corsica
- Department: Corse-du-Sud
- Arrondissement: Ajaccio
- Canton: Taravo-Ornano
- Intercommunality: Pieve de l'Ornano

Government
  - Mayor (2020–2026): Jean-Baptiste Poggi
- Area^{1}: 10.04 km^{2} (3.88 sq mi)
- Elevation: 500 m (1,600 ft)
- Highest elevation: 1,289 m (4,229 ft)
- Lowest elevation: 299 m (981 ft)
- Population (2023): 50
  - Density: 5.0/km^{2} (13/sq mi)
- Demonym(s): Zévacais, Zévacaises
- Time zone: UTC+01:00 (CET)
  - Summer (DST): UTC+02:00 (CEST)
- INSEE/Postal code: 2A358 /20173
- ^{1} French Land Register data, which excludes lakes, ponds, glaciers > 1 km^{2} (0.386 sq mi or 247 acres) and river estuaries.

Zévaco (French pronunciation: [zevako]; Corsican: Zèvacu) is a commune in the Corse-du-Sud department of France on the island of Corsica.

== Population ==
Historical population

Year	Pop.	±% p.a.
1800	401	—
1806	429	+1.13%
1821	454	+0.38%
1831	402	−1.21%
1836	377	−1.28%
1841	378	+0.05%
1846	404	+1.34%
1851	402	−0.10%
1856	407	+0.25%
1861	430	+1.11%
1866	364	−3.28%
1872	362	−0.09%
1876	405	+2.85%
1881	506	+4.55%
1886	517	+0.43%
1891	509	−0.31%
1896	511	+0.08%
1901	543	+1.22%

Year	Pop.	±% p.a.
1906	549	+0.22%
1911	469	−3.10%
1921	532	+1.27%
1926	548	+0.59%
1931	578	+1.07%
1936	624	+1.54%
1946	524	−1.73%
1954	136	−15.52%
1962	105	−3.18%
1968	98	−1.14%
1975	91	−1.05%
1982	89	−0.32%
1990	57	−5.42%
1999	56	−0.20%
2007	61	+1.07%
2012	62	+0.33%
2017	59	−0.99%
2023	50	−2.72%

Source: EHESS (1793-1999) and INSEE

== See also ==
- Communes of the Corse-du-Sud department
