= Canton of Taravo-Ornano =

Coordinates: 41.87°N 8.96°E

The canton of Taravo-Ornano (French: canton de Taravo-Ornano, Corsican: cantone di Taravu è Ornanu) is an administrative division of the Corse-du-Sud department, Corsica, France. It was created at the French canton reorganisation which came into effect in March 2015. Its seat is in Grosseto-Prugna.

It consists of the following communes:

1. Albitreccia
2. Argiusta-Moriccio
3. Azilone-Ampaza
4. Campo
5. Cardo-Torgia
6. Casalabriva
7. Cauro
8. Ciamannacce
9. Cognocoli-Monticchi
10. Corrano
11. Coti-Chiavari
12. Cozzano
13. Eccica-Suarella
14. Forciolo
15. Frasseto
16. Grosseto-Prugna
17. Guargualé
18. Guitera-les-Bains
19. Moca-Croce
20. Olivese
21. Palneca
22. Petreto-Bicchisano
23. Pietrosella
24. Pila-Canale
25. Quasquara
26. Sampolo
27. Santa-Maria-Siché
28. Serra-di-Ferro
29. Sollacaro
30. Tasso
31. Urbalacone
32. Zévaco
33. Zicavo
34. Zigliara
