= Zigliara =

Commune in Corsica, France

- Commune
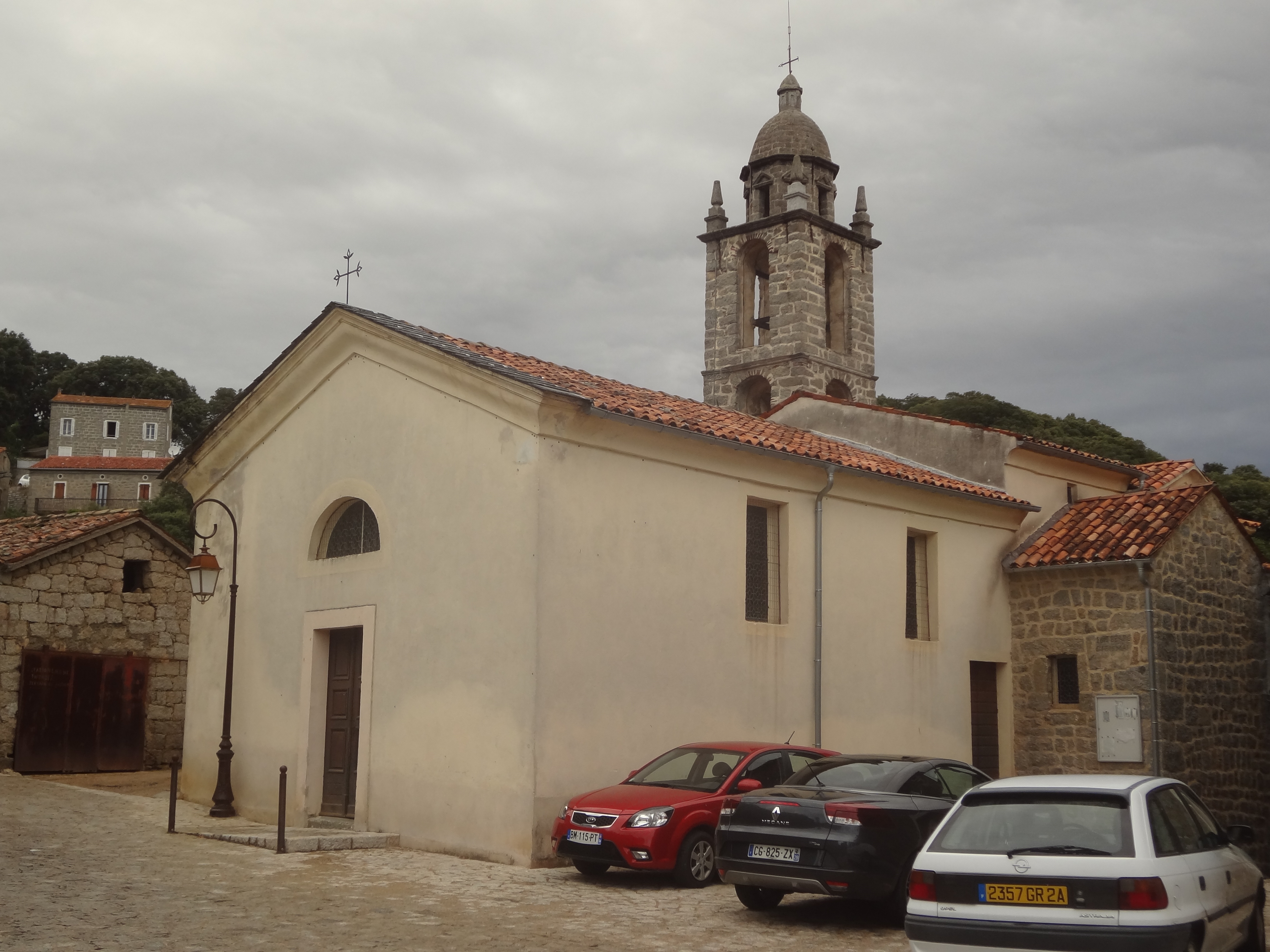
- The church in Zigliara
- Location of Zigliara
- Location within France Location within Corsica
- Coordinates: 41°50′51″N 8°59′40″E
- Country: France
- Region: Corsica
- Department: Corse-du-Sud
- Arrondissement: Ajaccio
- Canton: Taravo-Ornano
- Intercommunality: Pieve de l'Ornano

Government
  - Mayor (2020–2026): Gérard Trombetta
- Area^{1}: 12.85 km^{2} (4.96 sq mi)
- Elevation: 433 m (1,421 ft)
- Highest elevation: 682 m (2,238 ft)
- Lowest elevation: 129 m (423 ft)
- Population (2023): 127
  - Density: 9.88/km^{2} (25.6/sq mi)
- Demonym(s): Zigliarais, Zigliaraises
- Time zone: UTC+01:00 (CET)
  - Summer (DST): UTC+02:00 (CEST)
- INSEE/Postal code: 2A360 /20190
- ^{1} French Land Register data, which excludes lakes, ponds, glaciers > 1 km^{2} (0.386 sq mi or 247 acres) and river estuaries.

Zigliara is a commune in the Corse-du-Sud department of France on the island of Corsica.

== Population ==
Historical population

Year	Pop.	±% p.a.
1800	519	—
1806	507	−0.39%
1821	544	+0.47%
1831	498	−0.88%
1836	530	+1.25%
1841	538	+0.30%
1846	544	+0.22%
1851	589	+1.60%
1856	575	−0.48%
1861	627	+1.75%
1866	554	−2.45%
1872	541	−0.39%
1876	556	+0.69%
1881	619	+2.17%
1886	618	−0.03%
1891	562	−1.88%
1896	608	+1.59%
1901	616	+0.26%

Year	Pop.	±% p.a.
1906	624	+0.26%
1911	620	−0.13%
1921	616	−0.06%
1926	623	+0.23%
1931	524	−3.40%
1936	597	+2.64%
1946	535	−1.09%
1954	553	+0.41%
1962	260	−9.00%
1968	242	−1.19%
1975	229	−0.79%
1982	232	+0.19%
1990	142	−5.95%
1999	125	−1.41%
2007	137	+1.15%
2012	139	+0.29%
2017	130	−1.33%
2023	127	−0.39%

Source: EHESS (1793–1999) and INSEE

== See also ==
- Communes of the Corse-du-Sud department
