= Ciamannacce =

Commune in Corsica, France

- Commune
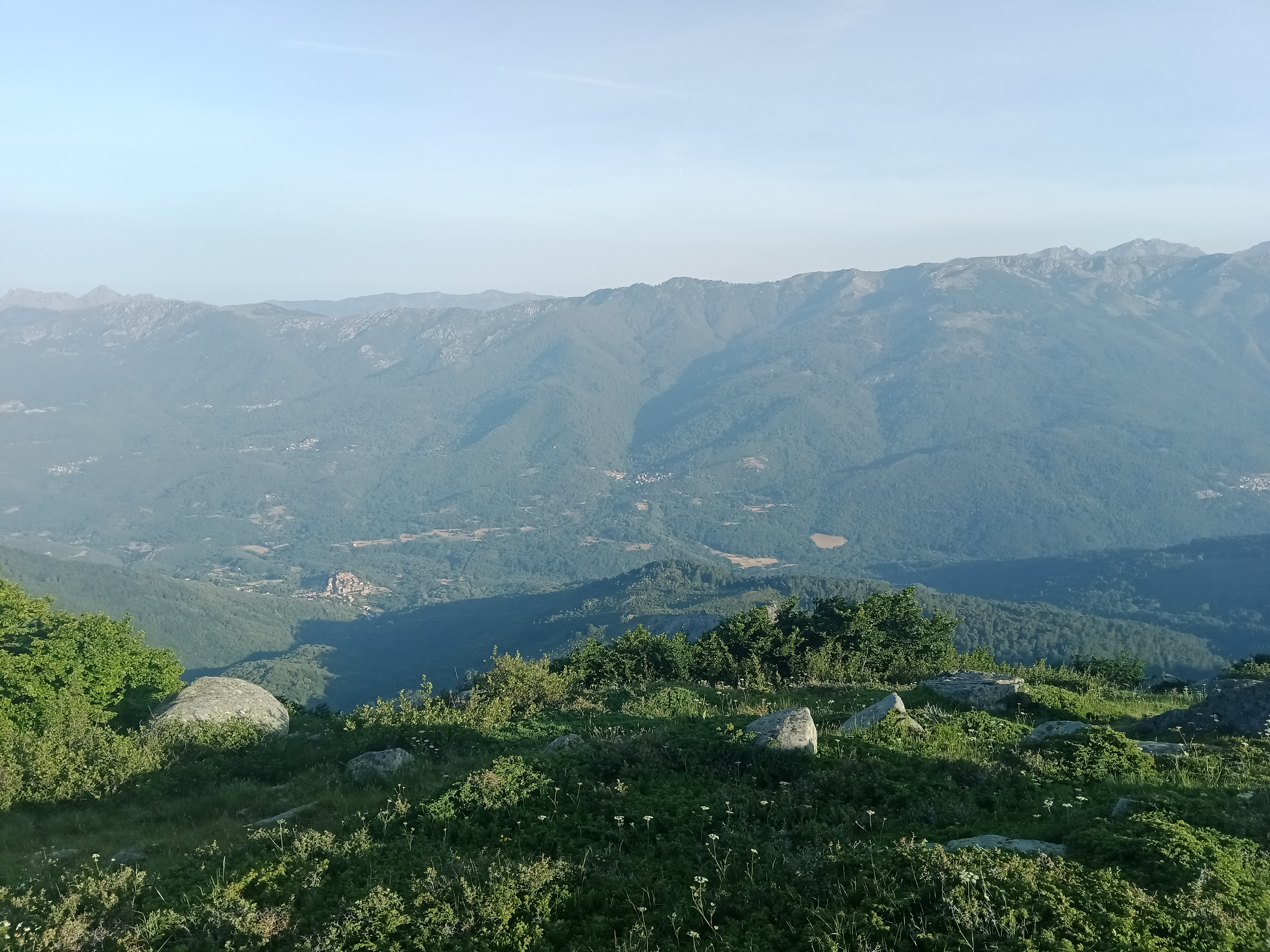
- Location of Ciamannacce
- Location within France Location within Corsica
- Coordinates: 41°57′10″N 9°08′54″E
- Country: France
- Region: Corsica
- Department: Corse-du-Sud
- Arrondissement: Ajaccio
- Canton: Taravo-Ornano

Government
  - Mayor (2020–2026): Ange Venturelli
- Area^{1}: 25.11 km^{2} (9.70 sq mi)
- Elevation: 780 m (2,560 ft)
- Highest elevation: 1,950 m (6,400 ft)
- Lowest elevation: 540 m (1,770 ft)
- Population (2023): 129
  - Density: 5.14/km^{2} (13.3/sq mi)
- Time zone: UTC+01:00 (CET)
  - Summer (DST): UTC+02:00 (CEST)
- INSEE/Postal code: 2A089 /20134
- ^{1} French Land Register data, which excludes lakes, ponds, glaciers > 1 km^{2} (0.386 sq mi or 247 acres) and river estuaries.

Ciamannacce is a commune in the Corse-du-Sud department of France on the island of Corsica.

== Population ==
Historical population
Year	Pop.	±% p.a.
1968	160	—
1975	132	−2.71%
1982	115	−1.95%
1990	93	−2.62%
1999	134	+4.14%
2007	131	−0.28%
2012	137	+0.90%
2017	133	−0.59%
2023	129	−0.51%
Source: INSEE

== See also ==
- Communes of the Corse-du-Sud department
