= Tasso, Corse-du-Sud =

Commune in Corsica, France

Tasso
- Commune
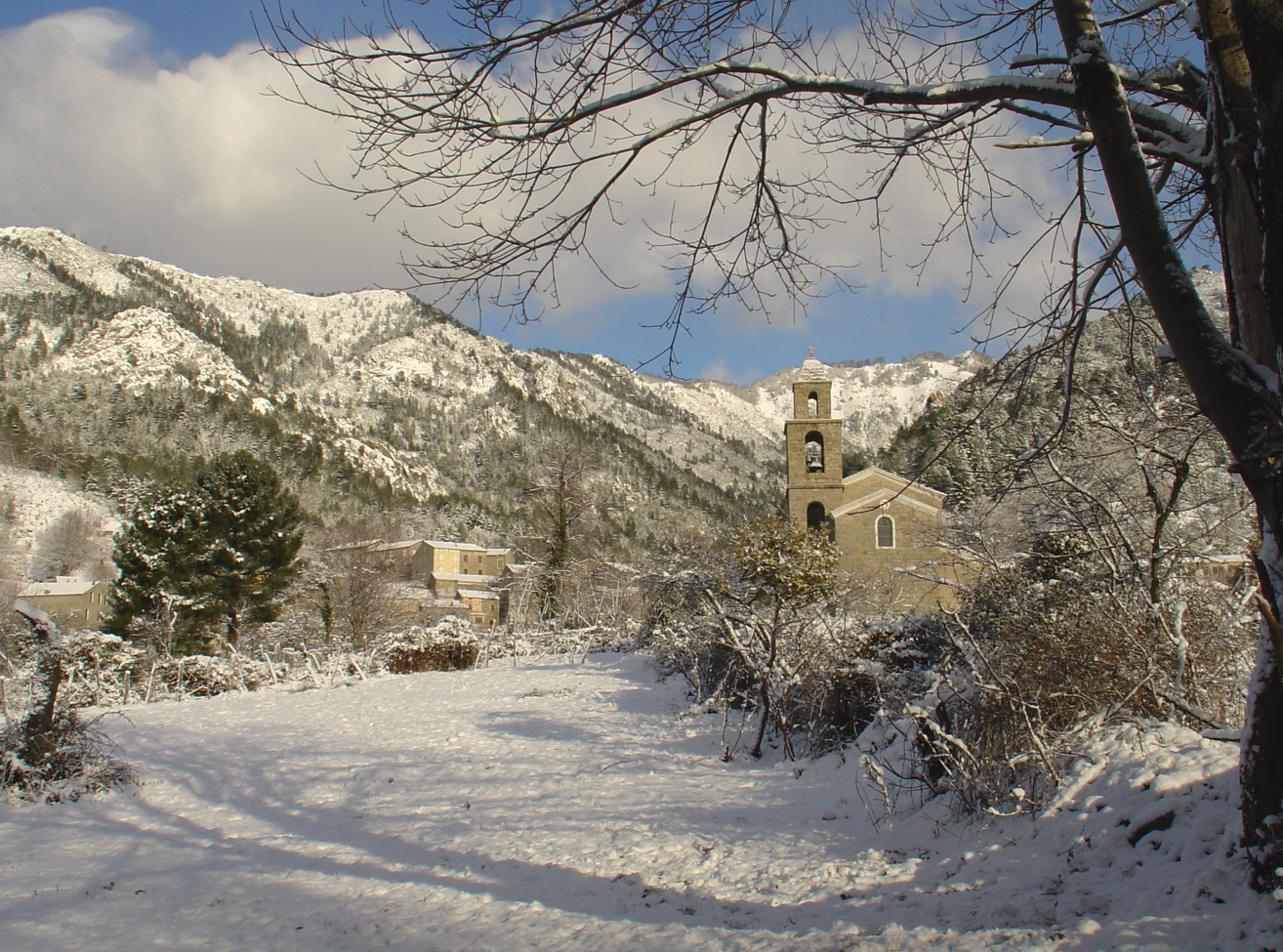
- Location of Tasso
- Location within France Location within Corsica
- Coordinates: 41°56′44″N 9°06′18″E
- Country: France
- Region: Corsica
- Department: Corse-du-Sud
- Arrondissement: Ajaccio
- Canton: Taravo-Ornano

Government
  - Mayor (2020–2026): Marthe Tomi
- Area^{1}: 16.67 km^{2} (6.44 sq mi)
- Elevation: 850 m (2,790 ft)
- Highest elevation: 1,720 m (5,640 ft)
- Lowest elevation: 497 m (1,631 ft)
- Population (2023): 89
  - Density: 5.3/km^{2} (14/sq mi)
- Time zone: UTC+01:00 (CET)
  - Summer (DST): UTC+02:00 (CEST)
- INSEE/Postal code: 2A322 /20134
- ^{1} French Land Register data, which excludes lakes, ponds, glaciers > 1 km^{2} (0.386 sq mi or 247 acres) and river estuaries.

Tasso (French pronunciation: [taso]; Corsican: Tassu) is a commune in the Corse-du-Sud department of France on the island of Corsica.

== Population ==
Historical population
Year	Pop.	±% p.a.
1968	137	—
1975	134	−0.32%
1982	122	−1.33%
1990	91	−3.60%
1999	97	+0.71%
2007	95	−0.26%
2012	89	−1.30%
2017	110	+4.33%
2023	89	−3.47%
Source: INSEE

== See also ==
- Communes of the Corse-du-Sud department
