= Quasquara =

Commune in Corsica, France

- Commune
- Location of Quasquara
- Location within France Location within Corsica
- Coordinates: 41°54′05″N 9°00′41″E
- Country: France
- Region: Corsica
- Department: Corse-du-Sud
- Arrondissement: Ajaccio
- Canton: Taravo-Ornano
- Intercommunality: CC de la Pieve de l'Ornano et du Taravo

Government
  - Mayor (2020–2026): Paul-Antoine Bertolozzi
- Area^{1}: 6.11 km^{2} (2.36 sq mi)
- Elevation: 720 m (2,360 ft)
- Highest elevation: 1,446 m (4,744 ft)
- Lowest elevation: 627 m (2,057 ft)
- Population (2023): 66
  - Density: 11/km^{2} (28/sq mi)
- Time zone: UTC+01:00 (CET)
  - Summer (DST): UTC+02:00 (CEST)
- INSEE/Postal code: 2A253 /20142
- ^{1} French Land Register data, which excludes lakes, ponds, glaciers > 1 km^{2} (0.386 sq mi or 247 acres) and river estuaries.

Quasquara (French pronunciation: [kwaskwaʁa]; Corsican: Quàsquara) is a commune in the Corse-du-Sud department of France on the island of Corsica.

== Population ==
Historical population
Year	Pop.	±% p.a.
1968	71	—
1975	67	−0.82%
1982	56	−2.53%
1990	46	−2.43%
1999	50	+0.93%
2007	56	+1.43%
2012	53	−1.10%
2017	51	−0.77%
2023	66	+4.39%
Source: INSEE

== See also ==
- Communes of the Corse-du-Sud department
