= Forciolo =

Commune in Corsica, France

- Commune
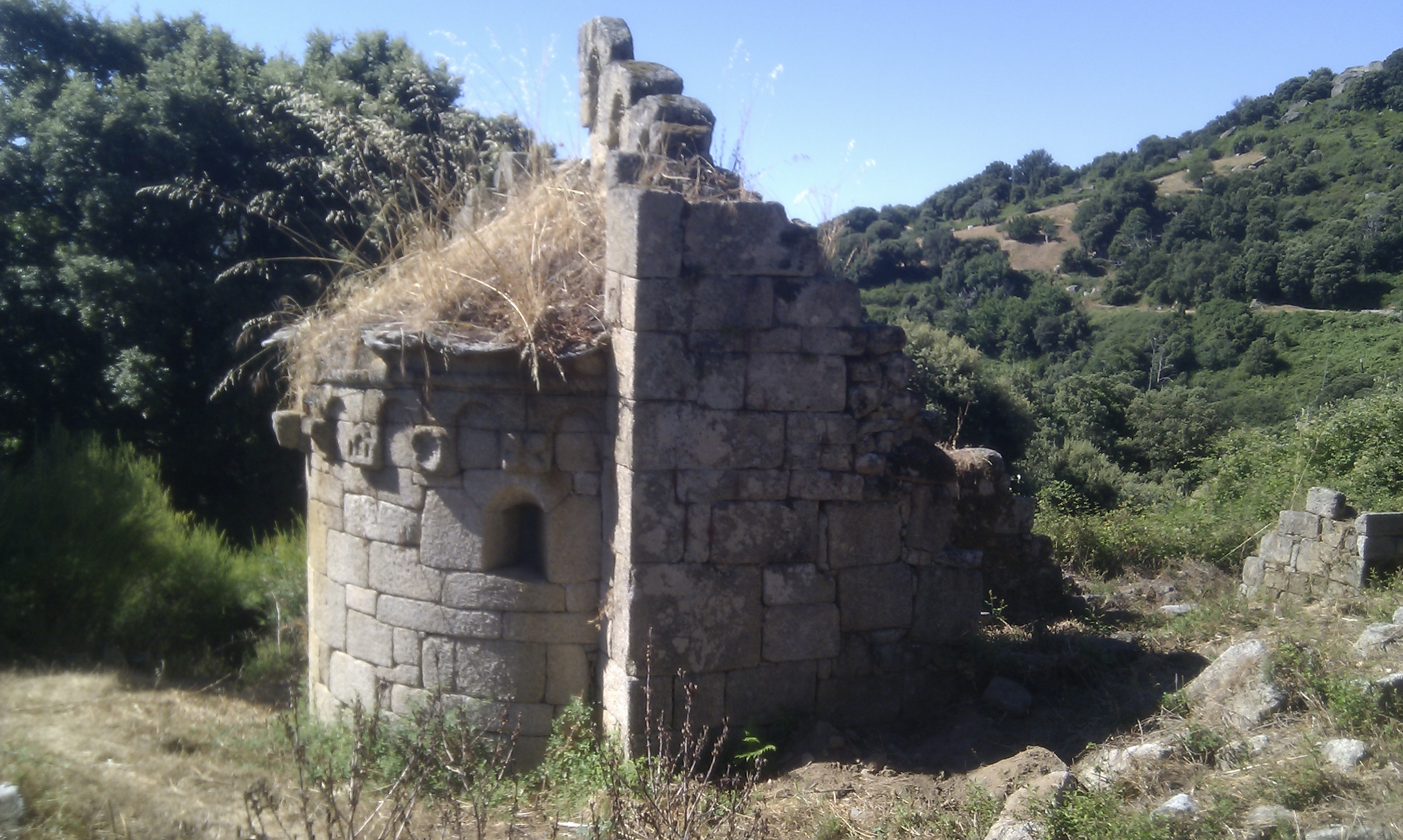
- The chapel of San Petru di Panacali, in Forciolo
- Location of Forciolo
- Location within France Location within Corsica
- Coordinates: 41°51′18″N 9°00′36″E
- Country: France
- Region: Corsica
- Department: Corse-du-Sud
- Arrondissement: Ajaccio
- Canton: Taravo-Ornano

Government
  - Mayor (2020–2026): Rémi Casanova
- Area^{1}: 6.88 km^{2} (2.66 sq mi)
- Elevation: 300 m (980 ft)
- Highest elevation: 753 m (2,470 ft)
- Lowest elevation: 231 m (758 ft)
- Population (2023): 93
  - Density: 14/km^{2} (35/sq mi)
- Time zone: UTC+01:00 (CET)
  - Summer (DST): UTC+02:00 (CEST)
- INSEE/Postal code: 2A117 /20190
- ^{1} French Land Register data, which excludes lakes, ponds, glaciers > 1 km^{2} (0.386 sq mi or 247 acres) and river estuaries.

Forciolo is a commune in the Corse-du-Sud department of France on the island of Corsica.

== Population ==
Historical population
Year	Pop.	±% p.a.
1968	132	—
1975	106	−3.09%
1982	75	−4.82%
1990	56	−3.59%
1999	69	+2.35%
2007	76	+1.22%
2012	66	−2.78%
2017	81	+4.18%
2023	93	+2.33%
Source: INSEE

== See also ==
- Communes of the Corse-du-Sud department
