= Frasseto =

Commune in Corsica, France

- Commune
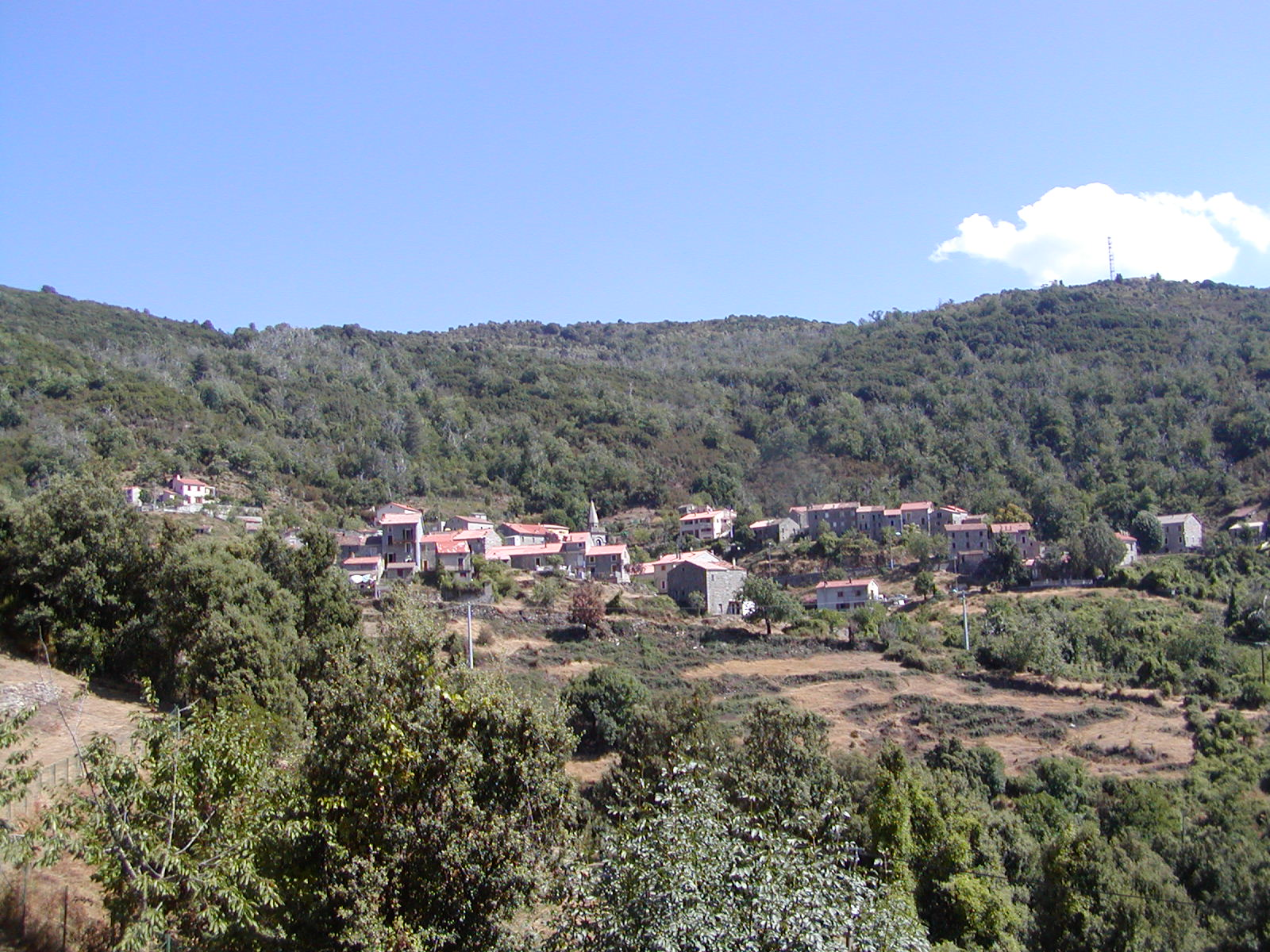
- The village of Frasseto
- Location of Frasseto
- Location within France Location within Corsica
- Coordinates: 41°53′49″N 9°01′22″E
- Country: France
- Region: Corsica
- Department: Corse-du-Sud
- Arrondissement: Ajaccio
- Canton: Taravo-Ornano

Government
  - Mayor (2020–2026): Paul Antona
- Area^{1}: 16.61 km^{2} (6.41 sq mi)
- Elevation: 720 m (2,360 ft)
- Highest elevation: 1,680 m (5,510 ft)
- Lowest elevation: 529 m (1,736 ft)
- Population (2023): 134
  - Density: 8.07/km^{2} (20.9/sq mi)
- Time zone: UTC+01:00 (CET)
  - Summer (DST): UTC+02:00 (CEST)
- INSEE/Postal code: 2A119 /20157
- ^{1} French Land Register data, which excludes lakes, ponds, glaciers > 1 km^{2} (0.386 sq mi or 247 acres) and river estuaries.

Frasseto is a commune in the Corse-du-Sud department of France on the island of Corsica.

== Population ==
Historical population
Year	Pop.	±% p.a.
1968	178	—
1975	129	−4.50%
1982	64	−9.53%
1990	67	+0.57%
1999	82	+2.27%
2007	124	+5.31%
2012	122	−0.32%
2017	122	+0.00%
2023	134	+1.58%
Source: INSEE

== See also ==
- Communes of the Corse-du-Sud department
