= Urbalacone =

Commune in Corsica, France

- Commune
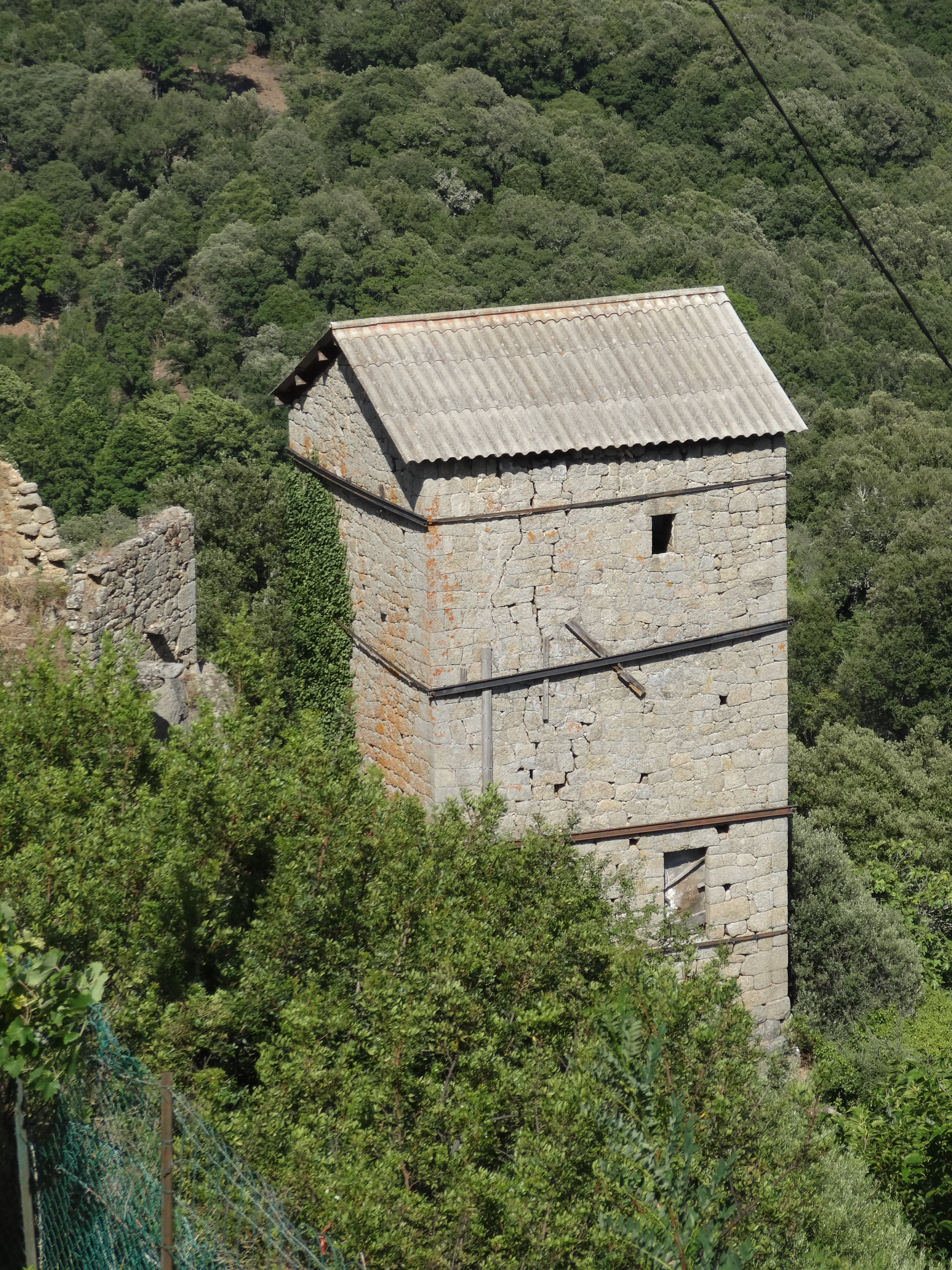
- Location of Urbalacone
- Location within France Location within Corsica
- Coordinates: 41°50′16″N 8°56′56″E
- Country: France
- Region: Corsica
- Department: Corse-du-Sud
- Arrondissement: Ajaccio
- Canton: Taravo-Ornano

Government
  - Mayor (2020–2026): François Casanova
- Area^{1}: 8.25 km^{2} (3.19 sq mi)
- Elevation: 323 m (1,060 ft)
- Highest elevation: 693 m (2,274 ft)
- Lowest elevation: 91 m (299 ft)
- Population (2023): 65
  - Density: 7.9/km^{2} (20/sq mi)
- Time zone: UTC+01:00 (CET)
  - Summer (DST): UTC+02:00 (CEST)
- INSEE/Postal code: 2A331 /20128
- ^{1} French Land Register data, which excludes lakes, ponds, glaciers > 1 km^{2} (0.386 sq mi or 247 acres) and river estuaries.

Urbalacone (Corsican: Urbalacò) is a commune in the French department of Corse-du-Sud on the island of Corsica.

== Population ==
Historical population
Year	Pop.	±% p.a.
1968	104	—
1975	86	−2.68%
1982	71	−2.70%
1990	63	−1.48%
1999	68	+0.85%
2007	63	−0.95%
2012	71	+2.42%
2017	65	−1.75%
2023	65	+0.00%
Source: INSEE

== See also ==
- Communes of the Corse-du-Sud department
