= Moca-Croce =

Commune in Corsica, France

- Commune
- Location of Moca-Croce
- Location within France Location within Corsica
- Coordinates: 41°48′33″N 9°00′47″E
- Country: France
- Region: Corsica
- Department: Corse-du-Sud
- Arrondissement: Sartène
- Canton: Taravo-Ornano

Government
  - Mayor (2020–2026): Patrice Simon Istria
- Area^{1}: 27.75 km^{2} (10.71 sq mi)
- Elevation: 420 m (1,380 ft)
- Highest elevation: 1,387 m (4,551 ft)
- Lowest elevation: 139 m (456 ft)
- Population (2023): 221
  - Density: 7.96/km^{2} (20.6/sq mi)
- Time zone: UTC+01:00 (CET)
  - Summer (DST): UTC+02:00 (CEST)
- INSEE/Postal code: 2A160 /20140
- ^{1} French Land Register data, which excludes lakes, ponds, glaciers > 1 km^{2} (0.386 sq mi or 247 acres) and river estuaries.

Moca-Croce is a commune in the Corse-du-Sud department of France on the island of Corsica.

== Population ==
Historical population
Year	Pop.	±% p.a.
1968	254	—
1975	247	−0.40%
1982	211	−2.23%
1990	207	−0.24%
1999	221	+0.73%
2007	227	+0.34%
2012	232	+0.44%
2017	252	+1.67%
2023	221	−2.16%
Source: INSEE

== See also ==
- Communes of the Corse-du-Sud department
