= Cauro =

Commune in Corsica, France

- Commune
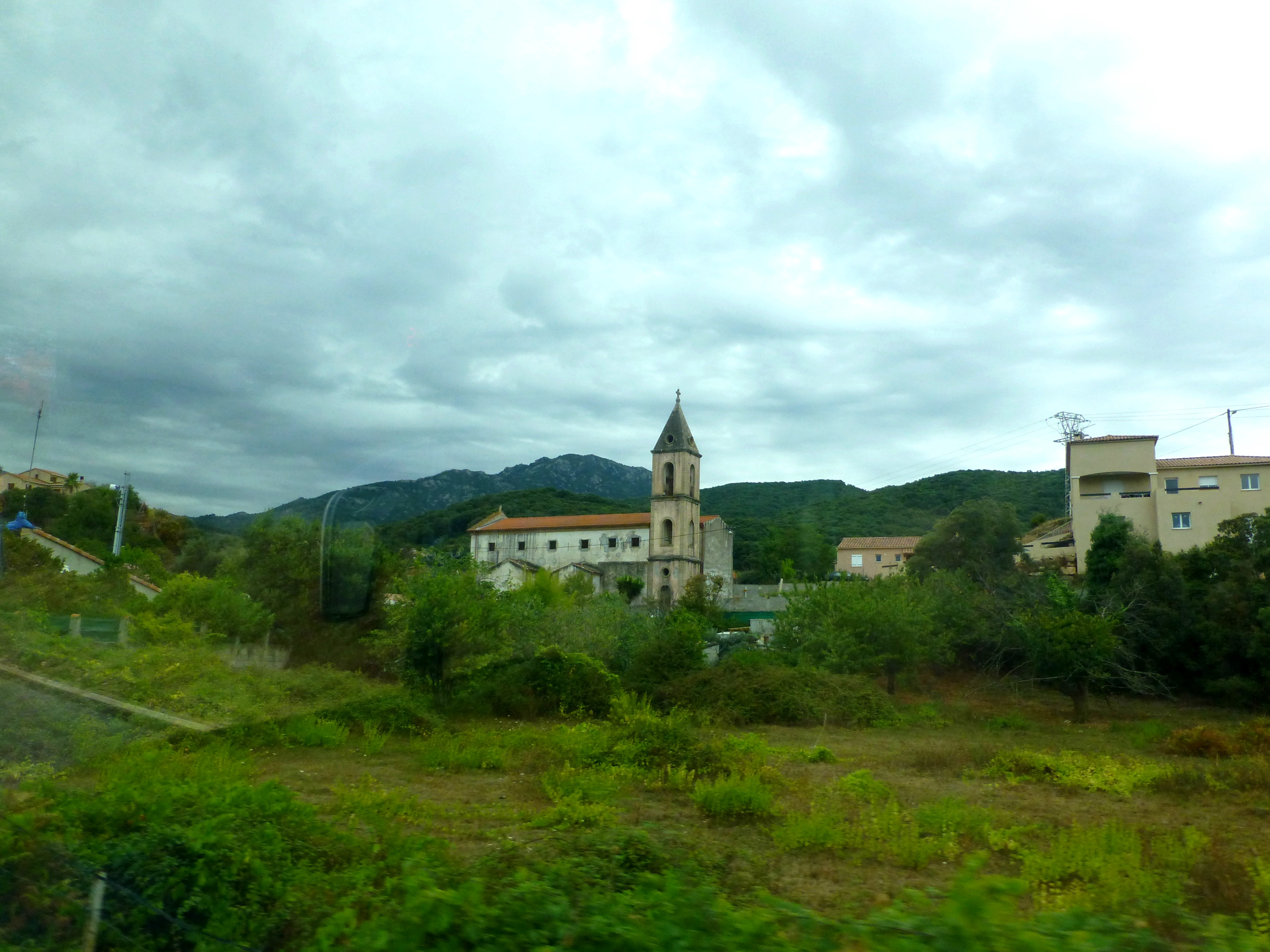
- Location of Cauro
- Location within France Location within Corsica
- Coordinates: 41°55′04″N 8°54′52″E
- Country: France
- Region: Corsica
- Department: Corse-du-Sud
- Arrondissement: Ajaccio
- Canton: Taravo-Ornano

Government
  - Mayor (2020–2026): Pascal Leccia
- Area^{1}: 27.9 km^{2} (10.8 sq mi)
- Elevation: 370 m (1,210 ft)
- Highest elevation: 1,161 m (3,809 ft)
- Lowest elevation: 11 m (36 ft)
- Population (2023): 1,486
  - Density: 53.3/km^{2} (138/sq mi)
- Time zone: UTC+01:00 (CET)
  - Summer (DST): UTC+02:00 (CEST)
- INSEE/Postal code: 2A085 /20117
- ^{1} French Land Register data, which excludes lakes, ponds, glaciers > 1 km^{2} (0.386 sq mi or 247 acres) and river estuaries.

Cauro (French pronunciation: [koʁo]; Corsican: Cavru) is a commune in the Corse-du-Sud department of France on the island of Corsica.

== Population ==
Historical population
Year	Pop.	±% p.a.
1968	559	—
1975	563	+0.10%
1982	595	+0.79%
1990	849	+4.54%
1999	1,060	+2.50%
2007	1,264	+2.22%
2012	1,311	+0.73%
2017	1,444	+1.95%
2023	1,486	+0.48%
Source: INSEE

== See also ==
- Communes of the Corse-du-Sud department
