= Sampolo =

Commune in Corsica, France

- Commune
- Coat of arms
- Location of Sampolo
- Location within France Location within Corsica
- Coordinates: 41°56′35″N 9°07′27″E
- Country: France
- Region: Corsica
- Department: Corse-du-Sud
- Arrondissement: Ajaccio
- Canton: Taravo-Ornano

Government
  - Mayor (2023–2026): Marie-Jacqueline Santi
- Area^{1}: 7.14 km^{2} (2.76 sq mi)
- Elevation: 800 m (2,600 ft)
- Highest elevation: 1,720 m (5,640 ft)
- Lowest elevation: 532 m (1,745 ft)
- Population (2023): 90
  - Density: 13/km^{2} (33/sq mi)
- Time zone: UTC+01:00 (CET)
  - Summer (DST): UTC+02:00 (CEST)
- INSEE/Postal code: 2A268 /20134
- ^{1} French Land Register data, which excludes lakes, ponds, glaciers > 1 km^{2} (0.386 sq mi or 247 acres) and river estuaries.

Sampolo is a commune in the Corse-du-Sud department of France on the island of Corsica.

== Geography ==
=== Climate ===
Sampolo has a mediterranean climate (Köppen climate classification Csa). The average annual temperature in Sampolo is 13.1 °C (55.6 °F). The average annual rainfall is 1,260.4 mm (49.62 in) with November as the wettest month. The temperatures are highest on average in August, at around 22.4 °C (72.3 °F), and lowest in February, at around 5.7 °C (42.3 °F). The highest temperature ever recorded in Sampolo was 38.8 °C (101.8 °F) on 1 August 2017; the coldest temperature ever recorded was −8.0 °C (17.6 °F) on 31 January 1999.

Climate data for Sampolo (1991−2020 normals, extremes 1990−present)
Month	Jan	Feb	Mar	Apr	May	Jun	Jul	Aug	Sep	Oct	Nov	Dec	Year
Record high °C (°F)	20.2 (68.4)	21.4 (70.5)	25.5 (77.9)	27.5 (81.5)	32.2 (90.0)	34.7 (94.5)	38.1 (100.6)	38.8 (101.8)	33.4 (92.1)	30.0 (86.0)	24.5 (76.1)	21.0 (69.8)	38.8 (101.8)
Mean daily maximum °C (°F)	9.1 (48.4)	9.5 (49.1)	12.1 (53.8)	14.7 (58.5)	19.1 (66.4)	23.5 (74.3)	27.0 (80.6)	27.5 (81.5)	22.6 (72.7)	18.5 (65.3)	13.0 (55.4)	9.9 (49.8)	17.2 (63.0)
Daily mean °C (°F)	5.7 (42.3)	5.7 (42.3)	8.1 (46.6)	10.5 (50.9)	14.7 (58.5)	18.9 (66.0)	21.9 (71.4)	22.4 (72.3)	18.0 (64.4)	14.5 (58.1)	9.6 (49.3)	6.6 (43.9)	13.1 (55.6)
Mean daily minimum °C (°F)	2.2 (36.0)	1.9 (35.4)	4.0 (39.2)	6.3 (43.3)	10.3 (50.5)	14.2 (57.6)	16.8 (62.2)	17.3 (63.1)	13.3 (55.9)	10.4 (50.7)	6.2 (43.2)	3.3 (37.9)	8.9 (48.0)
Record low °C (°F)	−8.0 (17.6)	−6.9 (19.6)	−6.2 (20.8)	−2.6 (27.3)	0.7 (33.3)	3.5 (38.3)	7.9 (46.2)	9.7 (49.5)	4.9 (40.8)	−0.1 (31.8)	−4.3 (24.3)	−6.5 (20.3)	−8.0 (17.6)
Average precipitation mm (inches)	122.1 (4.81)	105.7 (4.16)	114.9 (4.52)	108.1 (4.26)	88.7 (3.49)	61.3 (2.41)	32.6 (1.28)	28.9 (1.14)	90.7 (3.57)	123.7 (4.87)	201.7 (7.94)	182.0 (7.17)	1,260.4 (49.62)
Average precipitation days (≥ 1.0 mm)	10.1	9.3	9.6	11.1	8.1	5.8	3.4	2.9	7.7	9.6	11.9	11.4	100.9
Source: Météo France

== Population ==
Historical population
Year	Pop.	±% p.a.
1968	154	—
1975	136	−1.76%
1982	82	−6.97%
1990	49	−6.23%
1999	52	+0.66%
2007	57	+1.15%
2012	58	+0.35%
2017	80	+6.64%
2023	90	+1.98%
Source: INSEE

== See also ==
- Communes of the Corse-du-Sud department
