= Casalabriva =

Commune in Corsica, France

- Commune
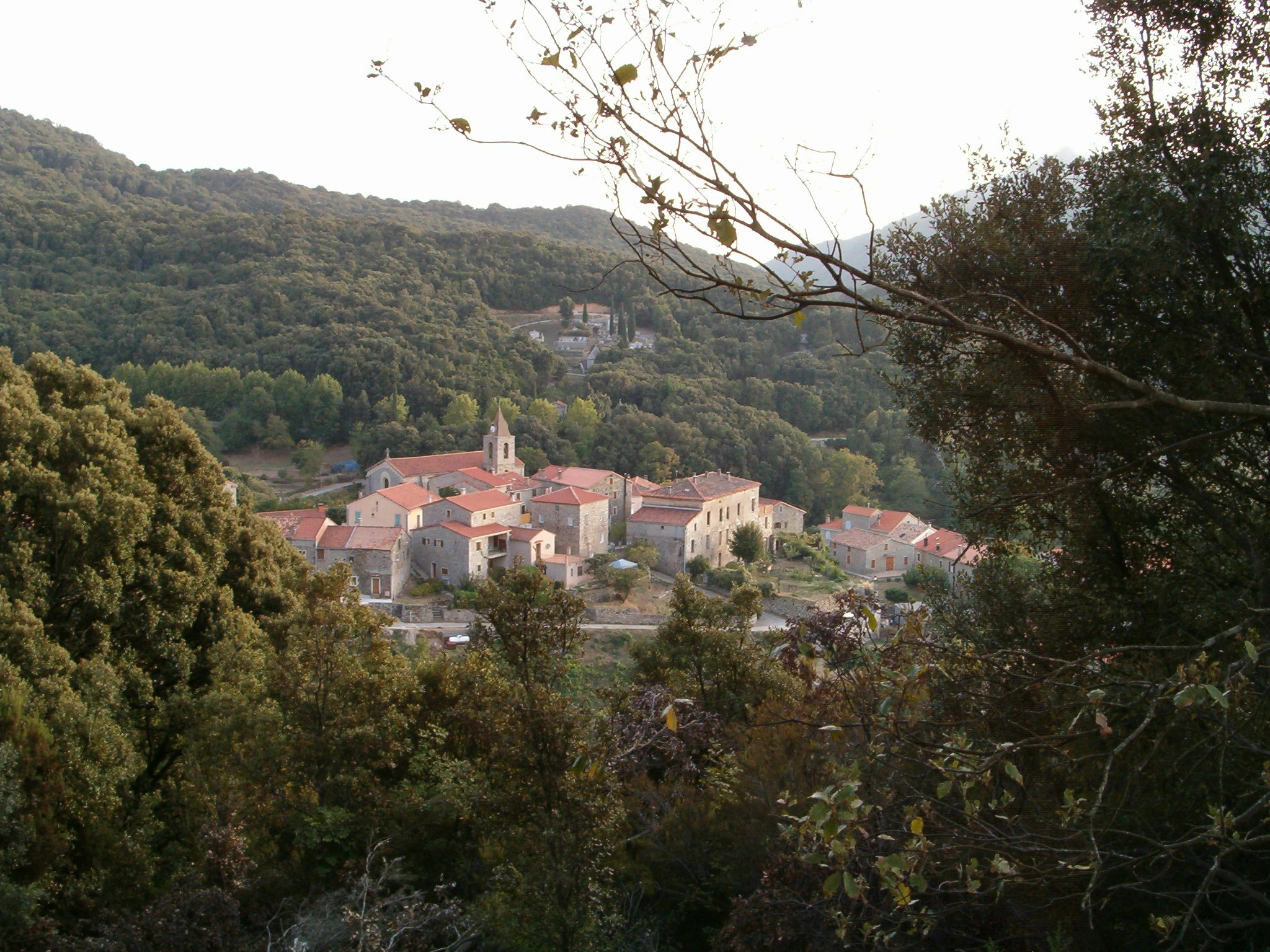
- The village of Casalabriva
- Location of Casalabriva
- Location within France Location within Corsica
- Coordinates: 41°45′14″N 8°56′16″E
- Country: France
- Region: Corsica
- Department: Corse-du-Sud
- Arrondissement: Sartène
- Canton: Taravo-Ornano

Government
  - Mayor (2020–2026): Vincent Micheletti
- Area^{1}: 15.92 km^{2} (6.15 sq mi)
- Elevation: 600 m (2,000 ft)
- Highest elevation: 1,115 m (3,658 ft)
- Lowest elevation: 16 m (52 ft)
- Population (2023): 235
  - Density: 14.8/km^{2} (38.2/sq mi)
- Time zone: UTC+01:00 (CET)
  - Summer (DST): UTC+02:00 (CEST)
- INSEE/Postal code: 2A071 /20140
- ^{1} French Land Register data, which excludes lakes, ponds, glaciers > 1 km^{2} (0.386 sq mi or 247 acres) and river estuaries.

Casalabriva (French pronunciation: [kazalabʁiva]) is a commune in the Corse-du-Sud department of France on the island of Corsica.

== Population ==
Historical population
Year	Pop.	±% p.a.
1968	162	—
1975	139	−2.16%
1982	136	−0.31%
1990	150	+1.23%
1999	181	+2.11%
2007	179	−0.14%
2012	185	+0.66%
2017	213	+2.86%
2023	235	+1.65%
Source: INSEE

== See also ==
- Communes of the Corse-du-Sud department
