= Cognocoli-Monticchi =

Commune in Corsica, France

- Commune
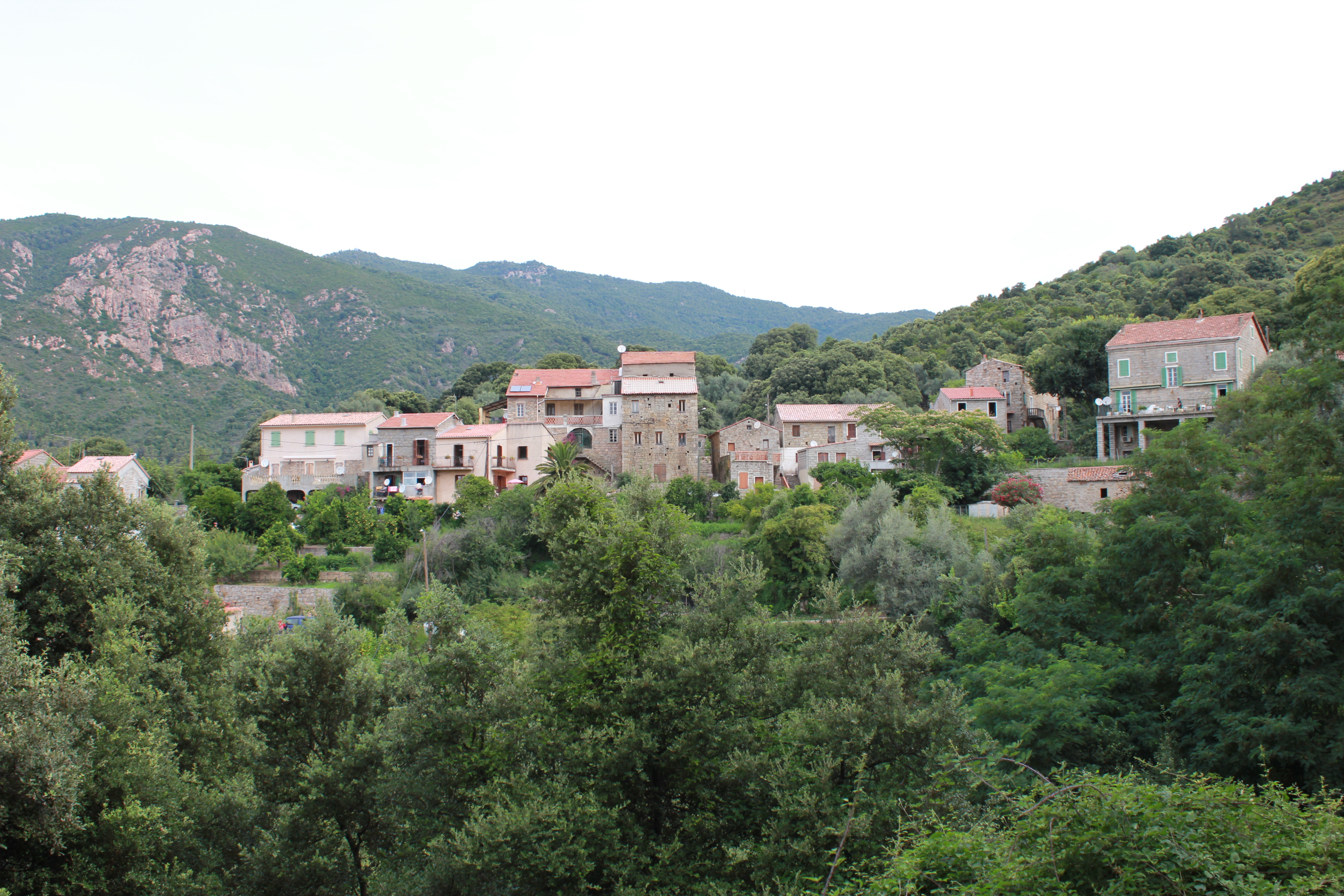
- View of Cognocoli

- Coat of arms
- Location of Cognocoli-Monticchi
- Location within France Location within Corsica
- Coordinates: 41°49′45″N 8°54′22″E
- Country: France
- Region: Corsica
- Department: Corse-du-Sud
- Arrondissement: Ajaccio
- Canton: Taravo-Ornano

Government
  - Mayor (2020–2026): Ange-Marie Aliotti
- Area^{1}: 35.77 km^{2} (13.81 sq mi)
- Elevation: 335 m (1,099 ft)
- Highest elevation: 857 m (2,812 ft)
- Lowest elevation: 9 m (30 ft)
- Population (2023): 172
  - Density: 4.81/km^{2} (12.5/sq mi)
- Time zone: UTC+01:00 (CET)
  - Summer (DST): UTC+02:00 (CEST)
- INSEE/Postal code: 2A091 /20123
- ^{1} French Land Register data, which excludes lakes, ponds, glaciers > 1 km^{2} (0.386 sq mi or 247 acres) and river estuaries.

Cognocoli-Monticchi is a commune in the Corse-du-Sud department of France on the island of Corsica.

== Population ==
Historical population
Year	Pop.	±% p.a.
1968	131	—
1975	143	+1.26%
1982	143	+0.00%
1990	173	+2.41%
1999	164	−0.59%
2007	183	+1.38%
2012	173	−1.12%
2017	169	−0.47%
2023	172	+0.29%
Source: INSEE

== See also ==
- Communes of the Corse-du-Sud department
