= Guitera-les-Bains =

Commune in Corsica, France

- Commune
- Location of Guitera-les-Bains
- Location within France Location within Corsica
- Coordinates: 41°54′53″N 9°05′13″E
- Country: France
- Region: Corsica
- Department: Corse-du-Sud
- Arrondissement: Ajaccio
- Canton: Taravo-Ornano

Government
  - Mayor (2020–2026): Pierre Nonce Lanfranchi
- Area^{1}: 14.75 km^{2} (5.70 sq mi)
- Elevation: 600 m (2,000 ft)
- Highest elevation: 1,567 m (5,141 ft)
- Lowest elevation: 397 m (1,302 ft)
- Population (2023): 154
  - Density: 10.4/km^{2} (27.0/sq mi)
- Time zone: UTC+01:00 (CET)
  - Summer (DST): UTC+02:00 (CEST)
- INSEE/Postal code: 2A133 /20153
- ^{1} French Land Register data, which excludes lakes, ponds, glaciers > 1 km^{2} (0.386 sq mi or 247 acres) and river estuaries.

Guitera-les-Bains (French pronunciation: [ɡɥiteʁa le bɛ̃]), commonly known as Guitera (Corsican: Vuttera), is a commune in the Corse-du-Sud department of France on the island of Corsica.

== Population ==
Historical population
Year	Pop.	±% p.a.
1968	157	—
1975	148	−0.84%
1982	134	−1.41%
1990	81	−6.10%
1999	97	+2.02%
2007	111	+1.70%
2012	129	+3.05%
2017	148	+2.79%
2023	154	+0.66%
Source: INSEE

== See also ==
- Communes of the Corse-du-Sud department
