= List of waterbodies of Corse-du-Sud =

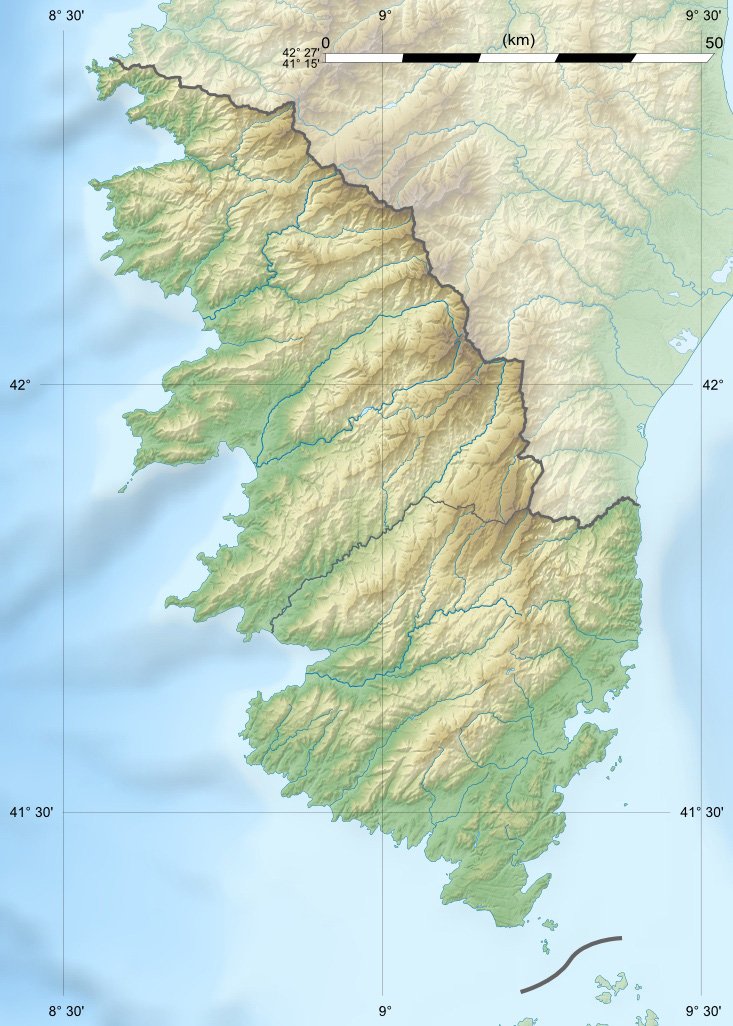
Corse-du-Sud

This list of waterbodies of Corse-du-Sud includes static bodies of water (lakes, reservoirs, coastal lagoons) and flowing bodies of water (rivers and streams) in the department of Corse-du-Sud on the island of Corsica.

== Static waterbodies ==
=== Natural lakes ===
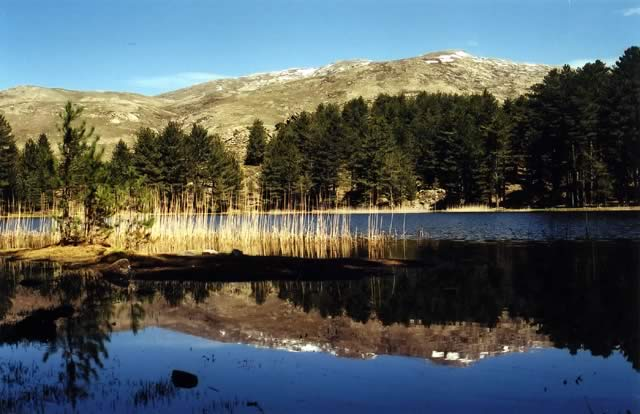
Lac de Creno

Lakes in the Monte Rotondo Massif include:

- Lac de Creno (1,310 metres (4,300 ft))
- Lac de Rinella Soprano (2,135 metres (7,005 ft))
- Lac de Rinella Sottano (1,940 metres (6,360 ft))

Lakes in the Monte Renoso Massif include:

- Lac de Bracca (2,085 metres (6,841 ft))
- Lac de Vitalaca (1,777 metres (5,830 ft))

Lakes in the Monte Incudine Massif include:

- Lac du Monte Tignoso (1,235 metres (4,052 ft))

=== Artificial reservoirs ===
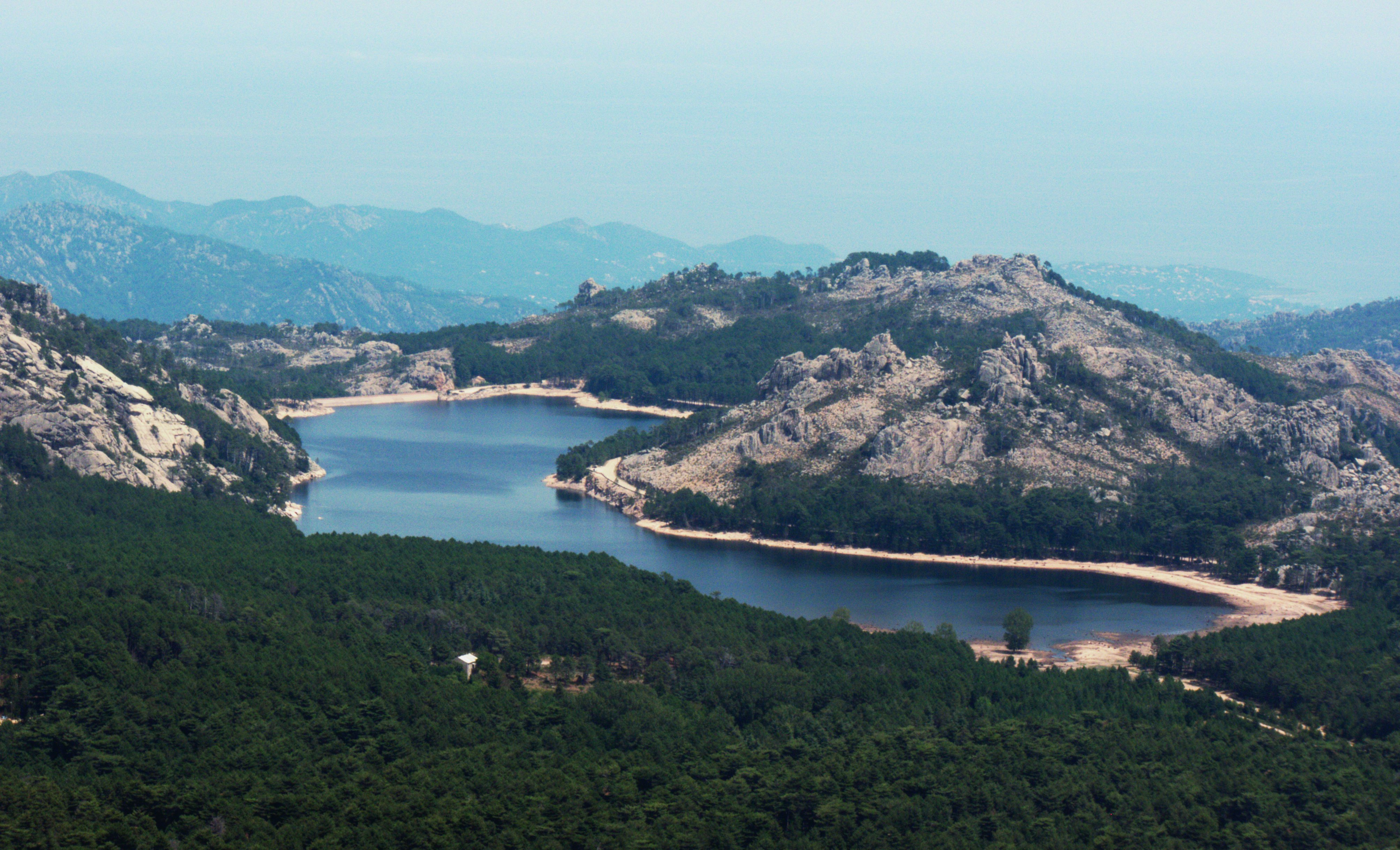
Ospedale Reservoir

Artificial reservoirs built to store water for drinking, irrigation or hydroelectric power generation include:

- Ortolo (180 metres (590 ft))
- Ospedale (945 metres (3,100 ft))
- Talza (42 metres (138 ft))
- Tolla (552 metres (1,811 ft))
- Rizzanese/Zoza (530 metres (1,740 ft))

=== Coastal lagoons ===
- Étang de Balistra
- Étang de Santa Giulia

== Rivers and streams ==
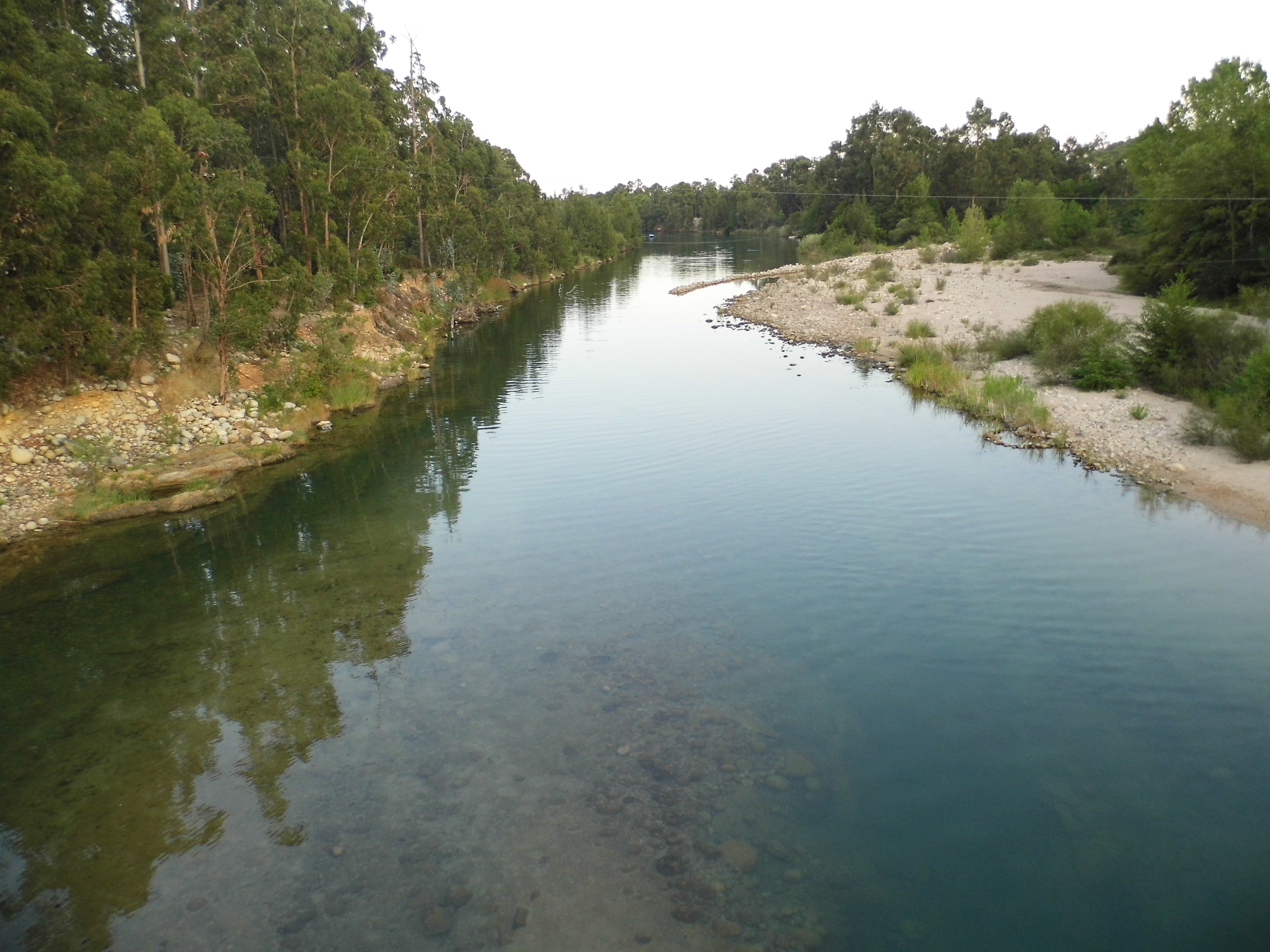
Solenzara

Rivers and streams (French: ruisseaux) in Corse-du-Sud are listed below in clockwise sequence, from east to south to west to north, with their main tributaries.

=== East coast ===
- Solenzara
- Cavu
- Oso
- Lagunienu
- Stabiacciu
- Francolu

=== West coast ===
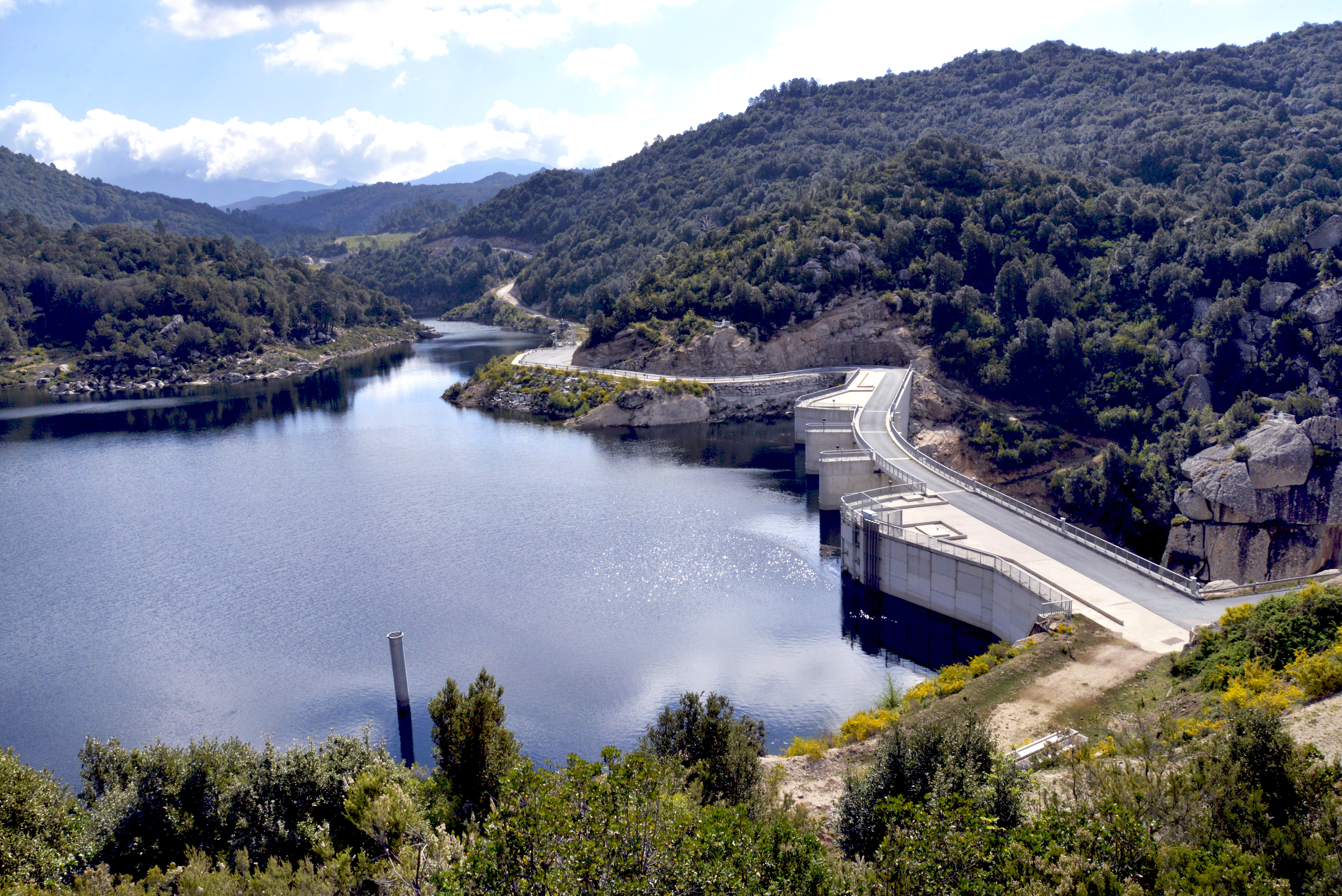
Barrage du Rizzanese

- Canella
- Ortolo
- Rizzanese
  - Fiumicicoli
  - Chiuvone
- Baraci
- Butturacci
- Taravo
- Prunelli
  - Ese
  - Gravona
- Lava
- Liscia
- Sagone
- Liamone
  - Cruzzini
  - Guagno
- Chiuni
- Porto

== See also ==
- List of waterbodies of Haute-Corse
