= Lac de Creno =

- Lavu à Crena (Corsican)
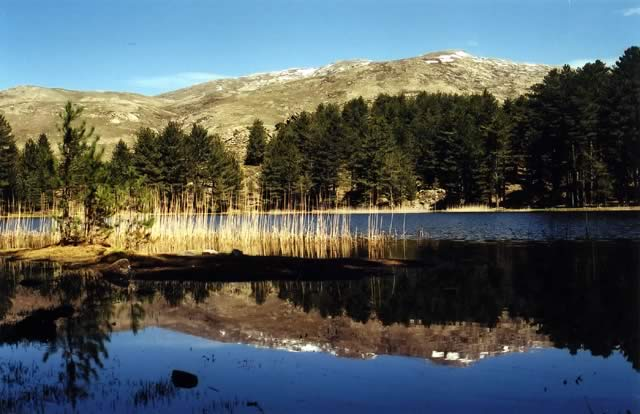
- Lac de Creno

- Location within Corsica Location within France
- Location: Corse-du-Sud, Corsica
- Coordinates: 42.20512°N 8.94635°E
- Type: Lake
- Catchment area: 56 square kilometres (22 sq mi)
- Basin countries: France
- Surface area: 2.3 ha (5.7 acres)
- Max. depth: 6.5 metres (21 ft)
- Surface elevation: 1,310 m (4,300 ft)

The Lac de Creno (Corsican: Lavu à Crena) is a small lake in the Monte Rotondo Massif in the Corse-du-Sud department of France.

== Location ==
The Lac de Creno is in the Monte Rotondo Massif at an altitude of 1,310 metres (4,300 ft). It is in the Orto commune of Corse-du-Sud to the north of the 1,511 metres (4,957 ft) Monte Sant Eliseo. It is drained by the Ruisseau de Creno, which flows south to join the Fiume Grosso, a tributary of the Liamone river. It is a glacial lake, partially covered by water lilies and surrounded by a forest of laricio pines. It is fairly easy to reach by foot from the village of Soccia at an elevation of 1,000 metres (3,300 ft), and is busy in summer.

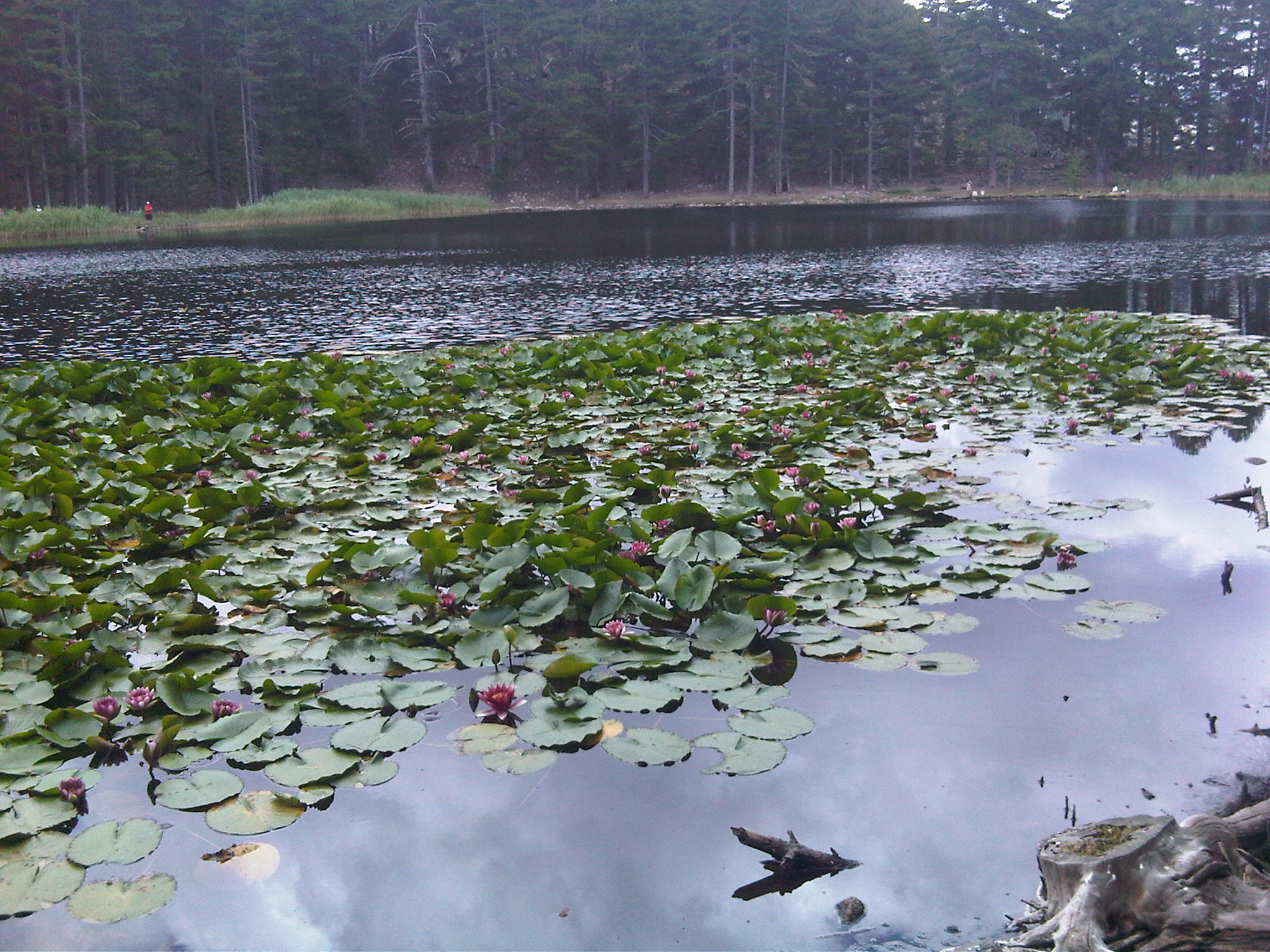

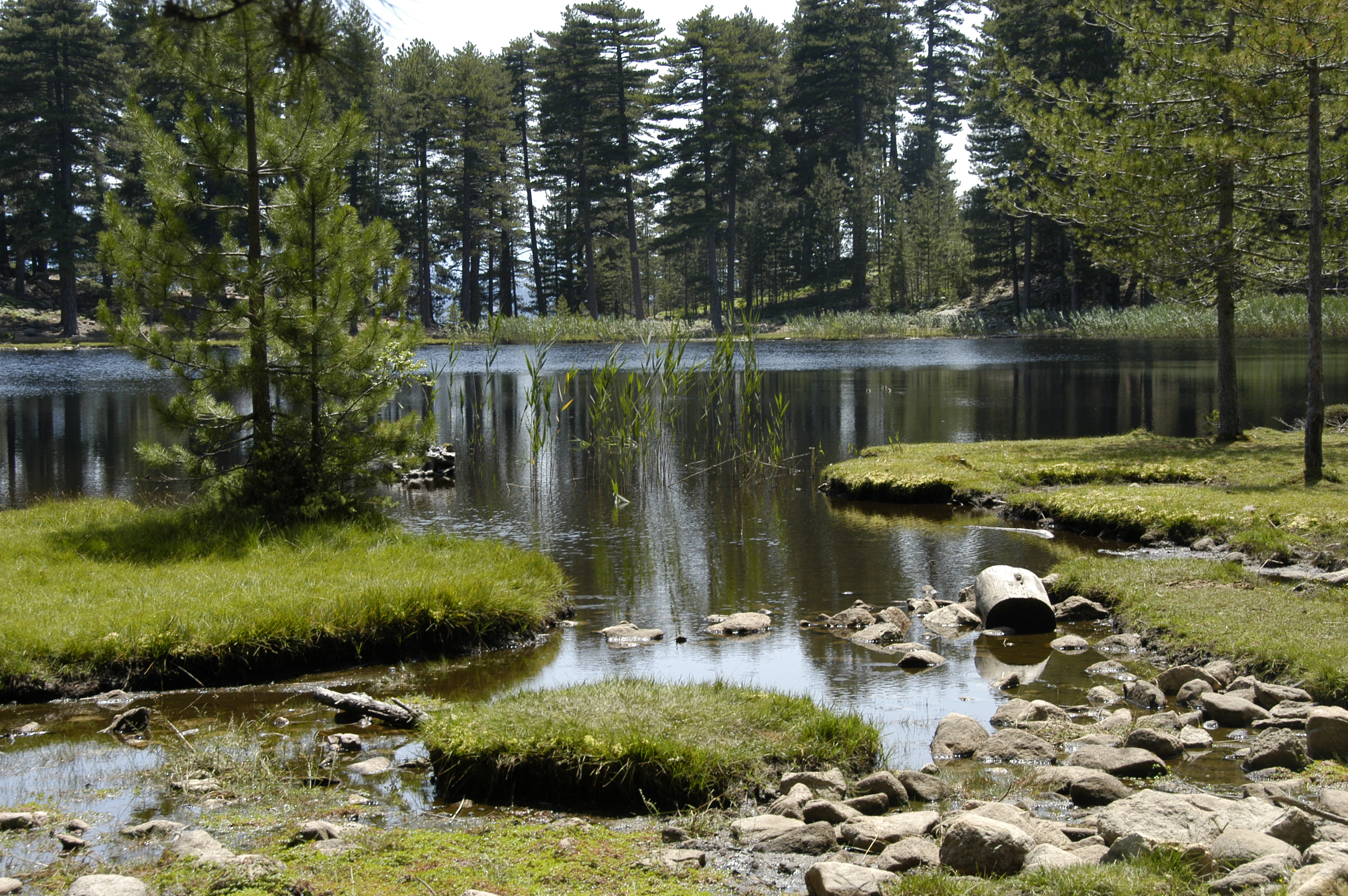

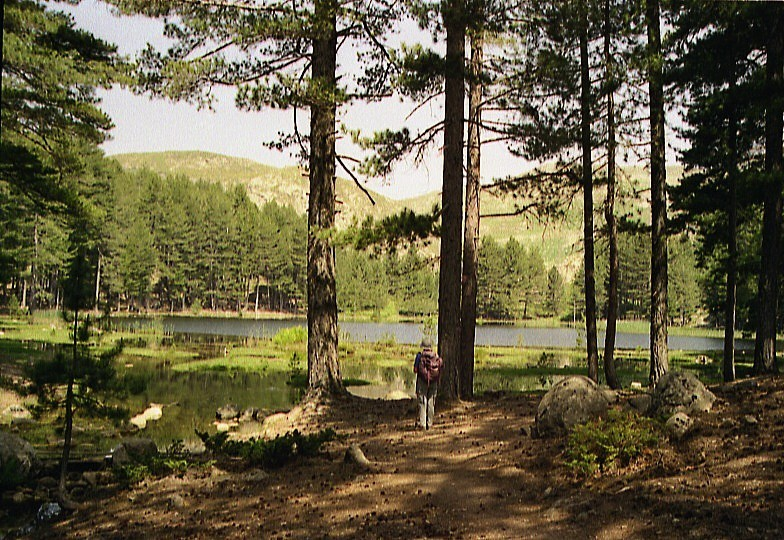

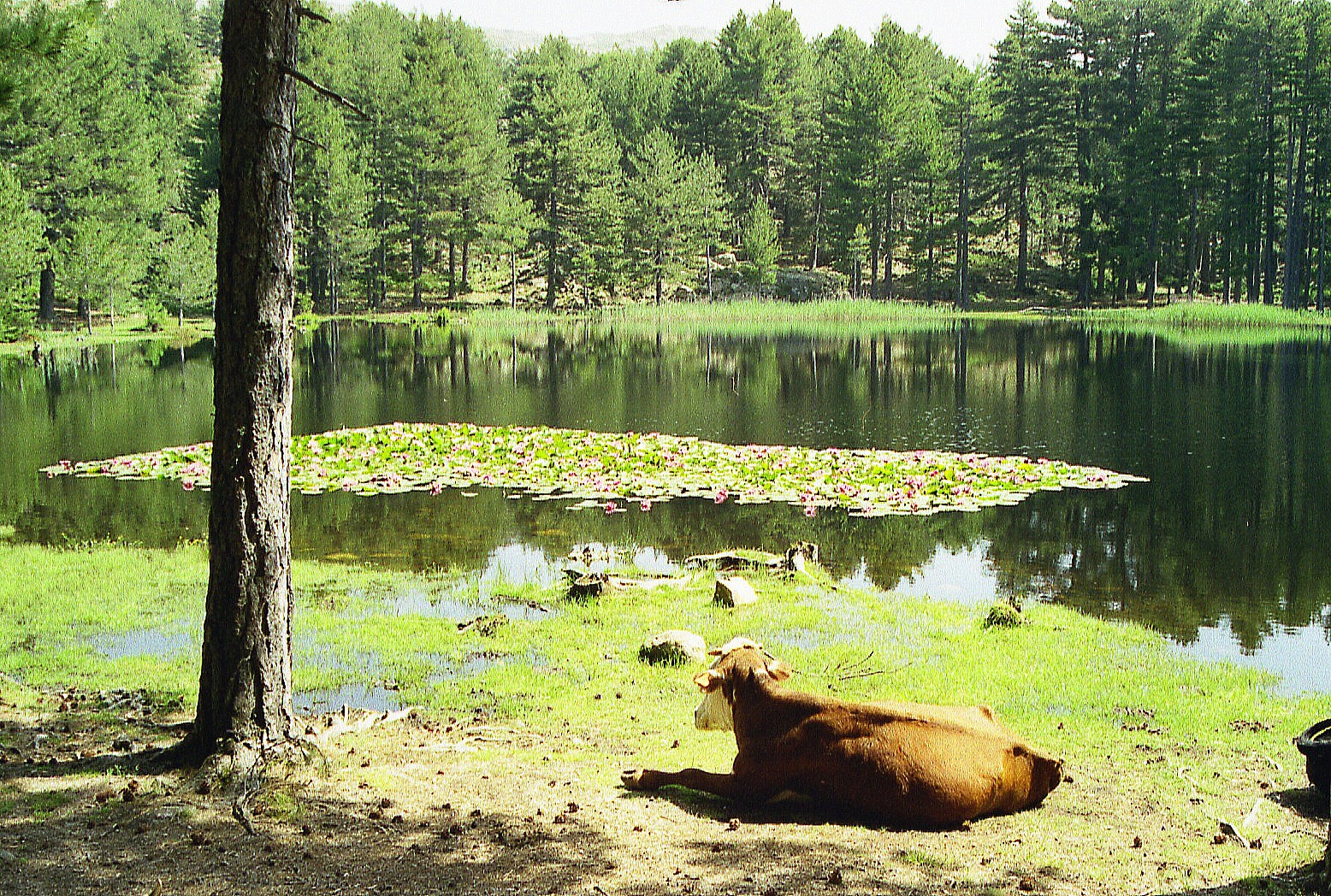

== See also ==
- List of waterbodies of Corse-du-Sud

== Sources ==
- "Le lac de Creno", Randonnées pour petits et grands (in French)
- "Way: Lac de Creno (28890022)", OpenStreetMap
