= Ortolo =

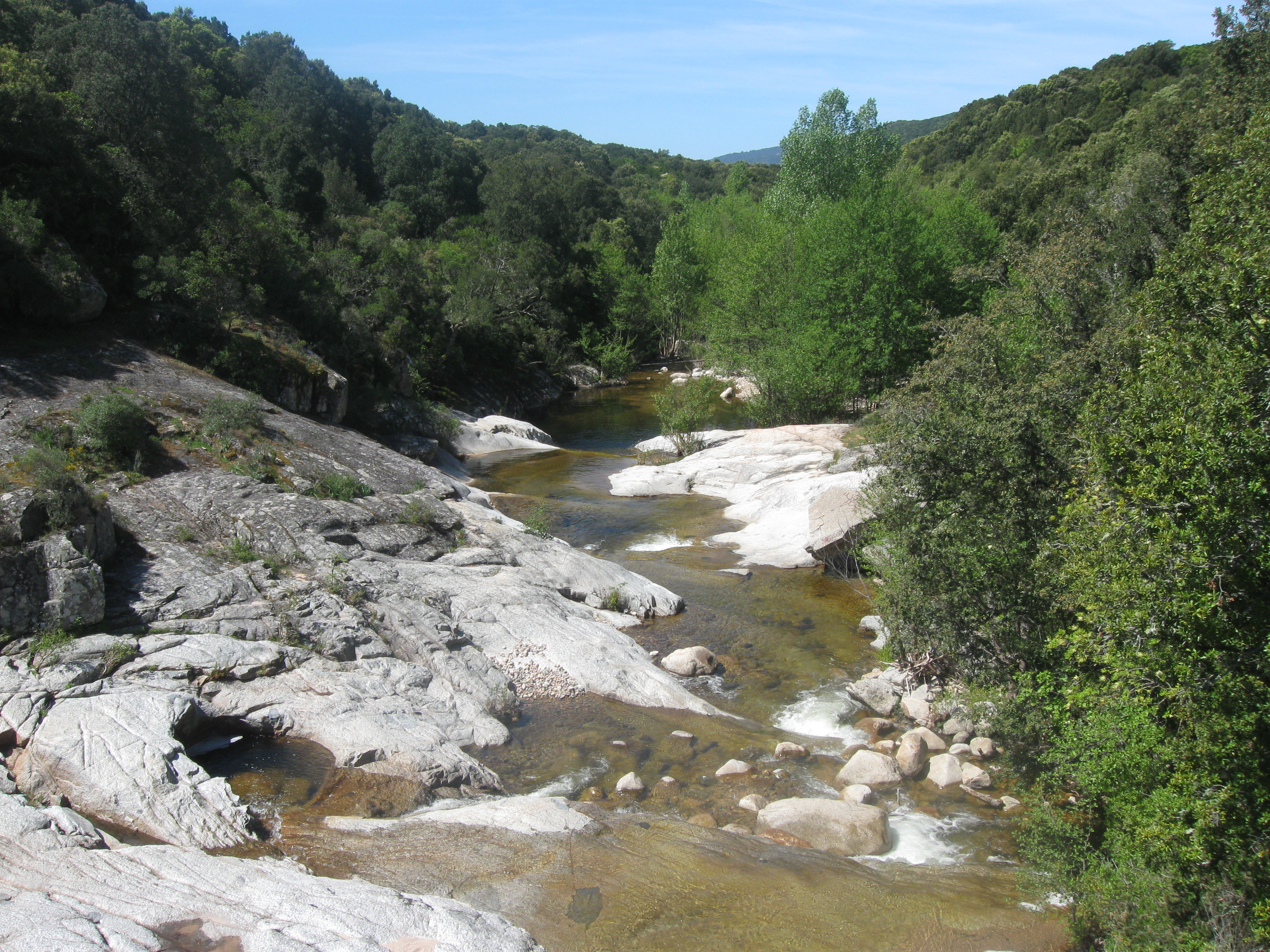
- Ortolo from the metal bridge (upper course)

- Location within Corsica Location within France
- Native name: Urtulu (Corsican)

Location
- Country: France
- Region: Corsica
- Department: Corse-du-Sud

Physical characteristics
- Source
  - coordinates: 41.6542°N 9.1633°E
- Mouth: Mediterranean Sea
  - coordinates: 41.50854°N 8.91319°E
- Length: 31.75 kilometres (19.73 mi)

The Ortolo (Corsican: l'Urtolu) is a coastal river in the southwest of the department of Corse-du-Sud, Corsica, France. It is dammed to store water for irrigation.

== Course ==
The Ortolo is 31.75 kilometres (19.73 mi) long. It crosses the communes of Levie, Foce and Sartène. The river rises at an altitude of 1,225 metres (4,019 ft). Its source is in Levie on the southwest of the 1,314 metres (4,311 ft) Punta di a Vacca Morta. It flows in a generally southwest direction past the hamlet of Bilzese (Foce) to the border of the commune of Sartène where it is dammed to form the Ortolo Reservoir. Below the dam it continues to flow southeast to enter the sea to the southwest of Tizzano.

The D265 road leads east towards the river from the village of Bilzese. The D365 branches off after 2.5 kilometres (1.6 mi) and crosses the river by a metal bridge. From the bridge a footpath leads down to the river, where there are a few small natural swimming pools. There is a larger and deeper pool just below the bridge.

== Dam ==
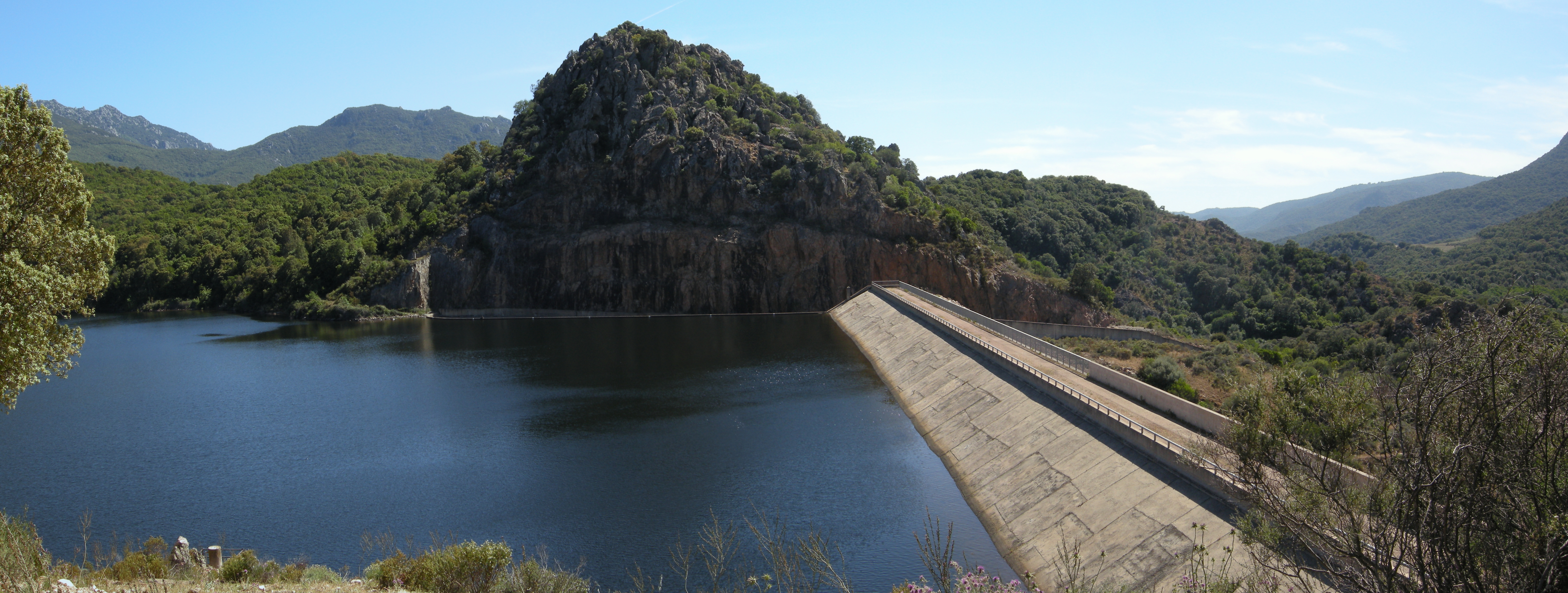
Ortolo Dam (Barrage de l'Ortolo)

The Ortolo reservoir is formed by a dam (Barrage de l'Ortolo) that impounds the Ortolo river. The dam is in the commune of Sartène, while the bulk of the reservoir is in the commune of Levie. The dam is operated by the Office d’Equipement Hydraulique de Corse. It is made of riprap. It contains 2,920,000 cubic metres (103,000,000 cu ft) of water and has a surface area of 26.6 hectares (66 acres). The watershed covers 55 square kilometres (21 sq mi). The dam came into service in 1996 and provides water for irrigation.

== Hydrology ==
Measurements of the river flow were taken at the Moulin de Curgia station in Sartène from 1976 to 1996. The watershed above this station covers 70.3 square kilometres (27.1 sq mi). Average annual precipitation was calculated as 388 millimetres (15.3 in). The average flow of water throughout the year was 0.86 cubic metres per second (30 cu ft/s). The maximum daily flow was 54.6 cubic metres per second (1,930 cu ft/s) recorded on 2 February 1996.

Average flow (cubic meters per second) by month for the period 1976 to 1996
Month	Flow
Jan	1.430
Feb	1.860
Mar	1.540
Apr	1.330
May	0.874
Jun	0.281
Jul	0.088
Aug	0.083
Sep	0.087
Oct	0.412
Nov	1.000
Dec	1.410

The river was measured higher up at the Vignalella station in Levie from 1996 to 2021. At this point the watershed is 26.2 square kilometres (10.1 sq mi). Average annual precipitation was calculated as 460 millimetres (18 in). The average flow of water throughout the year was 0.381 cubic metres per second (13.5 cu ft/s). The maximum daily flow was 22.2 cubic metres per second (780 cu ft/s) recorded on 23 December 2007.

== Tributaries ==
The following streams (ruisseaux) are tributaries of the Ortolo (ordered by length) and sub-tributaries:

- Balatèse: 7 km (4.3 mi)
- Capitellu: 6 km (3.7 mi)
  - Zeruleca: 3 km (1.9 mi)
    - Pendone: 1 km (0.62 mi)
  - Alia: 2 km (1.2 mi)
  - Bartuleone: 1 km (0.62 mi)
  - Vulpicini: 1 km (0.62 mi)
  - Acqua Torta: 1 km (0.62 mi)
- Funtanella: 5 km (3.1 mi)
  - Mezzati: 2 km (1.2 mi)
    - Tempesta: 1 km (0.62 mi)
- Lataga: 4 km (2.5 mi)
- Petra Ponta: 4 km (2.5 mi)
  - Filumozzu: 2 km (1.2 mi)
  - Urtale: 2 km (1.2 mi)
- Cauria: 4 km (2.5 mi)
- Chiuva: 4 km (2.5 mi)
- Saparella: 4 km (2.5 mi)
- Mola: 4 km (2.5 mi)
  - Giuncheto: 3 km (1.9 mi)
- Castellu: 4 km (2.5 mi)
- Cuticciu: 4 km (2.5 mi)
- Casacce: 4 km (2.5 mi)
- Caraglia: 4 km (2.5 mi)
- Canalsecco: 3 km (1.9 mi)
- Mela: 3 km (1.9 mi)
- Salcinaja: 3 km (1.9 mi)
- Caldaja: 3 km (1.9 mi)
- Lampinu: 2 km (1.2 mi)
- Petra Mattaja: 2 km (1.2 mi)
- Capu d'Omo: 2 km (1.2 mi)
- Vangone Niellu: 2 km (1.2 mi)
- Alzeta: 2 km (1.2 mi)
- Curbaju: 2 km (1.2 mi)
- Ribaldino: 1 km (0.62 mi)

== Sources ==
- Corse : Barrage d'Ortolo (in French), Comité Français des Barrages et Réservoirs (CFBR)
- Istria, Ange-François (10 November 2017), "Corse-du-Sud. Importants travaux au barrage de l'Ortolo", Corse Matin (in French)
- L'Ortolo à Levie [Vignalella] (in French), Ministère de l'Ecologie, du Développement Durable et de l'Energie
- L'Ortolo à Sartène [Moulin de Curgia] (in French), © Ministère de l'Ecologie, du Développement Durable et de l'Energie
- "L'Ortolo", Sandre (in French)
- "Ortolo", Paradisu (in French)
- "Relation: L'Ortolo (7390992)", OpenStreetMap (in French)
- "Way: Réservoir de l'Ortolo (80500026)", OpenStreetMap
