= Lac du Monte Tignoso =

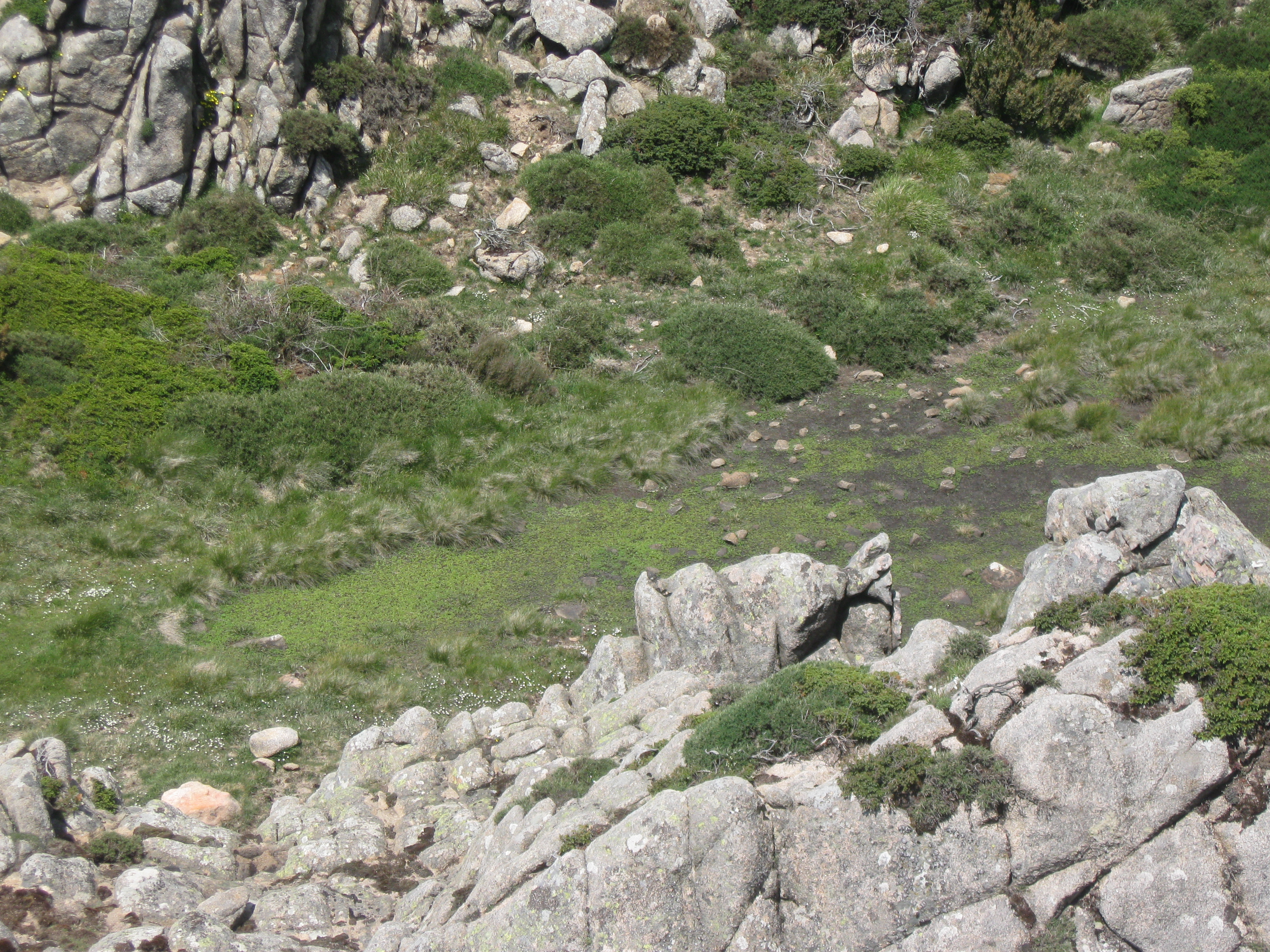

- Location within Corsica Location within France
- Location: Corse-du-Sud, Corsica
- Coordinates: 41.58306°N 9.09278°E
- Type: Lake
- Basin countries: France

Lac du Monte Tignoso (Corsican: Lavu di u Monti Tignosu) is a small lake in the Monte Renoso Massif in the Corse-du-Sud department of France.

== Location ==
The lake is in the Monte Incudine Massif at an elevation of 1,235 metres (4,052 ft). It is in the commune of Figari, on the southeast flank of the Montagne de Cagna above the source of the Ruisseau de Vivaggio. It is a seasonal lake that is dry for much of the year.

== See also ==
- List of waterbodies of Corse-du-Sud

== Sources ==
- "Les plus beaux lacs de Corse", CorsicaTours (in French)
- "Recherche: Monte Tignoso 20114 Figari", geoportail (in French)
