= Étang de Santa Giulia =

- Stagnu di Santa Ghjulia (Corsican)
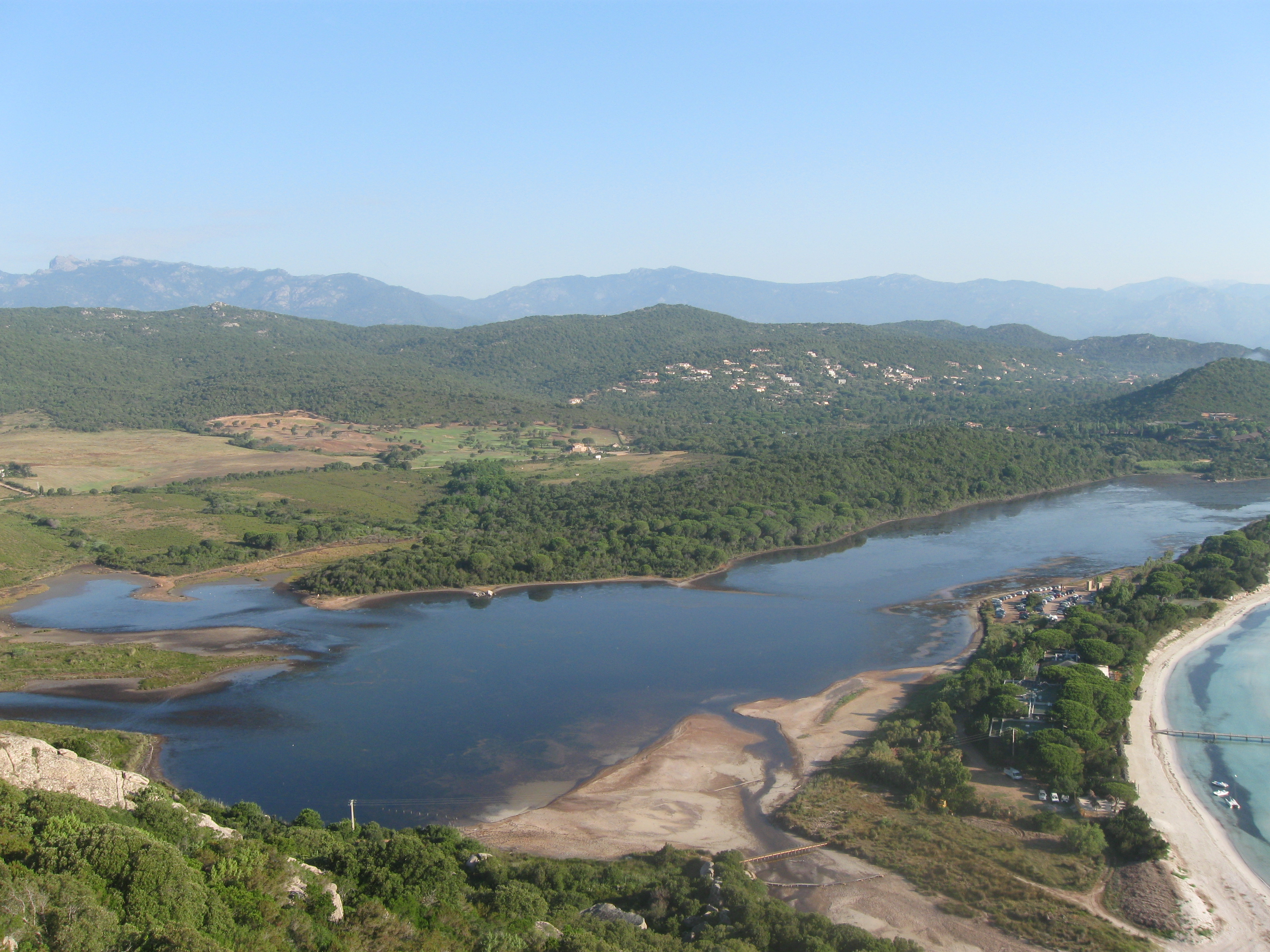
- The lagoon from the south

- Location within Corsica Location within France
- Location: Corse-du-Sud, Corsica
- Coordinates: 41.5275°N 9.2697°E
- Type: Lake
- Catchment area: 56 square kilometres (22 sq mi)
- Basin countries: France
- Surface area: 2.3 ha (5.7 acres)
- Max. depth: 6.5 metres (21 ft)
- Surface elevation: 1,310 m (4,300 ft)

The Étang de Santa Giulia (Corsican: Stagnu di Santa Ghjulia) is a coastal lagoon in the Corse-du-Sud department of France.

== Location ==
The Étang de Santa Giulia extends along the west shore of the Golfe de Santa Giulia to the south of the village of Santa Giulia. It lies between the T10 highway and the sea, and is south of Porto-Vecchio. It is fed at the south end by the Ruisseau de Punta Rossa Vignarellu and the smaller seasonal Ruisseau d'Alzellu.

== Conservation status ==
The Étang de Santa Giulia and land that surrounds it has been designated as a Zone naturelle d'intérêt écologique, faunistique et floristique (ZNIEFF), covering 61 hectares (150 acres). This is past of a larger 3.99 square kilometres (1.54 sq mi) Terrestrial Protected Area of land acquired by Conservatoire du Littoral (national seaside and lakeside conservancy).

== See also ==
- List of waterbodies of Corse-du-Sud

== Sources ==
- Santa Giulia 147367, Protected Planet
- "Way: Étang de Santa Giulia (28890175)", OpenStreetMap
- "ZNIEFF 940004106 Étang de Santa Giulia", INPN Inventaire national du patrimoine naturel (in French)
