= Canella (river) =

- Location within Corsica Location within France
- Native name: Ruisseau de Canella (French)

Location
- Country: France
- Region: Corsica
- Department: Corse-du-Sud

Physical characteristics
- Mouth: Mediterranean Sea
  - coordinates: 41.4775°N 9.0798°E
- Length: 16.43 kilometres (10.21 mi)

The Canella (French: Ruisseau de Canella) is a coastal stream in the south of the department of Corse-du-Sud, Corsica, France. It has ecologically interesting wetlands at its mouth.

== Course ==
The Canella is 16.43 kilometres (10.21 mi) long. It crosses the communes of Figari and Pianottoli-Caldarello. The Canella rises between the 1,340 metres (4,400 ft) Punta d'Ovace to the west and the 1,371 metres (4,498 ft) Malpassu to the east. It forms the boundary between the communes of Pianottoli-Caldarello and Figari. It flows south past Figari–Sud Corse Airport to enter the Mediterranean Sea near the southern tip of Corsica.

The mouth of the river where it enters the end of the Bay of Figari is in an area of marshes, meadows and wetlands that is classified as a Zone naturelle d'intérêt écologique, faunistique et floristique (ZNIEFF). This is a rich natural space with a very diverse set of environments and habitats characteristic of Mediterranean wetlands and the west coast of Corsica. Flora includes Salicornia emerici and Ranunculus macrophyllus. Fauna includes European pond turtle (Emys orbicularis) and European bee-eater (Merops apiaster).

== Tributaries ==
The following streams (ruisseaux) are tributaries of the Canella (ordered by length) and sub-tributaries:

- Carcerone: 12 km (7.5 mi)
  - Suale Vecchio: 9 km (5.6 mi)
- Vitelille: 4 km (2.5 mi)
- Barba Porca: 2 km (1.2 mi)

== Sources ==
- "Relation: Ruisseau de Canella (8762795)", OpenStreetMap
- "Ruisseau de Canella", Sandre (in French)
- "ZNIEFF 940030942 embouchure et zone humide de la Baie de Figari", Inventaire national du patrimoine naturel (INPN) (in French)
