= Étang de Balistra =

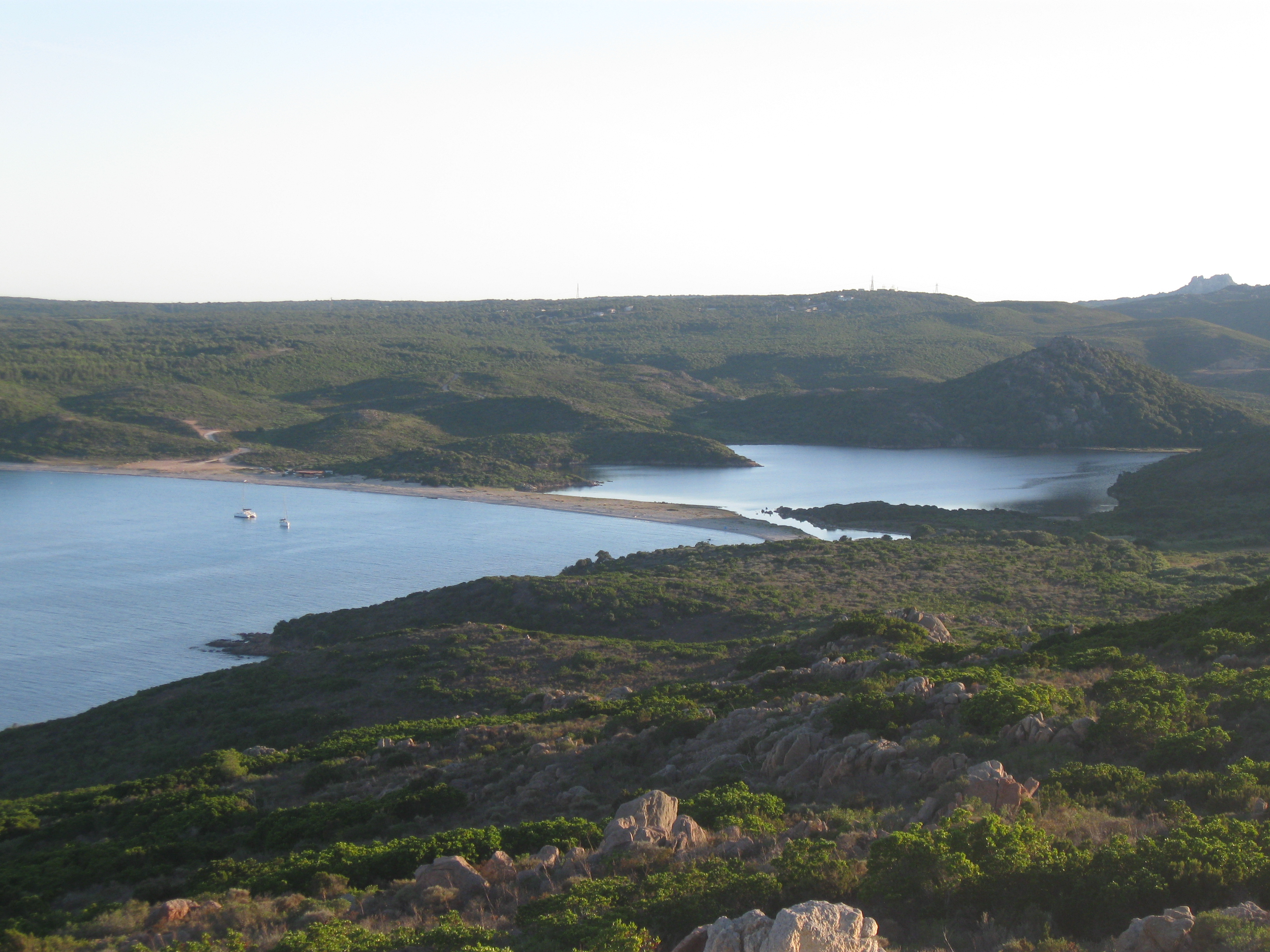
- Golfe de Sant Amanza, Plage de Balistra, Étang de Balistra

- Location within Corsica Location within France
- Location: Corse-du-Sud, Corsica
- Coordinates: 41.4403°N 9.2163°E
- Type: Lagoon
- Basin countries: France

The Étang de Balistra is a coastal lagoon in the Corse-du-Sud department of France.

== Location ==
The Étang de Balistra is in the commune of Bonifacio. It is separated from the northwest angle of the Golfe de Sant Amanza by the Plage de Balistra, a beach. It is fed by the Ruisseau de Francolu. It lies between the T10 highway and the sea. The lagoon has an area of 24.25 hectares (59.9 acres). It has an average depth of 1.7 metres (5 ft 7 in) and a greatest depth of 4 metres (13 ft). There are some meadows with a few cows to the northwest of the lagoon, and a firing range belonging to the Bonifacio military legion to the south. The lido (sand bar) is used by campers who access it from a track to the south of the lagoon. The lagoon is privately owned, and the owners do not appear to manage it.

== Environment ==
The pool is surrounded by maquis shrubland that descends to the edge of the water. In some places there is a narrow belt of spiny rush (Juncus acutus), sea rush (Juncus maritimus) and wheatgrass (Agropyron) between the shrubs and the water, and in the small coves. The open water is used by great cormorants and great crested grebes, and sometimes by diving ducks. At the foot of the lagoon, where the Ruisseau de Francolo enters through a swamp, there is an extensive sansouire (salt-tolerant grasses) mixed with spiny rush and sea rush. Shorebirds frequent this area. The dune has tufts of quackgrass (Elymus repens) and rushes. There is a reed bed north of the grau where the lagoon drains into the sea.

== See also ==
- List of waterbodies of Corse-du-Sud

== Sources ==
- "Étang de Balistra", Pôle lagunes (in French)
- "Way: Étang de Balistra (28890171)", OpenStreetMap
