= Oso (river) =

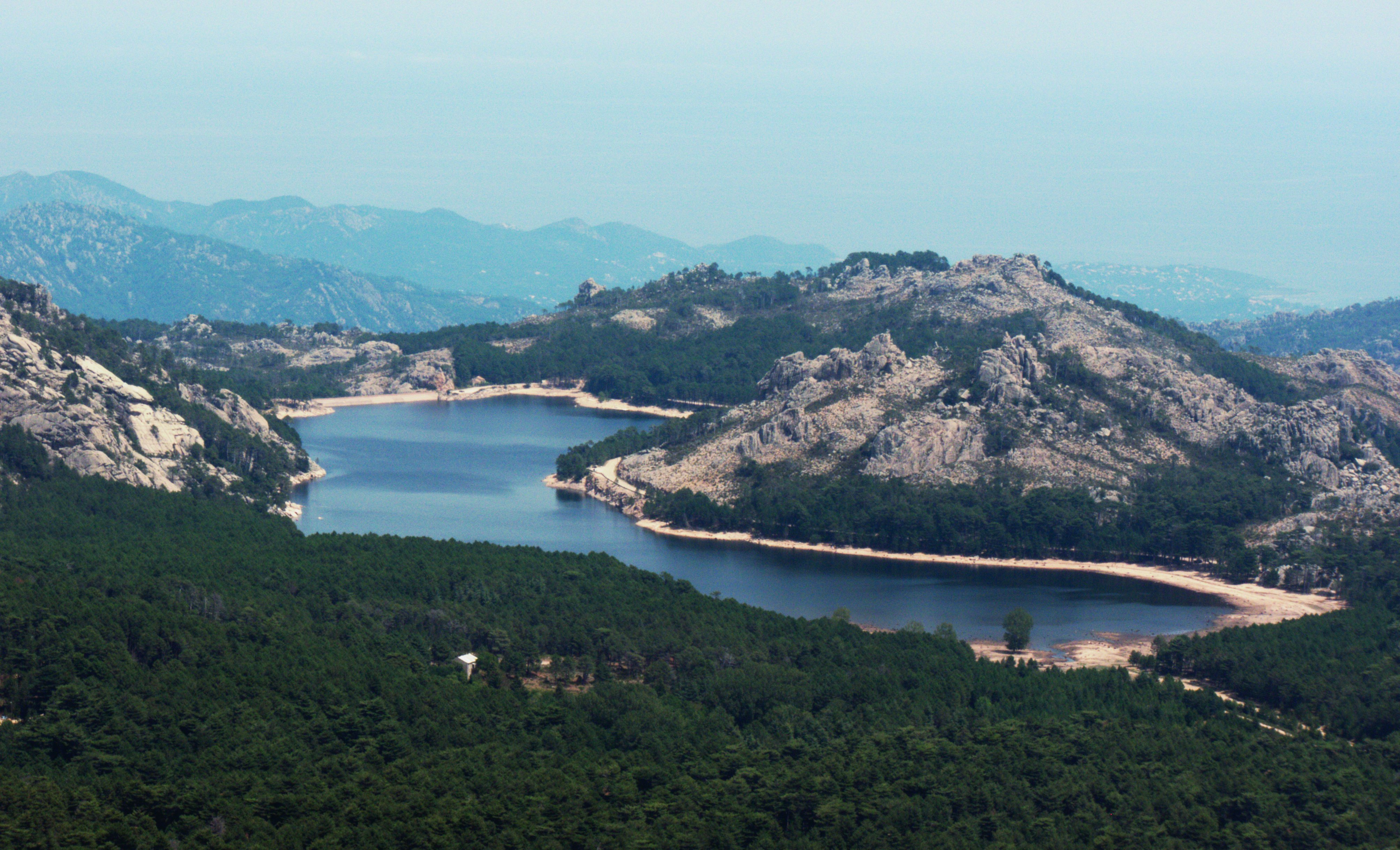
- Ospedale Reservoir

- Location within Corsica Location within France
- Native name: Osu (Corsican)

Location
- Country: France
- Region: Corsica
- Department: Corse-du-Sud

Physical characteristics
- Mouth: Tyrrhenian Sea
  - coordinates: 41.6286°N 9.3137°E
- Length: 23.27 kilometres (14.46 mi)

The Oso (or Osu) is a small coastal river in the southeast of the department of Corse-du-Sud, Corsica, France.

== Course ==
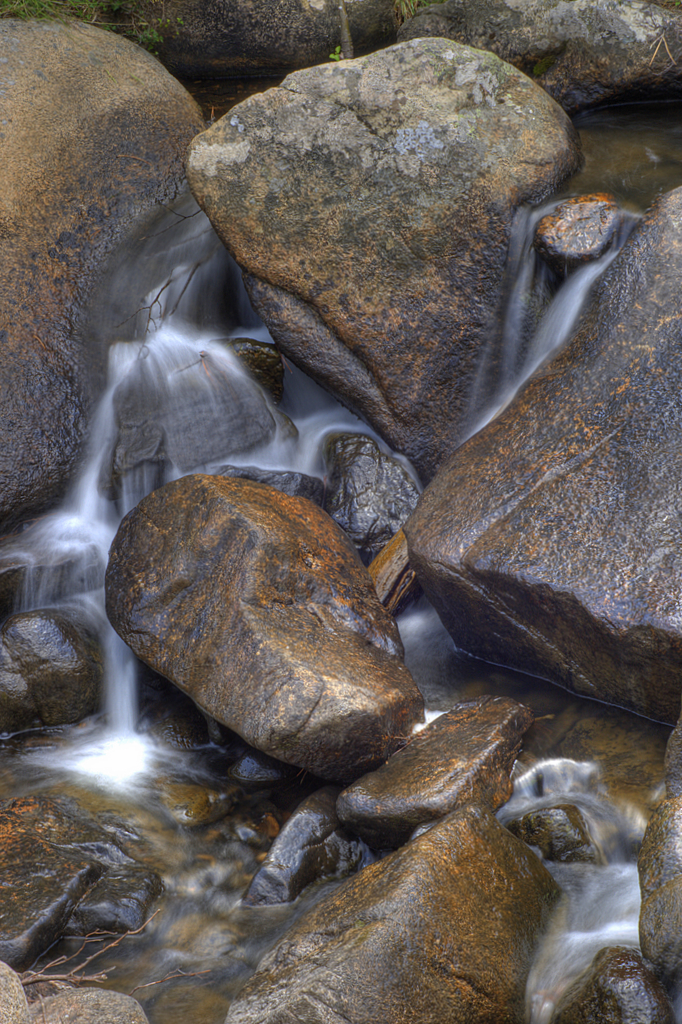
Ruisseau de Piscia di Ghjaddu

The Oso is 23.27 kilometres (14.46 mi) long. It crosses the communes of Lecci, Porto-Vecchio, San-Gavino-di-Carbini and Zonza. The Oso rises to the southwest of the 1,381 metres (4,531 ft) Monte Calva. The source is in the territorial forest of L'Ospedale at an altitude of 980 metres (3,220 ft) about 1 kilometre (0.62 mi) northeast of the 1,227 metres (4,026 ft) Punta di u Diamante.

In its upper section the stream is called the Ruisseau de Piscia di Ghjaddu. A waterfall on this section is one of the regional tourist attractions. It flows southwest, then southeast, and receives the Ruisseau de Palavesani from the right, which drains the Ospedale Reservoir. It then flows east and then south, then turns west to enter Stagnolu Bay to the west of Saint-Cyprien. There are beautiful natural pools for swimming in the mountainous section and in the plains.

== Hydrology ==
Measurements of the river flow were taken at the Lecci station from 1968 to 1980. The watershed above this station covers 46.2 square kilometres (17.8 sq mi). Annual precipitation was calculated as 660 millimetres (26 in). The average flow of water throughout the year was 0.962 cubic metres per second (34.0 cu ft/s).

Average flow (cubic meters per second) by month for the period 1968 to 1980
Month	Flow
Jan	1.950
Feb	2.110
Mar	1.690
Apr	1.390
May	0.845
Jun	0.361
Jul	0.126
Aug	0.246
Sep	0.274
Oct	0.483
Nov	0.841
Dec	1.310

== Tributaries ==
The following streams (ruisseaux) are tributaries of the Oso (ordered by length) and sub-tributaries:

- Sant'Antonaccio 10 km (6.2 mi)
  - Filasca 4 km (2.5 mi)
- Poggi Alti 6 km (3.7 mi)
- Conca 6 km (3.7 mi)
- Marginicciu 4 km (2.5 mi)
  - Chiustracciu 3 km (1.9 mi)
- Palavesani 4 km (2.5 mi)
- Tresigna 2 km (1.2 mi)
- Fenaja 2 km (1.2 mi)
- Orditoju 2 km (1.2 mi)

== Sources ==
- "Au cours de l'Oso à Lecci", Corse Matin (in French), 6 July 2012
- "L'Oso à Lecci", eaufrance, Ministère de l'Ecologie, du Développement Durable et de l'Energie
- "L'Osu", Sandre (in French)
- "Relation: L'Oso (8481154)", OpenStreetMap
