= Stabiacciu =

Francolu Rau
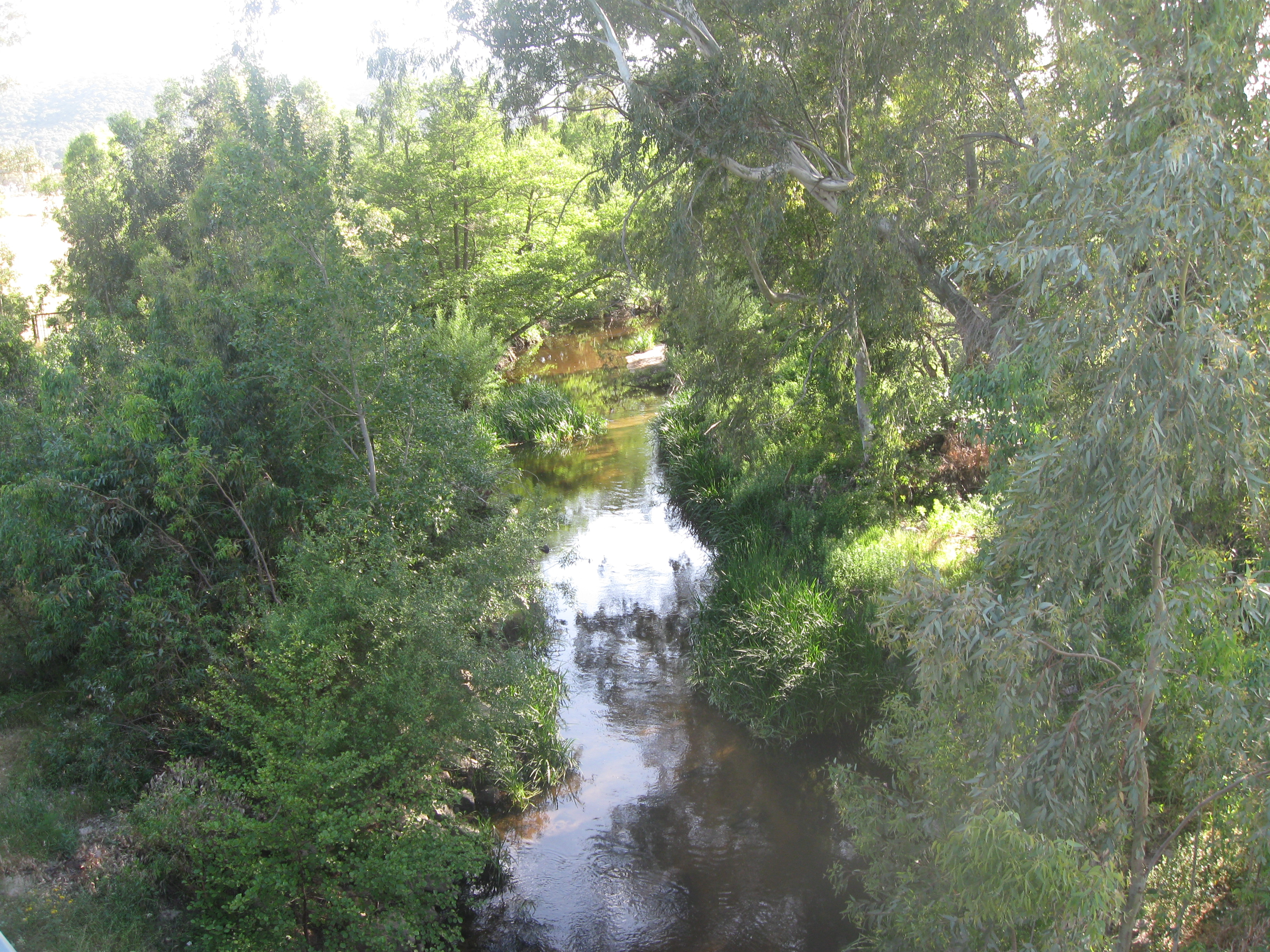
- Stabiacciu at the double-lane bridge south of Porto-Vecchio

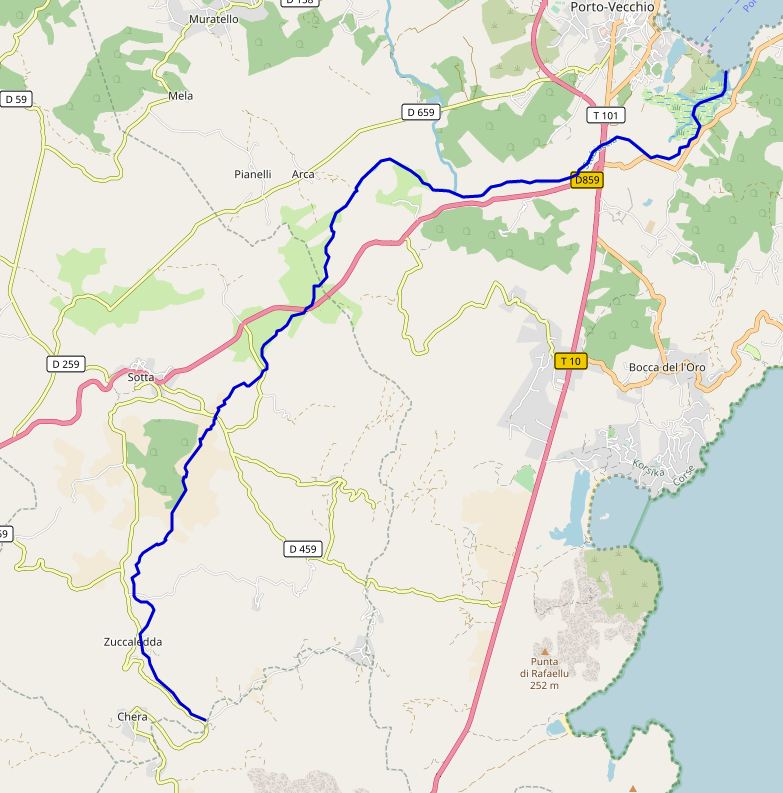
- Course of the Stabiacciu

- Location within Corsica Location within France
- Native name: Ruisseau de Francolu (French)

Location
- Country: France
- Region: Corsica
- Department: Corse-du-Sud

Physical characteristics
- Mouth: Tyrrhenian Sea
  - coordinates: 41.5838°N 9.2954°E
- Length: 17.26 kilometres (10.72 mi)

The Stabiacciu (French: Rivière u Stabiacciu) is a coastal river in the southeast of the department of Corse-du-Sud, Corsica, France. The estuary, which contains an abandoned salt works, is rich in fauna and flora.

== Course ==
The Stabiacciu is 17.26 kilometres (10.72 mi) long. It crosses the communes of Porto-Vecchio and Sotta. The river rises in the commune of Sotta to the east of the village of Chera. It flows in a generally northeast direction past the villages of Sotta and Ceccia, then enters the Golfe de Porto Veccio to the southeast of the city of Porto Vecchio. It spreads out into marshy land near its mouth, bordering the Salines de Porto Vecchio.

== Estuary ==
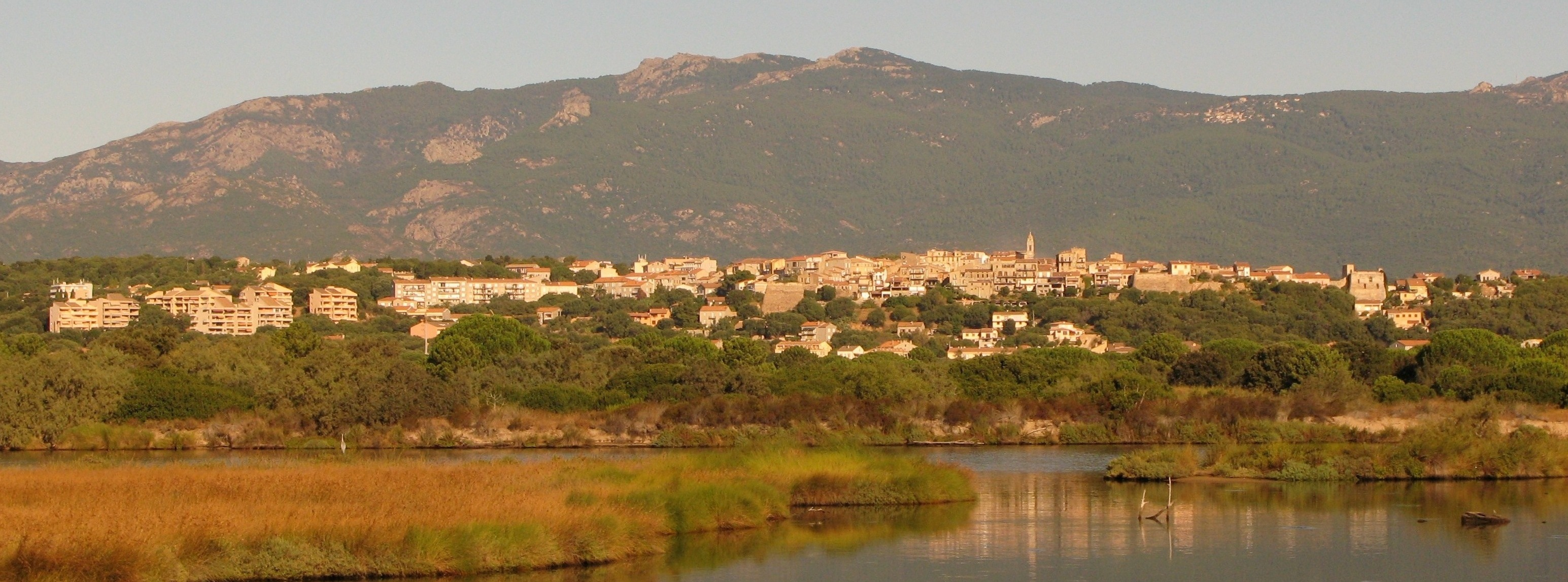
Poerto Vecchio from the estuary

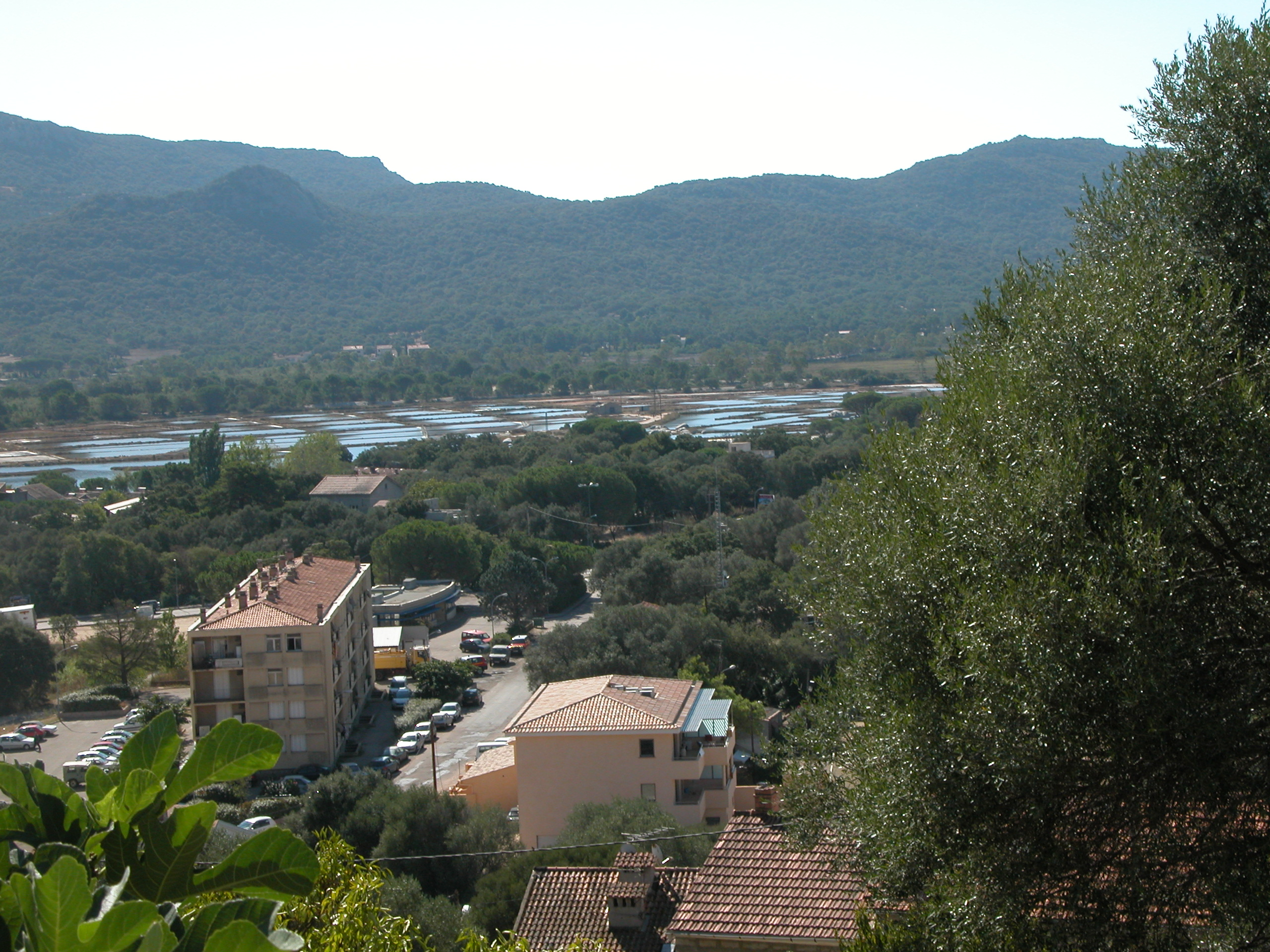
Salt marshes from Porto Vecchio

The mouth of the Stabiacciu, with areas that are regularly flooded, marshes, old salt pans and open water is rich in plant and animal species. The Conservatoire du littoral now manages the estuary to prevent degradation of the natural space, which is used by joggers, ornithologists, amateur fishermen and photographers. There are extensive salt meadows and marshes.

The Salines de Porto Vecchio in the northwest are salt marshes that were used to harvest sea salt from 1795 until the 2000s. More than 900 kilograms (2,000 lb) of white salt was harvested each year, an important product of the city of Porto Vecchio. The salt works have now been abandoned, the wooden walkways are rotting and huts have collapsed. Salt-tolerant plants are growing on the side of the canals and herons and seagulls frequent the waters.

The marshes are bordered by Phragmites and along the river the riparian forest contains black alder (Alnus glutinosa) and black poplar (Populus nigra). Two endangered plants thrive: Silene velutina and Daucus rouyi. The estuary is a nursery for many marine species, notably the small Mediterranean killifish (Aphanius fasciatus). bottlenose dolphins (Tursiops truncatus) may be seen on the side side, and Hermann's tortoise (Testudo hermanni) has a preserved habitat on the land side.

The estuary itself is frequented by flamingos, small shorebirds, herons, egrets and stilts which feed on amphibians such as Italian pool frog (Pelophylax bergeri), Tyrrhenian painted frog (Discoglossus sardus) and Balearic green toad (Bufotes balearicus). Birds that reproduce in the estuary include tawny pipit (Anthus campestris), common nighthawk (Chordeiles minor), common linnet (Linaria cannabina) and zitting cisticola (Cisticola juncidis).

== Hydrology ==
Measurements of the river flow were taken at the Moulin de Lastreto station in Sotta from 1971 to 1997. The watershed above this station covers 22.6 square kilometres (8.7 sq mi). The average flow of water throughout the year was 0.382 cubic metres per second (13.5 cu ft/s).

Average flow (cubic meters per second) by month for the period 1971 to 1997
Month	Flow
Jan	0.644
Feb	0.890
Mar	0.655
Apr	0.527
May	0.316
Jun	0.069
Jul	0.019
Aug	0.017
Sep	0.020
Oct	0.140
Nov	0.512
Dec	0.818

== Tributaries ==
The following streams (ruisseaux) are tributaries of the Stabiacciu (ordered by length) and sub-tributaries:

- Orgone: 15 km (9.3 mi)
  - Caccia: 7 km (4.3 mi)
  - Vica: 4 km (2.5 mi)
  - Vangoncella: 3 km (1.9 mi)
    - Risoli: 2 km (1.2 mi)
  - Vasculacciu: 2 km (1.2 mi)
  - Becchi: 2 km (1.2 mi)
  - Cirviolu: 1 km (0.62 mi)
- Bala (river): 13 km (8.1 mi)
  - Petrosu: 11 km (6.8 mi)
    - Fraura: 4 km (2.5 mi)
  - Scopa Piana: 10 km (6.2 mi)
    - Gavinu: 2 km (1.2 mi)
    - Licetu: 1 km (0.62 mi)
    - Fiuritu: 1 km (0.62 mi)
  - Scaparone: 1 km (0.62 mi)
- Piscia: 6 km (3.7 mi)
  - Butacina: 5 km (3.1 mi)
    - Corbagja: 7 km (4.3 mi)
- Rocheta: 4 km (2.5 mi)
- Sarconcella: 3 km (1.9 mi)
- Vergaggiola: 3 km (1.9 mi)
- Cuparchiata: 2 km (1.2 mi)
- Mezzanellu: 2 km (1.2 mi)
- Anton Guglielmu: 2 km (1.2 mi)
- Litaretu: 1 km (0.62 mi)

== Sources ==
- Arry, Matthéo (11 October 2019), "Les salines de Porto-Vecchio : Une richesse économique à l'abandon", Corse Net Infos (in French)
- Embouchure du Stabiacciu (in French), Conservatoire du littoral
- "Le Stabiaccio à Sotta [Moulin de Lastreto]", eaufrance (in French), Ministère de l'Ecologie, du Développement Durable et de l'Energie
- "Relation: Rivière u Stabiacciu (8537212)", OpenStreetMap
- "Rivière u Stabiacciu", Sandre (in French)
