= Butturacci =

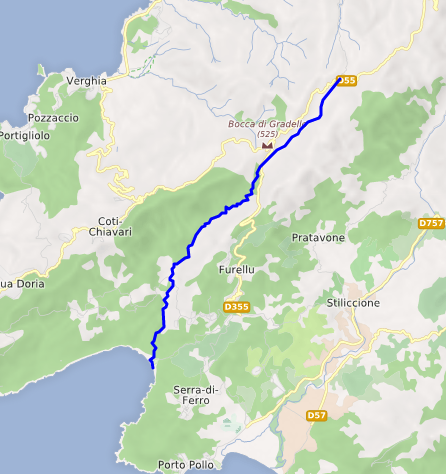
- Course of the Butturacci

- Location within Corsica Location within France

Location
- Country: France
- Region: Corsica
- Department: Corse-du-Sud

Physical characteristics
- Mouth: Mediterranean Sea
  - coordinates: 41.73511°N 8.78425°E
- Length: 24.29 kilometres (15.09 mi)

The Butturacci (French: Ruisseau Butturacci or Ruisseau Botoracci) is a coastal stream in the department of Corse-du-Sud, Corsica, France.

== Course ==
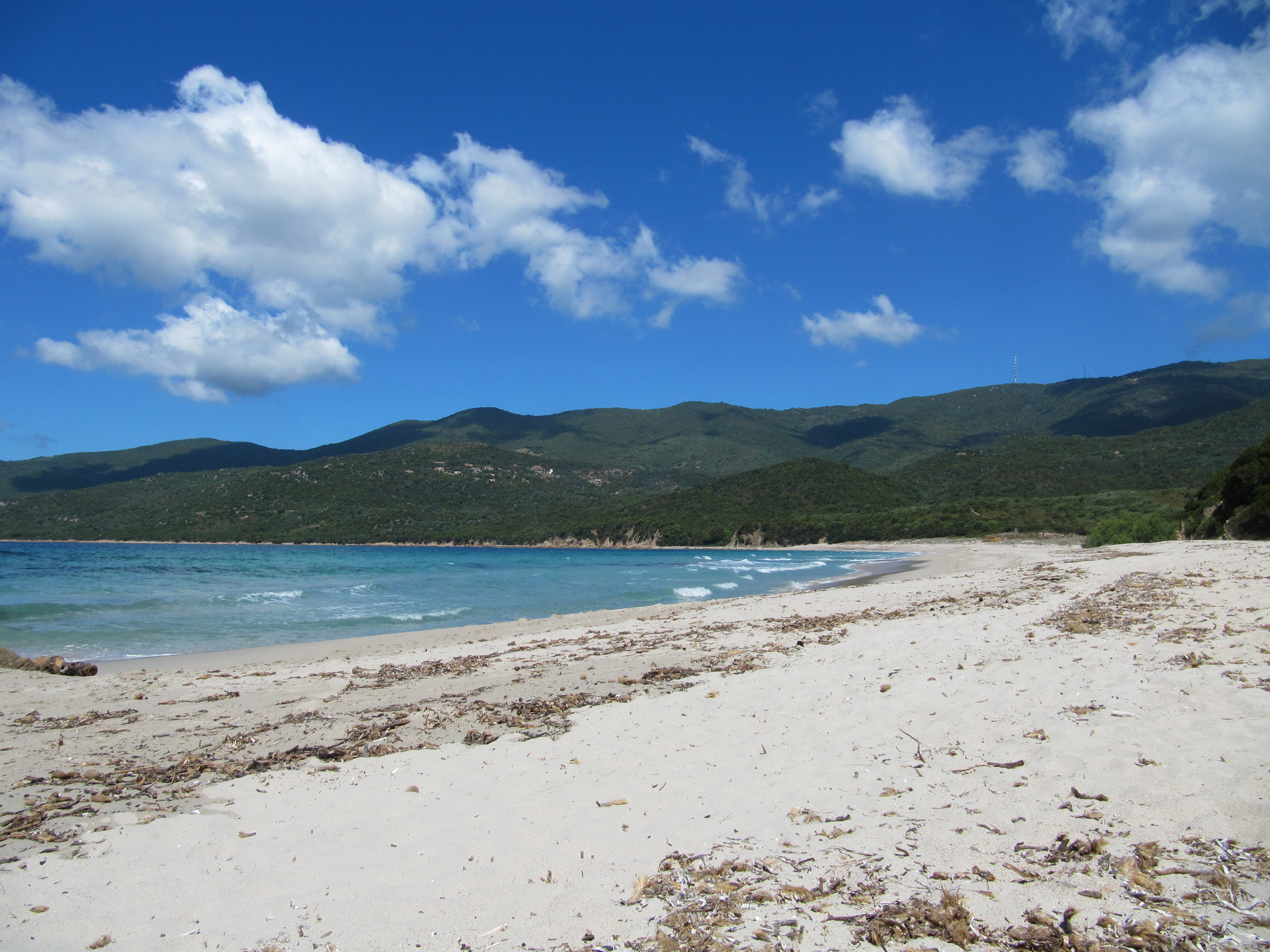
Cupabia beach

The Butturacci is 11.89 kilometres (7.39 mi) long.} It drains the valley between the hills to the east and southeast of Coti Chiavari and the hills west of Tassinca.Paradis It rises in the commune of Cognocoli-Monticchi. It flows southeast, forming the boundary between the communes of Serra-di-Ferro and Coti-Chiavari. It enters the Baie de Cupabia at Cupabia beach.

At the beach it receives the 3 kilometres (1.9 mi) Vesco Vecchio stream, which is dry much of the year. In wet winters the Butturacci cuts across the sandy cordon and beach. When the flow decreases, usually starting in March, the end of its course becomes more or less parallel to the sandy strip, flowing to the southeast before entering the sea.

The Köppen climate classification is Csb : Warm-summer Mediterranean climate.

== Hydrology ==
The flow of the stream was measured from 1979 to 1994 at the Pont de Gradello station in Coti-Chiavari. At this point the drainage basin covers 3.75 square kilometres (1.45 sq mi). The greatest daily flow was 0.512 cubic metres per second (18.1 cu ft/s) on 6 November 1980. A ruined mill on the Butturacci 500 metres (1,600 ft) north of the beach, the Moulin de Copabio, is noted on the 1846 land register, which reflects agricultural activity in the nineteenth century greater than today.

== Tributaries ==
The following streams (ruisseaux) are tributaries of the Ruisseau Butturacci:

- Ruisseau Vesco Vecchio
- Ruisseau Tenera

== Sources ==
- "Butturacci, Corse, France", mindat
- "Le Botoracci à Coti-Chiavari [Pont de Gradello]", eaufrance (in French), Ministère de l'Ecologie, du Développement Durable et de l'Energie
- Paradis, G.; Piazza, C. (2018), "Végétation en 2017 du site dunaire du Cupabia (Corse)" (PDF), Evaxiana (in French), 4, Société botanique du Centre-Ouest: 172–216
- "Relation: Ruisseau Butturacci (8726858)", OpenStreetMap
- "ruisseau butturacci", Sandre (in French)
