= Lagunienu =

- Location within Corsica Location within France

Location
- Country: France
- Region: Corsica
- Department: Corse-du-Sud

Physical characteristics
- Mouth: Tyrrhenian Sea
  - coordinates: 41.6043°N 9.2857°E
- Length: 7.27 kilometres (4.52 mi)

The Lagunienu is a small coastal stream in the southeast of the department of Corse-du-Sud, Corsica, France.

== Course ==
The Lagunienu is 7.27 kilometres (4.52 mi) long. It flows through the commune of Porto-Vecchio. There are no named tributaries. The stream rises to the northwest of the hamlet of Renajolo and flows in a generally southeast direction past the village of Palavesa to enter the Golfe de Porto-Vecchio between Poretta and Marina di Fiori. There are east-facing beaches on either side of the mouth of the Lagunienu.

== Sources ==
- "Plage Porto Vecchio", Vacances en Corse (in French)
- "Relation: Ruisseau de Lagunienu (9719852)", OpenStreetMap
- "Ruisseau de Lagunienu", Sandre (in French)
