= Ortolo Reservoir =

- Réservoir de l'Ortolo (French)
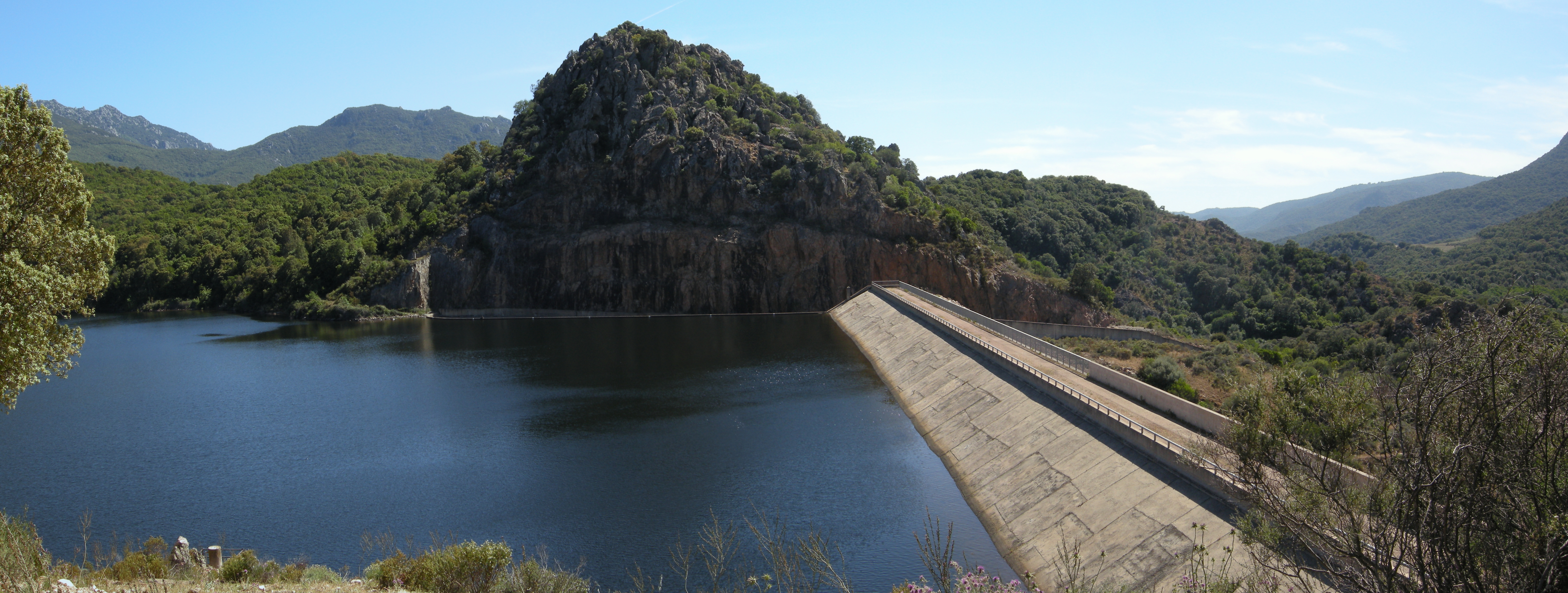
- Ortolo Dam (Barrage de l'Ortolo)

- Location within Corsica Location within France
- Location: Corse-du-Sud, Corsica
- Coordinates: 42.20512°N 8.94635°E
- Type: Lake
- Basin countries: France

The Ortolo Reservoir (French: Réservoir de l'Ortolo) is a reservoir in the Corse-du-Sud department of France on the island of Corsica.

== Location ==
The Ortolo reservoir is formed by a dam (Barrage de l'Ortolo) that impounds the Ortolo river. Other affluents are the Ruisseau de Latagu and the Ruisseau de Caraglia. The southwest end and the dam are in the commune of Sartène, while the bulk of the reservoir is in the commune of Levie. The reservoir is to the north of the 1,340 metres (4,400 ft) Punta d'Ovace.

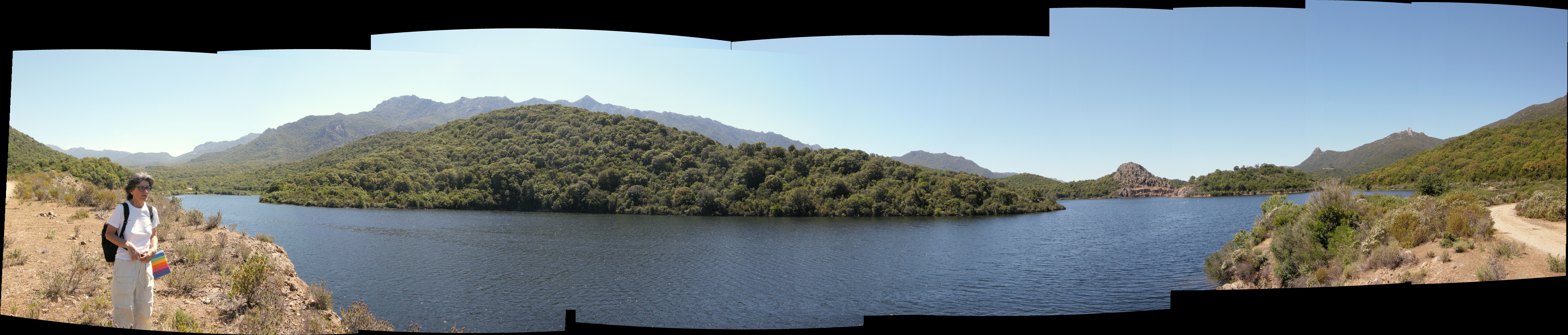
The reservoir from the north shore. Cagna mountain in the background

== Dam ==
The dam is owned by the Collectivité Territoriale de Corse and operated by the Office d’Equipement Hydraulique de Corse. It is made of riprap. The dam is sealed by a 5 millimetres (0.20 in) thick asphalt-impregnated geomembrane, known as a bituminous geomembrane. It is faced with concrete slabs 0.14 metres (5.5 in) thick, reinforced with polypropylene fibers. There is a needled nonwoven polypropylene geotextile between the geomembrane and the slabs. The concrete slabs were cast in place.

The dam is 36 metres (118 ft) high and 143 metres (469 ft) long with a crest elevation of 175.7 metres (576 ft). It contains 2,920,000 cubic metres (103,000,000 cu ft) of water and has a surface area of 26.6 hectares (66 acres). The watershed covers 55 square kilometres (21 sq mi). The dam provides water for irrigation.

Fishing is allowed, including angling or casting from the shore, fishing from a flat-bottomed boat without a motor, or from a float tube.

== History ==
The dam was filled in 1995. It came into service in 1996. Average volume actually contained fluctuated in the period from 2003 to 2019 between about 1,600,000 cubic metres (57,000,000 cu ft) to 2,800,000 cubic metres (99,000,000 cu ft).

Over the first twenty years the structure suffered severe degradation. In July 2013 an expert reported that the 1 metre (3 ft 3 in) diameter intake pipe, which had been 10 millimetres (0.39 in) thick was in some places reduced to 3 millimetres (0.12 in). In March 2014 farmers in Cauria-Tizzano-Conca in Sartène staged a protest because they were not receiving water from the dam. Repair work started in 2016 but was interrupted by floods in November and December that year. Work resumed in November 2017.

== See also ==
- List of waterbodies of Corse-du-Sud

== Sources ==
- Cazzuffi, Daniele; Giroud, Jean-Pierre; Scuero, Alberto; Vaschetti, Gabriella (2011), "Emploi des géomembranes dans les barrages : 50 ans de différentes applications dans le monde" (PDF), Rencontres Géosynthétiques (in French)
- Cazzuffi, Daniele; Giroud, Jean-Pierre; Scuero, Alberto; Vaschetti, Gabriella (2012), "Cinquante ans de différentes applications des géomembranes dans les barrages", Sciences Eaux & Territoires (in French), 8 (3): 2–13, doi:10.3917/set.008.002
- Corse : Barrage d'Ortolo (in French), Comité Français des Barrages et Réservoirs (CFBR)
- Istria, Ange-François (10 November 2017), "Corse-du-Sud. Importants travaux au barrage de l'Ortolo", Corse Matin (in French)
- "La colère des agriculteurs de Cauria-Tizzano-Conca", Corse Matin (in French), 21 March 2014
- Liste des sites : Ci-dessous les ouvrages accessibles à la pêche (in French), OEHC Office d’Equipement Hydraulique de Corse
- Situation hydrométéorologique BASSIN DE CORSE Mois de AOUT 2020 (PDF) (in French), DREAL Corse, Service Biodiversité, Eau et Paysage
- "Way: Réservoir de l'Ortolo (80500026)", OpenStreetMap, September 2020
