= Ospedale Reservoir =

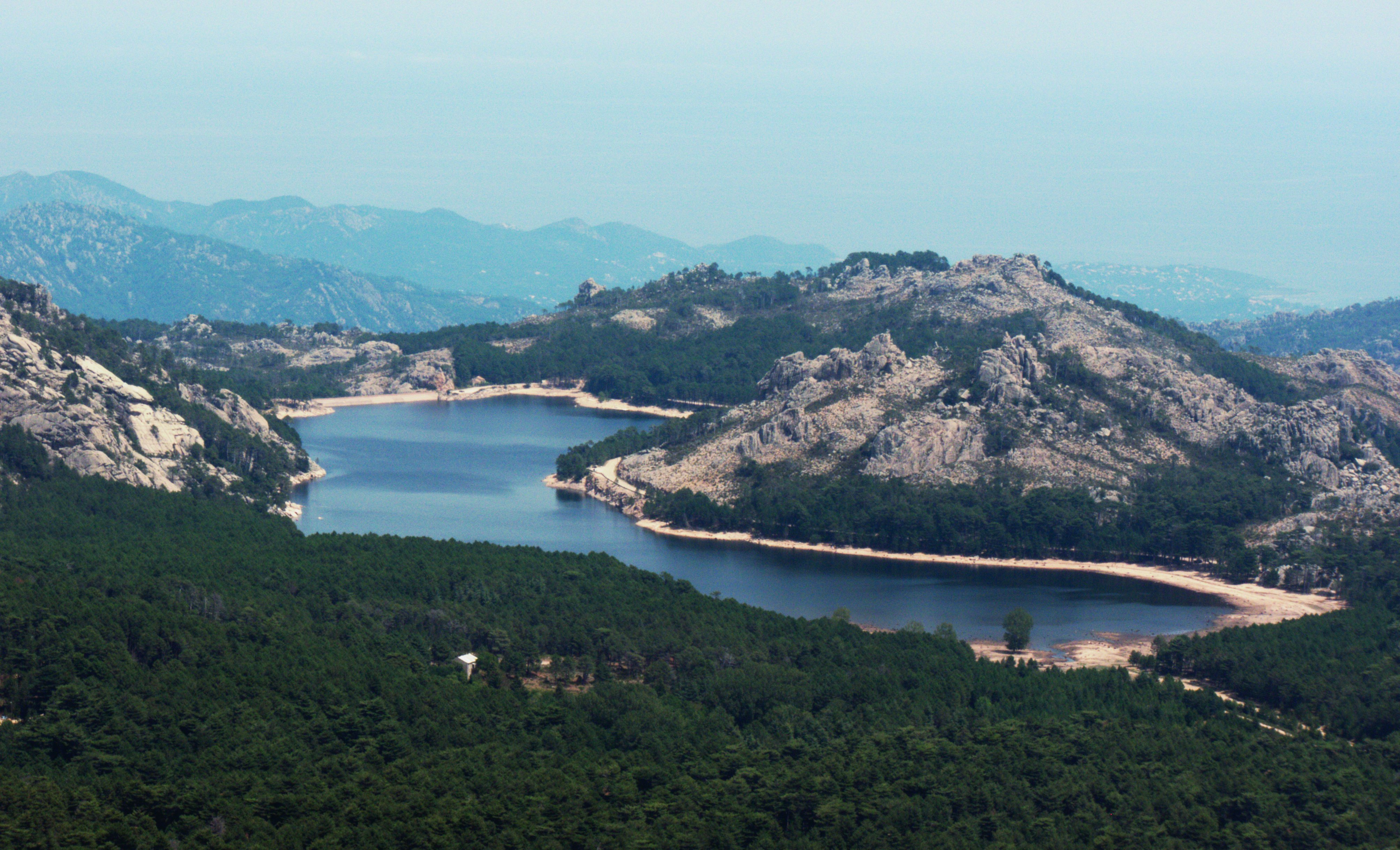
- Barrage de l'Ospédale

- Location within Corsica Location within France
- Location: Corse-du-Sud, Corsica
- Coordinates: 41.6672°N 9.2053°E
- Type: Reservoir
- Basin countries: France
- Water volume: 2,860,000 m^{3} (2,320 acre⋅ft)

The Ospedale Reservoir (French: Réservoir de l'Ospedale or Lac de l'Ospedale) is a reservoir in the Corse-du-Sud department of France on the island of Corsica. It holds drinking water for the southeast of the island, including Porto-Vecchio. It is surrounded by a forest that has been designated a Zone naturelle d'intérêt écologique, faunistique et floristique (ZNIEFF).

== Location ==
The Ospedale Reservoir is in the commune of Porto-Vecchio to the north of the village of L'Ospedale. L'Ospedale (Corsican: U Spidali) is a small mountain village at an altitude of 900 metres (3,000 ft). Its name means "hospital", since it was once the location of a regional hospital. The reservoir is formed by a dam (Barrage de l'Ospedale) on the Ruisseau de Palavesani, a tributary of the Oso river. It is southeast of the 1,213 metres (3,980 ft) Punta di U Corbu. The D368 road runs along its southeast shore.

== Dam ==
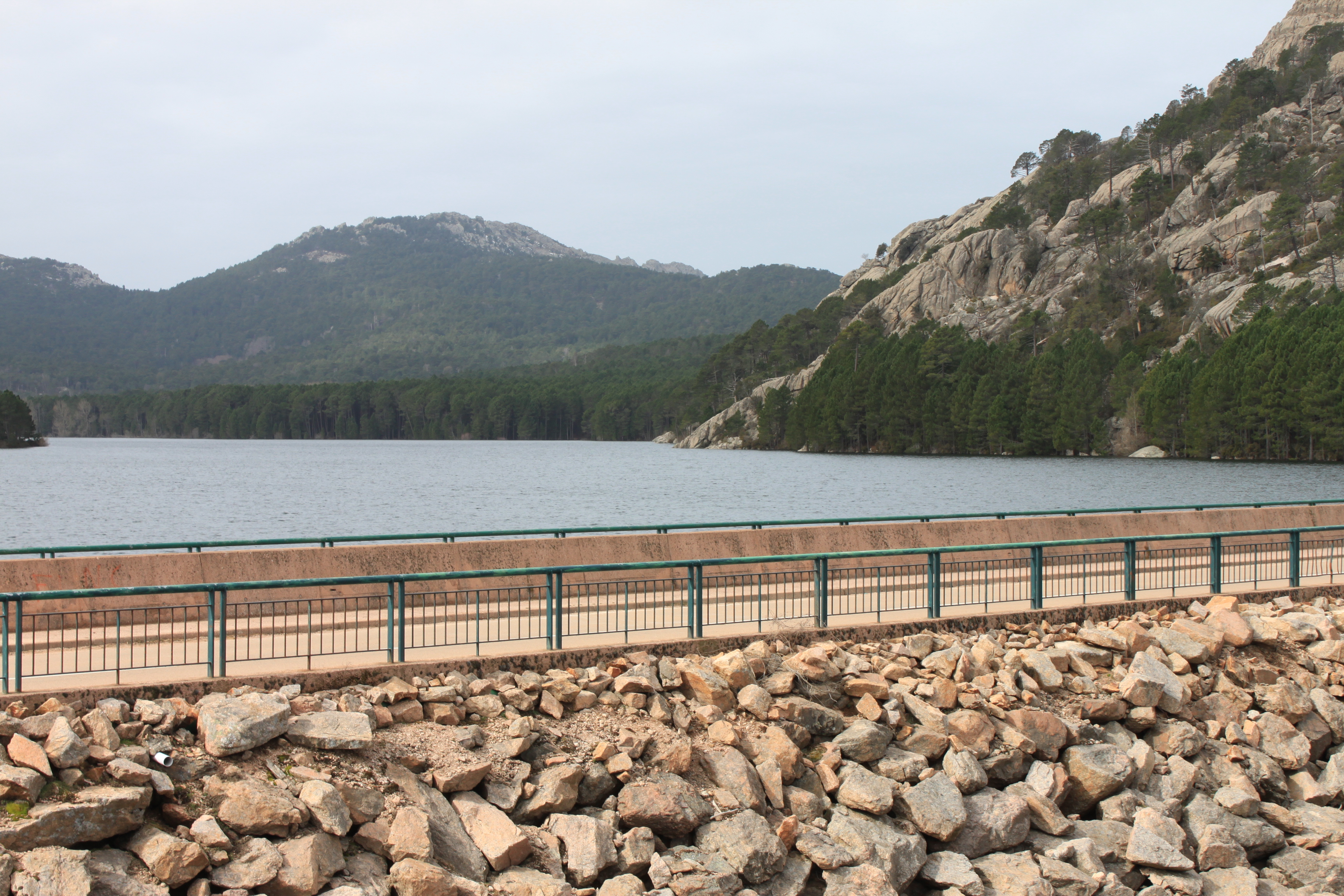
D368 road along the dam

The dam was built in the late 1970s using levée techniques. It came into service in 1979 and is operated by the Office d’Equipement Hydraulique de Corse. It is a riprap structure 26 metres (85 ft) high and 135 metres (443 ft) long that impounds 2,860,000 cubic metres (101,000,000 cu ft) of water. The upstream dam wall was made impermeable by a bituminous geomembrane protected by precast concrete blocks. The crest elevation is 951 metres (3,120 ft).

The dam is subject to a complete inspection every ten years. Depending on the amount of rain during the summer and the number of tourists (who drink the water) it may or may not be necessary to drain water from the reservoir.

== Reservoir ==
The reservoir covers 46 hectares (110 acres) within a 2.6 square kilometres (1.0 sq mi) watershed. The reservoir holds the main water reserve for the Porto-Vecchio region. It supplies drinking water to the whole of the Extrême Sud region. The reservoir is filled by a pipe carrying water from the Asinao stream (Ruisseau de l'Asinao), which can only carry about 500,000 cubic metres (18,000,000 cu ft) of water per month. In years of low rainfall this can cause problems during the summer tourist season.

The articial lake is surrounded by a landscape of rocky scree and a forest of laricio pines and beeches. It has become became a tourist spot within the beautiful 733 hectares (1,810 acres) Ospedale Forest (Forêt de l’Ospedale). However, swimming is prohibited since the lake is a source of drinking water.

== ZNIEFF ==
The reservoir and surrounding forest have been designated a type 1 continental Zone naturelle d'intérêt écologique, faunistique et floristique (ZNIEFF). The ZNIEFF includes the Natura 2000 Zone "Forêt de l'Ospédale", the lake and its surroundings, the left bank of the lake where bats roost and an extension towards the northwest holding Yew habitats. It covers 926.94 hectares (2,290.5 acres) and includes parts of the communes of San-Gavino-di-Carbini, Carbini, Porto-Vecchio and Levie.

The ZNIEFF is in Crystalline Corsica, a large granite massif that is altered on the surface and has some fractures and veins of quartz. Where the bedrock is exposed it is pink granite, or leucogranite, rich in feldspathic minerals. Altitudes range from 946 to 1,314 metres (3,104 to 4,311 ft) The forest has some islets of Yew, but is dominated by pine.

The ZNIEFF is a biotope favored by the Corsican nuthatch (Sitta whiteheadi), the only bird that is endemic to France. It is also home to golden eagle (Aquila chrysaetos) and long-eared owl (Asio otus). It has the only breeding colony of grey long-eared bat (Plecotus austriacus) found in Corsica. It is sometimes visited by mouflons (Ovis gmelini), and is potentially important for this species to repopulate its original range. The site holds all species of Corsican amphibians, and contains several reptiles and amphibians of European interest including European leaf-toed gecko (Euleptes europaea), Corsican painted frog (Discoglossus montalentii), Tyrrhenian painted frog (Discoglossus sardus) and Corsican brook salamander (Euproctus montanus). The area is also home to protected insects such as Corsican swallowtail (Papilio hospiton), Corsican fritillary (Fabriciana elisa) and Rosalia longicorn (Rosalia alpin).

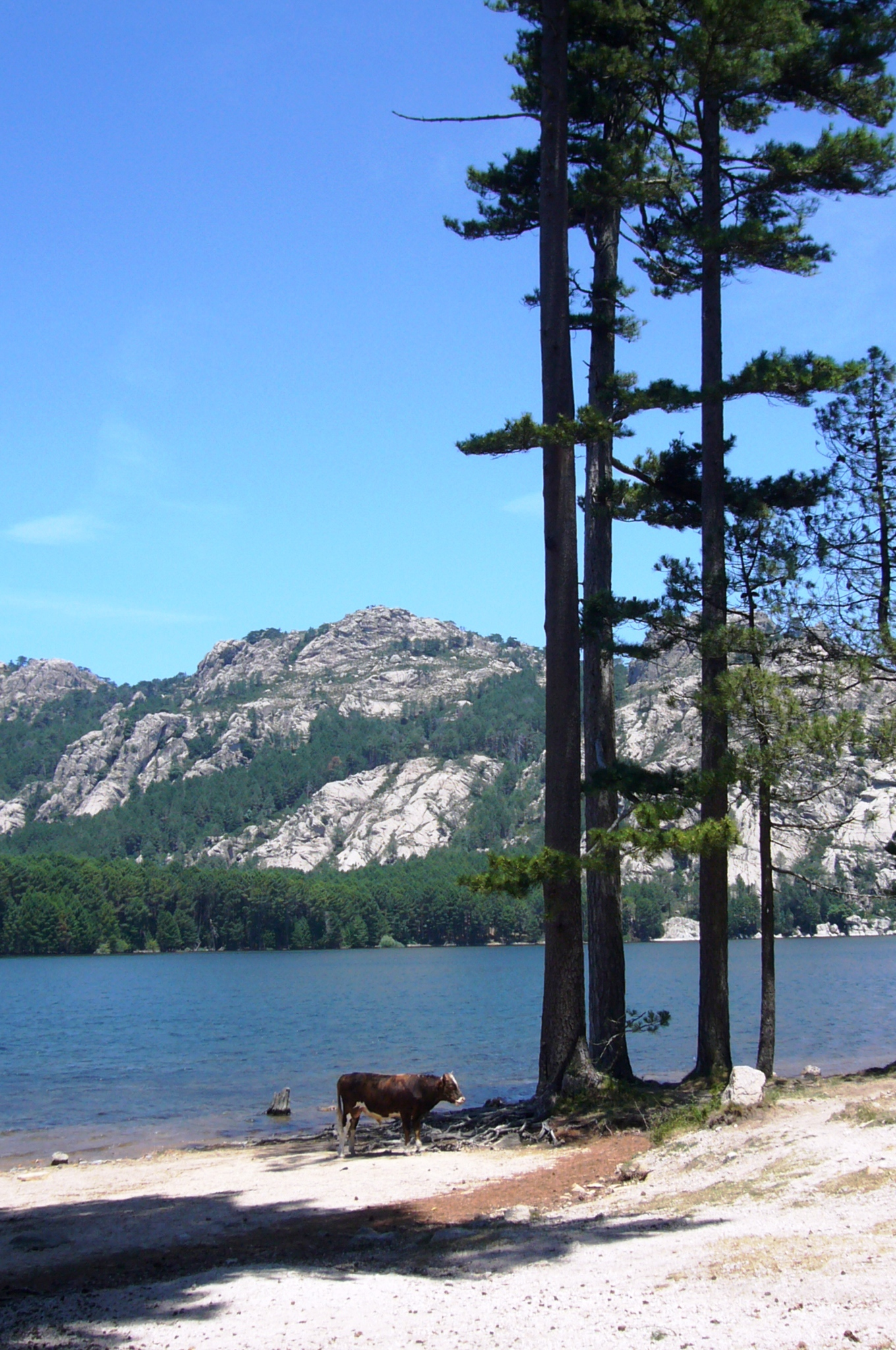
View from the woods

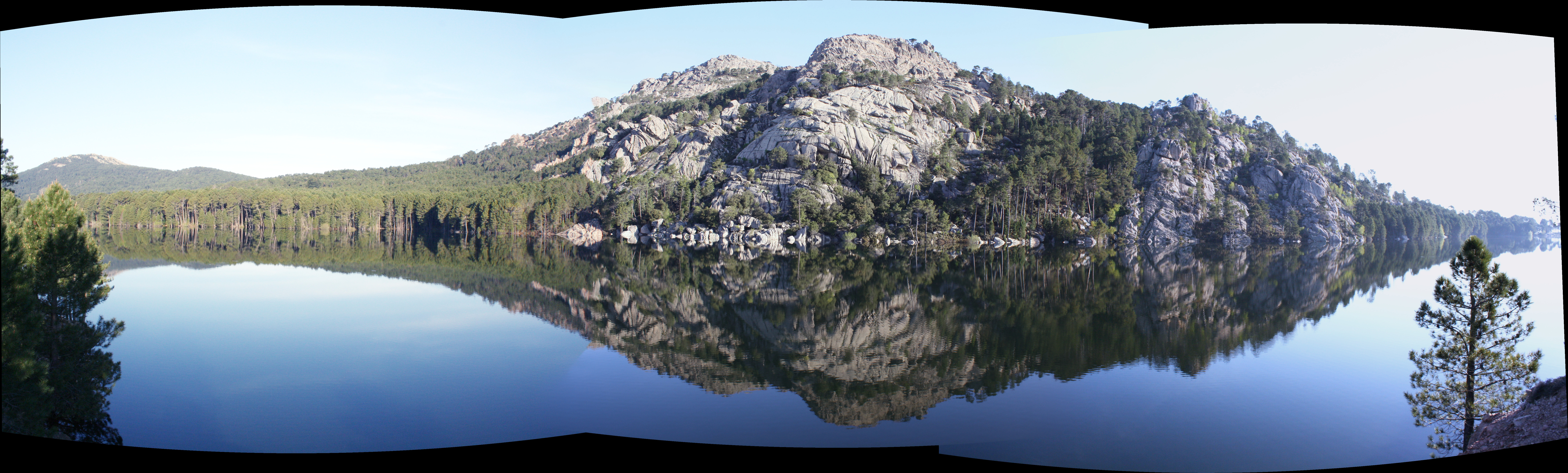
Panoramic view

== See also ==
- List of waterbodies of Corse-du-Sud

== Sources ==
- "Barrage de l'Ospedale", Alta Rocca Tourisme (in French), 4 December 2017
- Blanchard, Maxime (21 September 2015), "Le barrage de l'Ospedale sous l'œil des experts", Corse Matin (in French)
- Corse : Barrage d'Ospedale (in French), CFBR Comité Français des Barrages et Réservoirs
- Groupe Chiropteres Corse (2020), 940030502, Reservoir Ospedale, Foret Autour Du Lac (PDF) (in French), Paris: INPN, SPN-MNHN, pp. 13 pages
- "Lac de l'Ospedale: randonnée, balade et activités sportives", Buger et Voyager (in French), 7 February 2020
- Luciani, Saveriu (2016), Alimentation en eau, situation et perspectives (in French), Office d’Equipement Hydraulique de Corse
- l'Ospedale (in French), Office de Tourisme Intercommunal Porto Vecchio
- Rupture de barrage (PDF) (in French), Ville de Porto-Vecchio, 2021
- "Way: Ospedale Lake (31574506)", OpenStreetMap
