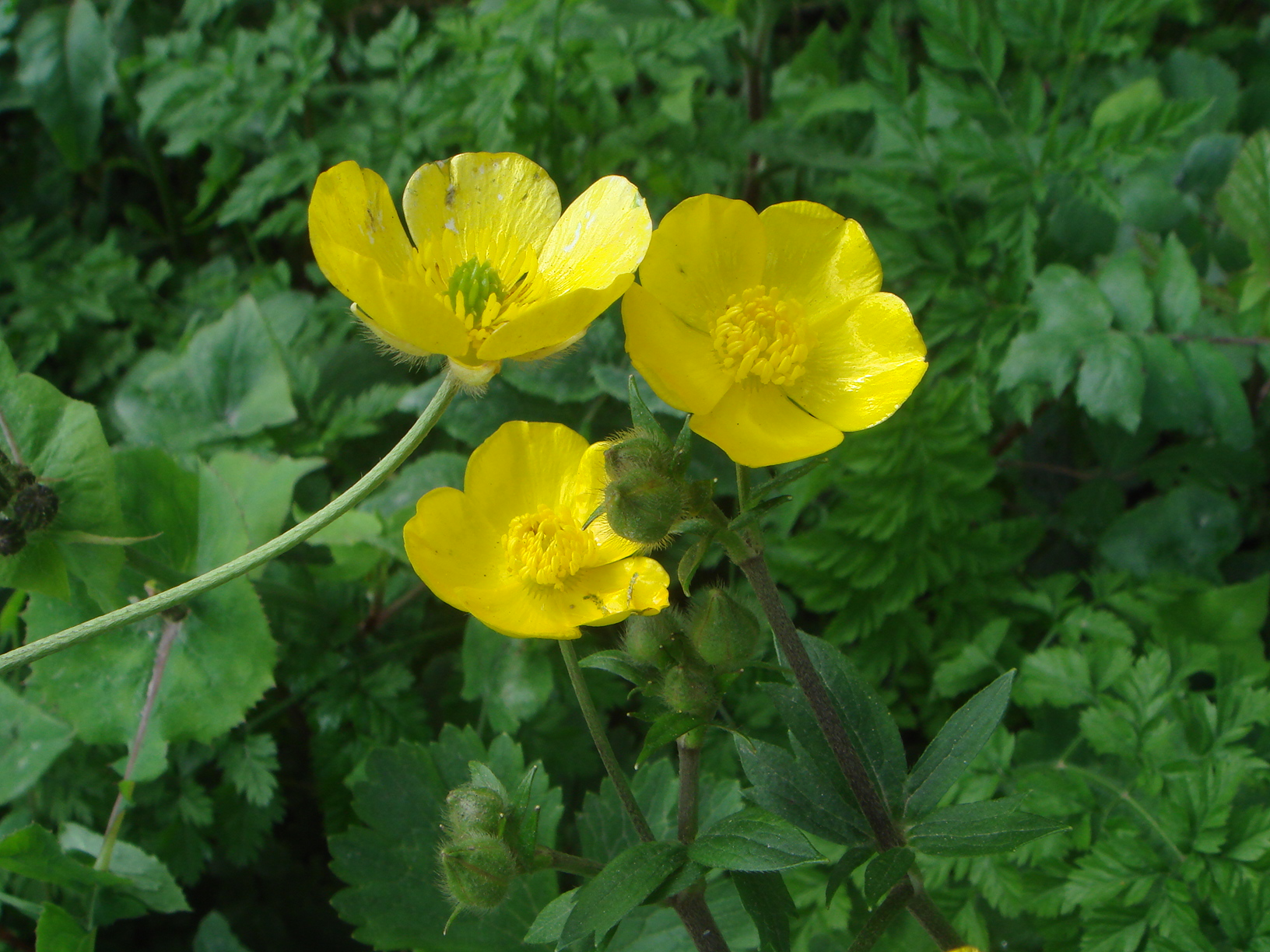

Scientific classification
- Kingdom: Plantae
- Clade: Tracheophytes
- Clade: Angiosperms
- Clade: Eudicots
- Order: Ranunculales
- Family: Ranunculaceae
- Genus: Ranunculus
- Species: R. macrophyllus

Binomial name
- Ranunculus macrophyllus Desf.

Subspecies
- Ranunculus macrophyllus subsp. barceloi (Grau) Romo; Ranunculus macrophyllus subsp. macrophyllus

Synonyms
- Ranunculus creticus var. macrophyllus (Desf.) DC.; Ranunculus palustris subsp. macrophyllus (Desf.) Ball; Ranunculus palustris subsp. macrophyllus (Desf.) Nyman

= Ranunculus macrophyllus =

Species of plant

Ranunculus macrophyllus is a species of flowering plant in the family Ranunculaceae. It is a perennial native to southwestern Europe (Portugal, Spain, the Balearic Islands, Corsica, and Sardinia) and North Africa (Morocco, Algeria, Tunisia, and Libya).

Two subspecies are accepted.

- Ranunculus macrophyllus subsp. barceloi (Grau) Romo – Balearic Islands (Mallorca)
- Ranunculus macrophyllus subsp. macrophyllus – entire range

== Sources ==
This article incorporates text from a free content work. Licensed under CC0 (license statement/permission). Text taken from Ranunculus macrophyllus. Encyclopedia of Life.
