= Francolu =

Francolu Rau
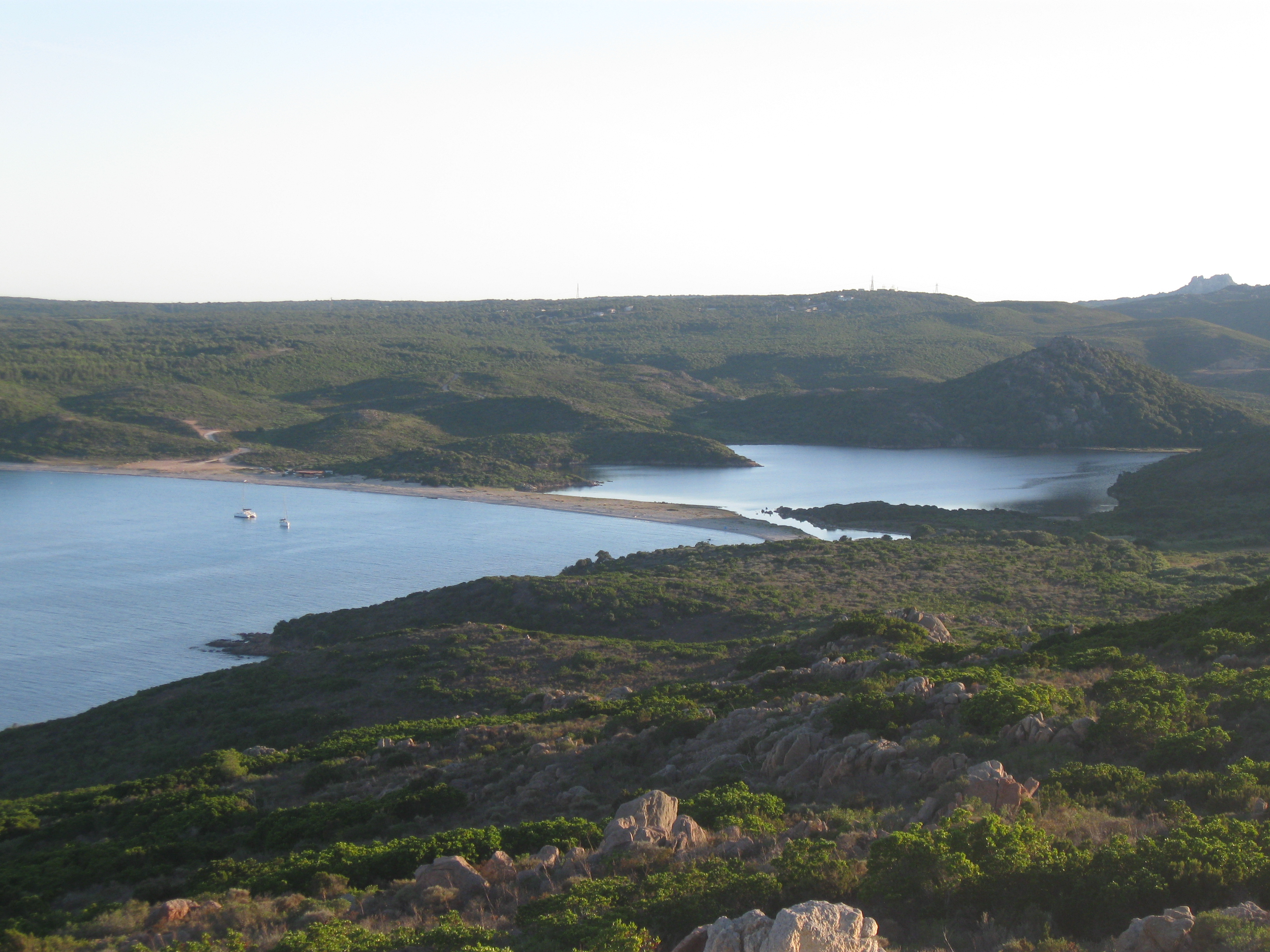
- Beach and lagoon of Balistra

- Location within Corsica Location within France
- Native name: Ruisseau de Francolu (French)

Location
- Country: France
- Region: Corsica
- Department: Corse-du-Sud

Physical characteristics
- Mouth: Tyrrhenian Sea
  - coordinates: 41.4425°N 9.2238°E
- Length: 11.24 kilometres (6.98 mi)

The Francolu (Corsican: Francolu Rau, French: Ruisseau de Francolu) is a coastal stream in the southeast of the department of Corse-du-Sud, Corsica, France.

== Course ==
The Francolu is 11.24 kilometres (6.98 mi) long. It flows through the commune of Bonifacio. The stream rises to the south of the hamlet of Sapareddi. It flows with wide loops in a generally south-southeast direction, passes under the T10 coastal road, and enters the Étang de Balistra, a lagoon. The lagoon drains into the sea through a channel at the north end of the Plage de Balistra.

Where the Ruisseau de Francolo enters the lagoon through a swamp there is an extensive sansouire (salt-tolerant grasses) mixed with spiny rush and sea rush. Shorebirds frequent this area. The open water is used by great cormorants and great crested grebes, and sometimes by diving ducks. The Köppen climate classification is Csa : Hot-summer Mediterranean climate.

== Hydrology ==
Measurements of the river flow were taken at the Balistra station from 1969 to 1980. The watershed above this station covers 29 square kilometres (11 sq mi). The average flow of water throughout the year was 0.2 cubic metres per second (7.1 cu ft/s).

Average flow (cubic meters per second) by month for the period 1968 to 1980
Month	Flow
Jan	0.49
Feb	0.46
Mar	0.33
Apr	0.33
May	0.19
Jun	0.02
Jul	0.003
Aug	0.16
Sep	0.01
Oct	0.01
Nov	0.17
Dec	0.26

== Tributaries ==
The following streams (ruisseaux) are tributaries of the Francolu (ordered by length) and sub-tributaries:

- Truone: 9 km (5.6 mi)
- Riccinu: 6 km (3.7 mi)
  - Canale d'Oru: 1 km (0.62 mi)
- Stencia: 6 km (3.7 mi)
- Rotonda: 2 km (1.2 mi)
- Saparelli: 2 km (1.2 mi)

== Sources ==
- "Étang de Balistra", Pôle lagunes (in French)
- "Francolu Rau, Département de la Corse-du-Sud, Corse, France", Mindat
- "Le Francolo à Bonifacio [Balistra]", eaufrance (in French), © Ministère de l'Ecologie, du Développement Durable et de l'Energie
- "Relation: Ruisseau de Francolu (9176269)", OpenStreetMap
- "Ruisseau de Francolu", Sandre (in French)
