= Guagno (river) =

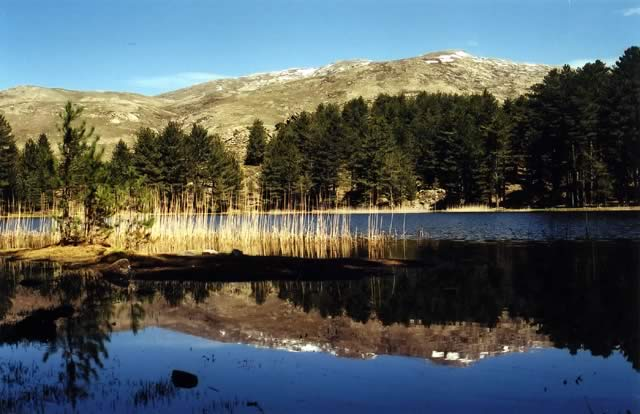
- Lac de Creno on the Ruisseau de Creno, a tributary

- Location within Corsica Location within France

Location
- Country: France
- Region: Corsica
- Department: Corse-du-Sud

Physical characteristics
- Mouth: Liamone
  - coordinates: 42.1825°N 8.8673°E
- Length: 18.51 kilometres (11.50 mi)

Basin features
- Progression: Liamone→ Mediterranean Sea

The Guagno (French: Rivière de Guagno, Fiume Grosso) is a river in the north of the department of Corse-du-Sud, Corsica, France. It is a tributary of the river Liamone.

== Course ==
The Guagno is 18.51 kilometres (11.50 mi) long. It crosses the communes of Guagno, Letia, Murzo, Orto, Poggiolo and Soccia. The river rises in the commune of Guagno south of the 2,496 metres (8,189 ft) A Maniccia, near the boundary of Haute-Corse to the east. It flows west, receiving tributaries mostly from the north. It passes the village of Guagno to the south, and the vollages of Orto and Poggiolo to the north, then flows past Guagno-les-Bains to its confluence with the Liamone. For most of its course above Guagno-les-Bains the river is called U Fiume Grosso. The D23 road follows to south bank of the lower river up to Guagno, and the D223 follows the north bank up to Orto.

== Valley ==
The Guagno / Fiume Grosso runs through the "Sorru in su" unit of the Liamone landscape. The Sorru in su valley is similar to the Cruzzini valley, with the same orientation and afforestation, but where the Cruzzini leads into the Monte d'Oro massif, the Sorru in su leads into the Monte Rotondo Massif. A high ridge separates the two valleys, running from the main ridge via Monte Tretorre to Monte Cervellu. The large village of Guagno is in the center of the main Fiume Grossu valley, while Soccia and Orto are in secondary valleys from which trails lead to the high mountains. Although beautifully preserved, the villages are underdeveloped for tourism.

The valley bottoms are mostly covered in maquis shrubland and communal meadows for grazing. There are chestnut groves around the villages. The slopes are wooded with holm oak (Quercus ilex), chestnut (Castanea), maritime pine (Pinus pinaster) and laricio pine (Pinus nigra), while the rocky ridges descending from the Monte Rotondo Massif are bare. The spa at Guagno les Bains was built in the 19th century but now seems abandoned. The sulfurous water, helpful in treating rheumatism, have been known for at least five centuries.

== Tributaries ==
The following streams (ruisseaux) are tributaries of the Guagno (ordered by length) and sub-tributaries:

- Filiccioni: 14 km (8.7 mi)
  - Crualu: 3 km (1.9 mi)
    - Tassi: 1 km (0.62 mi)
  - Iliarotta: 3 km (1.9 mi)
- Albelli: 10 km (6.2 mi)
- Lageri: 5 km (3.1 mi)
- Petra-Longa: 4 km (2.5 mi)
- Bronco: 4 km (2.5 mi)
- Creno: 3 km (1.9 mi)
- Rioseccu: 3 km (1.9 mi)
- Fumicellu: 2 km (1.2 mi)
- Porcili: 2 km (1.2 mi)
- Pascione: 2 km (1.2 mi)
- Piscia Maltata: 1 km (0.62 mi)

== Sources ==
- "Liamone – 3.15", Atlas des paysages de la Region Corse (PDF) (in French), Direction régionale de l’environnement, de l’aménagement et du logement Corse
- "Relation: Rivière de Guagno (9256568)", OpenStreetMap
- "Rivière de Guagno", Sandre (in French)
