= Arro =

Commune in Corsica, France

- Commune
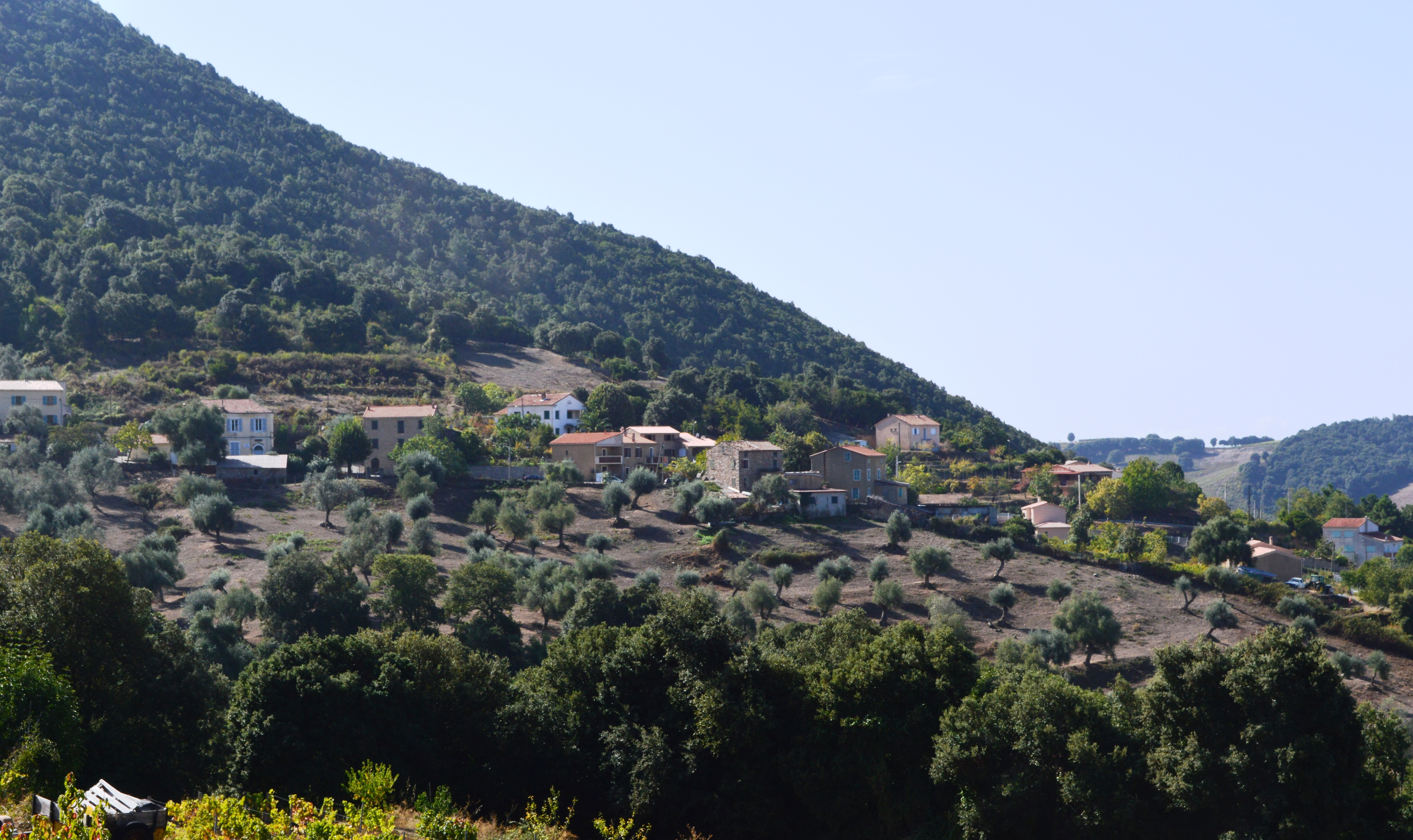
- A general view of Arro
- Location of Arro
- Location within France Location within Corsica
- Coordinates: 42°05′37″N 8°48′52″E
- Country: France
- Region: Corsica
- Department: Corse-du-Sud
- Arrondissement: Ajaccio
- Canton: Sevi-Sorru-Cinarca
- Intercommunality: Spelunca-Liamone

Government
  - Mayor (2020–2026): Christian Angelini
- Area^{1}: 0.8 km^{2} (0.31 sq mi)
- Elevation: 150 m (490 ft)
- Highest elevation: 867 m (2,844 ft)
- Lowest elevation: 12 m (39 ft)
- Population (2023): 80
  - Density: 100/km^{2} (260/sq mi)
- Time zone: UTC+01:00 (CET)
  - Summer (DST): UTC+02:00 (CEST)
- INSEE/Postal code: 2A022 /20151
- ^{1} French Land Register data, which excludes lakes, ponds, glaciers > 1 km^{2} (0.386 sq mi or 247 acres) and river estuaries.

Arro (French pronunciation: [aʁo]; Corsican: Arru) is a commune in the French department of Corse-du-Sud, collectivity and island of Corsica.

== Geography ==
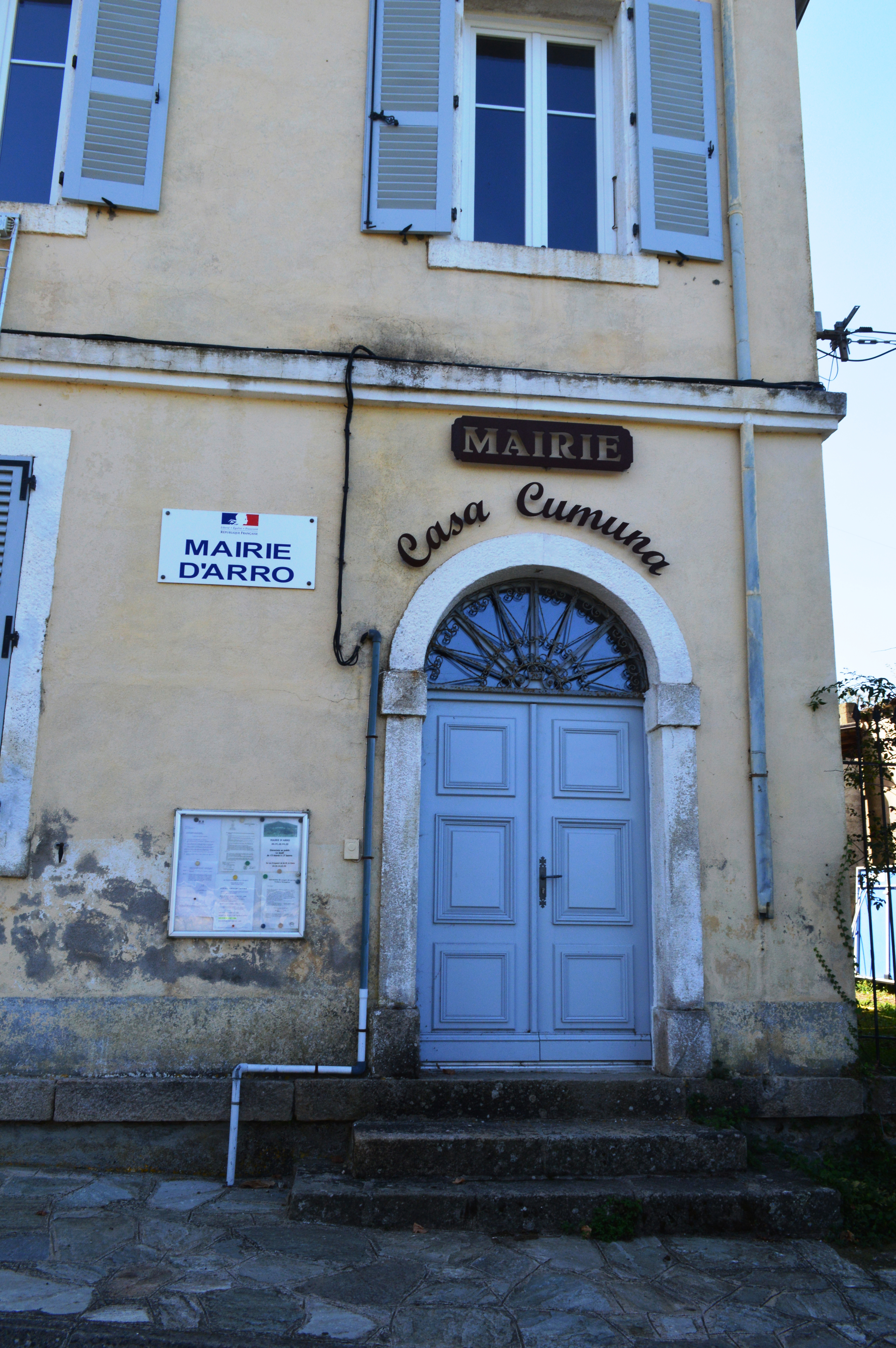
The Town Hall

Arro is located some 25 km north by north-east of Ajaccio and 10 km south of Vico. Access to the commune is by the D1 road from Ambiegna in the south passing through the heart of the commune and continuing north to Arbori. The D125 branches off the D1 in the south of the commune and goes north-east through the village then by a tortuous route to join the D4 south of Azzana. The commune is rugged and heavily forested.

The river Liamone forms the northern border of the commune flowing west to the Mediterranean.

== Administration ==
List of Successive Mayors

| From | To | Name | Party |
|---|---|---|---|
| 2001 | 2026 | Christian Angelini | DVD |

== Demography ==
Historical population

| Year | Pop. | ±% p.a. |
|---|---|---|
| 1800 | 127 | — |
| 1821 | 136 | +0.33% |
| 1846 | 197 | +1.49% |
| 1872 | 243 | +0.81% |
| 1901 | 276 | +0.44% |
| 1926 | 161 | −2.13% |
| 1946 | 136 | −0.84% |
| 1962 | 99 | −1.97% |
| 1968 | 95 | −0.69% |

| Year | Pop. | ±% p.a. |
|---|---|---|
| 1975 | 86 | −1.41% |
| 1982 | 70 | −2.90% |
| 1990 | 41 | −6.47% |
| 1999 | 51 | +2.45% |
| 2007 | 73 | +4.58% |
| 2012 | 84 | +2.85% |
| 2017 | 83 | −0.24% |
| 2023 | 80 | −0.61% |

Source: EHESS and INSEE

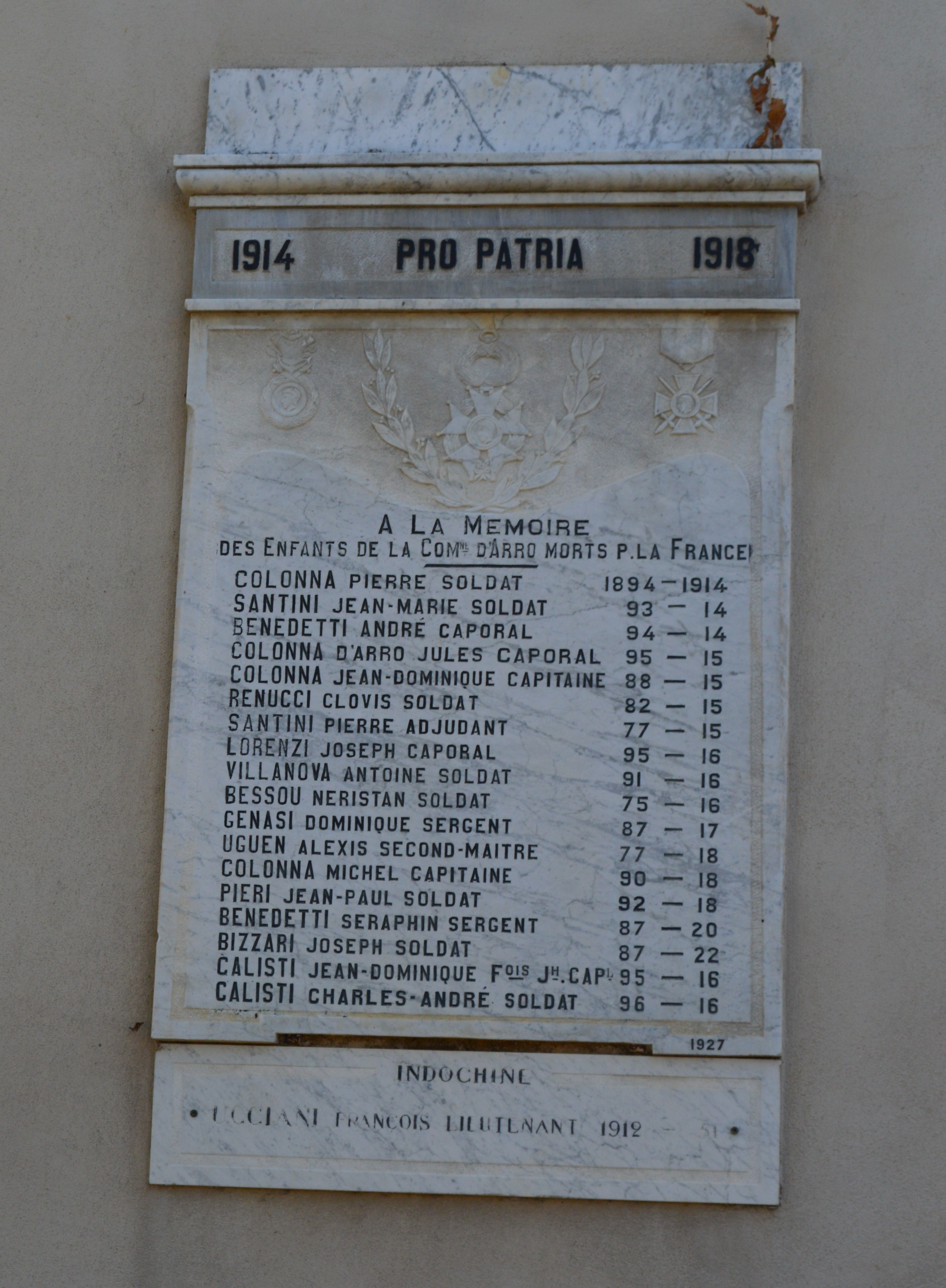
Arro War Memorial

== Culture and heritage ==
=== Civil heritage ===
The commune has many buildings and structures that are registered as historical monuments:

- An old Presbytery (18th century)
- A House (11) (17th century)
- A House (14) (1737)
- A House (16) (18th century)
- The Casa di Cocca House at Lavasina (1951)
- An old Presbytery (19th century)
- A House (20) (17th century)
- A House (22) (17th century)
- A Communal House (18th century)
- The Colonna Family House (27) (1853)
- The Casa di Paoli House (19th century)
- A House (8) (17th century)
- The Colonna Family House (9) (1861)
- The Four à tuiles de Bisorza Oven (18th century)
- A Fountain (1913)
- A Colonna Family Agricultural Storehouse (19th century)
- The old School (1891)
- The Croix de Mission Monumental Cross (1935)
- The Moulin de Balona Flour Mill (1793)
- An old Chestnut Drying Cellar at Moneta (19th century)
- An old Chestnut Drying Cellar at Buscia (19th century)
- An old Chestnut Drying Cellar at Lamosa (19th century)
- Houses in Arro (17th-20th century)

=== Religious heritage ===
The commune has several religious buildings and sites that are registered as historical monuments:

- The Colonna Family Funeral Enclosure (1900). The enclosure contains a Funeral Cross for Paul Colonna (1887) which is registered as an historical object.
- A Cemetery at Sant'Antone (19th century). The cemetery contains several items that are registered as historical objects:
  - A Funeral Cross for Marie Antoinette Orazi (1933)
  - A Funeral Cross for Madeleine Santori (1918)
  - A Funeral Cross for Toussainte Santini (1883)
  - A Funeral Cross for Marie Lorenzi (1887)
- The old Parish Church of Saint-Cyr at San-Chirgo (19th century)

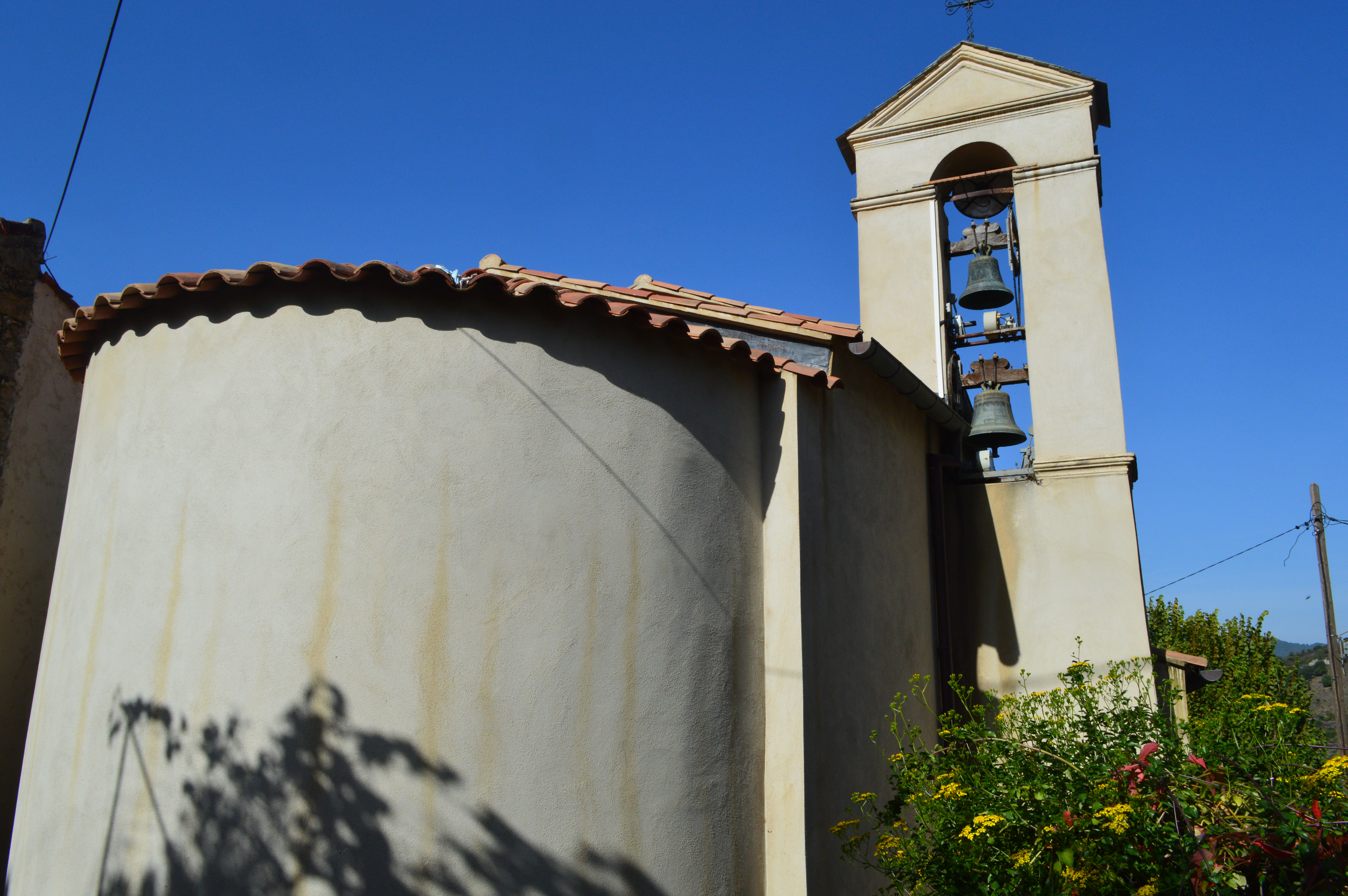
The Parish Church of Saint Nicolas

- The Parish Church of Saint-Nicolas (17th century)

The Church contains many items that are registered as historical objects:

- A Painting: Virgin and child between Saint Nicolas and Saint Cyr (19th century)
- A Bronze Bell (2) (1889)
- A Bronze Bell (1) (1890)
- A Paten (2) (19th century)
- An Altar Painting: Apparition of the Virgin and child to Saints (19th century)
- A Stoup (19th century)
- A Chasuble (2) (19th century)
- A Chasuble (1) (19th century)
- A Chalice (2) (17th century)
- A Sunburst Monstrance (18th century)
- A Devotional Object enclosed in glass (19th century)
- A Chalice (1) (18th century)
- A Paten (1) (19th century)
- A Ciborium (19th century)
- A Church Chandelier (19th century)
- A Baptismal font (18th century)
- The Furniture in the Church

=== Gallery of Historical monuments ===
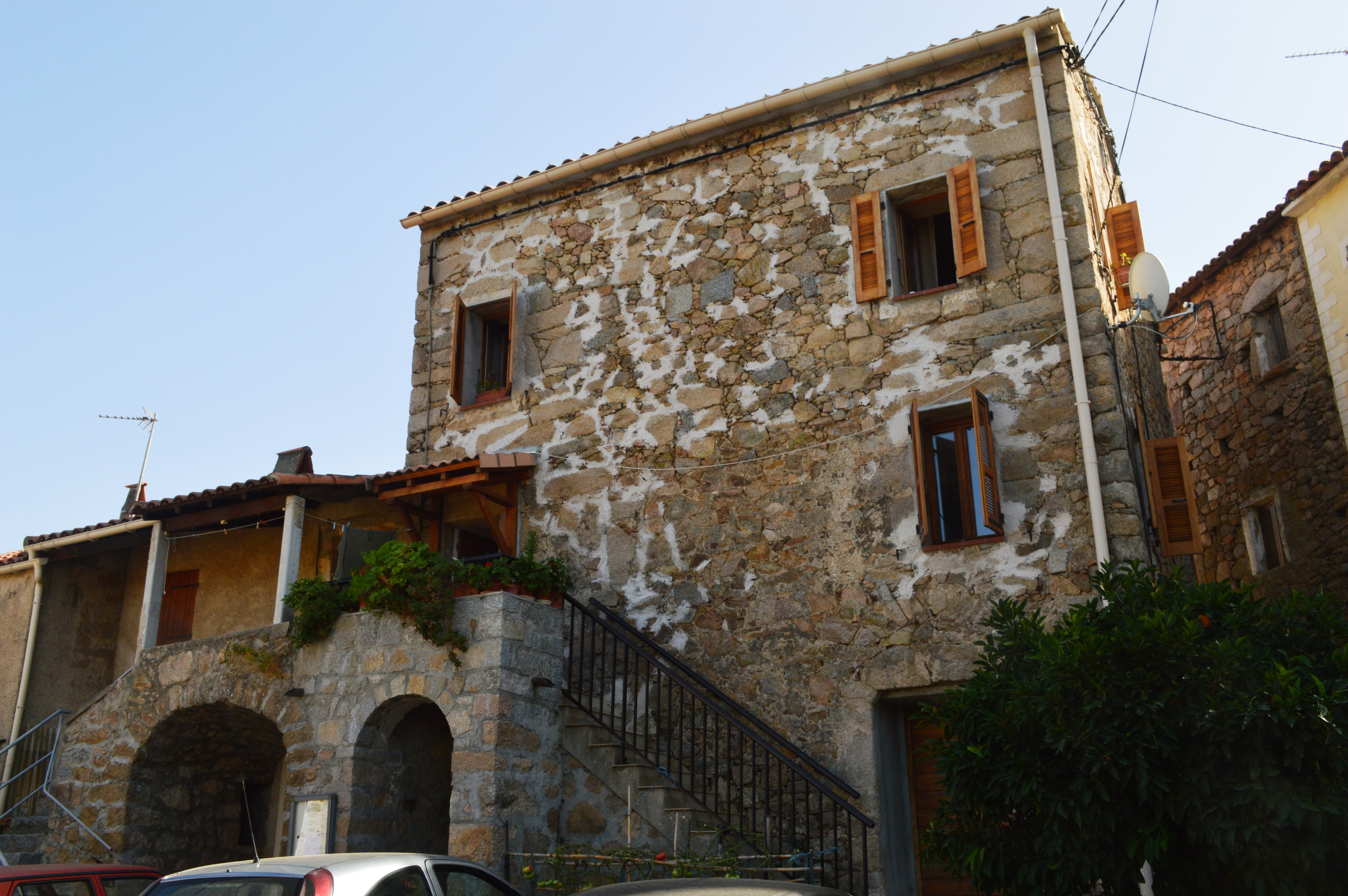
House 11

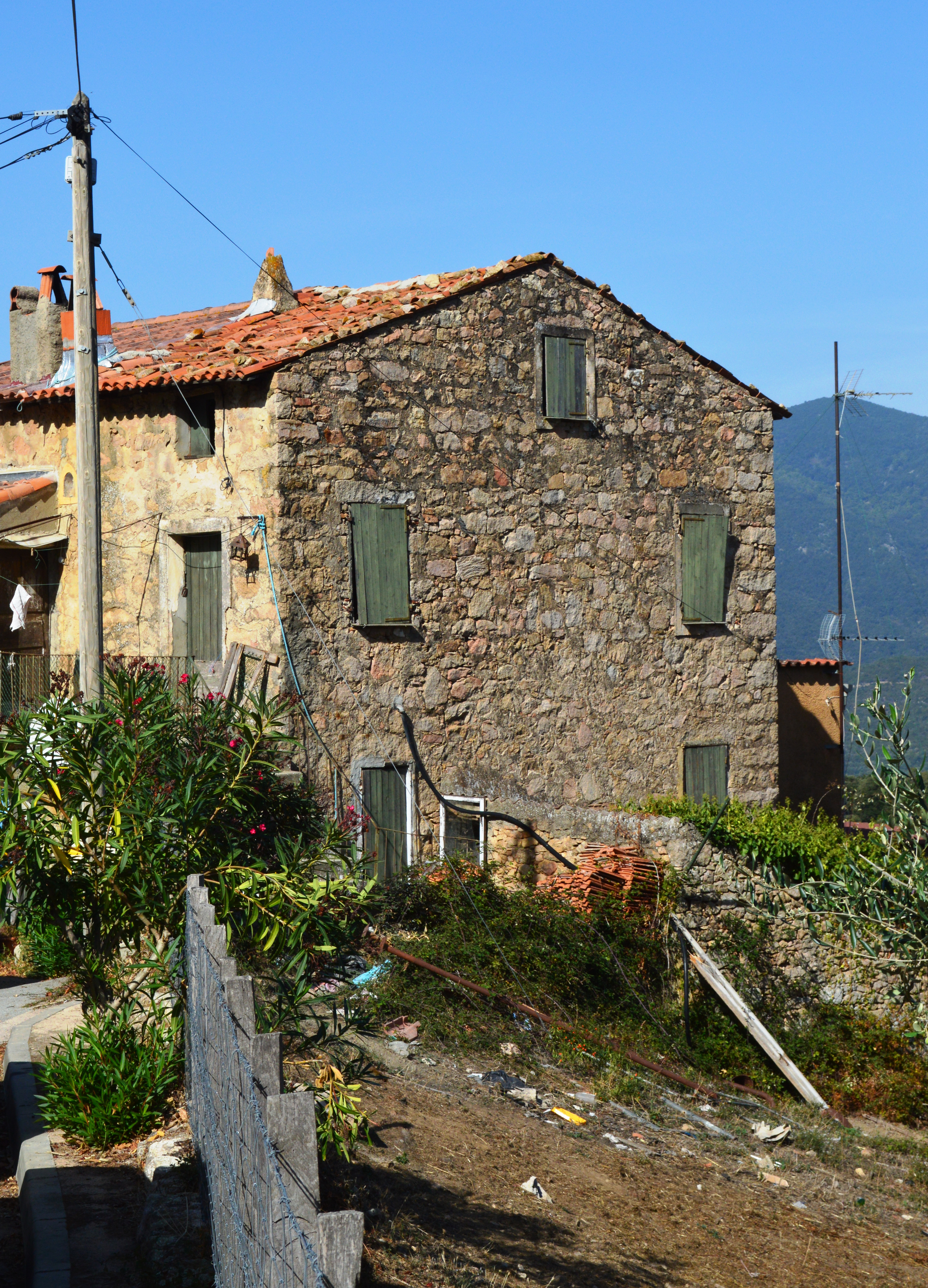
House 8

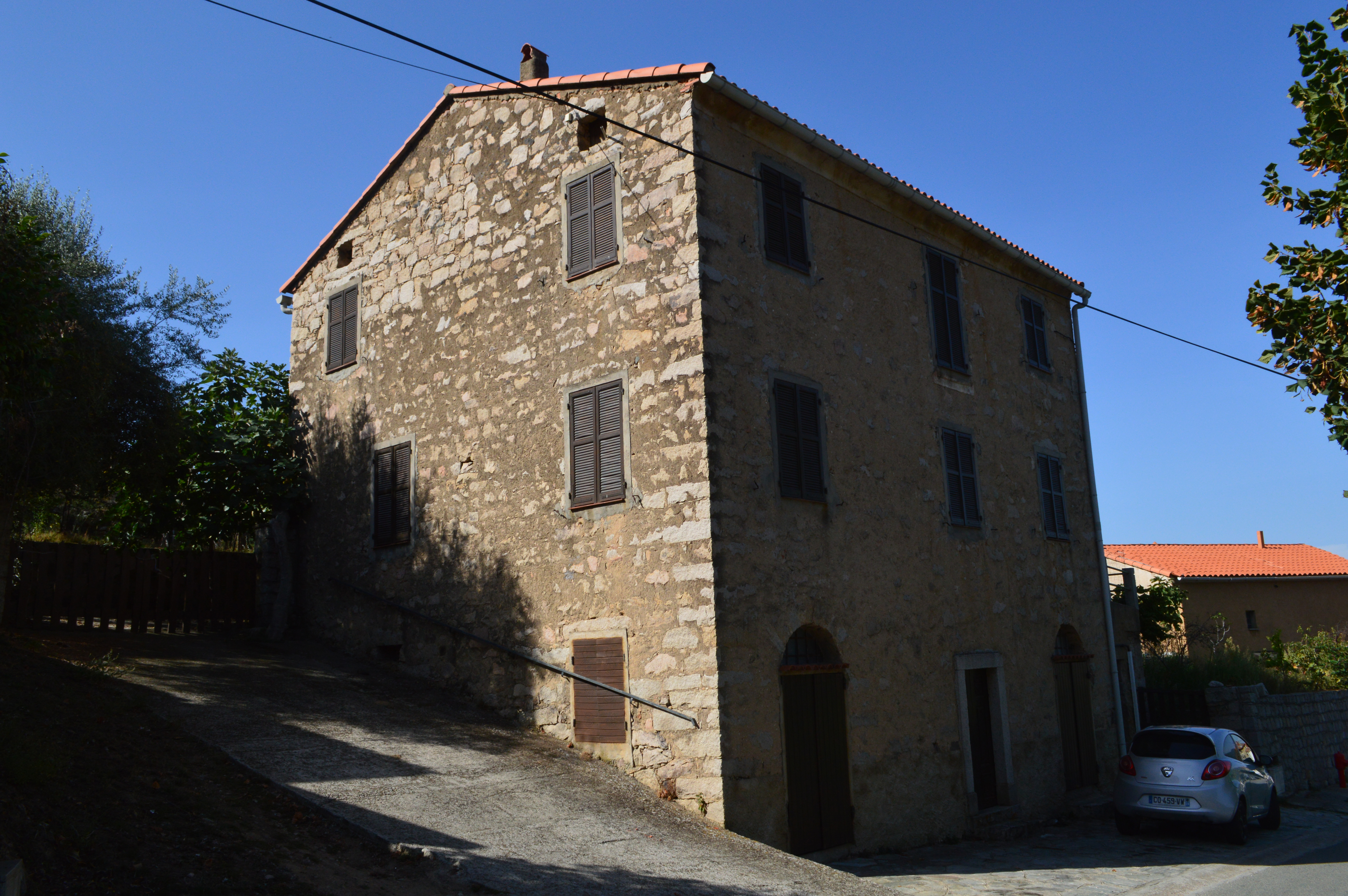
A House in Arro

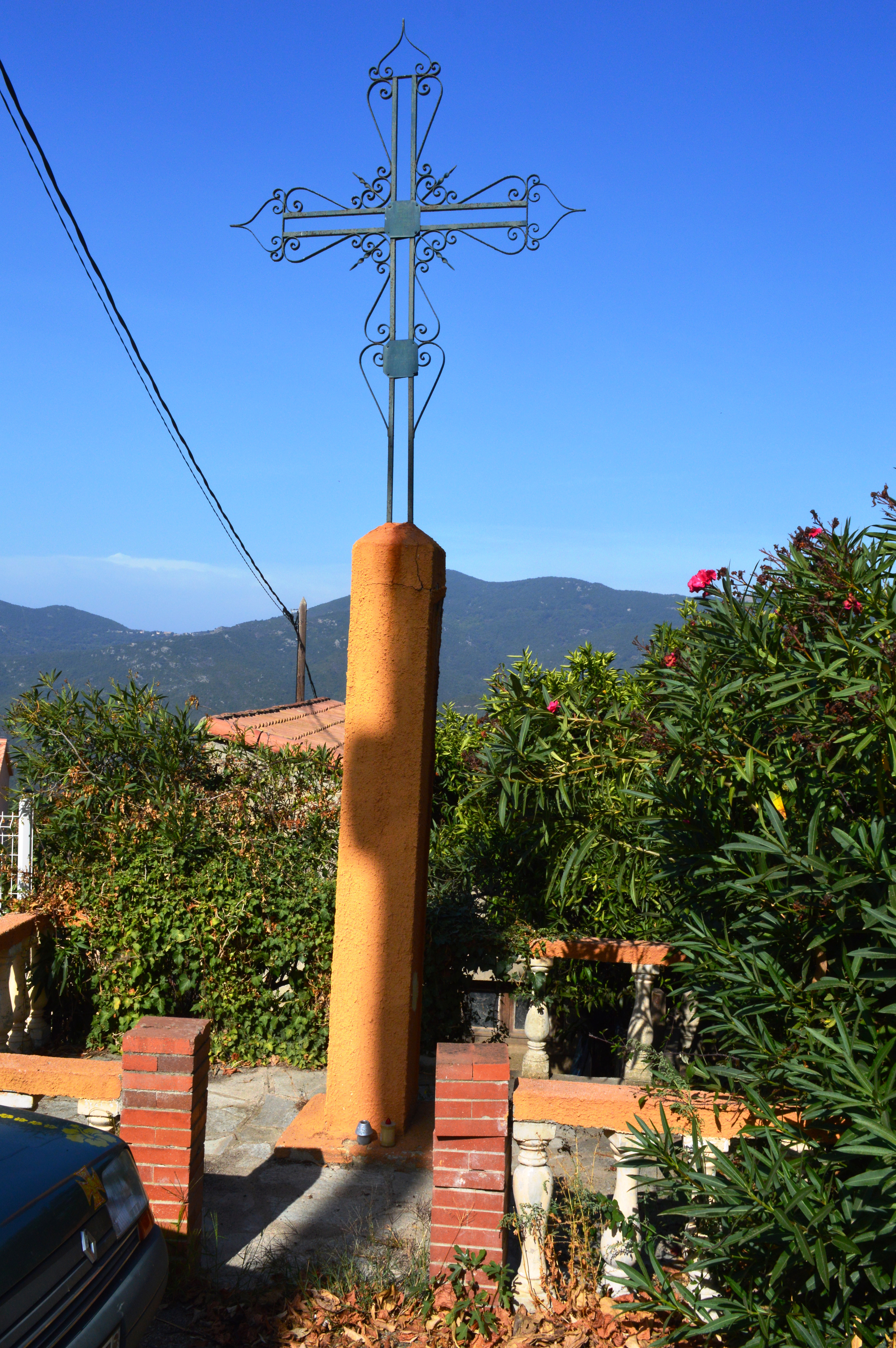
The Croix de Mission Monumental Cross

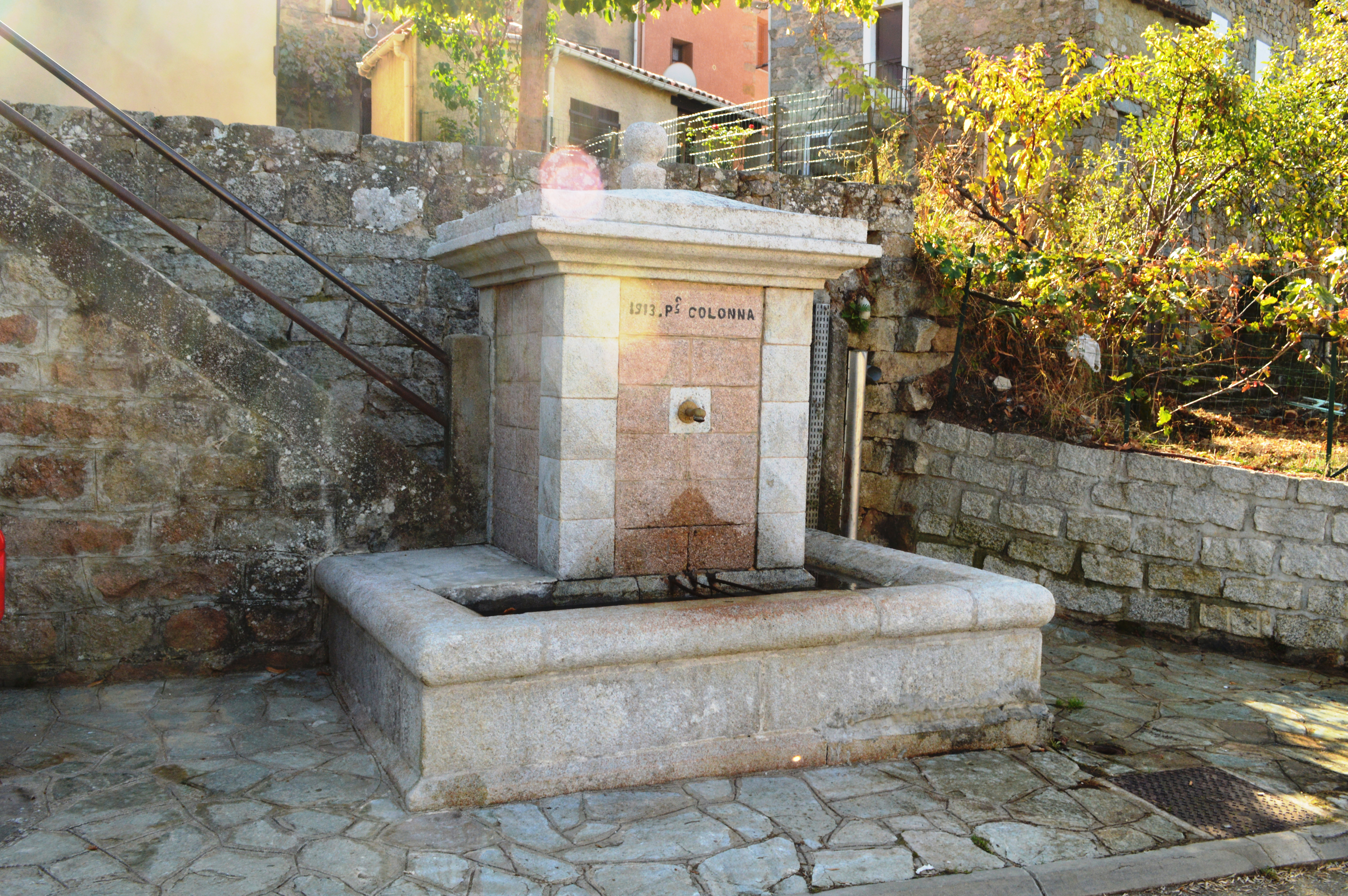
Arro Fountain

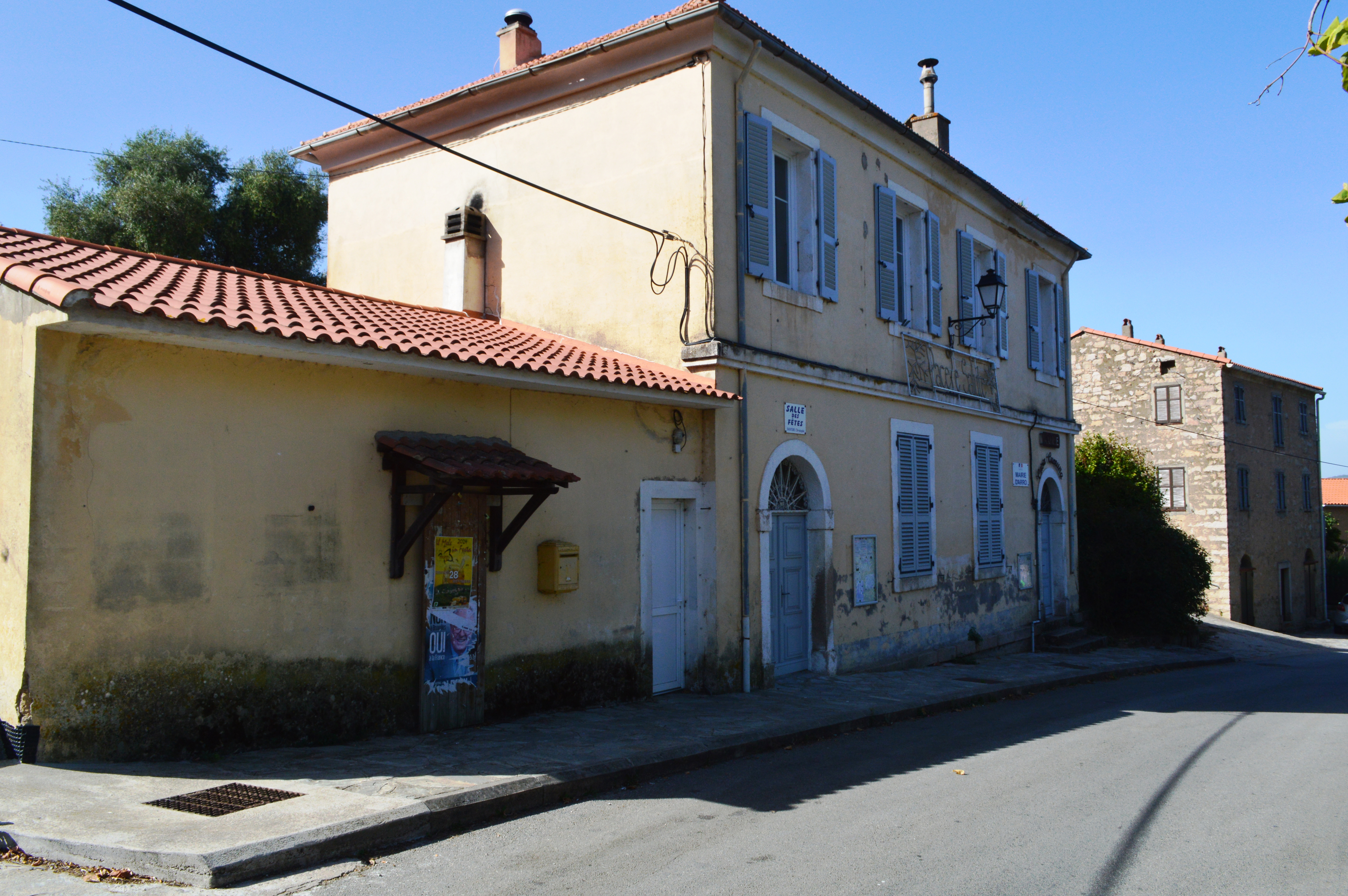
The old school

== See also ==
- Communes of the Corse-du-Sud department
