= Letia =

Commune in Corsica, France

- Commune
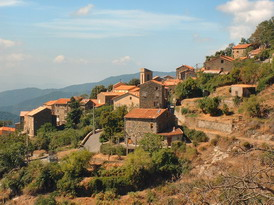
- A view of the village of Letia Saint Roch
- Location of Letia
- Location within France Location within Corsica
- Coordinates: 42°11′29″N 8°50′54″E
- Country: France
- Region: Corsica
- Department: Corse-du-Sud
- Arrondissement: Ajaccio
- Canton: Sevi-Sorru-Cinarca

Government
  - Mayor (2020–2026): Angèle Chiappini
- Area^{1}: 36.44 km^{2} (14.07 sq mi)
- Elevation: 660 m (2,170 ft)
- Highest elevation: 2,084 m (6,837 ft)
- Lowest elevation: 235 m (771 ft)
- Population (2023): 111
  - Density: 3.05/km^{2} (7.89/sq mi)
- Time zone: UTC+01:00 (CET)
  - Summer (DST): UTC+02:00 (CEST)
- INSEE/Postal code: 2A141 /20160
- ^{1} French Land Register data, which excludes lakes, ponds, glaciers > 1 km^{2} (0.386 sq mi or 247 acres) and river estuaries.

Letia is a commune in the Corse-du-Sud department of France on the island of Corsica.

== Population ==
Historical population
Year	Pop.	±% p.a.
1968	285	—
1975	252	−1.74%
1982	204	−2.97%
1990	122	−6.22%
1999	96	−2.63%
2007	109	+1.60%
2012	110	+0.18%
2017	121	+1.92%
2023	111	−1.43%
Source: INSEE

== See also ==
- Communes of the Corse-du-Sud department
