= Ambiegna =

Commune in Corsica, France

- Commune
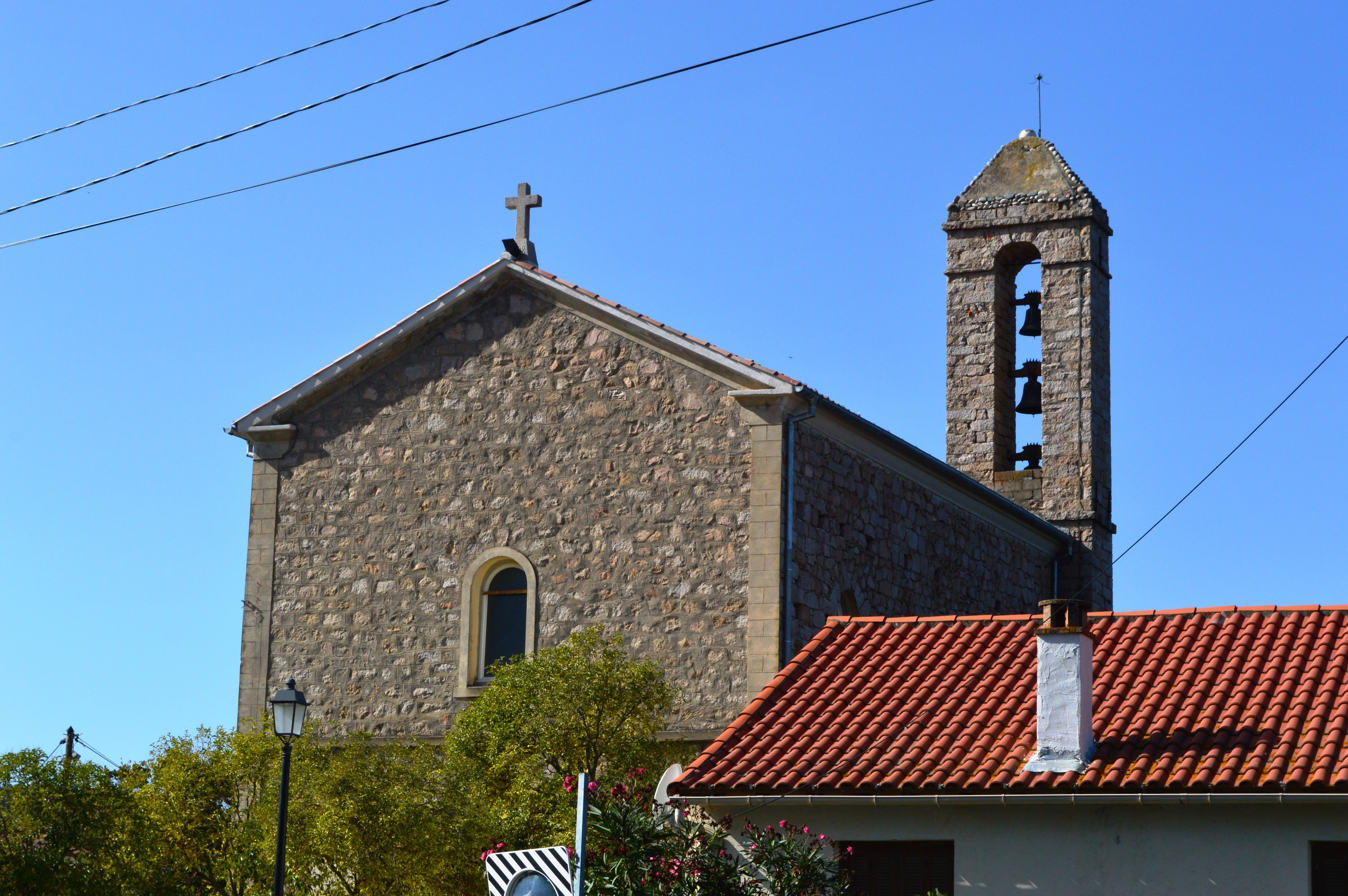
- The church of Saint-Côme and Saint-Damien, in Ambiegna
- Location of Ambiegna
- Location within France Location within Corsica
- Coordinates: 42°05′05″N 8°47′35″E
- Country: France
- Region: Corsica
- Department: Corse-du-Sud
- Arrondissement: Ajaccio
- Canton: Sevi-Sorru-Cinarca
- Intercommunality: Spelunca-Liamone

Government
  - Mayor (2020–2026): Jean-Toussaint Poli
- Area^{1}: 6.12 km^{2} (2.36 sq mi)
- Elevation: 400 m (1,300 ft)
- Highest elevation: 441 m (1,447 ft)
- Lowest elevation: 8 m (26 ft)
- Population (2023): 79
  - Density: 13/km^{2} (33/sq mi)
- Time zone: UTC+01:00 (CET)
  - Summer (DST): UTC+02:00 (CEST)
- INSEE/Postal code: 2A014 /20151
- ^{1} French Land Register data, which excludes lakes, ponds, glaciers > 1 km^{2} (0.386 sq mi or 247 acres) and river estuaries.

Ambiegna is a commune in the Corse-du-Sud department of France on the island of Corsica.

== Geography ==
Ambiegna is located some 25 km in a direct line north of Ajaccio and 5 km east of Sagone. It can be accessed by the D25 road from Casaglione in the south or by the D1 road from Solane in the south-west both going to the village on the eastern side of the commune. The D1 road continues north to Le Truggia by a tortuous route. The commune is remote and rugged with dense forests.

The north-western border of the commune is formed by the river Liamone.

== Administration ==
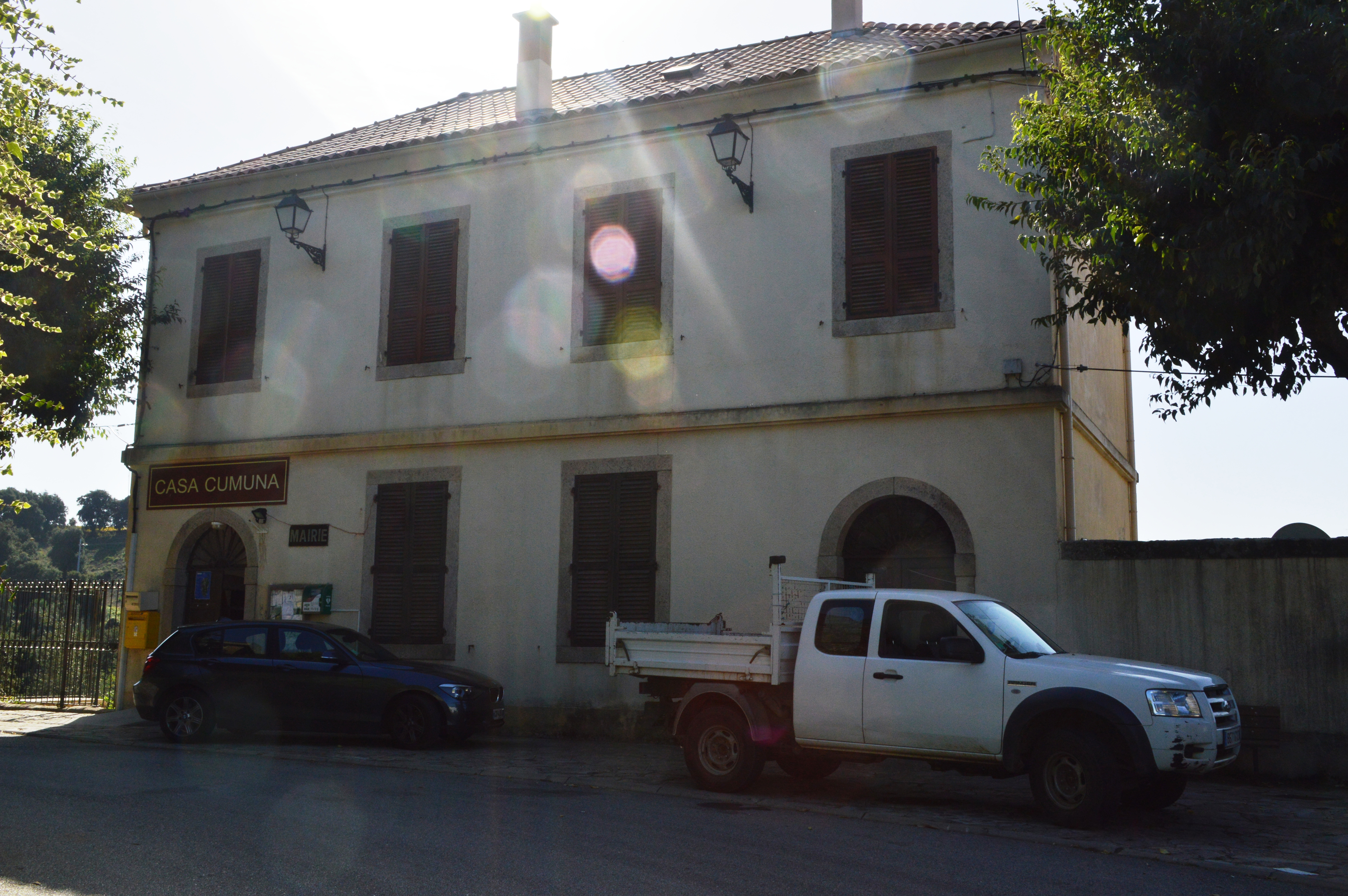
The Town Hall

List of Successive Mayors

From	To	Name	Party
2001	2014	Étienne Colonna	UMP
2008	2026	Jean Toussaint Poli	

== Demography ==
Historical population

Year	Pop.	±% p.a.
1800	96	—
1821	120	+1.07%
1846	119	−0.03%
1872	138	+0.57%
1901	140	+0.05%
1926	98	−1.42%
1946	102	+0.20%
1962	89	−0.85%
1968	89	+0.00%

Year	Pop.	±% p.a.
1975	79	−1.69%
1982	59	−4.08%
1990	48	−2.55%
1999	43	−1.21%
2007	59	+4.03%
2012	66	+2.27%
2017	68	+0.60%
2023	79	+2.53%

Source: EHESS and INSEE

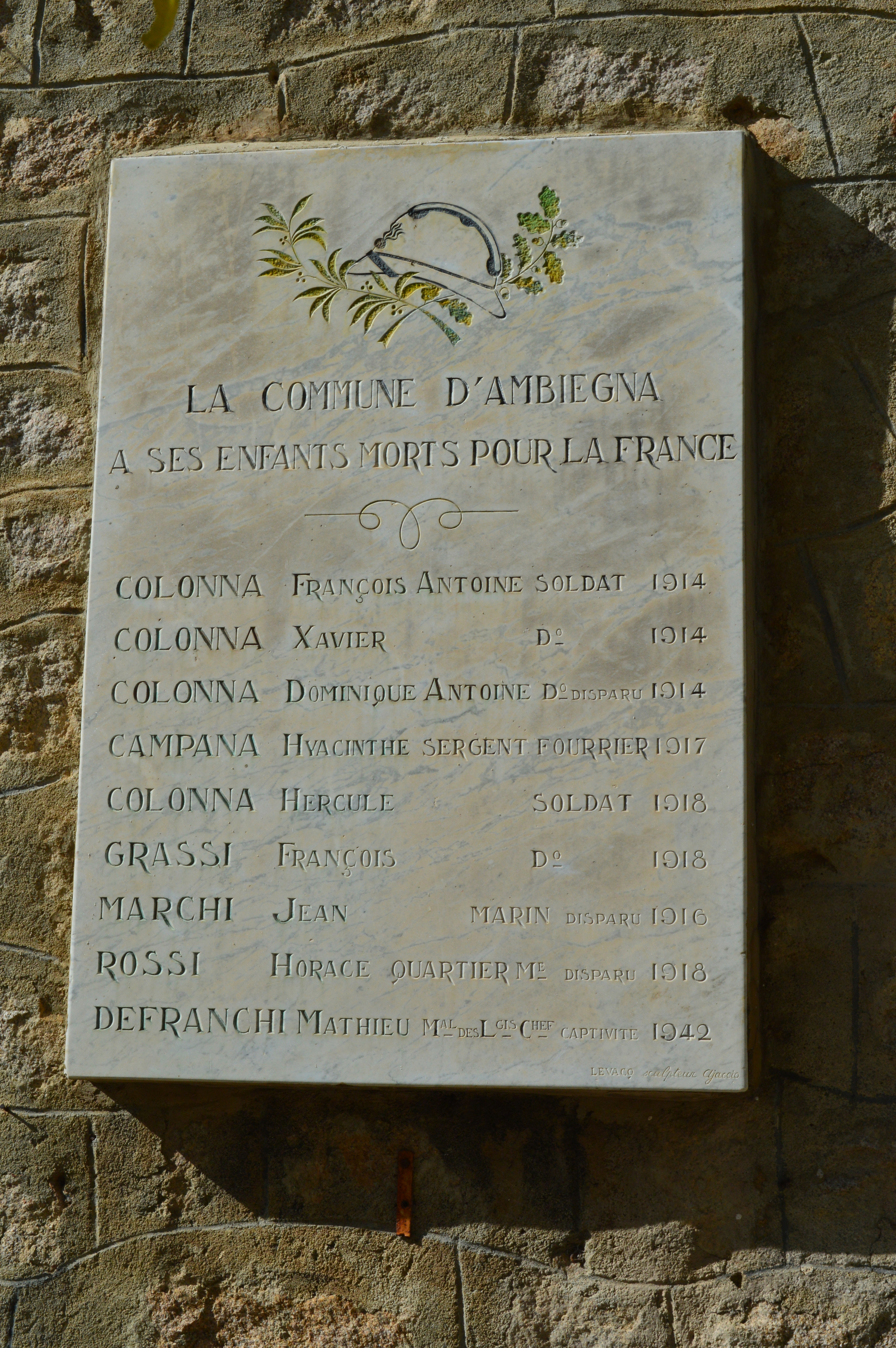
A Memorial Plaque in Ambiegna

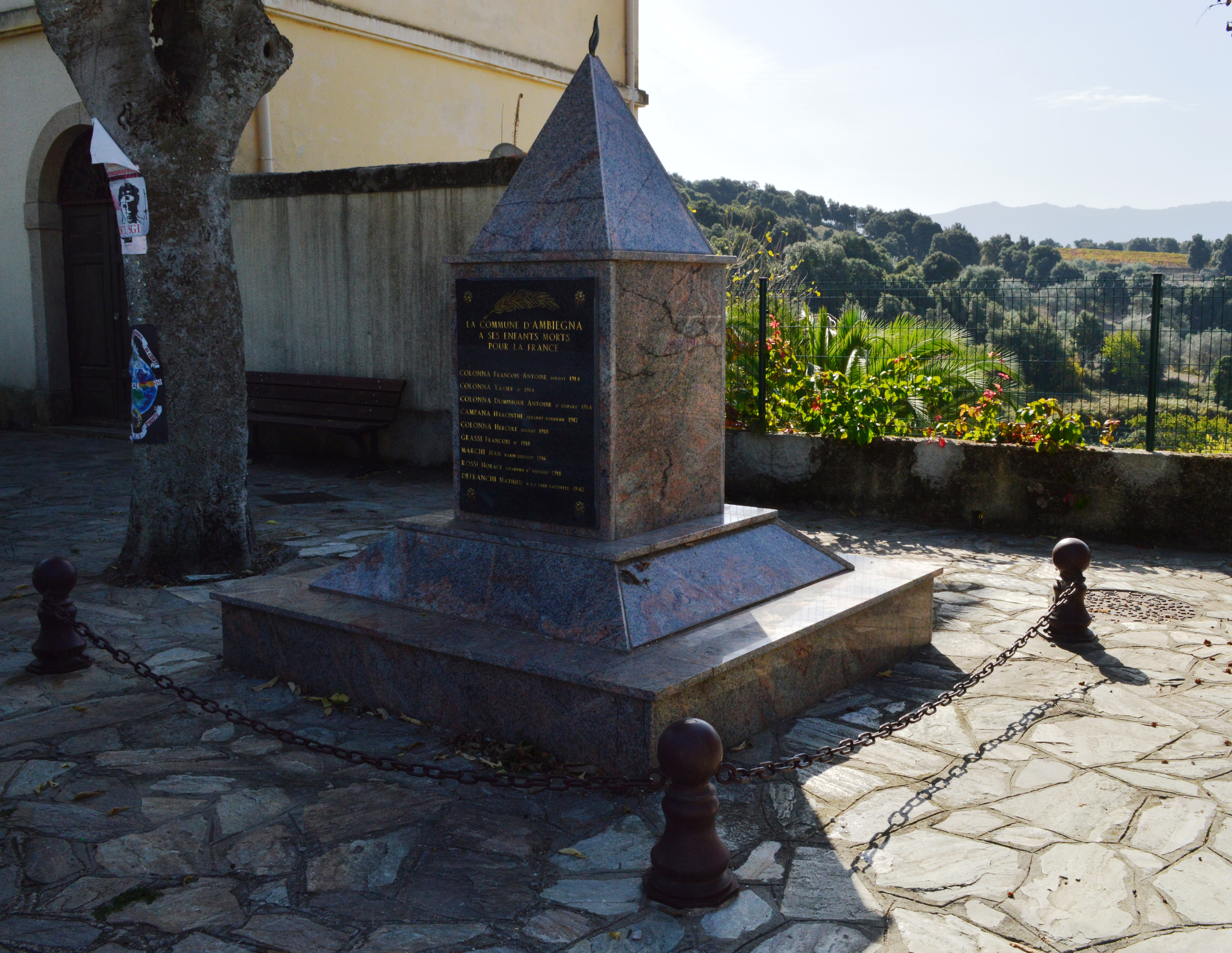
Ambiegna War Memorial

== Culture and heritage ==
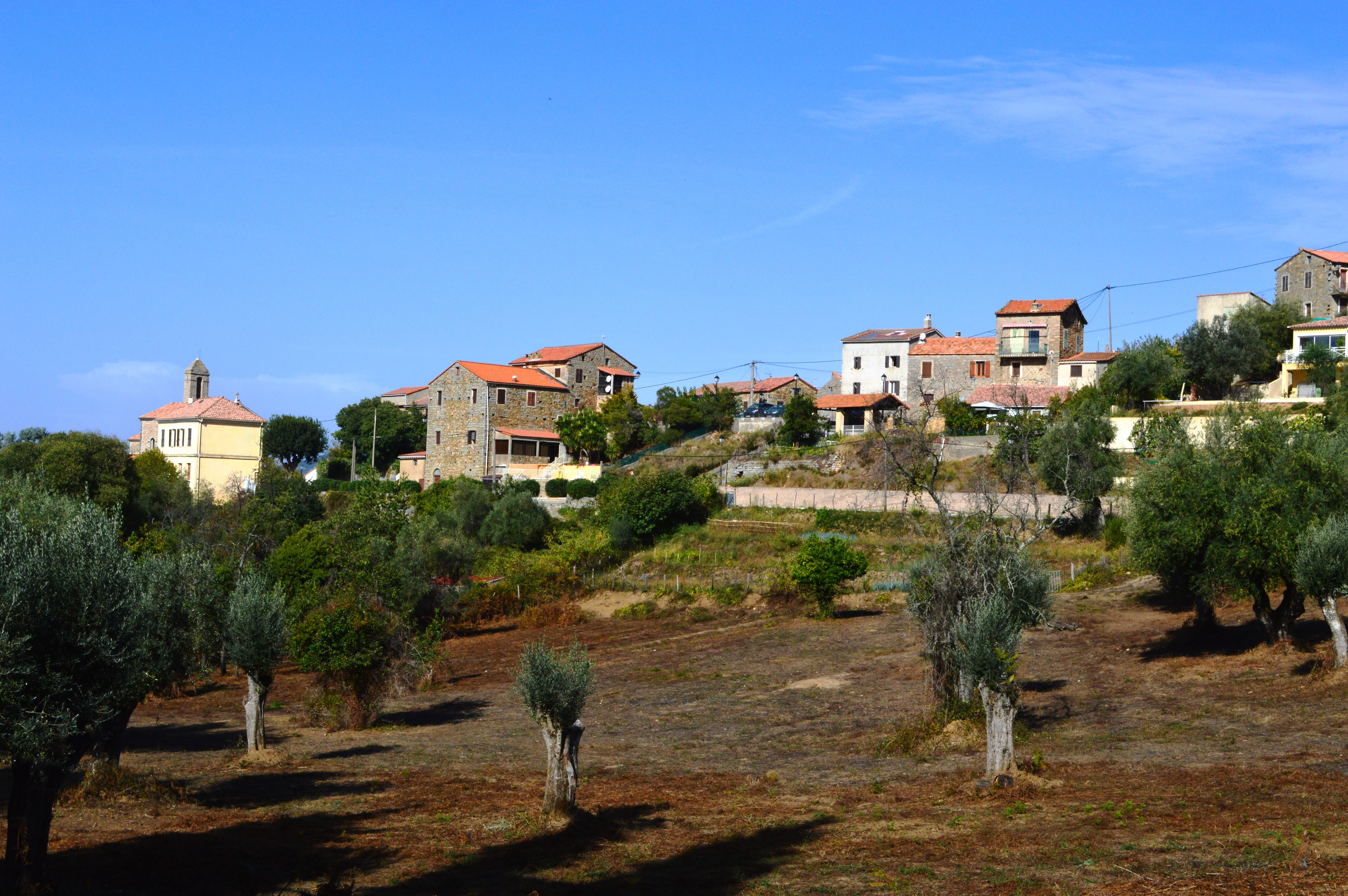
Ambiegna Village

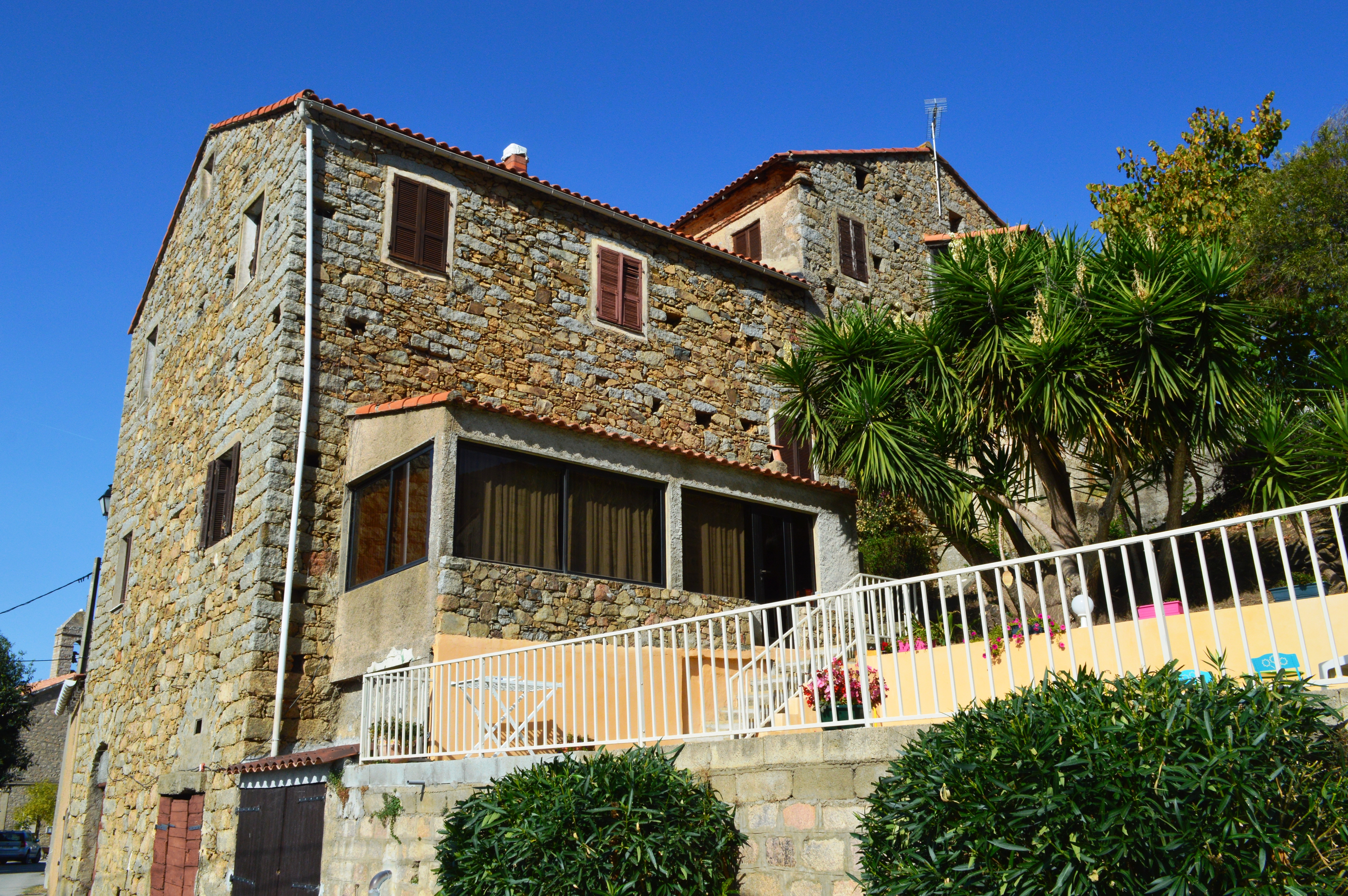
The Marchi Family House 2

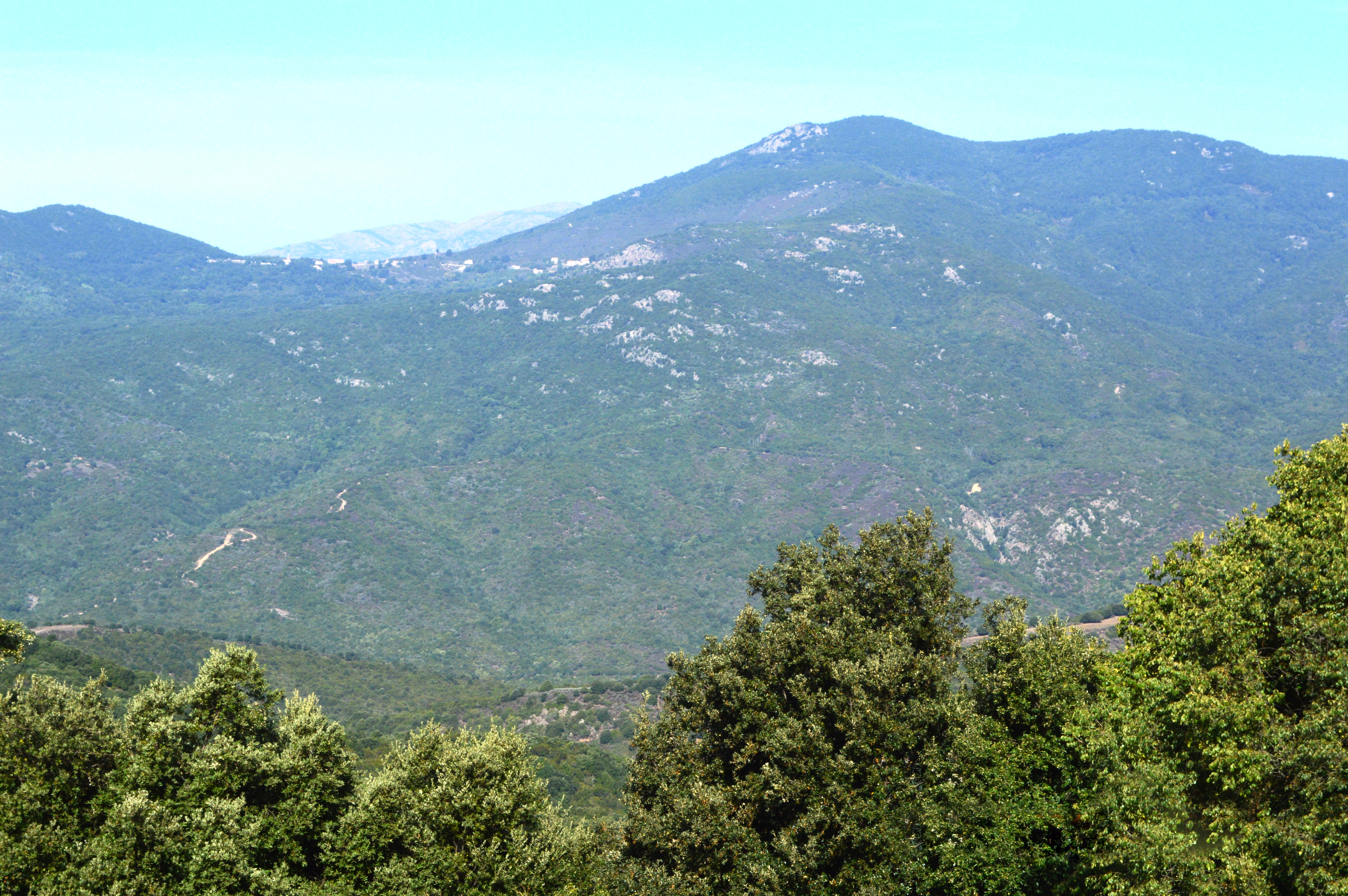
View from Ambiegna

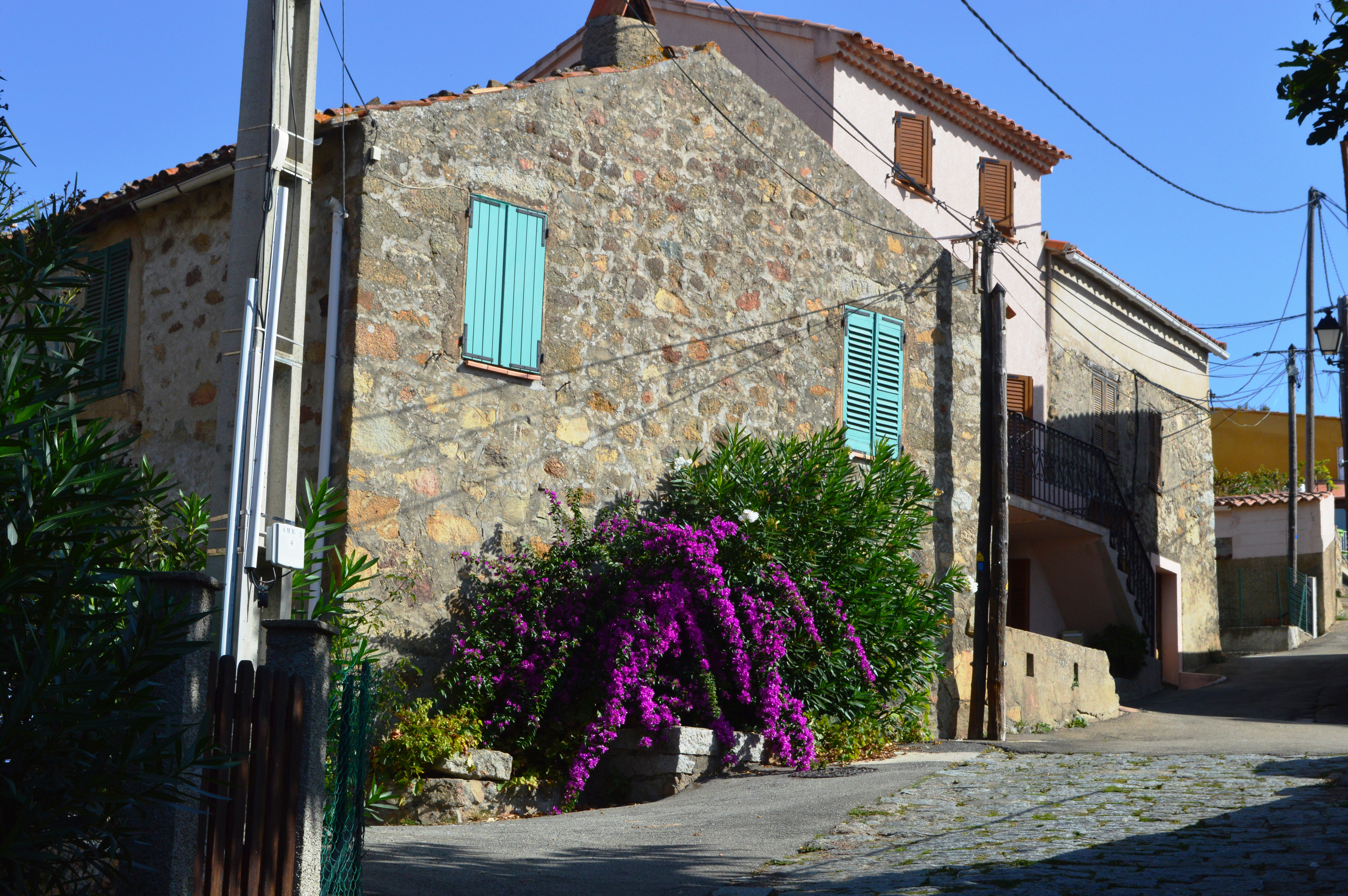
House 7

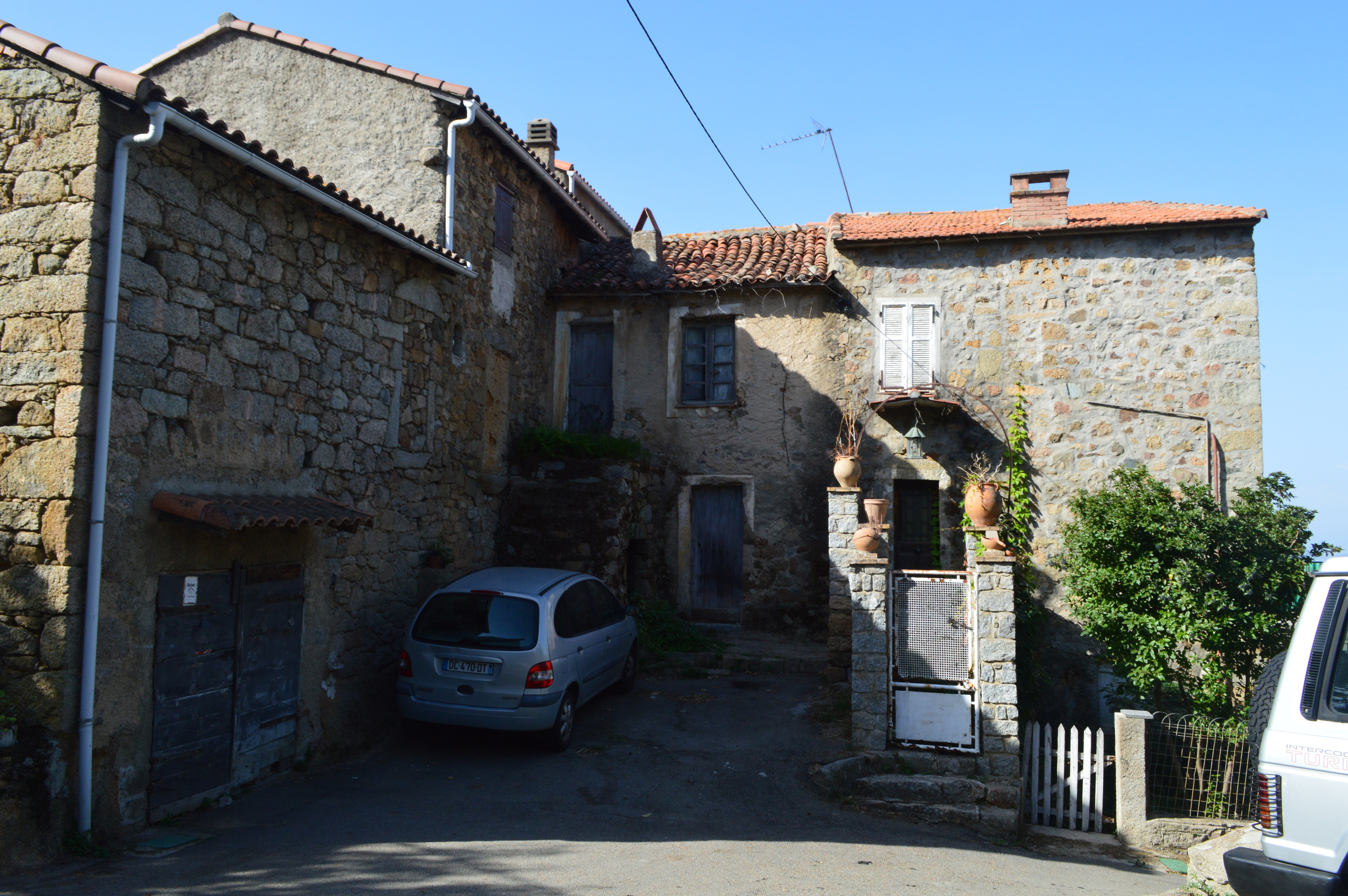
A house in Ambiegna

=== Civil heritage ===
The commune has a number of buildings and structures that are registered as historical monuments:

- A Rotary Oil Mill (20th century)
- The Marchi family House (1) (1733)
- The Marchi family House (2) (1861)
- The Defranchi family House (1866)
- A House (6) (1855)
- A House (7) (18th century)
- A Fabrica di Pipa Sawmill (1893)
- A Flour Mill (18th century)
- A former Presbytery (1871)
- A former School now the Town Hall (1886)
- Houses (18th-19th century)

=== Religious heritage ===
The Parish Church of Saint-Côme and Saint-Damien (19th century) is registered as an historical monument. The Church contains many items that are registered as historical objects:

- A Painting: Virgin and child with Saints (17th century)
- A Ciborium (20th century)
- A Statuette for Collections (20th century)
- A Sunburst Monstrance (19th century)
- A Chalice with Paten (19th century)
- A Chalice (18th century)
- A set of 2 Altar Candlesticks (17th century)
- A Pail for Holy water (19th century)
- An Altar Painting: Virgin and child surrounded by Saints (17th century)
- A Statuette: the Child Jesus (19th century)
- A Painting: Saint Antoine of Padua and the child Jesus (18th century)
- A Statue: Saint Antoine of Padua and the child Jesus (19th century)
- A Baptismal font (18th century)
- The Furniture in the Church

== See also ==
- Communes of the Corse-du-Sud department
