= Tourism in France =

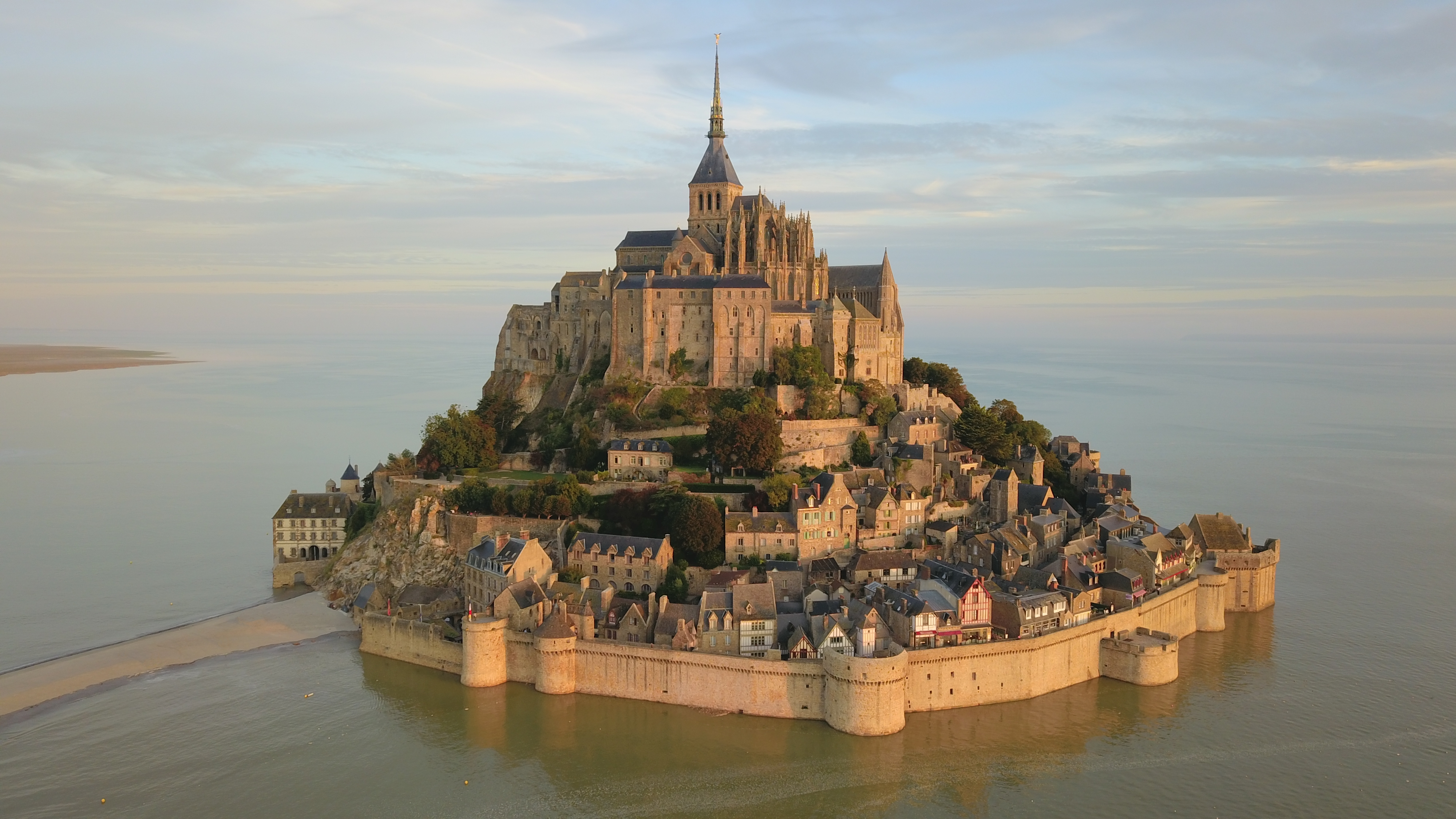
Mont Saint-Michel, Manche

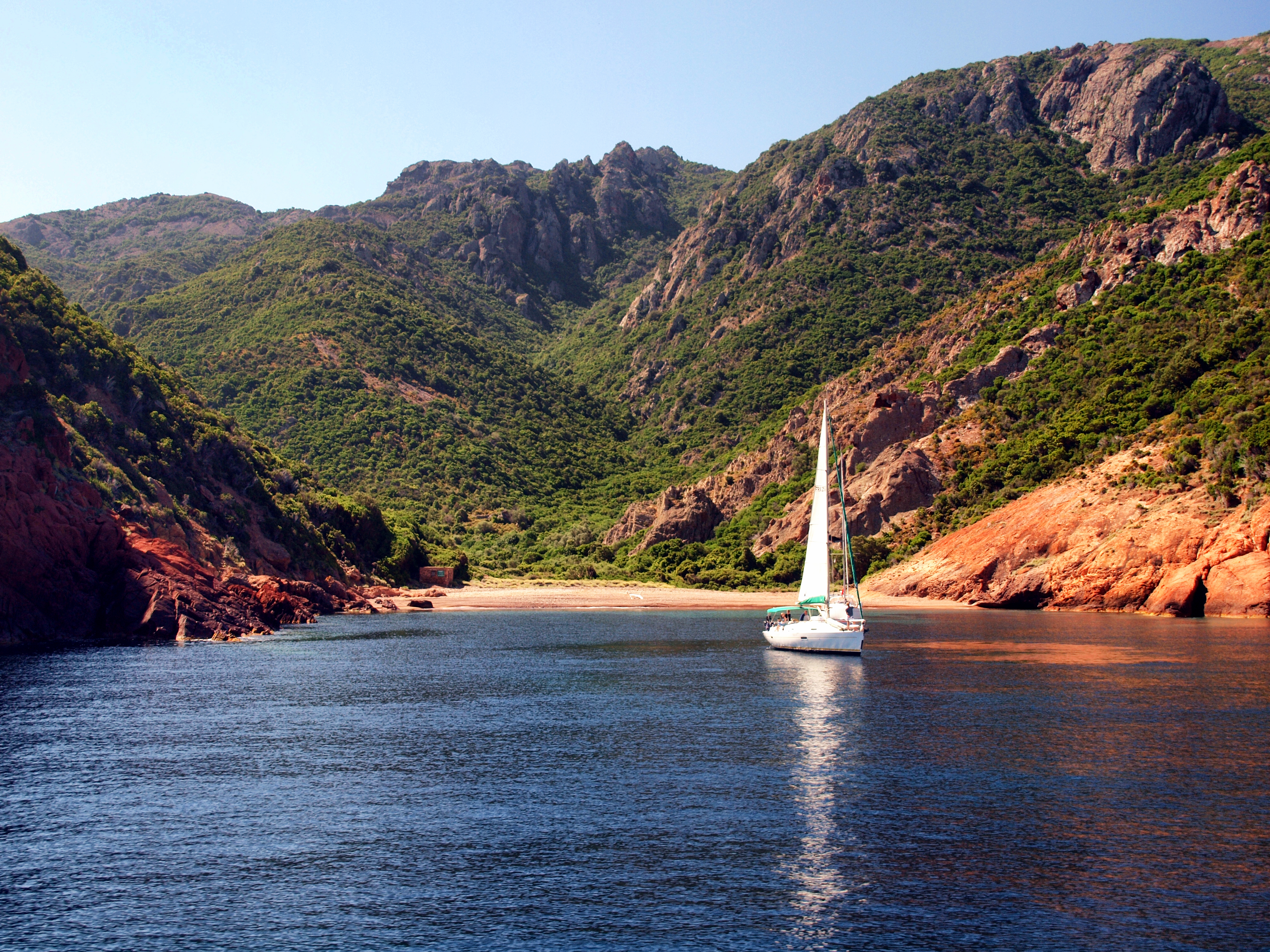
Scandola Nature Reserve, Corsica

Tourism in France is a significant contributor to the country's gross domestic product (GDP). In 2023, France ranked as the world's sixth-largest travel and tourism market, with the sector contributing US$264.7 billion to GDP. International tourism receipts reached €77.5 billion in 2025, an increase of 9% over 2024. In 2013, the sector's total contribution accounted for 9.7% of GDP and supported 2.9 million jobs, representing 10.9% of employment.

France was visited by 58.8 million foreign tourists in 2025, making it the fourth most visited country in the world. and the sixth in terms of hotel stays, with 151 million nights, behind the United States, Spain, Italy, China and Turkey.

France has 53 sites inscribed in the UNESCO's World Heritage List and features cities or sites of high cultural interest (Paris being the foremost, but also Loire Valley, Toulouse, Strasbourg, Bordeaux, Lyon and others), beaches and seaside resorts, ski resorts, as well as rural regions that many enjoy for their beauty and tranquility (green tourism). Small and picturesque French villages of quality heritage (such as Collonges-la-Rouge, Locronan, or Montsoreau) are promoted through the association Les Plus Beaux Villages de France (literally "The Most Beautiful Villages of France"). The "Remarkable Gardens" label is a list of the over two hundred gardens classified by the Ministry of Culture. This label is intended to protect and promote remarkable gardens and parks.

== Statistics ==
Yearly tourist arrivals in millions

Most tourists arriving to France in 2018 came from the following countries or territories:

Rank	Country or territory	Number of tourists
1	United Kingdom	13,000,000
2	Germany	12,300,000
3	Belgium Luxembourg	11,600,000
4	Italy	7,000,000
5	Switzerland	6,800,000
6	Spain	6,700,000
7	Netherlands	4,700,000
8	United States	4,500,000
Total		89,300,000

=== Number of stays ===
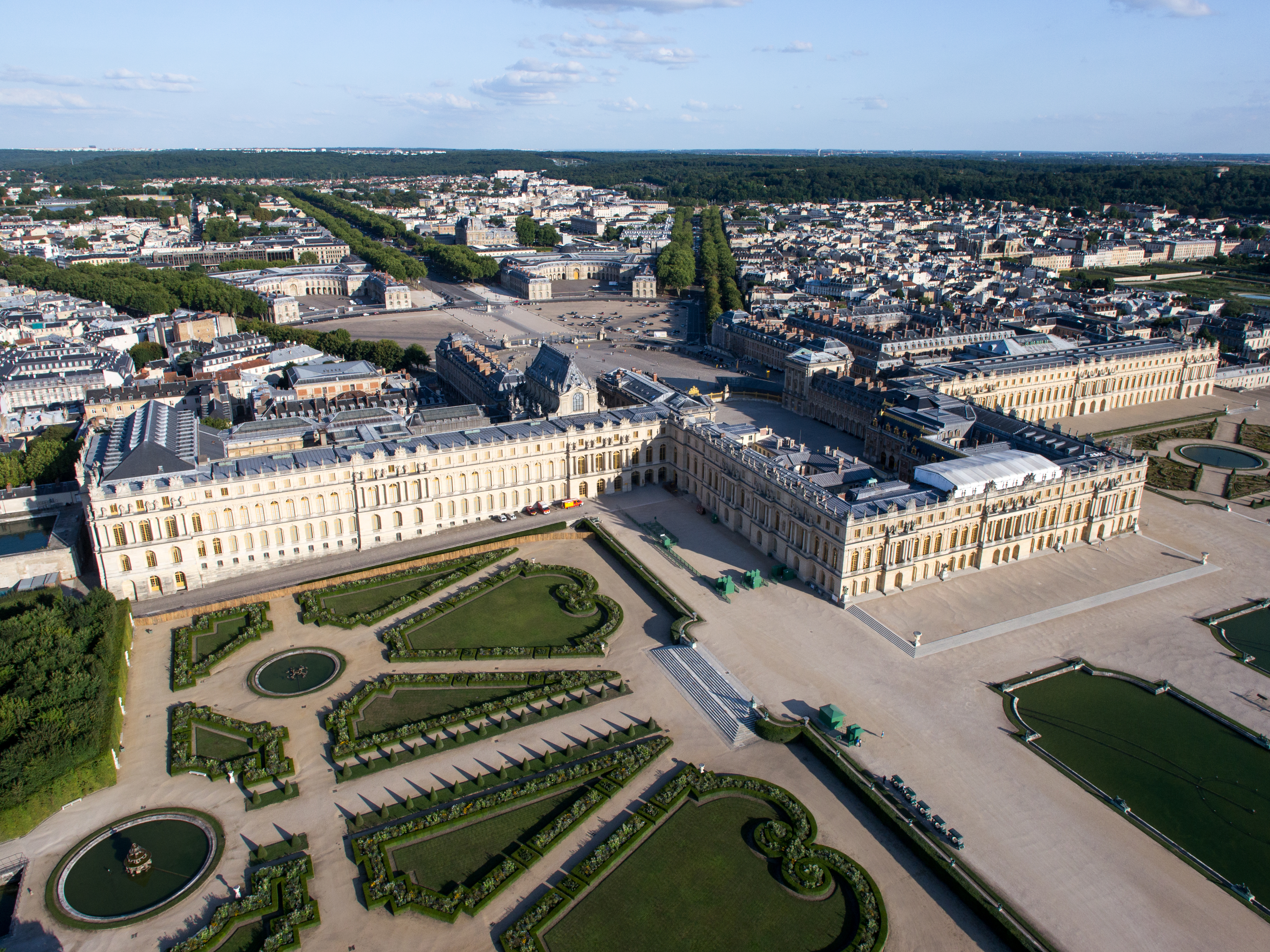
Palace of Versailles, Yvelines

Rank	Country	Stays
1	Germany	18,300,000
2	United Kingdom	17,200,000
3	Netherlands	16,800,000
4	Belgium	10,400,000
5	United States	8,800,000
6	Spain	6,900,000
7	Italy	6,100,000
8	Switzerland	5,900,000
9	Oceania	910,000
10	Canada	1,400,000
11	China	1,100,000
12	Scandinavia	2,400,000
13	Asia	2,200,000
14	Africa	1,500,000
15	Japan	800,000
	Other countries	27,700,000
Total		146,800,000

=== Most visited cities by tourist arrivals and overnight stays ===
Data for 2022–2023.

Rank	City	Region	Arrivals	Overnight stays
1	Paris	Île-de-France	36,900,000	68,700,000
2	Nice	Provence-Alpes-Côte d'Azur	5,900,000	12,000,000
3	Marseille	Provence-Alpes-Côte d'Azur	4,300,000	8,000,000
4	Lyon	Auvergne-Rhône-Alpes	3,200,000	6,000,000
5	Toulouse	Occitanie	2,800,000	5,400,000
6	Bordeaux	Nouvelle-Aquitaine	2,600,000	4,900,000
7	Strasbourg	Grand Est	2,400,000	4,500,000
8	Montpellier	Occitanie	1,800,000	3,200,000
9	Nantes	Pays de la Loire	1,700,000	3,000,000
10	Annecy	Auvergne-Rhône-Alpes	1,500,000	3,000,000
11	Rennes	Brittany	1,300,000	2,400,000
12	Reims	Grand Est	1,200,000	2,100,000
13	Avignon	Provence-Alpes-Côte d'Azur	1,100,000	2,000,000
14	Dijon	Bourgogne-Franche-Comté	1,000,000	1,900,000
15	Arles	Provence-Alpes-Côte d'Azur	900,000	1,800,000
16	Lille	Hauts-de-France	900,000	1,700,000
17	Aix-en-Provence	Provence-Alpes-Côte d'Azur	900,000	1,700,000
18	Cannes	Provence-Alpes-Côte d'Azur	900,000	1,700,000
19	Saint-Étienne	Auvergne-Rhône-Alpes	850,000	1,700,000
20	Grenoble	Auvergne-Rhône-Alpes	800,000	1,600,000
21	La Rochelle	Nouvelle-Aquitaine	800,000	1,600,000
22	Clermont-Ferrand	Auvergne-Rhône-Alpes	750,000	1,500,000
23	Tours	Centre-Val de Loire	750,000	1,400,000
24	Orléans	Centre-Val de Loire	700,000	1,300,000
25	Rouen	Normandy	700,000	1,500,000
26	Caen	Normandy	650,000	1,300,000
27	Le Havre	Normandy	650,000	1,300,000
28	Colmar	Grand Est	625,000	1,230,000
29	Metz	Grand Est	600,000	1,200,000
30	Nancy	Grand Est	600,000	1,200,000

=== Tourist arrivals and overnight stays by region ===
Tourist arrivals and overnight stays in accommodation establishments in metropolitan France, 2025
Rank	Region	Non-resident arrivals	Total overnight stays (millions)	Non-resident overnight stays (millions)	Non-resident share
1	Île-de-France	20,255,742	90.373	48.959	54.17%
2	Provence-Alpes-Côte d'Azur	6,397,173	57.292	19.217	33.54%
3	Auvergne-Rhône-Alpes	6,583,587	62.026	17.902	28.86%
4	Occitania	4,158,251	56.988	13.554	23.78%
5	Nouvelle-Aquitaine	4,056,847	58.309	12.983	22.27%
6	Grand Est	5,028,390	23.239	9.372	40.33%
7	Brittany	1,693,806	26.604	5.278	19.84%
8	Normandy	2,145,985	17.310	4.849	28.01%
9	Hauts-de-France	2,282,830	16.185	4.523	27.94%
10	Bourgogne-Franche-Comté	2,413,635	11.620	3.874	33.33%
11	Corsica	1,145,456	11.035	3.708	33.61%
12	Pays de la Loire	1,095,640	25.686	3.586	13.96%
13	Centre-Val de Loire	1,318,756	10.511	2.396	22.80%
Metropolitan France		58,576,098	467.179	150.203	32.15%

Note: Arrivals refer to tourist registrations at accommodation establishments rather than the number of unique visitors. Overnight stays represent the number of nights spent at these establishments. The data are published directly by Eurostat and cover hotels, short-stay accommodation and camping grounds (NACE I551–I553). Overnight stays are expressed in millions and rounded to three decimal places; percentages are calculated from unrounded figures. Totals represent the sum of the 13 regions of metropolitan France, excluding overseas territories.

=== Most visited tourist sites in France ===
The following ranking lists the 30 most visited cultural sites in France in 2023. Notre-Dame de Paris is not included.

Rank	Site	Location	Visitors
1	Disneyland Paris	Marne-la-Vallée	15,000,000
2	Sacré-Cœur Basilica	Paris	13,500,000
3	Louvre	Paris	8,900,000
4	Palace of Versailles	Versailles	8,100,000
5	Eiffel Tower	Paris	6,300,000
6	Vieux Lyon	Lyon	6,000,000
7	Sanctuary of Our Lady of Lourdes	Lourdes	4,700,000
8	Muséum national d'histoire naturelle	Paris	3,500,000
9	Honfleur (harbour)	Honfleur	3,500,000
10	Musée d'Orsay	Paris	3,000,000
11	Strasbourg Cathedral	Strasbourg	3,000,000
12	Rouen (historic centre)	Rouen	3,000,000
13	Parc Astérix	Plailly	2,800,000
14	Centre Pompidou	Paris	2,600,000
15	Puy du Fou	Les Epesses	2,500,000
16	Basilica of Notre-Dame de Fourvière	Lyon	2,500,000
17	Cité des Sciences et de l'Industrie	Paris	2,300,000
18	ZooParc de Beauval	Beauval	2,000,000
19	Futuroscope	Poitiers	2,000,000
20	Saint-Malo (ramparts)	Saint-Malo	2,000,000
21	Arc de Triomphe	Paris	2,000,000
22	Mont-Saint-Michel	Normandy	1,500,000
23	Étretat (cliffs)	Étretat	1,500,000
24	Château de Chambord	Chambord	1,500,000
25	Fondation Louis Vuitton	Paris	1,500,000
26	Reims Cathedral	Reims	1,500,000
27	Sainte-Chapelle	Paris	1,400,000
28	Musée du quai Branly – Jacques Chirac	Paris	1,300,000
29	Museum of European and Mediterranean Civilisations	Marseille	1,300,000
30	Chartres Cathedral	Chartres	1,300,000

== Touristic regions ==
=== Paris ===
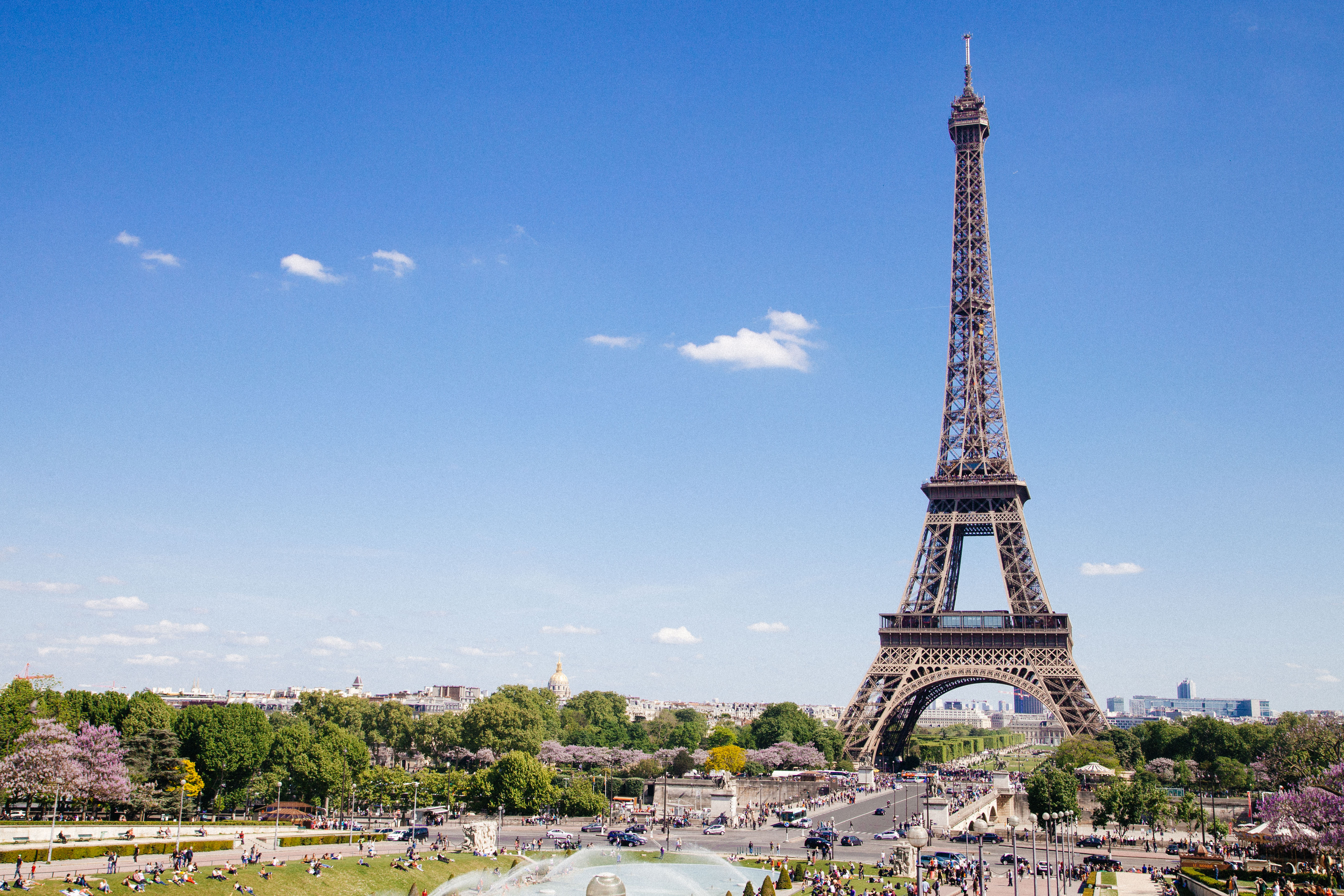
The Eiffel Tower seen from the Place du Trocadéro

Paris, the capital city of France, is the third most visited city in the world.

It has some of the world's largest and renowned museums, including the Louvre, which is the most visited art museum in the world, but also the Musée d'Orsay which, like the nearby Musée de l'Orangerie, is mostly devoted to impressionism, and Centre Georges Pompidou, dedicated to Contemporary art.

Paris hosts some of the world's most recognizable landmarks such as the Eiffel Tower, which is the most-visited paid monument in the world, the Arc de Triomphe, the cathedral of Notre-Dame, or the Sacré-Cœur on Montmartre. The Cité des Sciences et de l'Industrie, located in Parc de la Villette, is the biggest science museum in Europe. Near Paris are located the Palace of Versailles, the former palace of the Kings of France, now a museum, and the medieval village of Provins. Both attractions are protected as UNESCO World Heritage Sites.

=== French Riviera ===
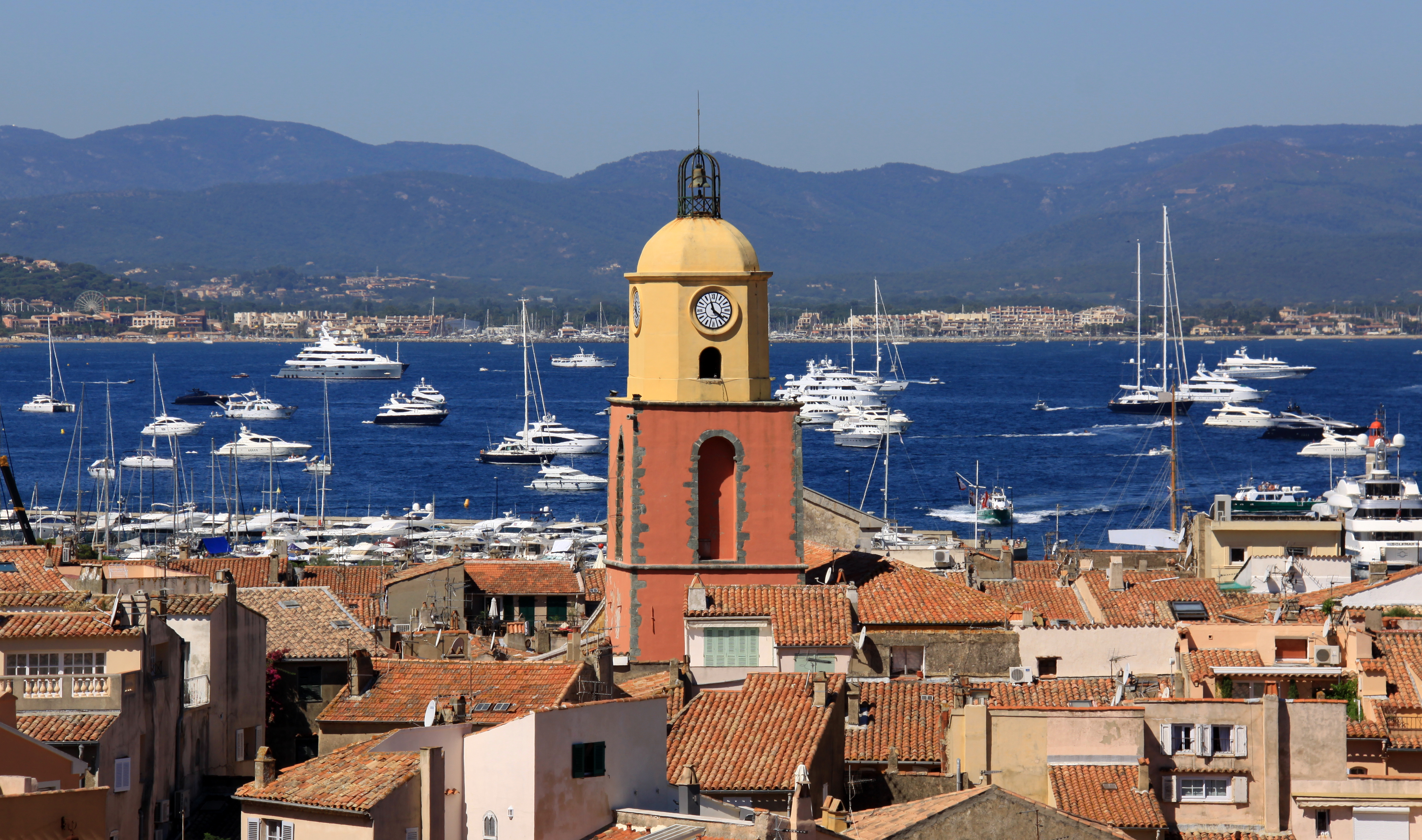
Saint-Tropez on the Côte d'Azur

With more than 10 million tourists a year, the French Riviera (French: Côte d'Azur), in Southeastern France, is the second leading tourist destination in the country, after the Parisian region.

According to the Côte d'Azur Economic Development Agency, it benefits from 300 days of sunshine per year, 115 kilometres (71 mi) of coastline and beaches, 18 golf courses and 3,000 restaurants. Each year the Côte d'Azur hosts 50% of the world's superyacht fleet, with 90% of all superyachts visiting the region's coast at least once in their lifetime.

Main cities on the French Riviera include Nice, Antibes and Cannes; Cap Ferrat is also a popular destination. Cannes hosts the annual Cannes Film Festival. Tourists often visit Port-Cros National Park, east of Toulon, as well as the city-state of Monaco, famous for its Monte Carlo Casino, near the Italian border.

=== Provence ===
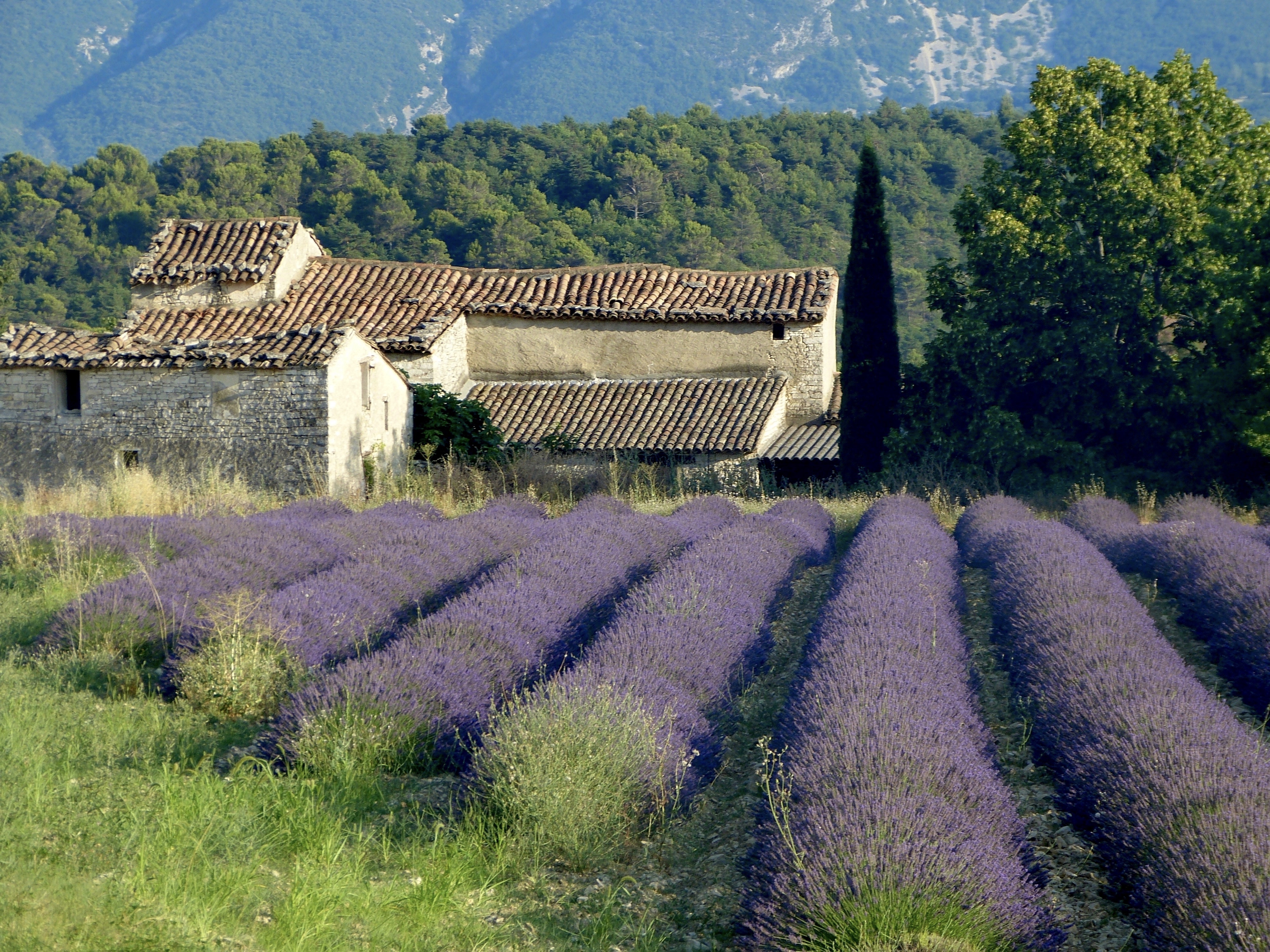
Paysage provençal

A large part of Provence, with Marseille as its leading city, was designed as the 2013 European Capital of Culture. Numerous famous natural sites can be found in the region, as the Gorges du Verdon, the Camargue, the Calanques National Park and the typical landscape of Luberon. Provence hosts dozens of renowned historical sites like the Pont du Gard, the Arles' Roman Monuments or the Palais des Papes in Avignon. Several smaller cities also attracts a lot of tourists, like Aix-en-Provence, La Ciotat or Cassis, on the Mediterranean Sea coastline.

=== Loire Valley ===
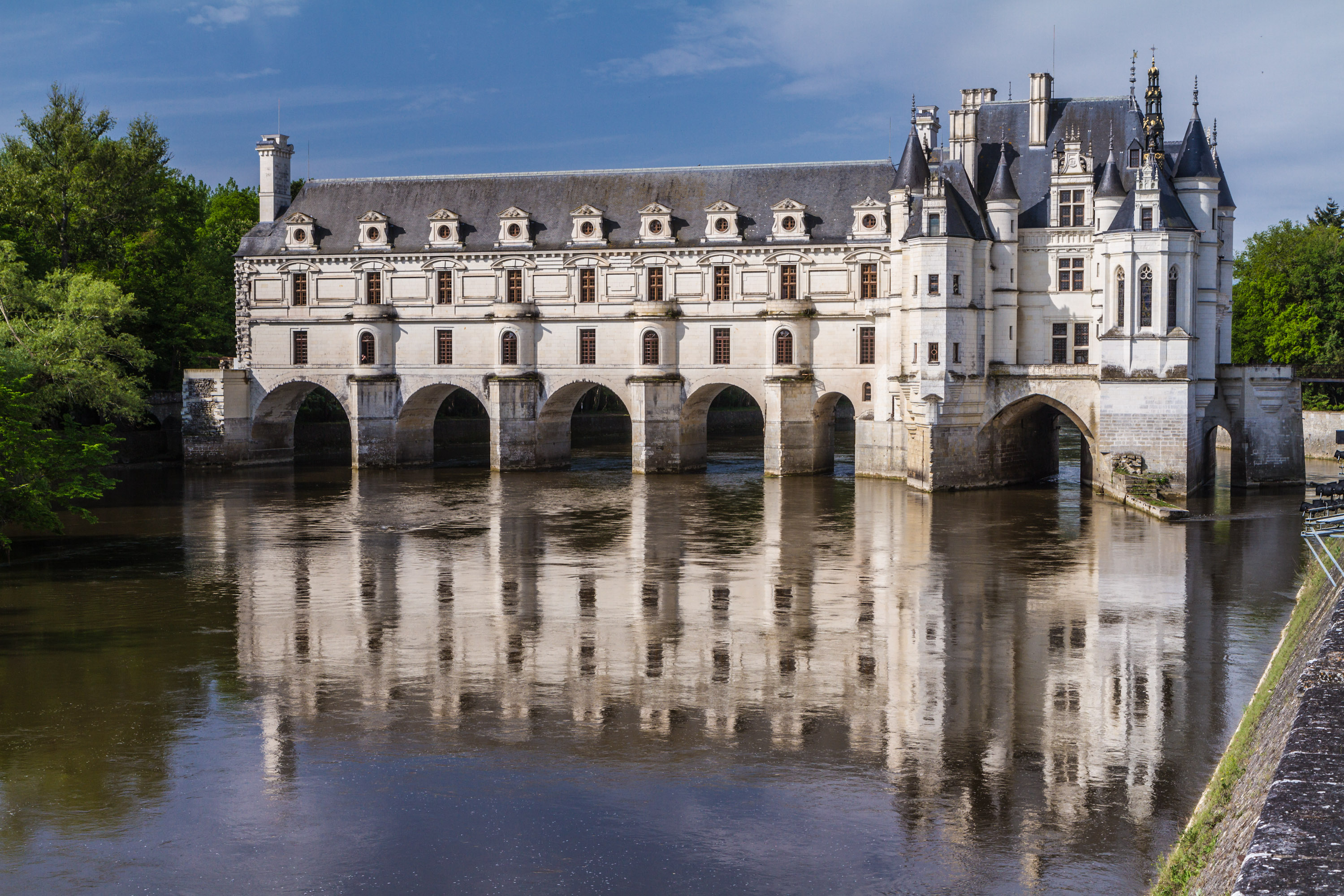
Château de Chenonceau, Loire Valley

Another major destination are the Châteaux (castles) of the Loire Valley. The French Revolution saw a number of the great French châteaux destroyed and many ransacked, their treasures stolen. The overnight impoverishment of many of the deposed nobility, usually after one of its members lost his or her head to the guillotine, saw many châteaux demolished.

During World War I and World War II, some chateaux were commandeered as military headquarters. Some of these continued to be used this way after the end of the Second World War.

This World Heritage Site is known for its architectural heritage, in its historic towns such as Amboise, Angers, Blois, Chinon, Orléans, and Saumur, and for its castles, such as the Châteaux d'Amboise, de Chambord, d'Ussé, de Villandry, de Chenonceau and de Montsoreau, which illustrate the ideals of the French Renaissance.

=== French Alps ===
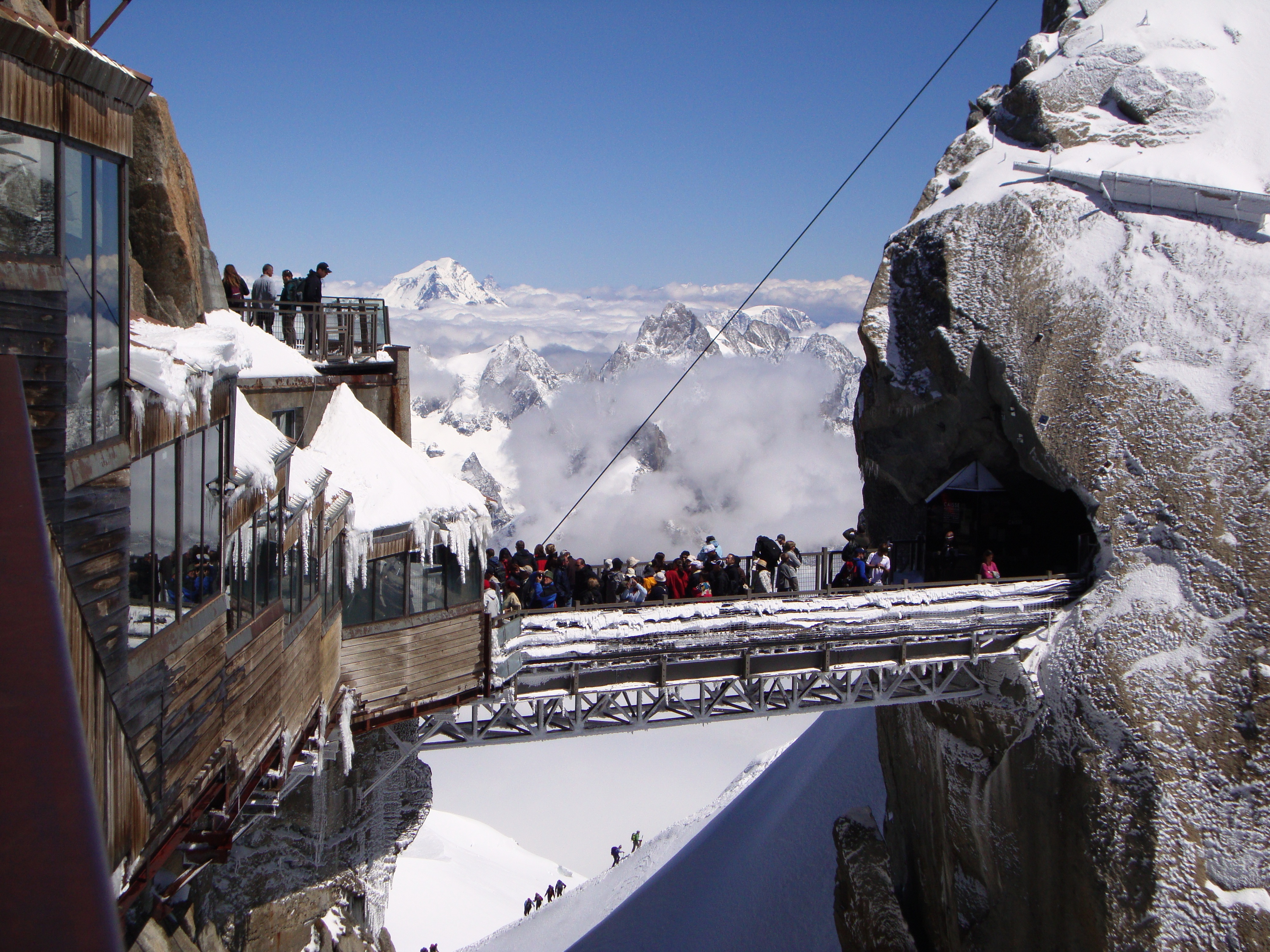
Aiguille du Midi

The French Alps are the portions of the Alps mountain range that stand within France, located in the Rhône-Alpes and Provence-Alpes-Côte d'Azur regions. While some of the ranges of the French Alps are entirely in France, others, such as the Mont Blanc massif, are shared with Switzerland and Italy.

More than 20 skiing resorts make it a popular destination among Europeans in the winter.

=== Corsica ===
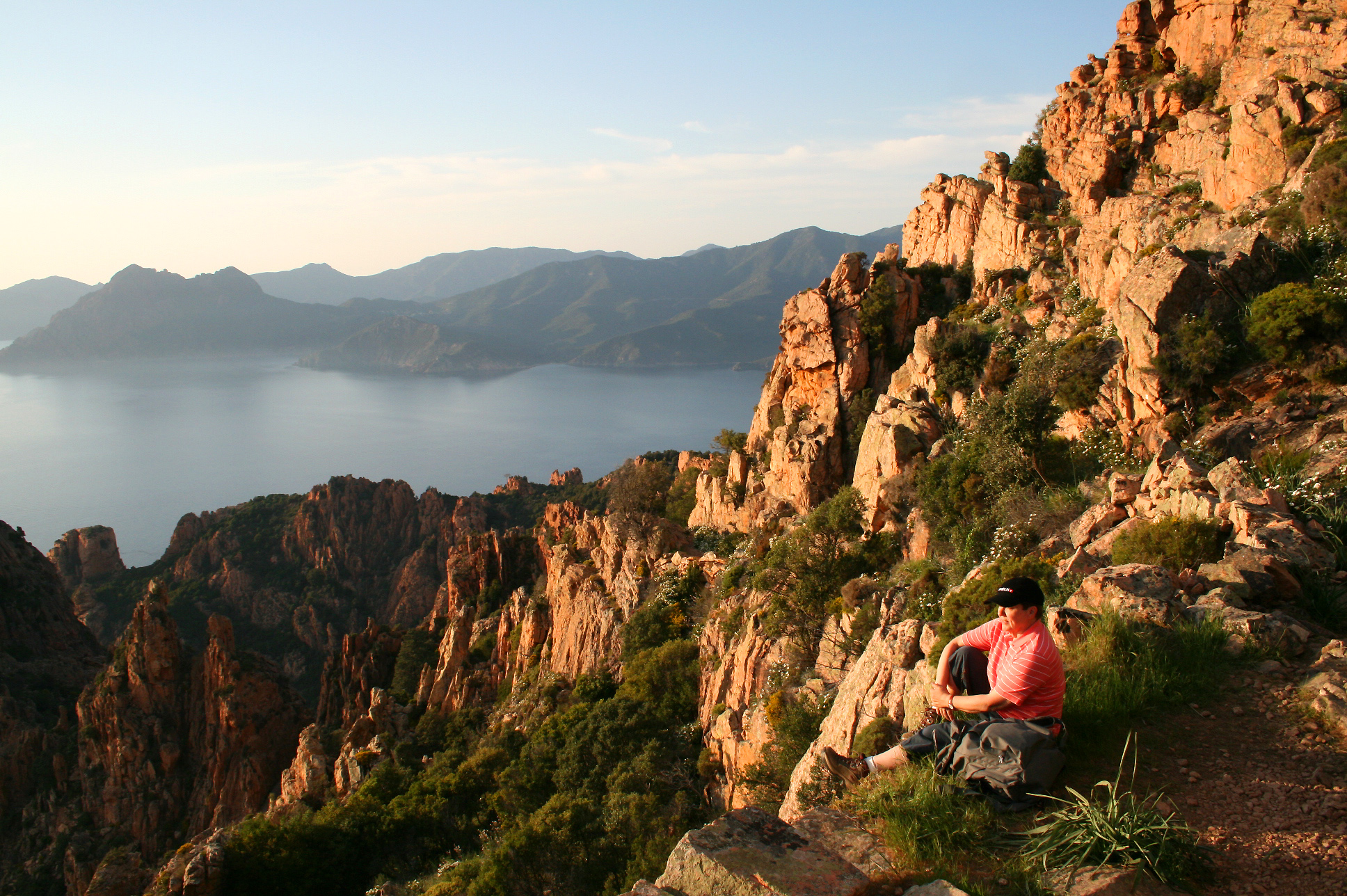
Corsican landscape

Corsica is the fourth largest island in the Mediterranean Sea after Sicily, Sardinia and Cyprus. It is a popular attraction for tourists with both cultural aspects (with its main cities Ajaccio and Bastia and smaller towns like Porto-Vecchio and Sartène) and geographical features (Parc naturel régional de Corse).

The Calanques de Piana and Scandola Nature Reserve are listed on the UNESCO World Heritage List. The island is 183 kilometres (114 miles) long at longest, 83 kilometres (52 miles) wide at widest, has 1,000 kilometres (620 miles) of coastline, more than 200 beaches, and is very mountainous, with Monte Cinto as the highest peak at 2,706 metres (8,878 feet) and around 120 other summits of more than 2,000 metres (6,600 feet).

Mountains comprise two-thirds of the island, forming a single chain. Forests make up 20% of the island.

==== Other tourist attractions ====
- Panthéon
- Sacré-Coeur
- Palais des Tuileries
- Cimetière du Père-Lachaise
- Palais du Luxembourg
- Centre Georges-Pompidou
- Place de la Concorde

== Notable places ==
=== Cities ===
France has many cities of cultural interest, some of them are classified as "Town of Art and History" by the French Ministry of Culture. All major cities in France are worth seeing since they all have cultural and historic attributes.

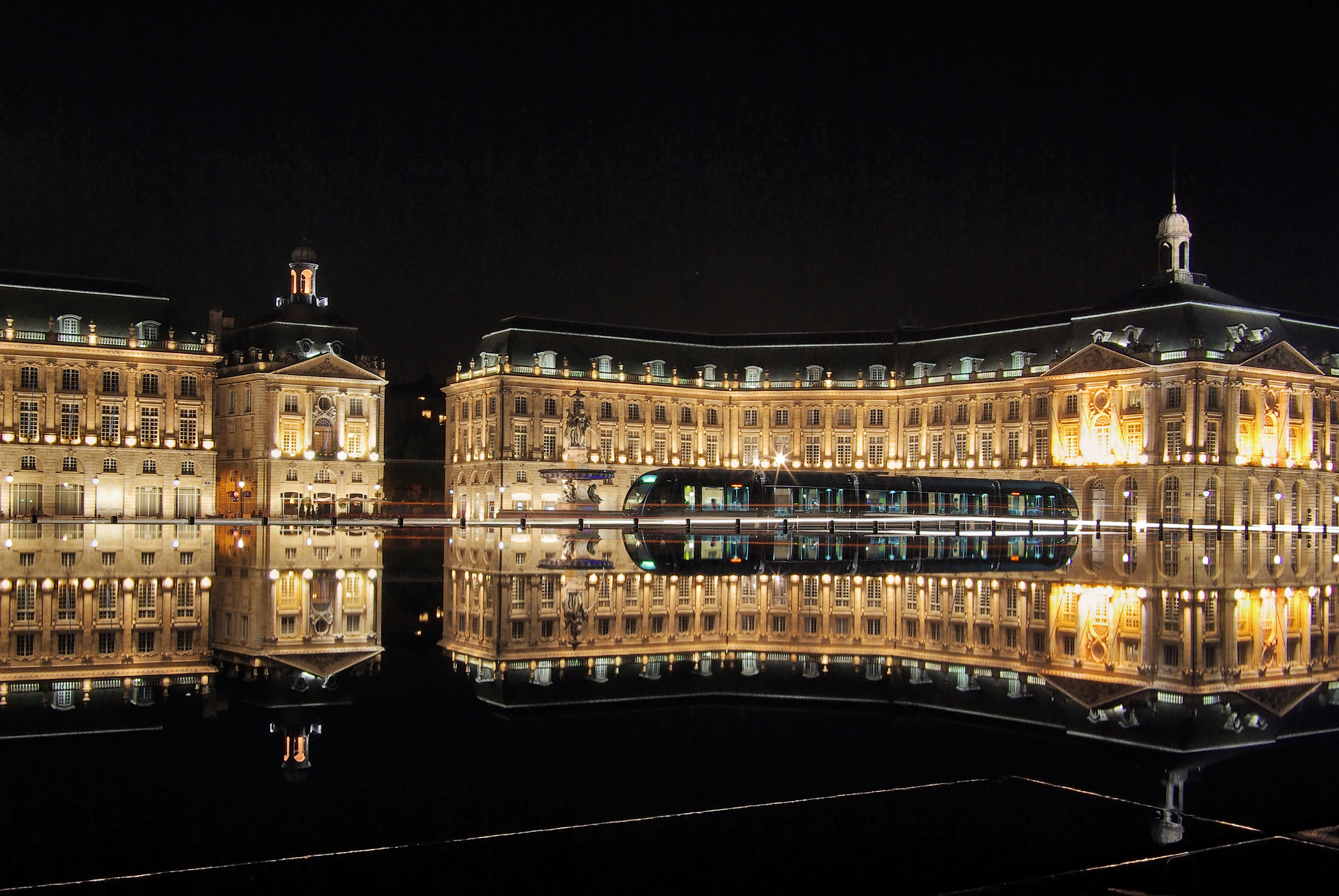
Bordeaux

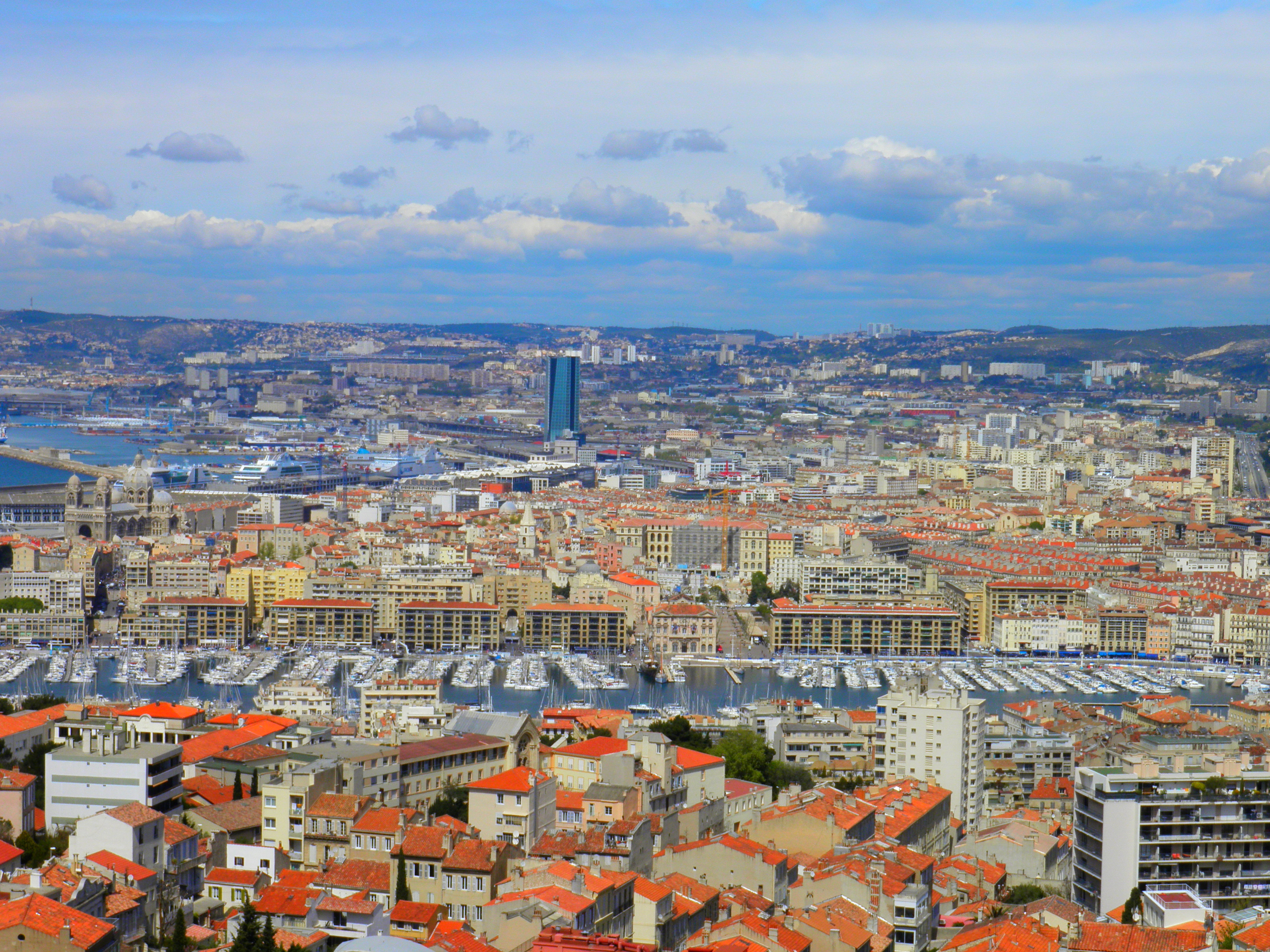
Marseille

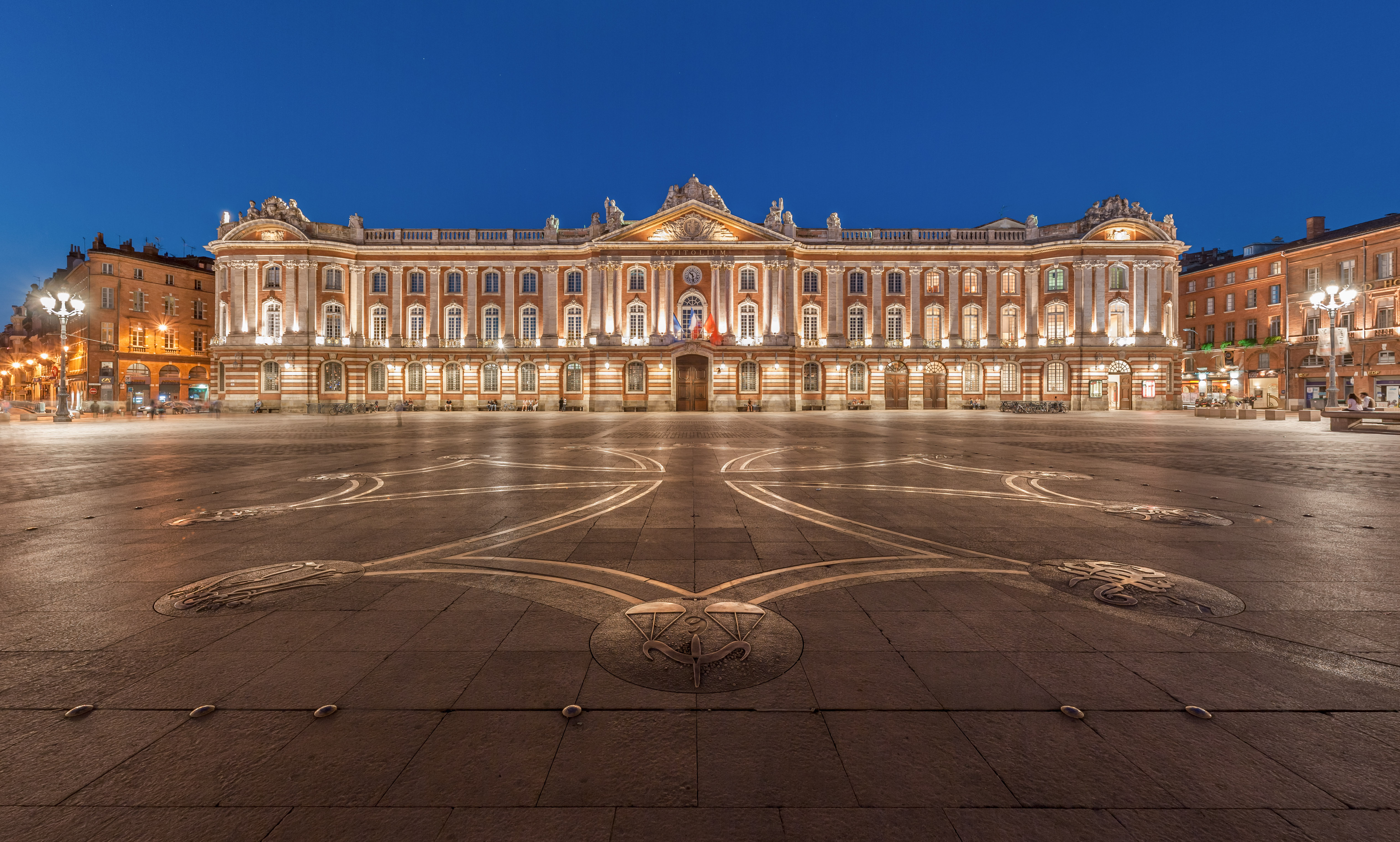
Toulouse

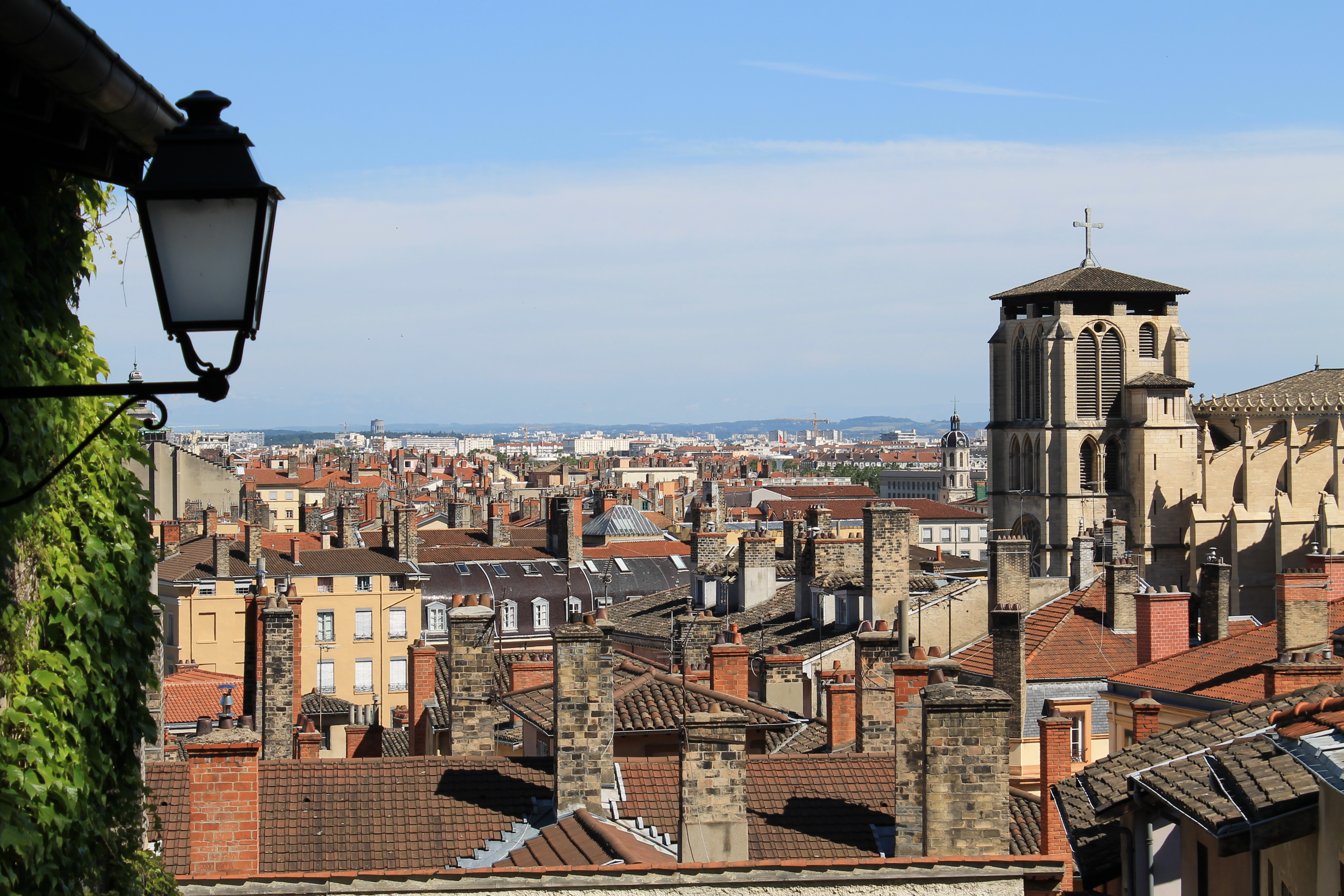
Lyon

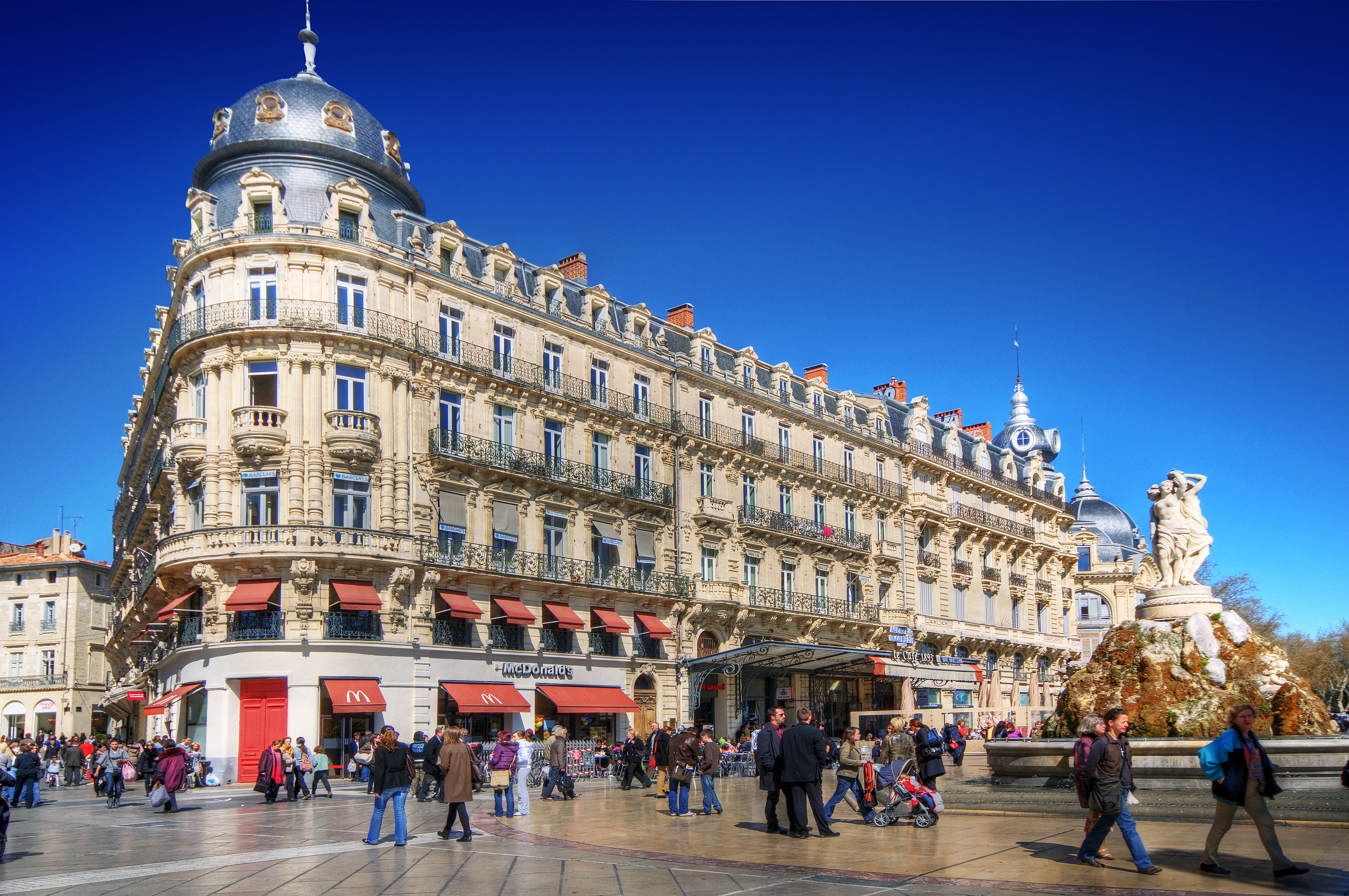
Montpellier

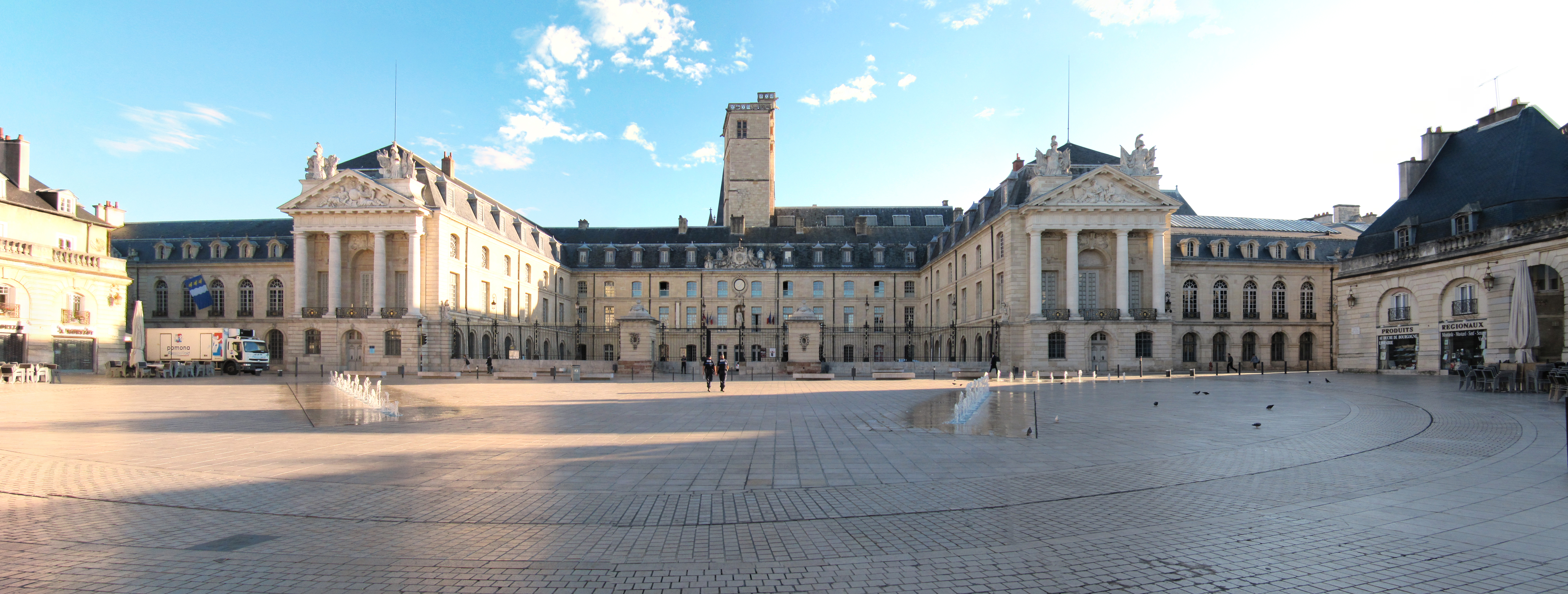
Dijon

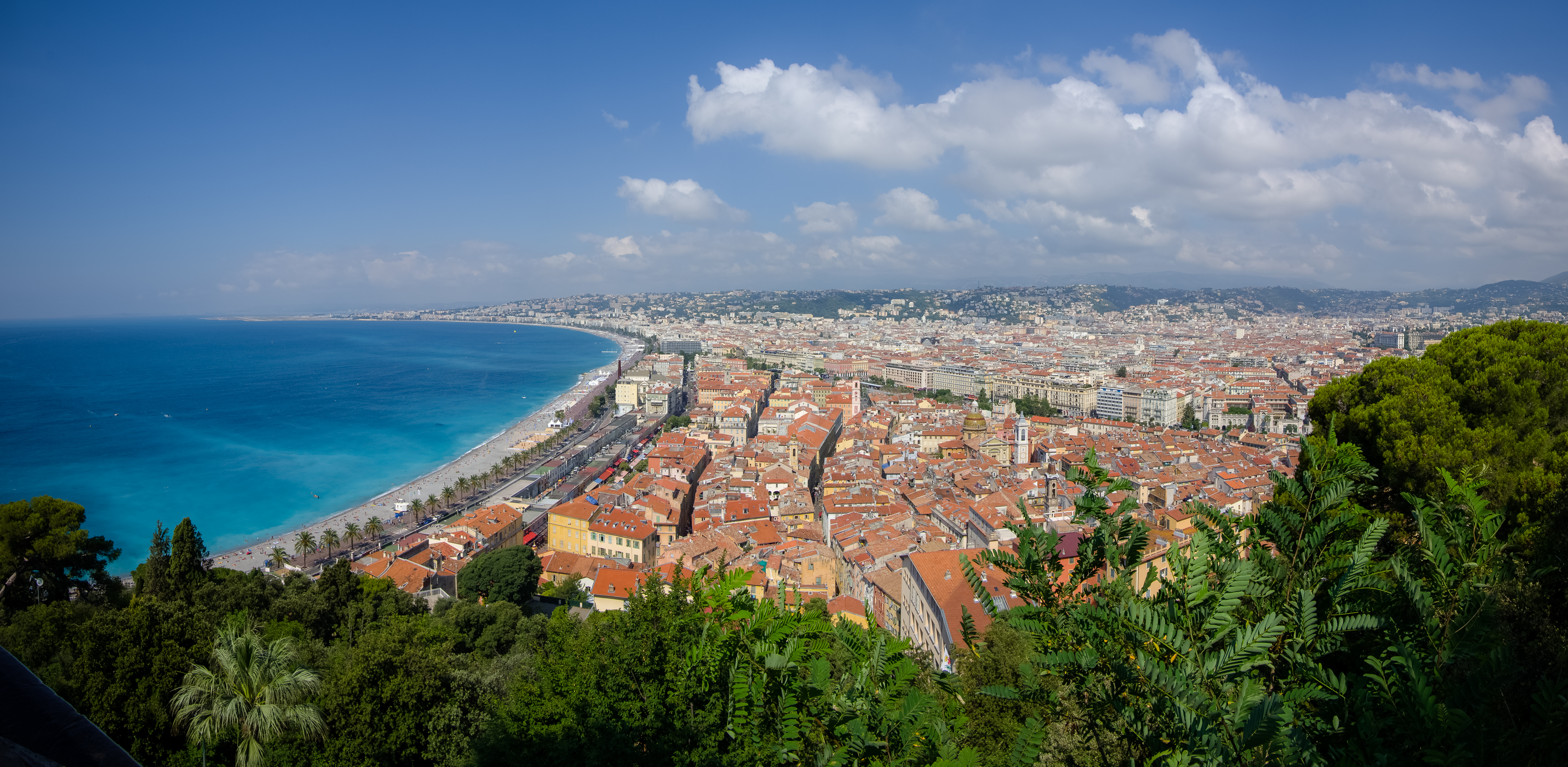
Nice

Lille

=== Villages ===
Les Plus Beaux Villages de France (English: "The most beautiful villages of France") is an independent association, created in 1982, that aims to promote small and picturesque French villages of quality heritage. As of 2008, 152 villages in France have been labelled as the "Plus Beaux Villages de France".

There are a few criteria before entering the association: the population of the village must not exceed 2,000 inhabitants, there must be at least two protected areas (picturesque or legendary sites, or sites of scientific, artistic or historic interest), and the decision to apply must be taken by the municipal council.

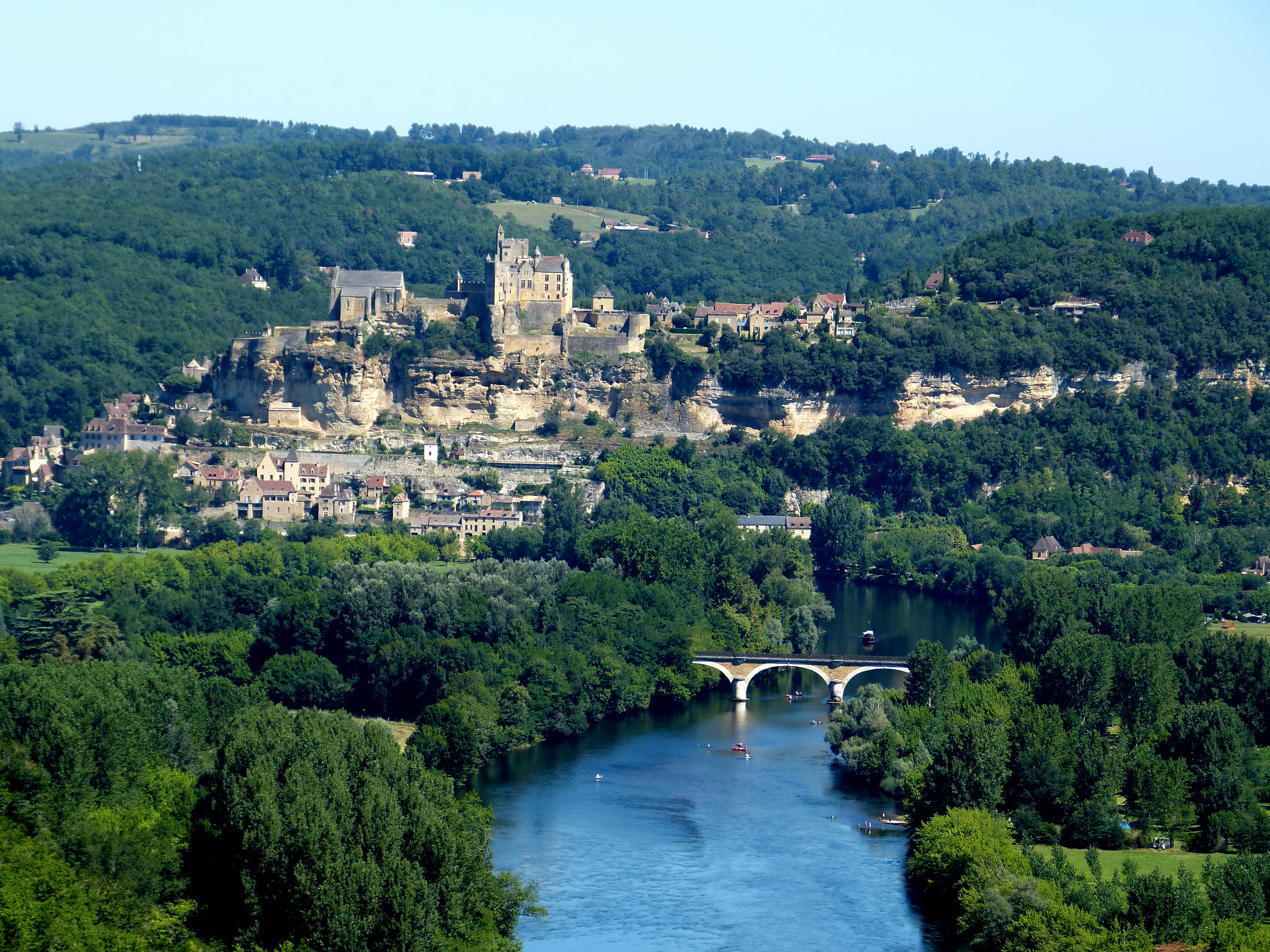
Beynac-et-Cazenac, Dordogne

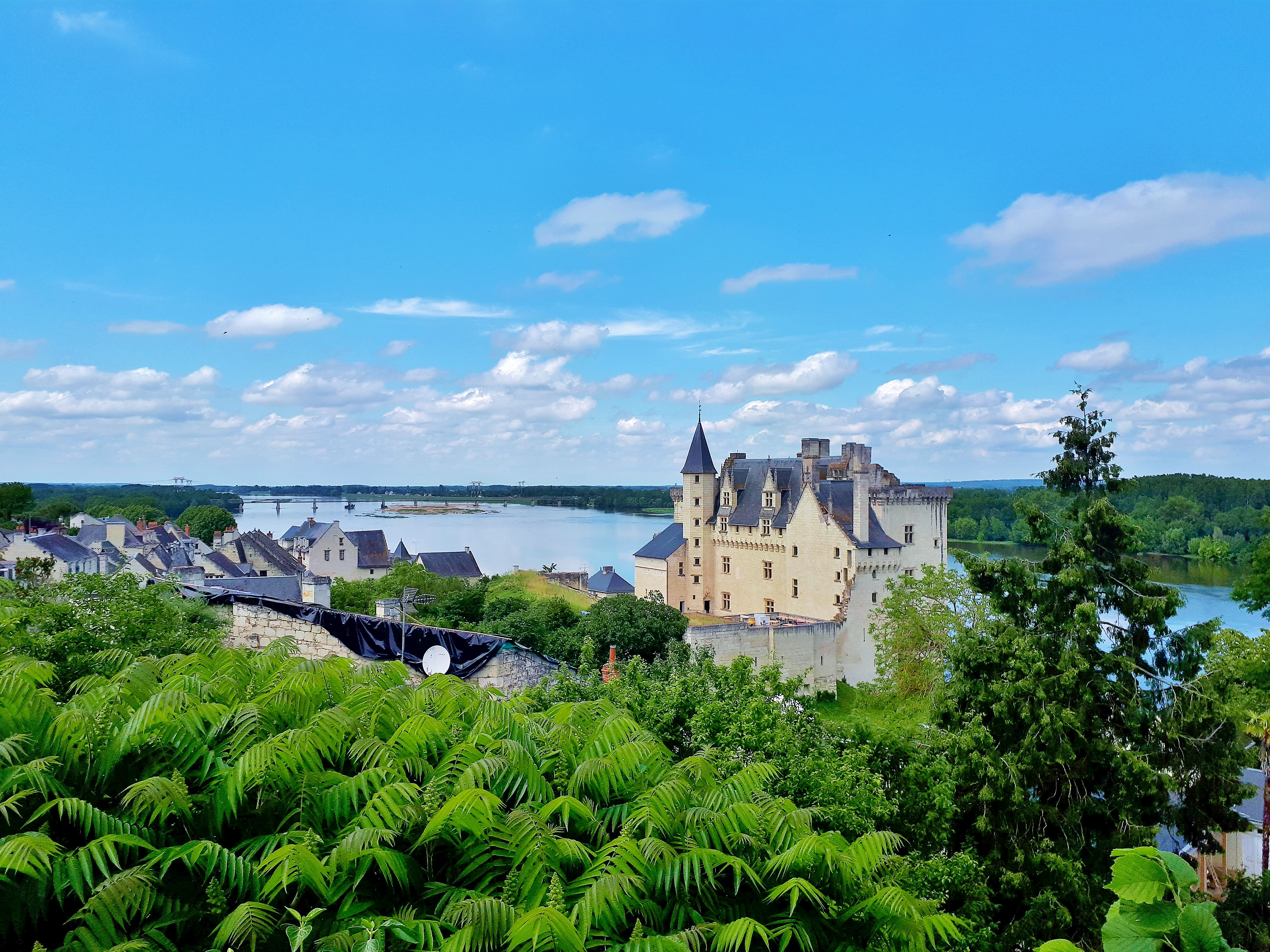
Montsoreau, Maine-et-Loire

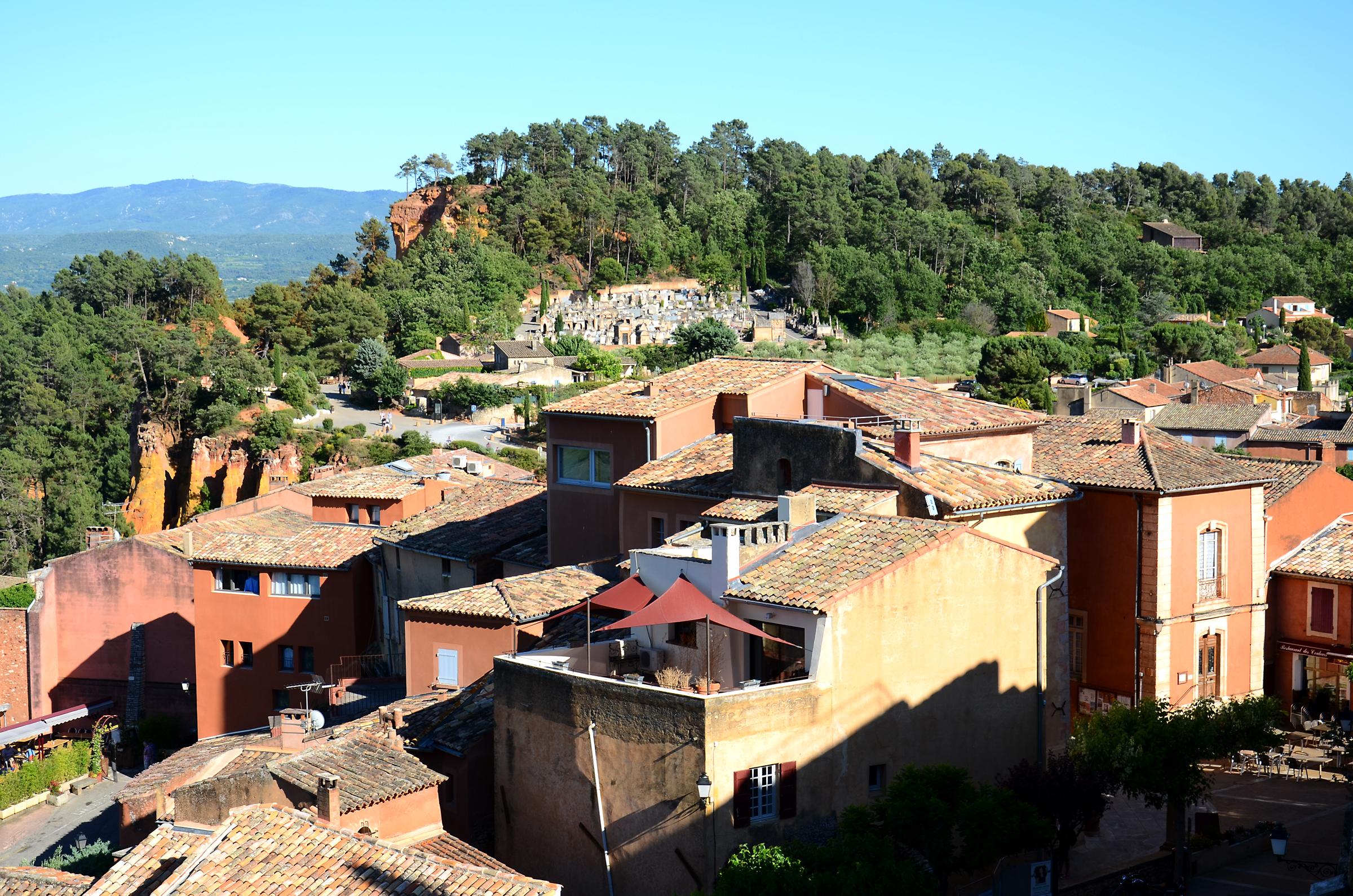
Roussillon, Vaucluse

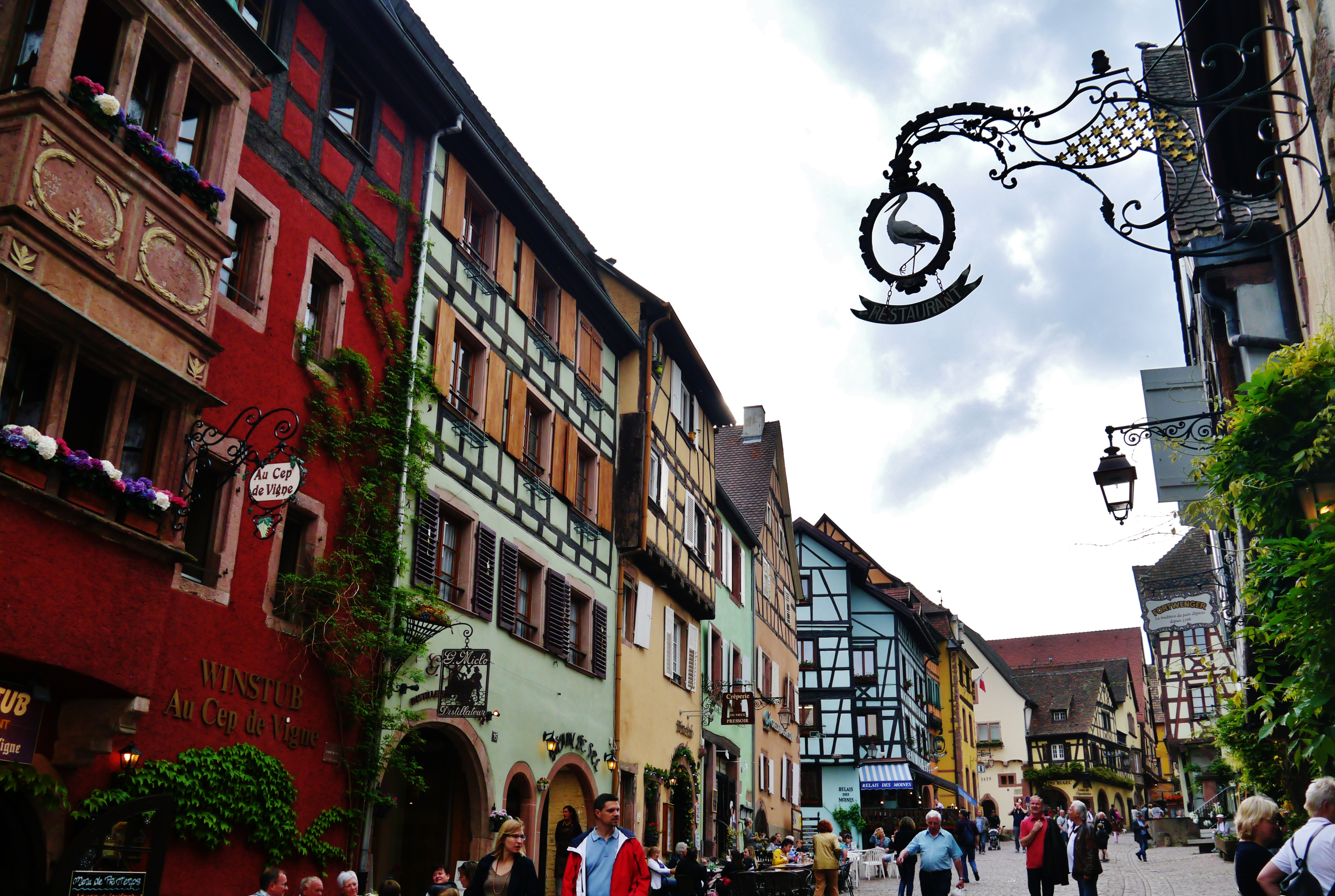
Riquewihr, Haut-Rhin

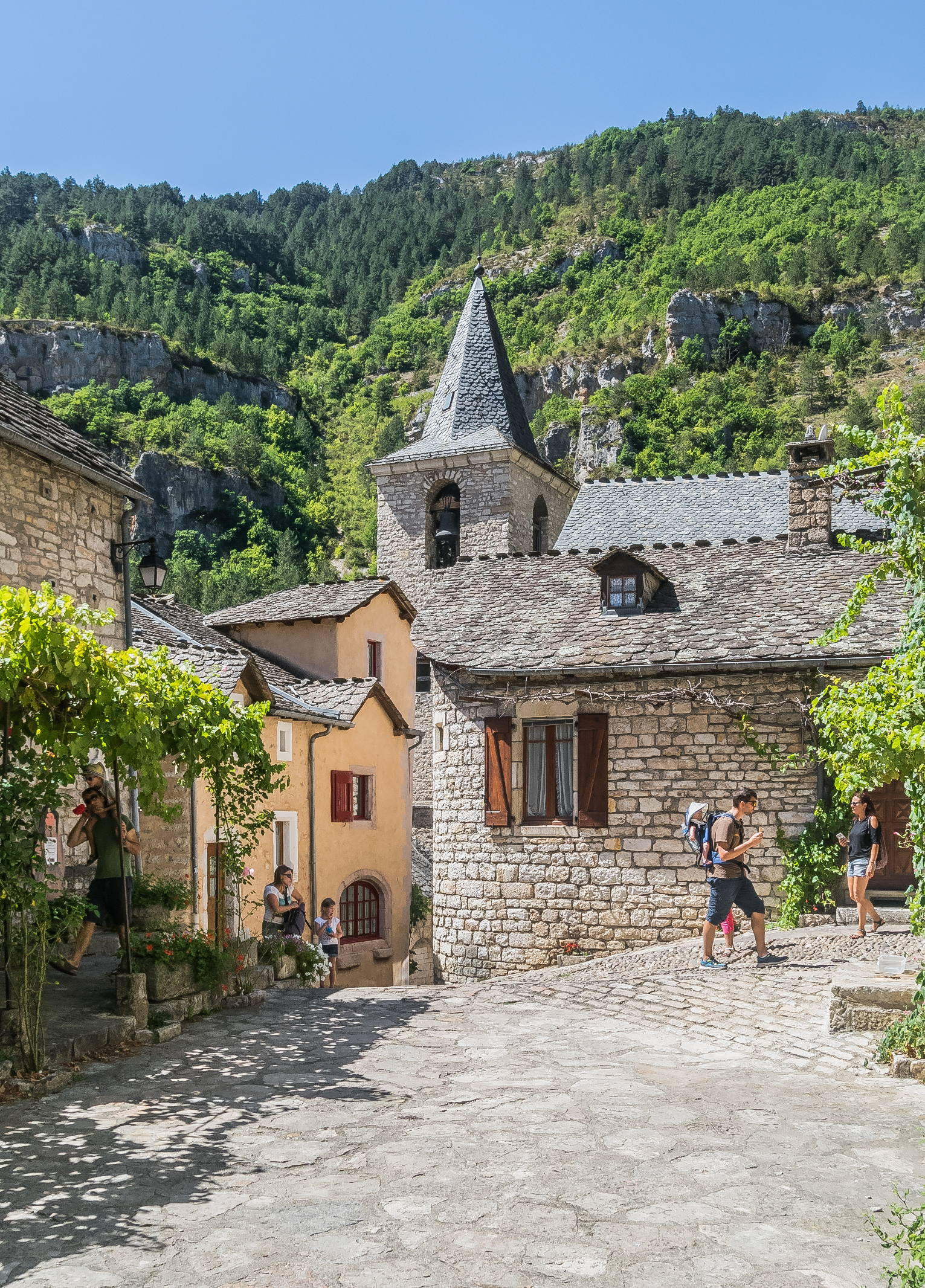
Sainte-Enimie, Lozère

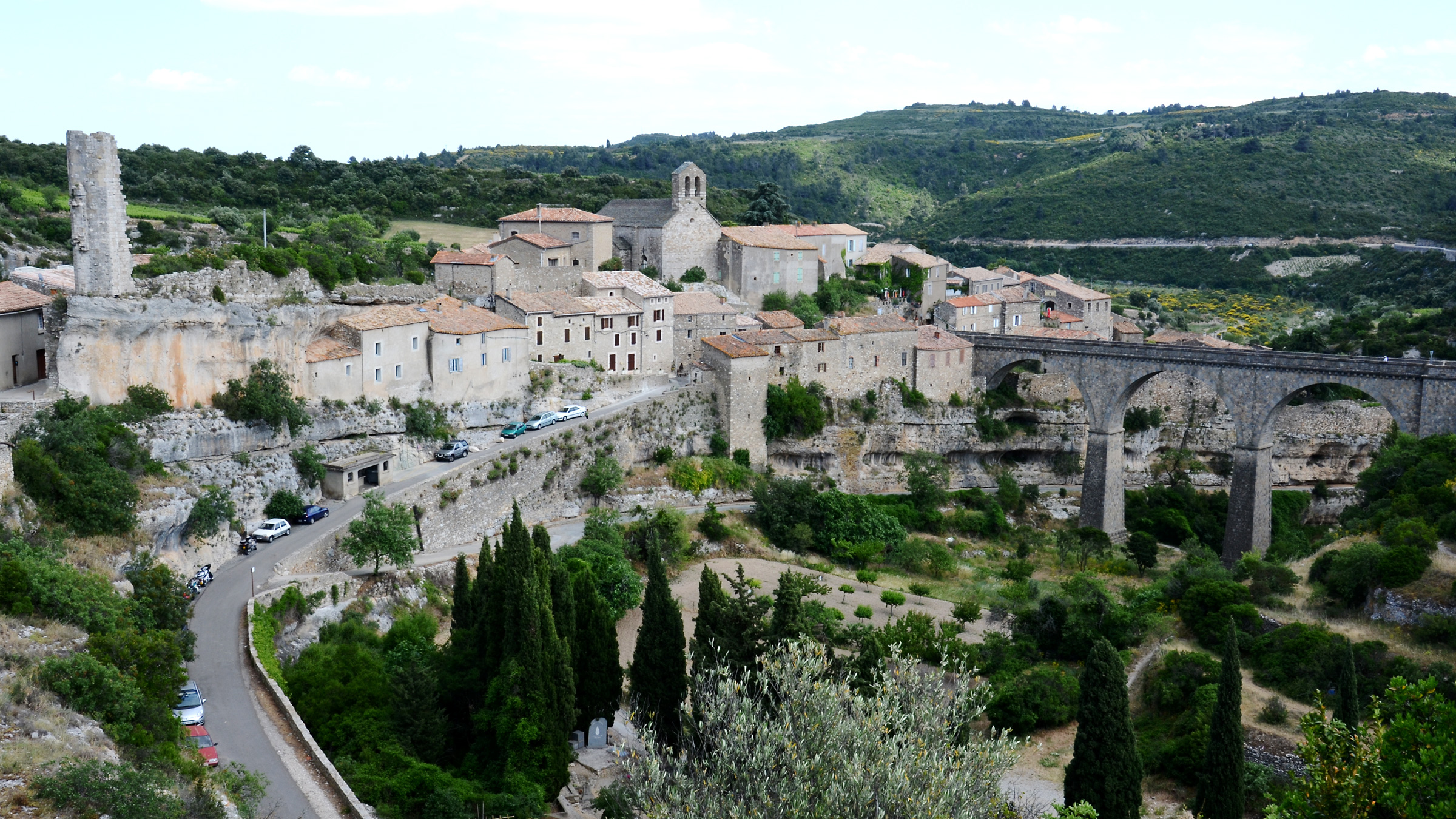
Minerve, Hérault

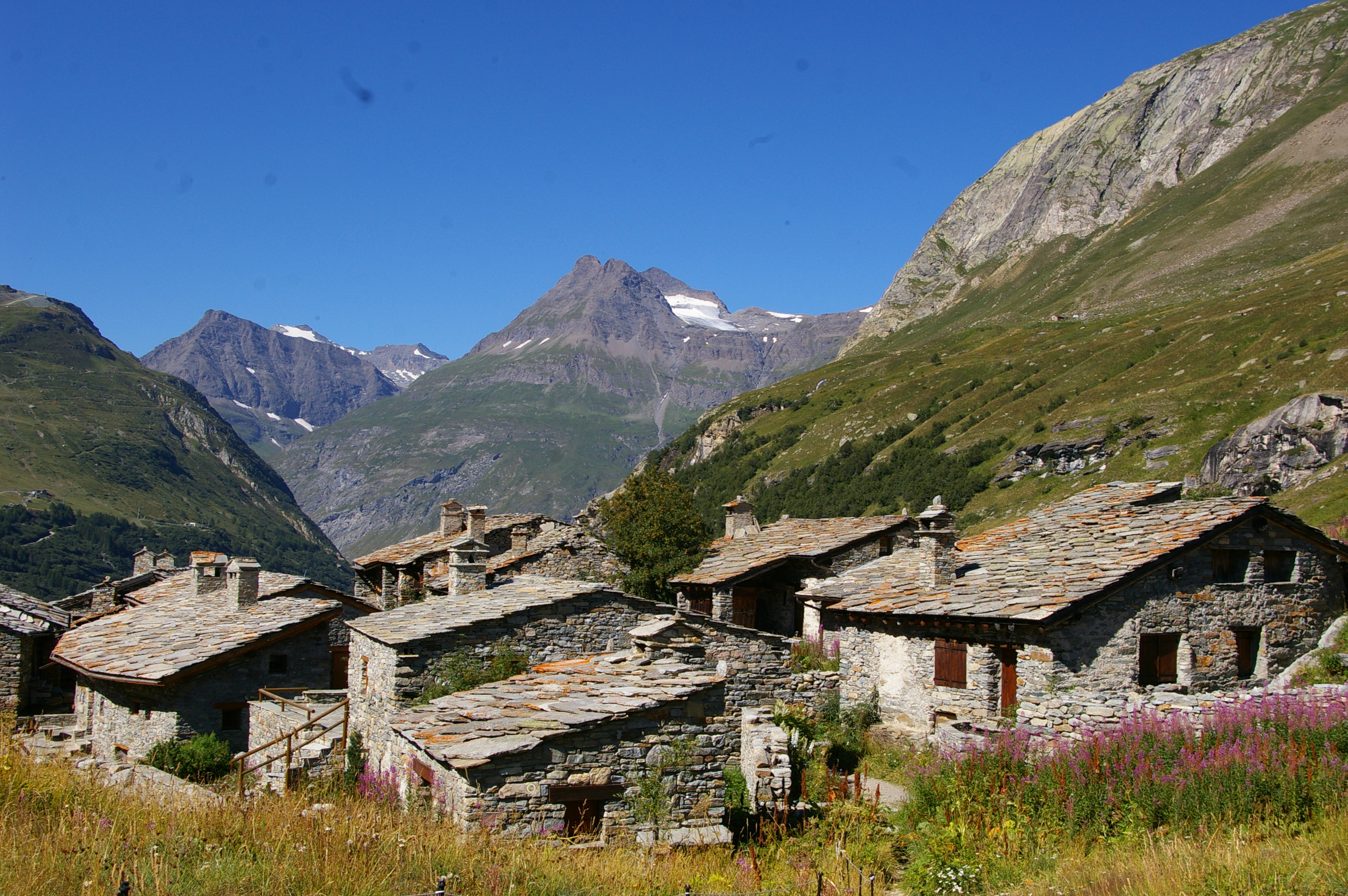
Bonneval-sur-Arc, Savoie

== Specific destinations ==
=== Religious sites ===
France attracts many religious pilgrims along the Way of St. James, or to Lourdes, a town in the Hautes-Pyrénées that hosts a few million visitors a year. The Taizé Community has become one of the world's most important sites of Christian pilgrimage. Over 100,000 young people from around the world make pilgrimages to Taizé each year for prayer, Bible study, sharing, and communal work.

=== Theme parks ===
Disneyland Paris is France's and Europe's most popular theme park, with 15,405,000 combined visitors to the resort's Disneyland Park and Disney Adventure World in 2009. In 2019, the park attracted over 9.7 million visitors, more than the Eiffel Tower, the Louvre, or the Palace of Versailles. The historical theme park Puy du Fou in Vendée is the second most visited park of France. Other popular theme parks are the Futuroscope of Poitiers, Vulcania in Auvergne-Rhône-Alpes and the Parc Astérix near Paris.

== Most popular tourist attractions ==
The most popular tourist sites include (visitors per year):

- Notre-Dame de Paris (13.6 million)
- Basilique du Sacré-Coeur (10.5 million)
- Louvre Museum (8.5 million)
- Eiffel Tower (6.2 million)
- Palace of Versailles (6 million)
- Centre Pompidou (3.6 million)
- Musée d'Orsay (2.9 million)
- Musée du quai Branly (1.3 million)
- Arc de Triomphe (1.2 million)
- Mont Saint-Michel (1 million)
- Notre-Dame de la Garde (800,000)
- Château de Chambord (711,000)
- Sainte-Chapelle (683,000)
- Metz Cathedral (652,000)
- Bastille of Grenoble (600 000)
- Centre Pompidou-Metz (550,000)
- Château du Haut-Kœnigsbourg (549,000)
- Puy de Dôme (500,000)
- Musée Picasso (441,000)
- Carcassonne (362,000)

== Gallery ==
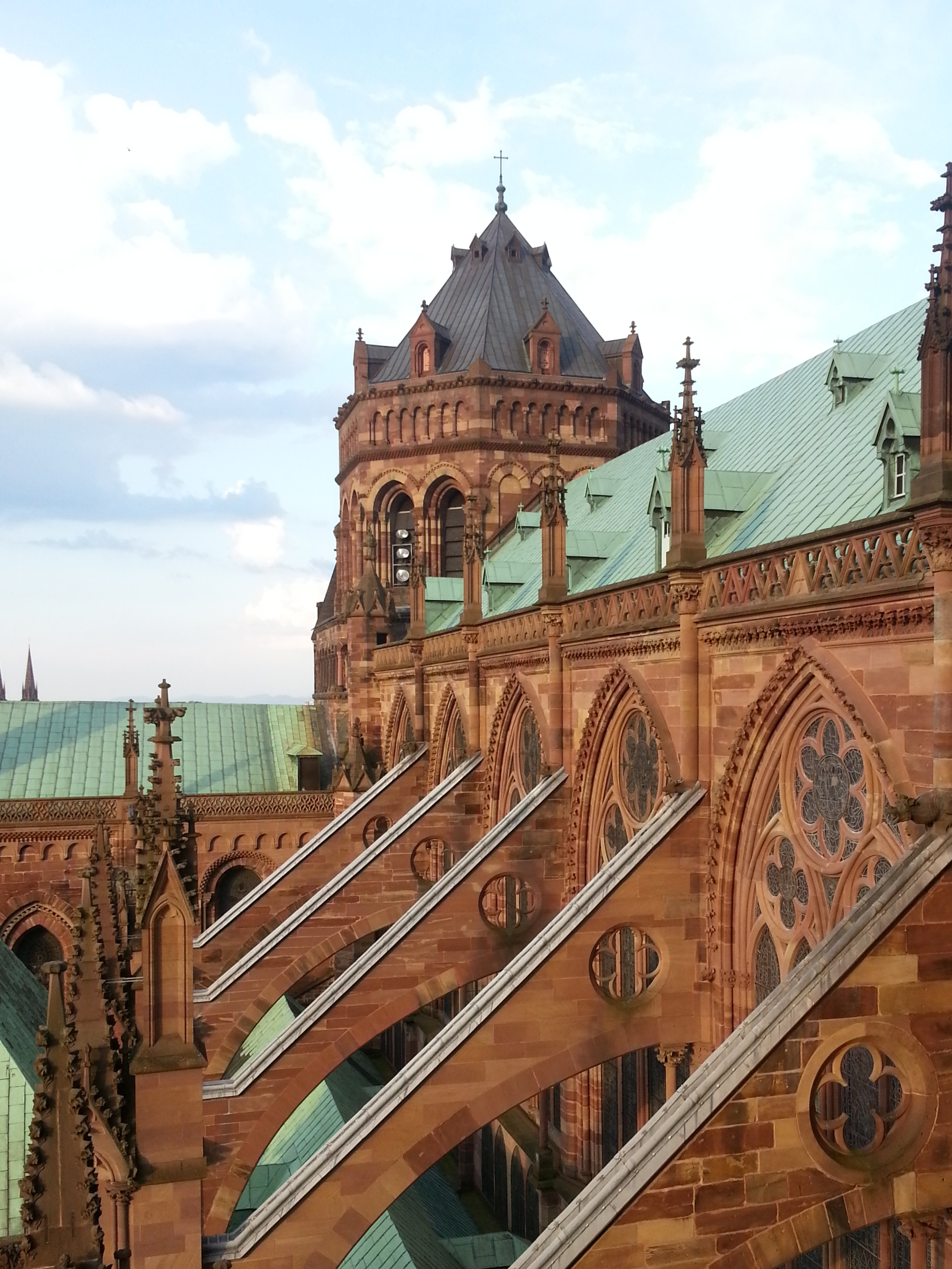
Strasbourg Cathedral

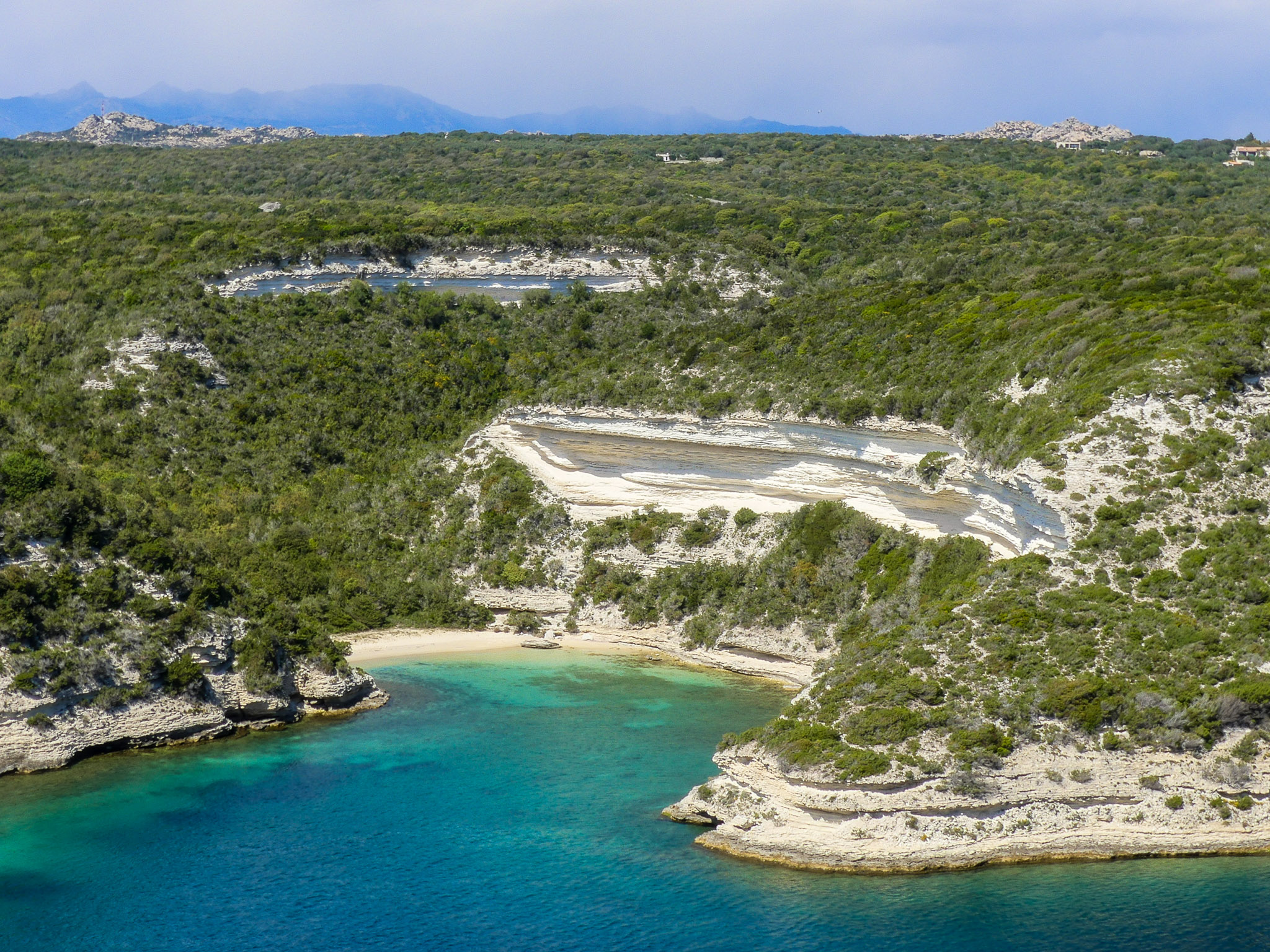
Bonifacio

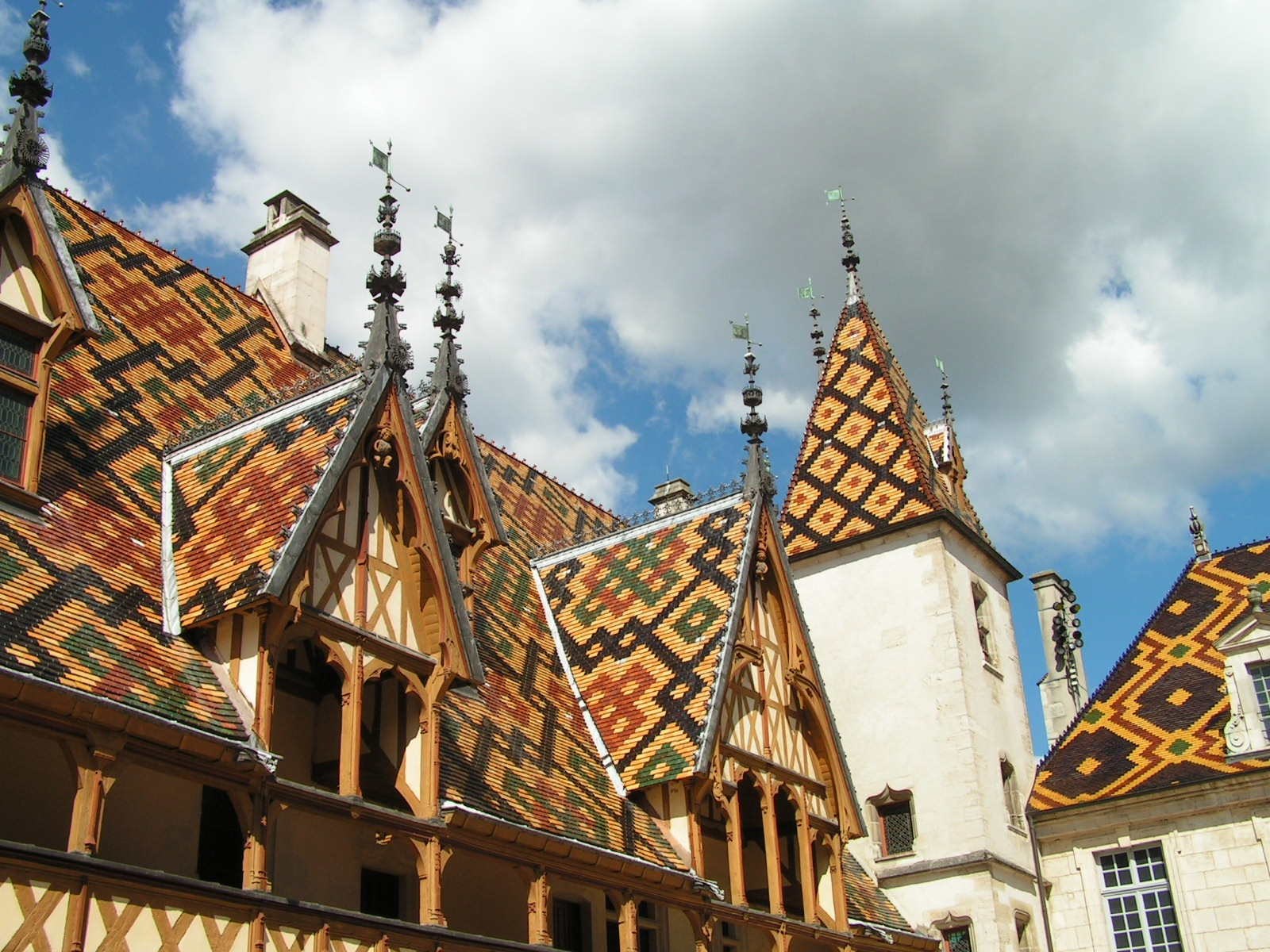
The polychrome roofs of the Hospices of Beaune

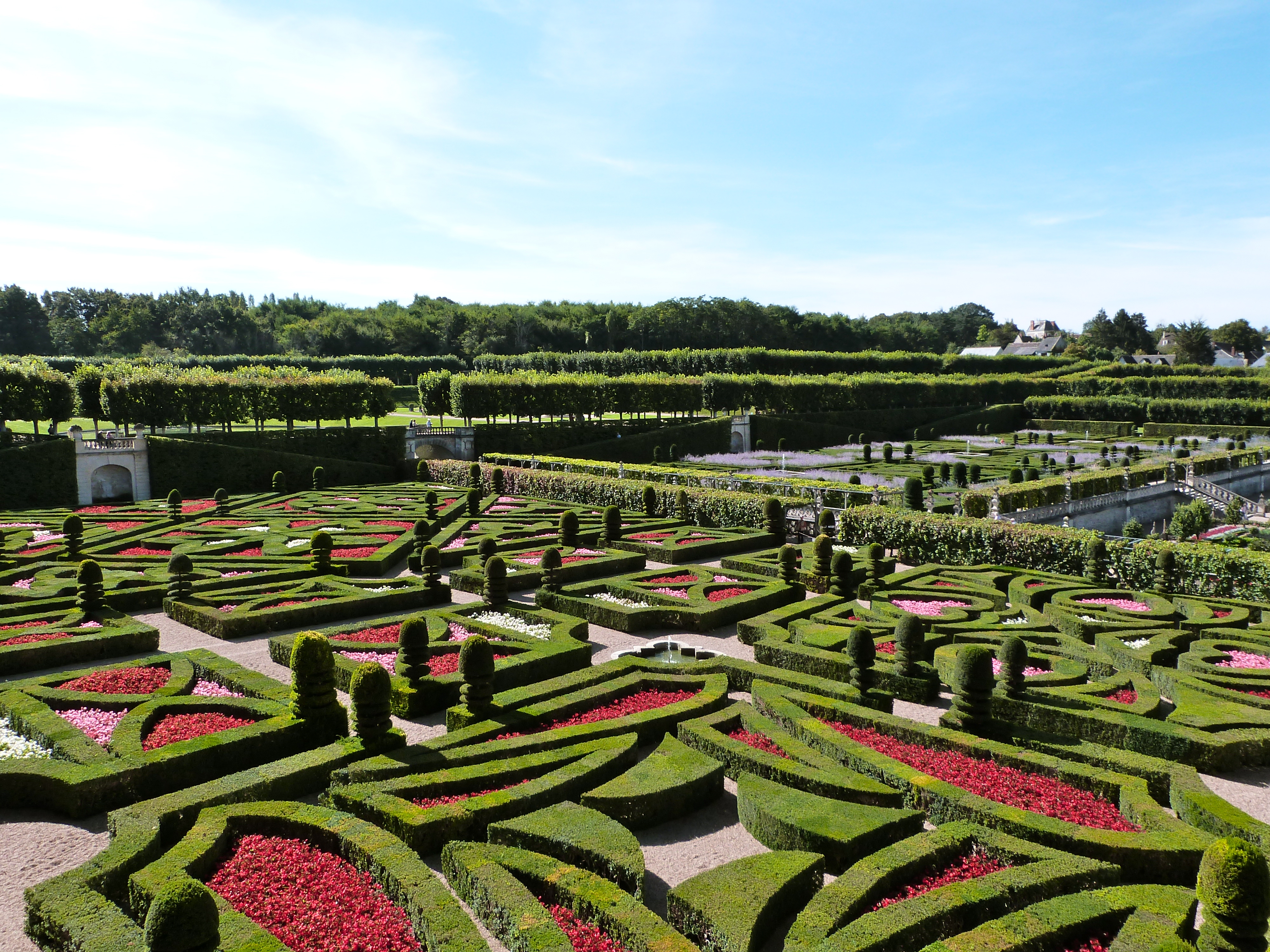
French formal garden of the Château de Villandry

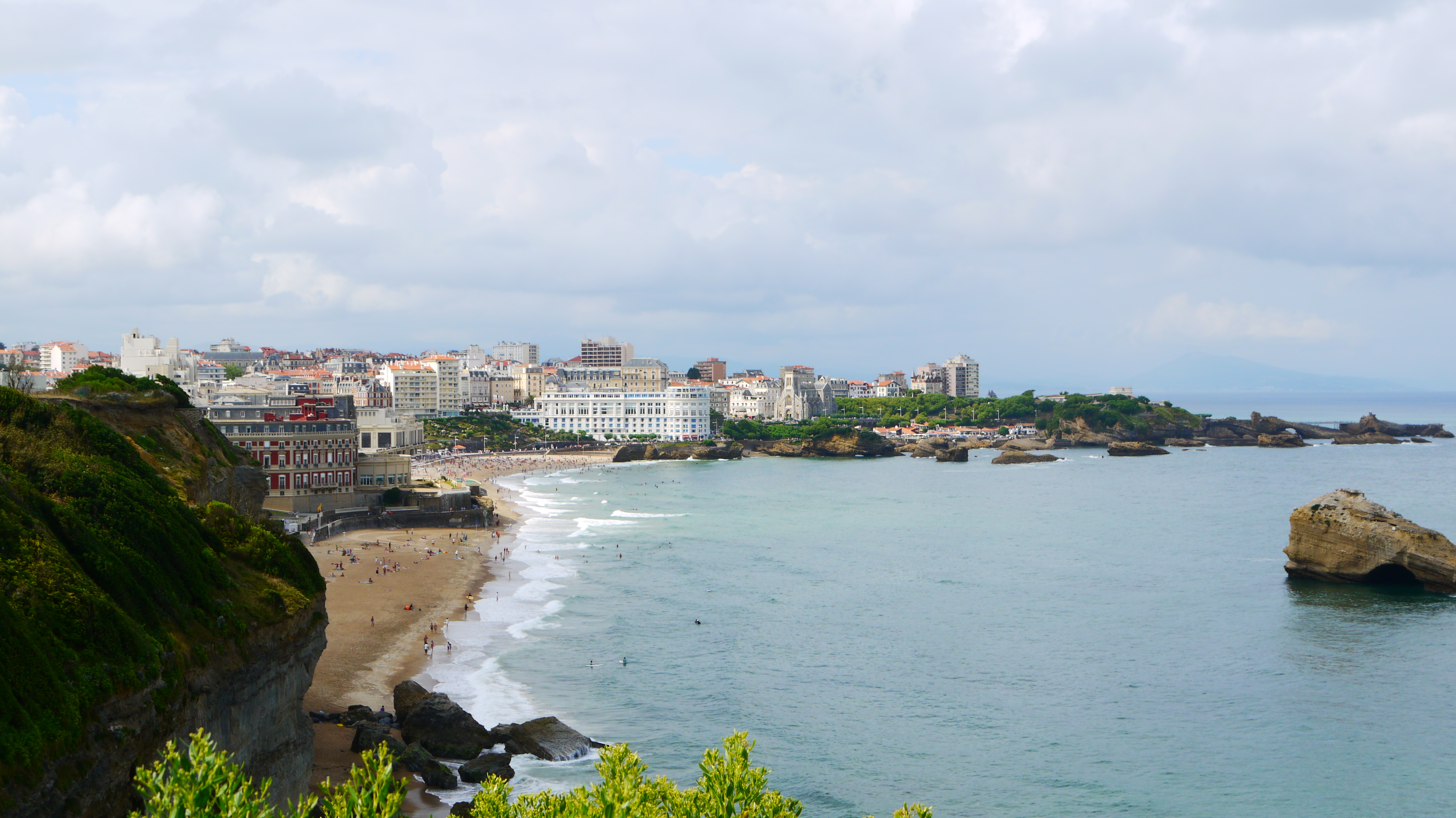
Biarritz

Centre Pompidou-Metz

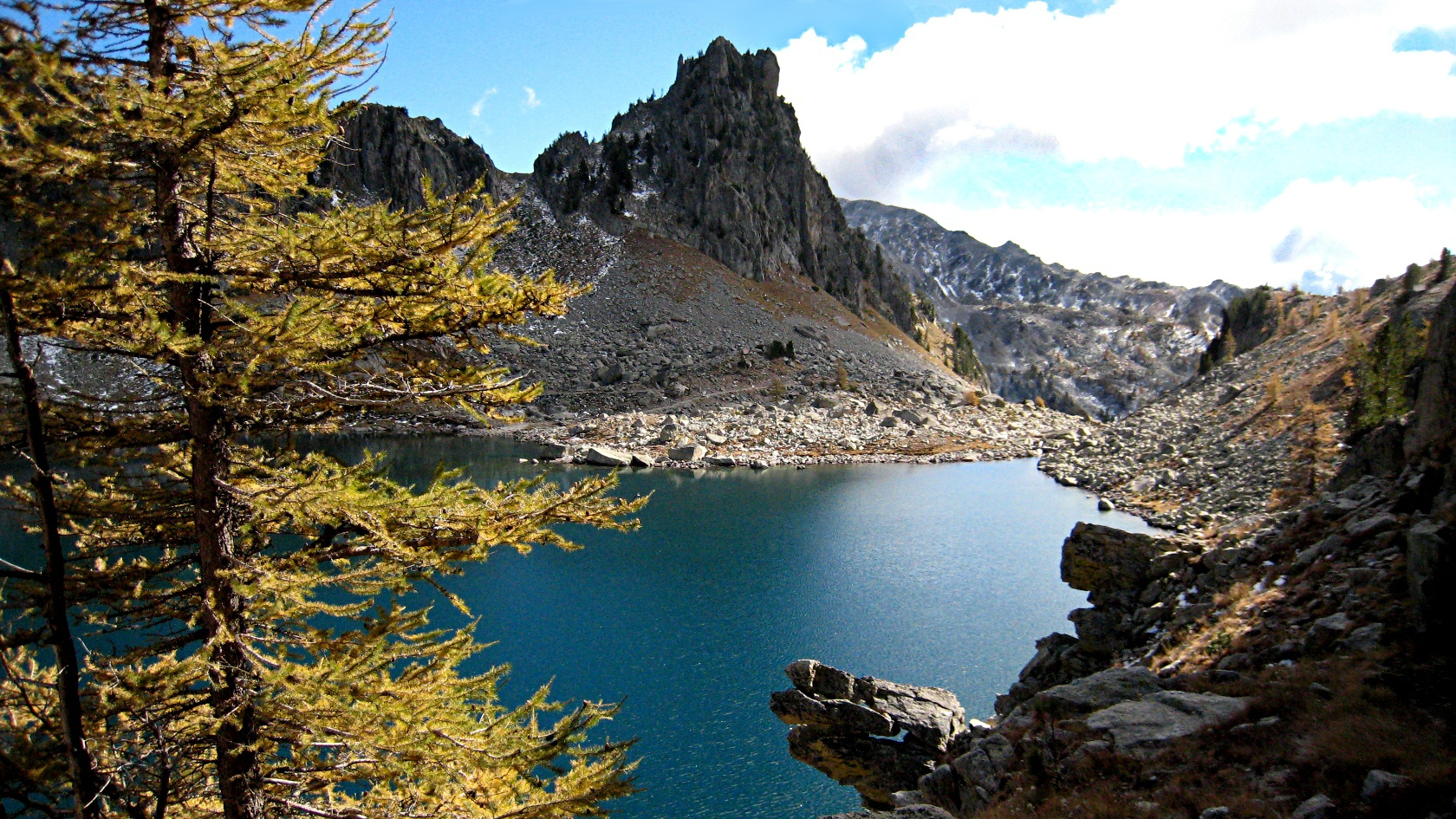
Mercantour National Park

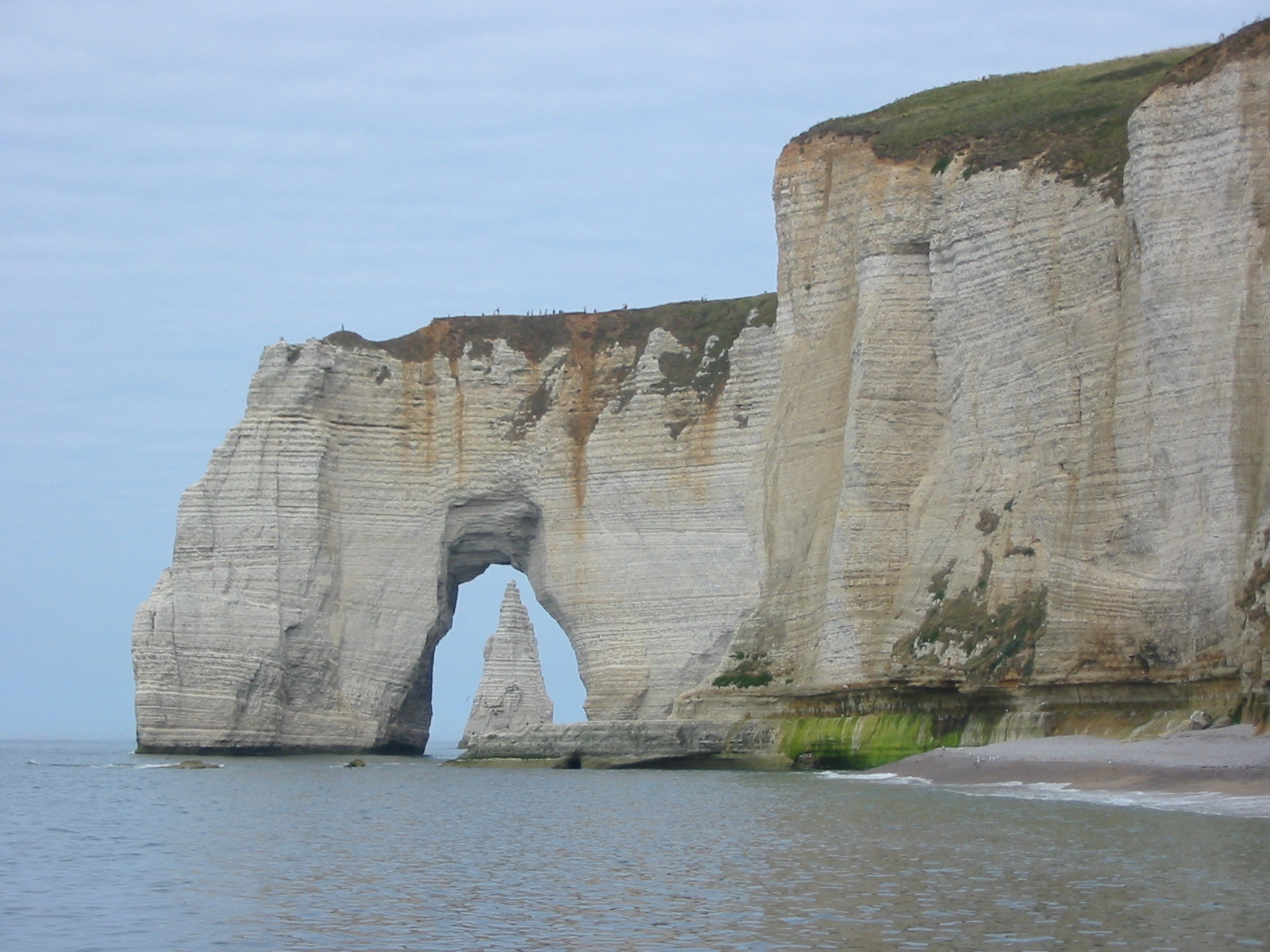
Limestone cliffs in Étretat

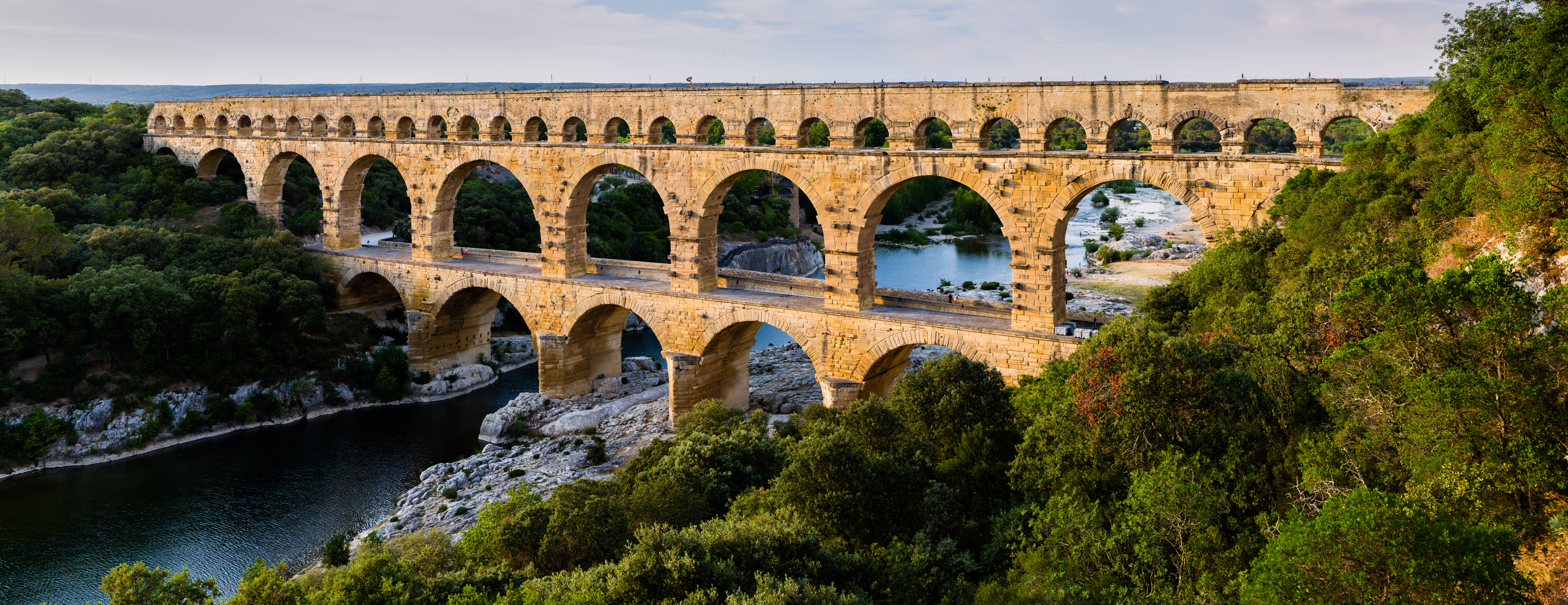
The Pont du Gard, a Roman vestige

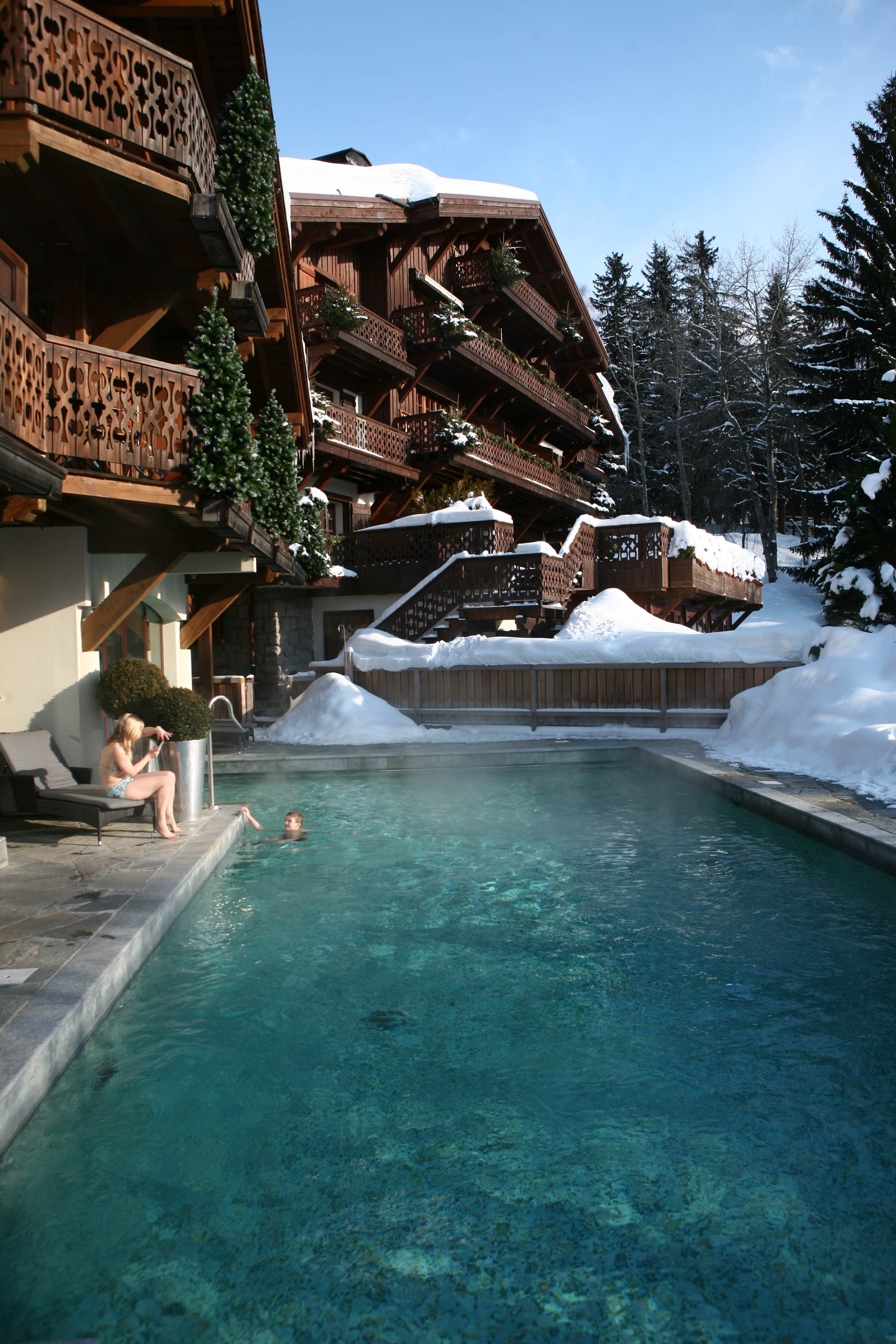
Ski resort in Megève

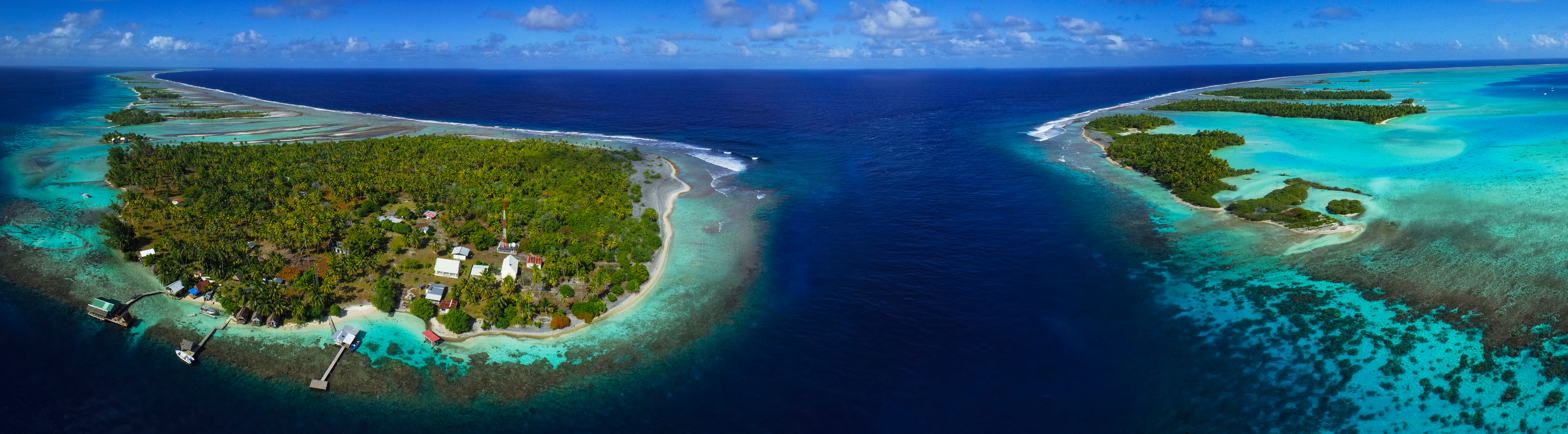
Fakarava in French Polynesia

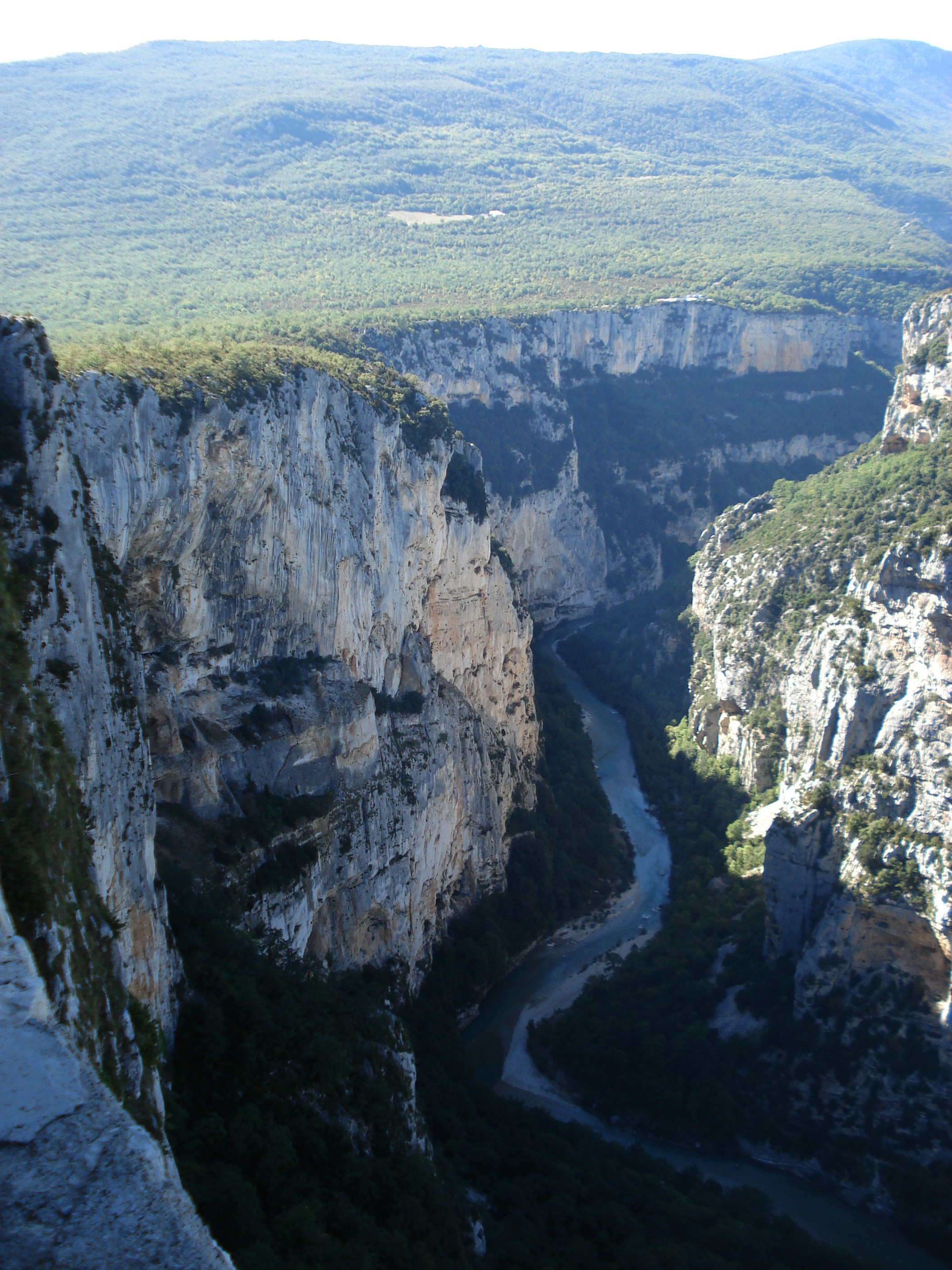
The Verdon Gorge is a popular destination for kayaking

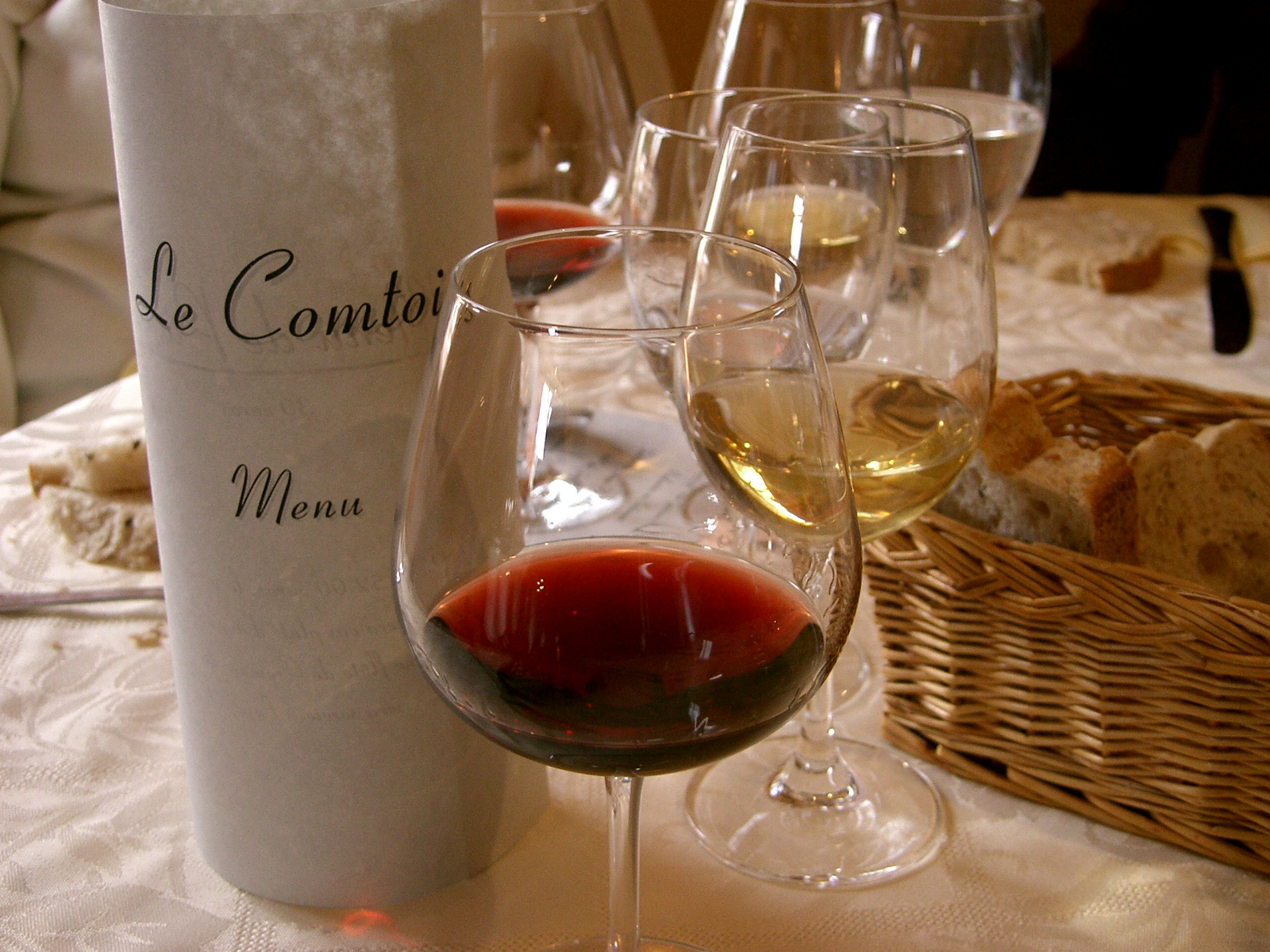
French wine

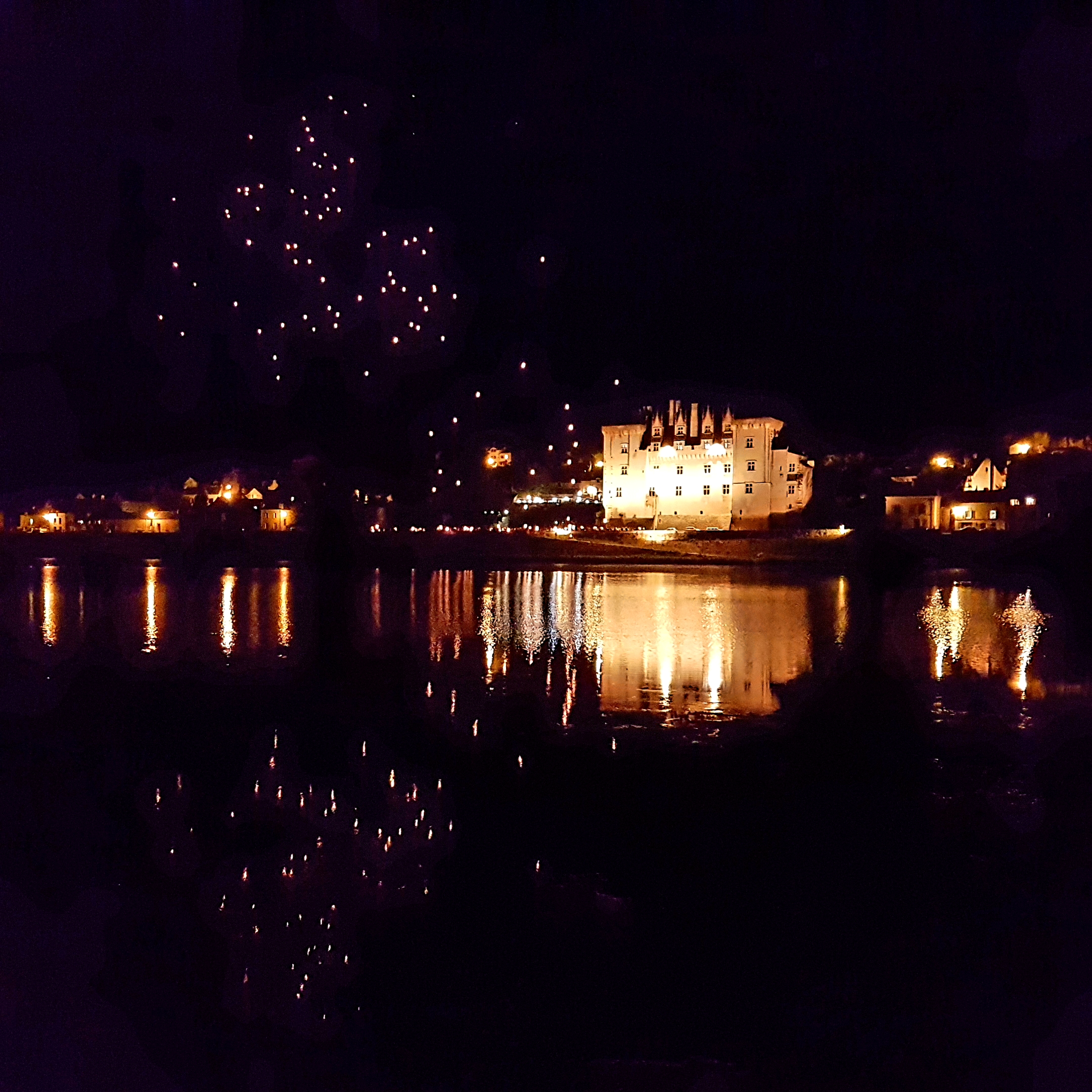
Château de Montsoreau-Museum of Contemporary Art Sky lantern Festival, in Loire Valley

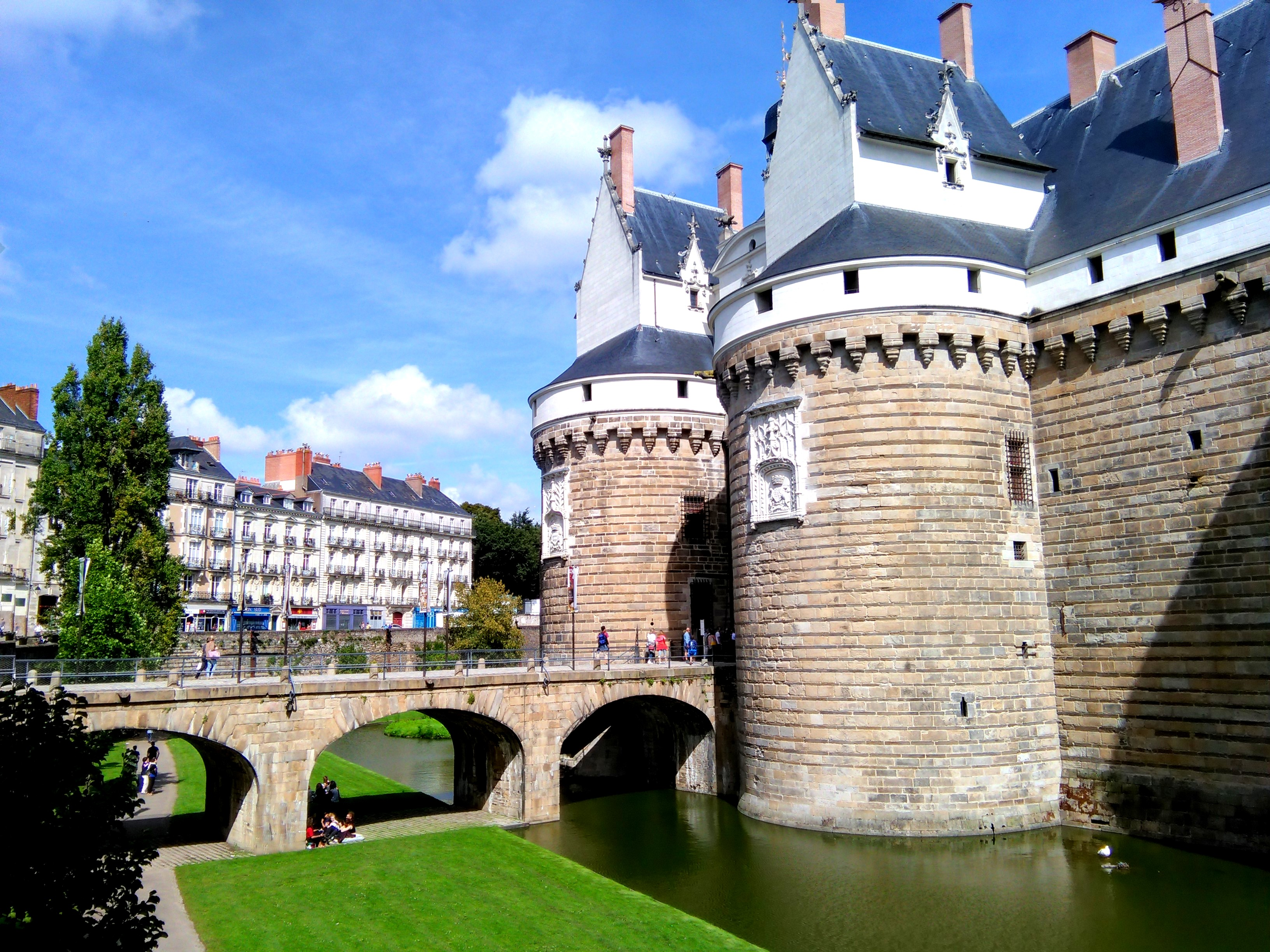
Château des ducs de Bretagne

Lascaux

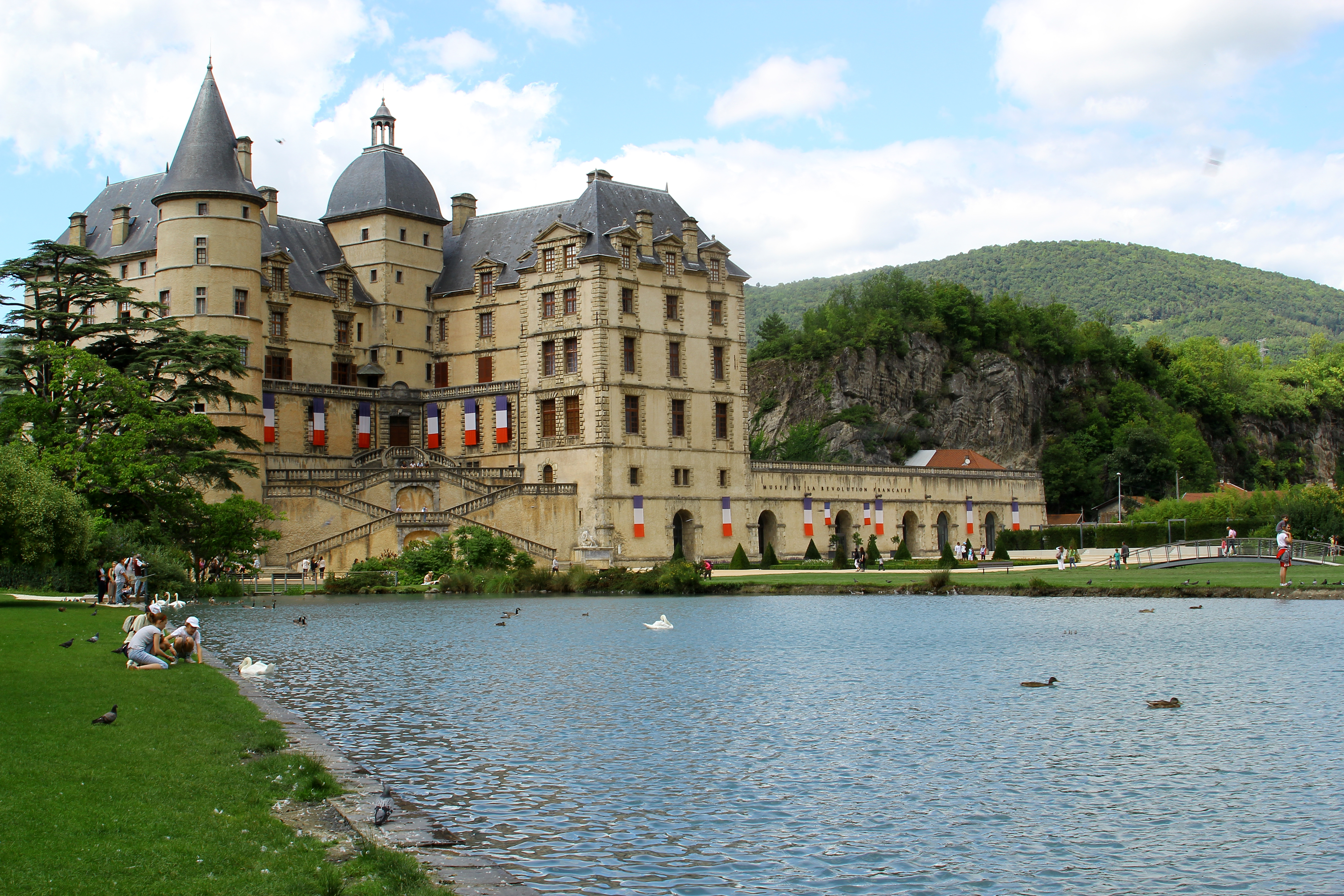
Musée de la Révolution française

== See also ==
- List of museums in France
- List of castles in France
- List of cathedrals in France
- List of basilicas in France
- List of medieval bridges in France
- List of spa towns in France
- List of ski resorts in France
- List of World Heritage Sites in France
- National parks of France
- Regional natural parks of France
- Tourism in Brittany
- Tourism in Guadeloupe
- Tourism in Martinique
- Tourism in Mayotte
- Tourism in New Caledonia
- Tourism in Réunion
- Tourism in Saint Barthélemy
- Tourism in Saint Martin
