= List of World Heritage Sites in France =

The United Nations Educational, Scientific and Cultural Organization (UNESCO) World Heritage Sites are places of importance to cultural or natural heritage as described in the UNESCO World Heritage Convention, established in 1972. Cultural heritage consists of monuments (such as architectural works, monumental sculptures, or inscriptions), groups of buildings, and sites (including archaeological sites). Natural features (consisting of physical and biological formations), geological and physiographical formations (including habitats of threatened species of animals and plants), and natural sites which are important from the point of view of science, conservation or natural beauty, are defined as natural heritage. France accepted the Convention Concerning the Protection of the World Cultural and Natural Heritage on 27 June 1975.

Out of 56 properties currently listed in France, 47 are cultural sites, 7 are natural, and 2 are (mixed), listed both for their cultural and natural significance. Of these sites, 50 are in the Metropolitan France while six are overseas. In addition, six properties are shared with other countries: Pyrénées – Mont Perdu is shared with Spain; Belfries of Belgium and France is shared with Belgium; Prehistoric Pile dwellings around the Alps is shared with five countries; The Architectural Work of Le Corbusier is shared with six countries; Funerary and memory sites of the First World War (Western Front) is shared with Belgium; Ancient and Primeval Beech Forests of the Carpathians and Other Regions of Europe is shared with 17 countries. The first five sites in France were added to the list in 1979 while the most recent, the Beaches of the D-Day Landings and the Royal Capetian Fortresses of Languedoc, were added in 2026. France also has 32 sites on its tentative list. France has served on the World Heritage Committee five times. With 56 World Heritage Sites, France ranks third worldwide by number of sites, behind Italy and China.

Location of World Heritage sites within metropolitan France. Small green dots indicate the Belfries of Belgium and France, orange dots are the Primeval Beech Forests, blue are the Prehistoric pile dwellings, black are the Fortifications of Vauban, cyan are the Work of Le Corbusier, purple are the Champagne hillsides, houses and cellars, grey are the D-Day Landing Beaches, and pink are the Royal Capetian Fortresses of Languedoc. The Châteaux of the Loire Valley are located between Chalonnes-sur-Loire and Sully-sur-Loire which are marked. The Funerary and memory sites of the First World War (Western Front) (96 sites in France), Canal du Midi, and the Routes of Santiago de Compostela in France are not shown on the map. For Nord-Pas de Calais Mining Basin with over 100 sites, the approximate location is shown.
Location of French World Heritage Sites overseas. Blue dots are the Te Henua Enata islands, purple are the Lagoons of New Caledonia, and orange are the Austral Lands and Seas.

== World Heritage Sites ==
UNESCO lists sites under ten criteria; each entry must meet at least one of the criteria. Criteria i through vi are cultural, and vii through x are natural.

* Transnational site

World Heritage Sites
Site	Image	Location (region)	Year listed	UNESCO data	Description
Mont-Saint-Michel and its Bay	Look at an island with a medieval church and houses from distance	Normandy	1979	80ter; i, iii, vi (cultural)	The Mont-Saint-Michel Abbey and the surrounding village are located on a small tidal island. The abbey was founded in 966. The present buildings are mostly in the Gothic style and feature prominently in the surrounding landscape. Through medieval history, it was an important pilgrimage site and a site of strong intellectual and artistic influence. Minor boundary modifications of the site took place in 2007 and 2018.
Chartres Cathedral	A large Gothic cathedral with two spires	Centre-Val de Loire	1979	81bis; i, ii, iv (cultural)	Chartres Cathedral is one of the best examples of French Gothic architecture and it was highly influential in the development of Gothic art both in France in abroad. It was constructed in the 12th century and features well-preserved stained glass windows from the 12th and 13th centuries. A minor boundary modification of the site took place in 2009.
Palace and Park of Versailles	A pond and a statue in front of a Baroque palace	Île-de-France	1979	83bis ; i, ii, vi (cultural)	The palace was commissioned by King Louis XIV in the second half of the 17th century and remained the principal residence of the French kings until the deposition of King Louis XVI. Several buildings of the ensemble, including the Grand Trianon and the Orangerie, were designed by the architect Jules Hardouin-Mansart. The Gardens of Versailles were designed by the landscape architect André Le Nôtre who formalized the typology of a French garden. Both the palace and the gardens were highly influential in the designs in France and abroad. A minor boundary modification took place in 2007.
Vézelay, Church and Hill	A Romanesque church with one bell tower on the left side	Bourgogne-Franche-Comté	1979	84bis; i, vi (cultural)	The 12th-century church is a masterpieces of Burgundian Romanesque art and architecture and is especially famous for its carved portal. Believed to hold the relics of Saint Mary Magdalene, the church was an important pilgrimage site while the town of Vézelay became a prominent regional centre. It was the site where Bernard of Clairvaux preached the Second Crusade in 1146 and the place where the French and English forces met before departing to the Third Crusade in 1190. A minor boundary modification of the site took place in 2007.
Prehistoric Sites and Decorated Caves of the Vézère Valley	Aurochs, horses and deer painted on a cave wall	Nouvelle-Aquitaine	1979	85bis; i, iii (cultural)	The area around the Vézère Valley is rich in archaeological sites, dating to different periods of the Palaeolithic, from 400,000 to 10,000 years ago. The most famous site is the Lascaux cave, featuring a series of cave paintings (example pictured), depicting hunting scenes. It was discovered in 1940. Other sites include Le Moustier, Abri de la Madeleine, and La Micoque. A minor boundary modification of the site took place in 2023.
Palace and Park of Fontainebleau	French-style park with a palace in the background	Île-de-France	1981	160bis; ii, vi (cultural)	The palace developed from a 12th-century royal hunting lodge. It was redesigned in the 16th century under King Francis I who brought Italian Renaissance artists to work on the decorations. This in turn influenced the French artists to develop their French Renaissance style. The palace remained a royal residence of the French sovereigns until the 19th century and was also the site of important historical events, such as the abdication of Napoleon in 1814. A minor boundary modification of the site took place in 2025.
Amiens Cathedral	A front view of a large Gothic cathedral with two bell towers and a prominently decorated facade	Hauts-de-France	1981	162bis; i, ii (cultural)	The cathedral is one of the most complete Gothic churches in France. Constructed in the 13th century, it introduced new approaches in bringing light to the interior of the building. It was influential in the later development of Gothic architecture, as well as a predecessor of the Flamboyant style. It features prominent sculptural assemblies on the facade and a rich stained glass decoration. A minor boundary modification of the site took place in 2013.
Roman Theatre and its Surroundings and the "Triumphal Arch" of Orange	A Roman theatre, look from above	Provence-Alpes-Côte d'Azur	1981	163bis; iii, vi (cultural)	The Theatre (pictured) and the Triumphal Arch were constructed in the early 1st century CE, under the Roman Emperor Augustus. The Arch is an important example of a provincial triumphal arches and is decorated with low reliefs commemorating the establishment of the Pax Romana. The Theatre is one of the best preserved Roman theatres. Both structures were restored in the 19th century. A minor boundary modification of the site took place in 2007.
Arles, Roman and Romanesque Monuments	A Roman amphitheater with a tower added in a later period	Provence-Alpes-Côte d'Azur	1981	164bis; ii, iv (cultural)	Arles was founded by the Romans. Numerous monuments date to the period between 1st century BCE and 1st century CE, including the Arles Amphitheatre (pictured) and Roman Theatre. The city was a regional political and religious capital in the late antiquity. In the Middle Ages, it again rose to prominence. Monuments from the previous eras were incorporated into a medieval city. The Church of St. Trophime is an important example of Provençal Romanesque architecture. A minor boundary modification of the site took place in 2025.
Cistercian Abbey of Fontenay	A Romanesque abbey with a park in front	Bourgogne-Franche-Comté	1981	165bis; iv (cultural)	The abbey was founded by Saint Bernard and it was constructed in the first half of the 12th century in the Romanesque style. It was one of the first monasteries of the Cistercians, a monastic order that was influential in the technological progress in the Middle Ages. The abbey was abandoned during the French Revolution and transformed into an industrial establishment. Restoration took place after 1906. A minor boundary modification of the site took place in 2007.
From the Great Saltworks of Salins-les-Bains to the Royal Saltworks of Arc-et-Senans, the Production of Open-pan Salt	An elaborate building with several columns in front	Bourgogne-Franche-Comté	1982	203bis; i, ii, iv (cultural)	This site comprises two components related to the production of salt from brine extracted from deep under the ground, from at least the Middle Ages to the 20th century. The Royal Saltworks from the late 18th century are the first example of industrial architecture incorporating the ideas of the Enlightenment by paying architectural attention to buildings which are not palaces or religious sites. The main building of the complex is pictured. Salins-les-Bains were added in 2009. From there, the brine was carried over 21 km (13 mi) by wooden pipes to Arc-et-Senans where it was evaporated using fire.
Abbey Church of Saint-Savin-sur-Gartempe	A Romanesque church with a Gothic spire	Nouvelle-Aquitaine	1983	230quater; i, iii (cultural)	The Romanesque church from the 11th century features exceptional frescoes from the 11th and 12th centuries, depicting Biblical narratives and stories about Christian saints. Because of them, the church was nicknamed the "Romanesque Sistine Chapel". When constructed, the abbey was a major educational centre. Boundaries of the site were modified three times.
Place Stanislas, Place de la Carrière, and Place d'Alliance in Nancy	Night view of a palace and an ornate gate on the right	Grand Est	1983	229bis; i, iv (cultural)	The three squares in Nancy were constructed under the patronage of Stanisław Leszczyński, former King of Poland and later Duke of Lorraine, in the middle of the 18th century. Designed by the architect Emmanuel Héré, the ensembles illustrate the oldest and most characteristic example of urban planning incorporating the ideas of the Enlightenment where an enlightened monarch carried out a program of public spaces and buildings to meet the needs of the people. A minor boundary modification took place in 2016.
Gulf of Porto: Calanche of Piana, Gulf of Girolata, Scandola Reserve	Sea shore with rocky outcrops	Corsica	1983	258; vii, viii, ix (natural)	The natural reserve on the coast of the Corsica island is an outstanding example of the maquis shrubland and is rich in biodiversity. The area is home to birds while the sea is rich in marine species. Scandola Nature Reserve is pictured.
Pont du Gard (Roman Aqueduct)	A Roman aqueduct crossing a river	Occitania	1985	344bis; i, ii, iv (cultural)	The bridge was a part of the Roman aqueduct carrying water to the Roman colony of Nemausus, today the city of Nîmes. It was constructed in the middle of the 1st century CE. The bridge that crosses the river Gardon, is a three-storey structure with a height of 50 m (160 ft) and a length of 275 m (902 ft). It is an exceptional feature of Roman engineering. A minor boundary modification of the site took place in 2007.
Strasbourg, Grande-Île and Neustadt	Bridge across a river with a tower at each side, a cathedral in the background	Grand Est	1988	495bis; ii, iv (cultural)	The city of Strasbourg was shaped by the French and Germanic influences through history. The Strasbourg Cathedral is a masterpiece of the Gothic architecture. There are Renaissance-style private residences built between the 15th and 17th centuries and Classicist buildings such as the Palais Rohan. The Neustadt district, added in 2017, was constructed during the German period and drew inspiration from Haussmann's renovation of Paris. The medieval Ponts Couverts are pictured.
Cathedral of Notre-Dame, Former Abbey of Saint-Remi, and Palace of Tau, Reims	Front facade of a richly decorated Gothic cathedral	Grand Est	1991	601, i, ii, iv (cultural)	The 13th century Reims Cathedral (front facade pictured) is a masterpiece of Gothic architecture, especially in view of integrating the architecture and sculptural decorations. The former Abbey, today a museum, houses the remains of Saint Remigius, the 6th century Bishop of Reims. It was also where the Holy Ampulla, used for the coronations of French kings, was stored. The Palace of Tau, the former archiepiscopal palace, also played a role in the coronation ceremonies. It was almost entirely rebuilt in the 17th century.
Paris, Banks of the Seine	View of Paris along the river, with the Eiffel Tower featuring prominently	Île-de-France	1991	600bis; i, ii, iv (cultural)	The historic centre of Paris along the Seine river features monuments from the Middle Ages to the 20th century. They include churches, such as the Gothic Notre-Dame de Paris and Sainte-Chapelle, bridges, including the Renaissance Pont Neuf, palaces, including the Louvre and Grand Palais, public spaces, such as the Place de la Concorde, and monuments, such as the Eiffel Tower. Haussmann's renovation of Paris in the second half of the 19th century, with wide squares and boulevards, inspired city planning worldwide, especially in Latin America. A minor boundary modification of the site took place in 2024.
Bourges Cathedral	A Gothic cathedral with rich sculptural decorations	Centre-Val de Loire	1992	635bis; i, iv (cultural)	The cathedral was built in the Gothic style in the 12th and 13th centuries. Even if it is stylistically outside the mainstream of the French Gothic, it was influential in the development of the architectural style. It is also renowned for its stained glass windows, dating from the 14th to 16th centuries. A minor boundary modification took place in 2013.
Historical centre of Avignon: Papal Palace, Episcopal Ensemble and Avignon Bridge	A large medieval fortified palace	Provence-Alpes-Côte d'Azur	1995	228rev ; i, ii, iv (cultural)	In the 14th century, Avignon was the seat of the Popes, as they left Rome for almost seven decades in an exceptional historical episode. This resulted in a cultural exchange, leaving a mark on arts and architecture. The site comprises the ensemble of the medieval historic centre of the city, the fortified Papal Palace (pictured) that features rich artwork, the Avignon Cathedral from the 12th century, and the remains of a medieval bridge across the Rhône river, of which only four arches remain.
Canal du Midi	A bridge with many arches crossing a river	Occitania	1996	770; i, ii, iv, vi (cultural)	Canal du Midi is a series of navigable waterways, with a length of 360 km (220 mi), connecting the Garonne river that flows into the Atlantic Ocean with the Étang de Thau at the Mediterranean Sea. Constructed between 1667 and 1694 during the reign of King Louis XIV, it represents a remarkable achievement of civil engineering. In addition, aesthetic aspects were taken into consideration during the construction, an approach rarely found elsewhere. The Orb Aqueduct is pictured.
Historic Fortified City of Carcassonne	Medieval fortified city on a hill and a bridge in front	Occitania	1997	345rev; ii, iv (cultural)	The fortified medieval citadel of Carcassonne dates mostly to the 13th century, with the defensive systems being built on ramparts from late antiquity. The citadel is important in the history of conservation science, as it underwent a long restoration campaign in the second half of the 19th century, under the supervision of Eugène Viollet-le-Duc, one of the founders of this discipline.
Historic site of Lyon	Look form above at historic houses and a church	Auvergne-Rhône-Alpes	1998	872; ii, iv (cultural)	Lyon was founded by the Romans in the 1st century BCE. Through history, the city was an important cultural and economic centre. Due to the fact that the city progressively expanded towards the east, historical districts from the medieval (Saint Jean quarter with the Lyon Cathedral pictured) and Renaissance (Vieux Lyon) periods, as well as from the 19th century, were preserved. Monuments include numerous churches, mansions, houses, and civic buildings.
Routes of Santiago de Compostela in France	A medieval abbey church and surrounding village in a hilly forest landscape	several sites	1998	868bis; ii, iv, vi (cultural)	This site comprises pilgrimage churches, sanctuaries, hospitals, road markers, and bridges along four main pilgrimage routes heading to Santiago de Compostela. The routes start from Paris, Vézelay, Le Puy, and Arles, and head to the Pyrenees. The sites along the route developed mainly between the 11th and 15th centuries. Several cities or churches along the routes are pilgrimage sites themselves. A minor boundary modification took place in 2025. The Abbey Church of Sainte-Foy in Conques is pictured.
Pyrénées – Mont Perdu*	High mountains above the tree line and a glacial valley	Occitania	1999	773bis; iii, iv, v, vii, viii (mixed)	The mountain landscape around Mont Perdu (Monte Perdido, pictured) is home to communities who have been practicing transhumance through centuries, and is frequented by Spanish farmers who graze their herds on the French side. This type of life was once widespread in mountainous parts of Europe, but is rare today. From the natural point of view, there are numerous geological landforms, such as deep canyons and cirques. There are meadows, forests, caves, and lakes that provide home to different groups of mountain flora and fauna. The site was initially listed in Spain; the French part around Gèdre was added in 1999.
Jurisdiction of Saint-Émilion	A look from above at a small village surrounded by vineyards	Nouvelle-Aquitaine	1999	932; iii, iv (cultural)	Viticulture was introduced to the region by the Romans and intensified in the Middle Ages. The area is located on the pilgrimage route to Santiago de Compostela, which resulted in several churches, hospices, and monasteries being built from the 11th century on. The cultural landscape developed around the wine production, with vineyards, châteaux, wine cellars, and houses for workers that mostly date to the early 19th century.
The Loire Valley between Sully-sur-Loire and Chalonnes	A highly decorated Renaissance chateau at the river	Centre-Val de Loire, Pays de la Loire	2000	933bis; i, ii, iv (cultural)	The middle part of the Loire Valley is a cultural landscape with rich cultural heritage. Along the river, there are numerous cities and castles ( châteaux), including Amboise, Angers, Blois, and Chambord (pictured). During the Middle Ages and the Renaissance, the Loire Valley was the seat of royal power and the site of the cultural exchanges between the Italian Mediterranean, France, and Flanders. The area was also influential in the development of garden and landscape art. A minor boundary modification took place in 2017.
Provins, Town of Medieval Fairs	Prominent town walls with defensive towers	Île-de-France	2001	873rev; ii, iv (cultural)	Provins is an authentic example of a medieval market town, where the annual Champagne fairs were organized since the 11th century. This period marked an increase in international trade in Europe, especially with the Mediterranean world. The entire town was designed in a way to support the trade and related activities, such as production of cloth and leather. There are merchant houses, warehouses, cellars, and religious spaces. The city also features prominent defense systems (city walls pictured) that were built to protect the fairs.
Belfries of Belgium and France*	An elaborate belfry with a clock	several sites	2005	943bis; ii, iv (cultural)	This site comprises a total of 56 belfries, bell towers of civic buildings instead of churches, that were built between the 11th and 17th centuries in different architectural styles: Romanesque, Gothic, Renaissance, and Baroque. They symbolized the wealth and the influence of the towns. In 1999, 32 belfries in Belgium were originally listed, and in 2005, the site was expanded to include the belfries in France and the belfry in Gembloux in Belgium. Some of the belfries in France include Hôtel de Ville, Loos (pictured); Hôtel de Ville, Aire-sur-la-Lys; Hôtel de Ville, Lille; and Hôtel de Ville, Armentières.
Le Havre, the City Rebuilt by Auguste Perret	View of a city from above, several block of appartment buildings and a church	Normandy	2005	1181; ii, iv (cultural)	The city of Le Havre was severely bombed during World War II and parts of the city were destroyed. A reconstruction took place between 1945 and 1964 by a team of architects under Auguste Perret. The reconstruction is significant because it both preserves the historical layout of the city and its extant buildings, while introducing novel ideas of urban planning with a modular grid and the use of concrete.
Bordeaux, Port of the Moon	Classicist palaces along the river front	Nouvelle-Aquitaine	2007	1256; ii, iv (cultural)	Port of the Moon is the port along the Garonne river in Bordeaux. It started as a Roman town and rose to prominence in the 12th century with the trade links to England and the Low Countries. During the Age of Enlightenment, the city experienced a period of prosperity that resulted in a construction of numerous classical and neoclassical buildings. The urban ensemble exhibits exceptional architectural coherence.
Lagoons of New Caledonia: Reef Diversity and Associated Ecosystems	A photo of a coral island from space	New Caledonia	2008	1115; vii, ix, x (natural)	The site comprises six marine clusters in the South Pacific waters of New Caledonia. They represent one of the three most extensive coral reefs in the world and have the world's most diverse reef structures. In addition to coral reefs, there are mangrove forests and seagrass meadows. They are home to diverse fish communities, including large predators, as well as turtles and dugongs. A satellite image of Ouvéa is pictured.
Fortifications of Vauban	A fortification on the slope of a hill	various	2008	1283; i, ii, iv (cultural)	This site comprises 12 fortresses designed by Marquis of Vauban, the military engineer of King Louis XIV. The fortifications, located on the French borders, represent the peak of bastioned fortifications, characteristic of western military architecture. Vauban's ideas were highly influential in Europe and beyond, including in the Americas, in the Ottoman Empire and in the Russian Empire. The Citadel of Besançon is pictured.
Episcopal City of Albi	A medieval city with an old bridge in front and a Gothic cathedral in the background	Occitania	2010	1337; iv, v (cultural)	Albi was one of the strongholds of the Cathars, a community denounced as a heretic sect by the Roman Catholic Church and suppressed in the early 13th century during the Albigensian Crusade. The city preserves the old bridge from the 10th to 11th centuries while major construction projects took place under the Catholic Church that transformed it to project its religious power. Important buildings in the Southern French Gothic style include the Albi Cathedral and the Episcopal fortress-palace.
The Pitons, Cirques and Remparts of Réunion Island	Tropical island with a volcanic mountain in the background	Réunion	2010	1317; vii, x (natural)	This property covers around 40% of the island of Réunion in the Indian Ocean. The island is dominated by two volcanic peaks, the dormant Piton des Neiges (pictured) and the highly active Piton de la Fournaise. Volcanic activity has created landforms such as cirques, massive natural amphitheatres, and remparts, steep rock walls. The island is rich in endemic plant species and serves as the last refuge for endangered species of the Mascarene Islands.
The Causses and the Cévennes, Mediterranean agro-pastoral Cultural Landscape	Hilly landscape with forests and some traditional houses	Occitania	2011	1153rev; iii, v (cultural)	The cultural landscape (Causse Méjean in the Cévennes National Park pictured) is a living example of a Mediterranean agro-pastoral society. Communities practice sedentary pastoralism, as well as silvo-pastoralism and transhumance, and have a local breed of sheep. The landscape has been shaped over at least three millennia, but especially since the 12th century, by a pattern of farms, villages, water management systems, and drovers' roads (drailles).
Prehistoric pile dwellings around the Alps*	A historical photograph of people inspecting a prehistoric wooden canoe	Bourgogne-Franche-Comté, Auvergne-Rhône-Alpes	2011	1363; iv, v (cultural)	This site comprises 111 archaeological sites in six countries around the Alps that date from the Neolithic to the Bronze Age Europe, from roughly 5000 to 500 BCE. Societies built settlements on the banks of rivers, lakes, and wetlands, and the waterlogged environment helped to preserve the wooden material, including parts of houses, wheels, and dugout canoes. People traded across large distances with flint, gold, amber, and pottery. Eleven sites are listed in France; a historical photograph shows the excavations at Lac de Chalain.
Nord-Pas de Calais Mining Basin	Mining infrastructure above the mine shafts	Hauts-de-France	2012	ii, iv, vi (cultural)	The landscape of the region was transformed by three centuries of coal extraction, from the 1700s to the 20th century. There are over a hundred components in the serial listing, including mine shafts, slag heaps, railroads, villages for workers, communal and administrative buildings, and religious sites. Coal mining was also associated with an influx of international workers, exchange of ideas, and technological innovations. The Courrières mine disaster took place in 1906, illustrating harsh conditions of the workers, as well as their solidarity. Fosse Arenberg in Wallers is pictured.
Decorated Cave of Pont d’Arc, known as Grotte Chauvet-Pont d’Arc, Ardèche	A museum replica of a cave painting depicting horses, bison, and a rhinoceros	Auvergne-Rhône-Alpes	2014	1426; i, iii (cultural)	The cave features paintings by the Aurignacian people, roughly 30,000 to 32,000 years before present. They depict antrophomorphic and animal motifs and demonstrate exceptional level of artistic quality, with the use of shading, anatomical precision, and depiction of movement. Some of the depictions include the mammoth, auroch, cave lion, and rhinoceros. The cave was at one point closed by a rock fall, which helped to preserve it in pristine condition when it was rediscovered in 1994. Today, it is closed to the general public, but scientists are allowed access.
The Climats, terroirs of Burgundy	Vineyard and some buildings on a hill in the background	Bourgogne-Franche-Comté	2015	1425; iii, v (cultural)	The cultural landscape comprises two components, the vineyards around the town of Beaune (pictured), and the city of Dijon. Burgundy wine has been produced here systematically since at least the High Middle Ages, resulting in numerous traditions and techniques. The concept of terroir originates from this area, related to the geographical provinence of wines in view of geological, hydrological, and climate characteristics. This also gave rise to the concept of Appellation d'origine contrôlée (controlled designation of origin). Dijon and Beaune are centres of scientific training, trade, and institutional representation.
Champagne Hillsides, Houses and Cellars	Street with buildings where major Champagne producers are located	Grand Est	2015	1465; iii, iv, vi (cultural)	This site comprises historic vineyards, production sites, and distribution centres for Champagne, the original type of sparkling wine developed here since the early 17th century. Since the 18th century, Champagne has been exported worldwide and the production started on an industrial scale in the 19th century. The production, based on secondary fermentation in the bottle, required numerous cellars. They were dug in chalk hills, creating vast underground networks. The Avenue de Champagne in Épernay, where major houses have their showrooms, is pictured.
The Architectural Work of Le Corbusier, an Outstanding Contribution to the Modern Movement*	A modernist building with columns supporting the first floor	several sites	2016	1321; i, ii, vi (cultural)	This transnational site (shared with Argentina, Belgium, Germany, Japan, Switzerland, and India) encompasses 17 works of Franco-Swiss architect Le Corbusier. Le Corbusier was an important representative of the 20th-century Modernist movement, which introduced new architectural techniques to meet the needs of the changing society. Ten buildings are listed in France, including Villa Savoye (pictured) in Poissy.
Taputapuātea	A stone sculpture on a stone platform	French Polynesia	2017	1529; iii, iv, vi (cultural)	The marae complex of Taputapuatea on the Raʻiātea island was a political, ceremonial and funerary centre of the Maohi culture and were acting as the meeting point between the living and the ancestors. Marae are sacred spaces found across Polynesia in the Society Islands they have rectangular paved courtyards with a platform on one side. They were constructed between the 14th and 18th centuries. They demonstrate political power, social organization, and cultural traditions.
Chaîne des Puys – Limagne fault tectonic arena	Landscape with extinct volcanoes	Auvergne-Rhône-Alpes	2018	1434rev; viii (natural)	The area is important from a geological perspective as an example of continental break-up, or rifting. It is a part of the European Cenozoic Rift System and was created in the aftermath of the formation of the Alps, 35 million years ago. The property comprises the chain of volcanoes, Chaîne des Puys (pictured), and an inverted relief at Montagne de la Serre. The area has been important in the studies of geological processes since the 18th century.
French Austral Lands and Seas	Penguins on a beach and a cruise boat in the background	French Southern and Antarctic Lands	2019	1603bis; vii, ix, x (natural)	This serial site comprises three subantarctic archipelagos: Crozet Islands (pictured), Kerguelen Islands, and Saint Paul and Amsterdam Islands. They have large continental shelves and are located at the convergence of three ocean fronts. This makes the waters around the islands very productive, which in turn supports high concentrations of marine birds and mammals, including large colonies of king penguin, Indian yellow-nosed albatross, and elephant seal. The site also includes one of the largest marine protected areas in the world.
The Great Spa Towns of Europe*	A spa resort building	Auvergne-Rhône-Alpes	2021	1613; ii, iii (cultural)	This transnational site comprises 11 spa towns in seven European countries where mineral waters were used for healing and therapeutic purposes before the development of industrial medication in the 19th century. The town of Vichy (pictured) is listed in France.
Cordouan Lighthouse	A historic lighthouse building	Nouvelle-Aquitaine	2021	1625; i, iv (cultural)	The lighthouse, located on an islet in the Gironde estuary, was constructed in the early 17th century and reconstructed at the end of the 18th century to reach the current height of 67 m (220 ft). The Renaissance building by Louis de Foix was inspired by Roman mausolea while the enlargement under Joseph Teulère was done in the Neoclassical style. The lighthouse is a prominent example of the era when beacons were important as territorial markers and as instruments of safety. It remains in use today.
Nice, Winter Resort Town of the Riviera	A hotel Le Negresco and palm trees along the promenade	Provence-Alpes-Côte d'Azur	2021	1635; ii (cultural)	Since the mid-18th century, the mild winter climate in Nice has been attracting aristocratic and wealthy tourists, especially British, to spend the winters there. At that point, the city was still under the Kingdom of Sardinia. When it ultimately became a part of France in 1860 and was connected to the rail network, tourists from different countries started arriving. This led to new developments to support tourism, with a mixture of styles and influences, and construction of hotels, residences, promenades, parks, and gardens. After World War II, Nice started receiving more tourists in summer than in winter.
Ancient and Primeval Beech Forests of the Carpathians and Other Regions of Europe*	Beech forest	Provence-Alpes-Côte d'Azur, Grand Est, Occitania	2021	1133quinquies; ix (natural)	This site comprises 93 component parts in 18 countries, demonstrating the postglacial expansion process of such forests and exhibit the most complete and comprehensive ecological patterns and processes of pure and mixed stands of European beech across a variety of environmental conditions. The site was originally listed in 2007 and expanded four times. Three forests in France, Chaudun, Ventron, and Massane (pictured), were added in 2021.
Funerary and memory sites of the First World War (Western Front)*	Tombstones on a military cemetery	Hauts-de-France, Grand Est, Île-de-France	2023	1567rev; iii, iv, vi (cultural)	World War I was a new, industrialized kind of war that left over two million dead on the Western Front, including conscripted soldiers, civilians, and labourers. For the first time in history, and what has since become an international standard, every individual who died in combat was (in principle) buried and acknowledged as a person, either in an individual grave or in an ossuary for unidentified soldiers. All warring parties adhered to these principles and each of them designed cemeteries and memorials for their fallen. This serial property comprises 139 funerary and memorial sites both in France and Belgium. Étaples Military Cemetery is pictured.
The Maison Carrée of Nîmes	A Roman temple with several columns, a night photograph	Occitania	2023	1569rev; iv (cultural)	The Maison Carrée is one of the best preserved examples of a Roman temple. It dates to the period of Augustus, in the 1st century CE, and was dedicated to the Roman imperial cult. It symbolizes the transition from the Roman Republic to an Empire, as well as the values and stability brought by the Pax Romana.
Volcanoes and Forests of Mount Pelée and the Pitons of Northern Martinique	Village on the coast and a volcano in the background	Martinique	2023	1657; viii, x (natural)	Mount Pelée (pictured) and the Carbet Mountains are parts of the Lesser Antilles Volcanic Arc. The 1902 eruption of Mount Pelée, which resulted in 28,000 deaths, became the reference point for a newly described type of volcanic eruption, the Peléan type. The area is also significant due to its rich biodiversity, with numerous endemic animal and plant species. Some of the species include the Martinique volcano frog, Martinique lancehead, and Martinique oriole.
Te Henua Enata – The Marquesas Islands	Stone statues in a tropical forest setting	French Polynesia	2024	1707; iii, vi, vii, ix, x (mixed)	Polynesians first arrived in the Marquesas around the 10th century and their civilization was developing in relative isolation until the arrival of the Europeans and annexation of the islands by the French in 1842. This resulted in a demographic collapse and cultural assimilation. Nevertheless, numerous myths and legends remain alive today. There are archaeological sites including stone platforms, statues (pictured), and petroglyph engravings. From the natural point of view, the islands are a biodiversity hotspot, home to rare and diverse flora, endemic marine species, and one of the most diverse seabird assemblages in the South Pacific.
Megaliths of Carnac and of the shores of Morbihan	An assembly of menhirs	Brittany	2025	1725; i, iv (cultural)	This site comprises four areas with megalithic structures, including menhirs, dolmens, tumuli, and stone rows, that were created by Neolithic cultures from approximately 5000 to 2300 BCE. They demonstrate the cultural complexity of the society that inhabited the region for over two millennia. Several stones feature engravings depicting objects, animals, or abstract forms, which is otherwise rarely documented in similar sites. The stone alignment at Kermario is pictured.
Beaches of the D-Day Landings, Normandy, 1944	A WW2 military bunker with French and US flags	Normandy	2026	1581; vi (cultural)	The Normandy landings of the Allies during World War II took place on 6 June 1944. They disembarked at Utah Beach, Pointe du Hoc, Omaha Beach, Gold Beach, Juno Beach, and Sword Beach. Today, these sites preserve the commemorative sites and cemeteries, as well as remains of the German Atlantic Wall (remains of a bunker at Omaha Beach pictured).
Royal Capetian Fortresses of Languedoc	Castle ruins on the top of a hill	Occitania	2026	1755; iv (cultural)	This site comprises the city of Carcassonne, already listed as a World Heritage Site in 1997, and seven sentinel castles (Peyrepertuse pictured). The castles are a prominent example of the French military architecture of the 13th century and are adapted to difficult geography, such as mountain ridges. During the Albigensian Crusade, these castles served as the strongholds of the Cathars, a religious community denounced as a heretic sect by the Roman Catholic Church.

== Tentative list ==
In addition to sites inscribed on the World Heritage List, member states can maintain a list of tentative sites that they may consider for nomination. Nominations for the World Heritage List are only accepted if the site was previously listed on the tentative list. As of 2026, France recorded 32 sites on its tentative list.

Tentative Sites
Site	Image	Location (region)	Year listed	UNESCO criteria	Description
Basilica of Saint-Denis	A large medieval church with one bell tower	Île-de-France	1996	i, ii, iv (cultural)	The cathedral was constructed in the 12th century under Abbot Suger on the site of churches from the previous periods. It served as the royal necropolis, the resting place of the Kings of France from the 13th century to the French Revolution. In the history of architecture, the church is important in pioneering the concepts of Gothic architecture.
Rouen : half-timbered urban complex, Rouen Cathedral, Saint-Ouen Abbey, Church of Saint-Maclou	Rouen skyline with prominent churches	Normandy	1996	(cultural)	Rouen is notable for its medieval half-timbered houses and three churches. The cathedral with three spires is pictured on the right and Saint-Ouen Abbey in the background in the centre.
Vaux-le-Vicomte	A Baroque château with a dome in the central part	Île-de-France	1996	i, ii, iv (cultural)	The château was constructed in the mid-17th century for Nicolas Fouquet, Superintendent of Finances of King Louis XIV. The estate comprises several gardens and represents a masterpiece of French art. The playwright Molière composed plays for fêtes that took place at the château. However, Fouquet soon fell out of favour with the King and was arrested. This contributed to the estate seeing little modification in the 17th and 18th centuries.
The fortified towns of the Netherlands in northwestern Europe*		Hauts-de-France, Grand Est	1996	(cultural)	This nomination comprises fortified towns in northern France, Belgium, and southern Netherlands. Located on a flat relief, towns had to continuously invest into fortifications because of frequent military conflicts and shifting borders in the region.
Montagne Sainte-Victoire and Cézanne Sites	A mountain with surrounding forest	Provence-Alpes-Côte d'Azur	1996	(mixed)	Montagne Sainte-Victoire is a limestone mountain that reaches 1,000 m (3,300 ft) in height. From the natural perspective, it is notable due to its rich plant diversity and bird fauna, as well as its paleontological heritage. From the cultural perspective, the mountain featured in a series of paintings by the French painter Paul Cézanne who lived in the area. Several of sites, associated with him, have been preserved.
Stalactite Caves in Southern France		Occitania	2000	vii, viii, ix (natural)	This nomination comprises 19 caves and cave systems that are notable for their speleothems.
Vanoise National Park*	A high mountain partially covered by snow	Auvergne-Rhône-Alpes	2000	(mixed)	The national park in the Vanoise Massif (Grande Casse, its tallest mountain, pictured) is notable for its natural and cultural heritage. The nomination also proposes the inclusion of the contiguous Gran Paradiso National Park in Italy.
Mont Blanc Massif*	A look at the mountain range with glaciers from above	Auvergne-Rhône-Alpes	2000	(mixed)	Mont Blanc, with a height of 4,810 m (15,780 ft), is the highest peak of the Alps. The massif has several glaciers and is an important habitat for mountain flora and fauna. The nomination is shared with Italy and expected to be joined by Switzerland.
Camargue	Flamingos in a pond	Provence-Alpes-Côte d'Azur	1996	vii, x (natural)	Camargue is a region in the Rhône delta. The landscape is constantly evolving due to the sediments that the river brings from the Alps. Part of the region is protected as Parc naturel régional de Camargue. Camargue is an important wetland, protected as a Ramsar site, and home to numerous birds, including the greater flamingo (pictured) that nest here.
Strait of Bonifacio	Coast with cliffs and rock formations	Corsica	2002	vii, viii, ix, x (natural)	The strait between the islands of Corsica and Sardinia is notable for its limestone cliffs (pictured), scree, and sea caves. The Lavezzi archipelago is located in the strait.
Écrins National Park	Mountain lake and snow-covered mountains in the background	Provence-Alpes-Côte d'Azur	2002	(mixed)	The national park is located in the Alps and has peaks reaching above 4,000 m (13,000 ft). From a geological point of view, the Massif des Écrins is interesting, because it demonstrates different rock types associated with the formation of the Alps. The area has different vegetation ensembles, ranging from sub-Mediterranean to Alpine flora. It is also home to several animal species, including the rock ptarmigan, Eurasian pygmy owl, Alpine ibex, and chamois. The mountains are also a cultural landscape, shaped by hedges, plots, and mountain terraces. Vernacular architecture demonstrates the adaptation of the locals to the mountain environment.
Port-Cros National Park	Coast with hills covered by trees	Provence-Alpes-Côte d'Azur	2002	vii, x (natural)	The national park comprises the island of Port-Cros, nearby islets, and surrounding sea.
Salt marshes of Guérande	Salt pans with piles of salt	Loire-Atlantique	2002	(mixed)	Salt evaporation ponds around Guérande were created to produce salt from sea water and have been in use for more than a millennium. They are also an important habitat for extremophile organisms.
The Mediterranean shore of the Pyrenees	Coastal town and vineyards on the hills in the background	Occitania	2002	(mixed)	The coast was settled already in the Classical antiquity and saw an exchange of cultures through history. The area, characterized by a steep rocky coast, is rich in terrestrial and marine biodiversity. Among features of the cultural landscape are the coastal vineyards of Banyuls-sur-Mer (pictured). The light and colours of the region also inspired several artists of the 20th century.
Marseille Rade	A view from the coast to the sea, with islets and boats	Provence-Alpes-Côte d'Azur	2002	ii, iv, v, vi (cultural)	The Rade (harbour) of Marseille has several historical buildings, including the Notre-Dame de la Garde church and the Abbey of St Victor, buildings associated with the ports, and promenades. The nomination also considers districts behind the waterfront and several islands in the bay.
The ancient cities of Narbonnaise and their territory: Nîmes, Arles, Glanum, aqueducts, Via Domitia	Roman mausoleum and an arch	Provence-Alpes-Côte d'Azur, Languedoc-Roussillon	2002	ii, ii, iv, v (cultural)	This nomination comprises important sites of Gallia Narbonensis under the Roman Empire. The cities were major junctions on the Via Domitia. There are several monuments from Roman times, as well as remains of aqueducts. The Mausoleum of Glanum and the Arch are pictured.
Ligne de Cerdagne	Suspension railway bridge crossing a gorge, with a train on the track	Occitania	2002	vi (cultural)	The narrow-gauge railway, nicknamed the Yellow Train, was built in the early 20th century to connect the communities of the French Pyrenees. It is an electric line that is supported by a set of hydroelectric plants. A suspension bridge near Pont Gisclard is pictured.
National Office for Aerospace Studies and Research, Meudon	A hangar with a wind tunnel from outside	Île-de-France	2002	(cultural)	The research centre (ONERA) in Meudon played an important role in the development of French aeronautics. The most interesting building in the complex is a large wind tunnel (pictured), constructed in the early 1930s and seen as a major achievement of French interwar engineering. There are also several buildings from the late 19th century.
Hangar Y	A historical hangar building with glass windows	Île-de-France	2002	(cultural)	Hangar Y is located at the Chalais-Meudon research centre, which was founded in 1877 by the French military engineer Charles Renard to develop airships for military use. The hangar is 70 m (230 ft) long and 26 m (85 ft) tall.
Menier Chocolate Factory	A historic factory building with a decorated facade, with water for a mill underneath	Île-de-France	2002	(cultural)	The chocolate factory was founded in the early 19th century by Antoine Brutus Menier whose family owned large cocoa plantations in Nicaragua. The factory complex represents important industrial heritage. Particularly interesting is the building (pictured) constructed by the architect Jules Saulnier between 1869 and 1972. The building combines the use of a metal frame with brick filling.
Sarlat-la-Canéda	A view at an historic town from above	Nouvelle-Aquitaine	2002	v, vi (cultural)	Sarlat-la-Canéda was one of the first French cities protected in the 1960s under a pilot experiment to protect the historical center while preventing the departure of the inhabitants. There are 77 protected monuments in the city. Sarlat was also the birthplace of the Renaissance writer Étienne de La Boétie.
Rochefort Arsenal and Fortifications on the Charente Estuary	A long military building	Nouvelle-Aquitaine	2002	(cultural)	The Arsenal de Rochefort was established in 1666 under Louis XIV on the advice of Jean-Baptiste Colbert. It served as a French naval base and a dockyard. It is located 24 km (15 mi) from the sea, along the Charente river, which gave it a defensive advantage. A prominent building in the complex is the Corderie Royale (pictured), used for the manufacturing of rope. The city of Rochefort was built in the same period and followed a grid plan. The estuary of the Charente has several fortifications for the defense of the arsenal.
Royal and Imperial Metz, power issues, stylistic confrontations and urban identity	A view at the city of Metz from above, with the prominent cathedral	Grand Est	2014	i, ii, iv (cultural)	The city of Metz changed hands between France and Germany several times, which is reflected on the urban plan and monuments from different periods. They include the Gothic Metz Cathedral, the Protestant Temple Neuf, the Opera house, and the Metz-Ville station.
Mediterranean Alps*	Mountain scenery	Provence-Alpes-Côte d'Azur	2017	viii (natural)	This transnational nomination, shared with Italy and Monaco, covers parts of the Maritime Alps and the Ligurian Alps. This section of the Alps is interesting from a geological perspective as it provides an example of an uneroded range which formed 30 million years ago during the Alpine orogeny upon rocks dating to the Variscan orogeny 400 million years ago. In less than 70 km (43 mi), the mountains drop from 3,300 m (10,800 ft) (Monte Argentera) to the seabed of 2,500 m (8,200 ft) in the Mediterranean basin.
Charolais-Brionnais, cultural landscape of cattle farming	A white cow with a calf	Bourgogne-Franche-Comté	2018	iii, v (cultural)	Since the 17th century, the farmers in the Charolais-Brionnais region have specialized in breeding of the Charolais cattle (a cow and a calf pictured), which is raised for meat. The cultural landscape is shaped by pastures, old farmhouses, markets, and fairs. Cattle-breeding traditions are transferred from one generation to another.
Domaine de Fontainebleau: Palace, Gardens, Park, and Forest	Forest with some trees on a rocky hill	Île-de-France	2020	ii, iv, vi (cultural)	This is a proposed extension to the Palace of Fontainebleau, already listed as a World Heritage Site in 1981. The Forest of Fontainebleau (pictured) was a hunting place for the kings for eight centuries. In the 19th century, it inspired the painters of the Barbizon School, romantic writers, scientists, and hikers.
The material testimonies of the construction of the State of the Pyrenees: the Co-Principality of Andorra (France)*	A medieval castle on the top of a hill	Occitania	2021	iii, iv (cultural)	This transnational nomination comprises twelve monuments related to the history of the country of Andorra, which was created in the 13th century as a result of a balance of civil and ecclesiastical powers. Since then, it has been ruled by two co-princes. Ten monuments, including Romanesque churches, are considered in Andorra, the castle of Foix (pictured) in France, and the Seu d'Urgell Cathedral in Spain.
Lérins Abbey	A monastery with a church and surrounding walls, with some palm trees	Provence-Alpes-Côte d'Azur	2022	v, vi (cultural)	Monks had settled on the Île Saint-Honorat of the Lérins Islands off the coast of Cannes by the 5th century. This early monastic community produced several important works of literature. In the 10th century, the monastery started following the Benedictine order. In medieval times, numerous defensive constructions were built to resist attacks from the sea. After the dissolution of the monastery in 1788, the Cistercians arrived on the island in the 19th century and reestablished it. They also installed a printing press.
The Pic du Midi de Bigorre observatory, pioneer in high mountains	Observatories located on a high mountain peak	Occitania	2022	ii, iii, iv (cultural)	The observatory, located at an elevation of 2,876 m (9,436 ft), was founded in 1878. It was originally intended for high-altitude meteorological observations but quickly became an astronomical observatory as well, due to the favourable stable atmospheric conditions. Today, it is a dark-sky preserve, with strict regulations of artificial light. Research conducted at the observatory includes studies of cosmic rays and infrared astronomy.
Extension to the existing World Heritage Property “Ancient and Primeval Beech Forests of the Carpathians and Other Regions of Europe” (France)*	Landscape with forests and hills	Occitania, Provence-Alpes-Côte d'Azur	2024	ix (natural)	The World Heritage Site currently has 93 components in 18 countries, including three areas in France. The nomination considers three additional protected areas, in Sainte-Baume (pictured), Saint-Pé-de-Bigorre, and Aigoual - La Brèze.
Parish closes of Finistère	Old church with surrounding stone structures	Brittany	2024	ii, iii (cultural)	Parish closes are a characteristic feature of parish churches in Brittany. They comprise a walled churchyard, sometimes with a calvary, an ossuary or a charnel house. They mostly date to the period between the 15th and 18th centuries. The changing styles reflect the historical trends, associated with the onset of trans-Atlantic trade or religious upheavals. The Guimiliau Parish close is pictured.

== See also ==
- List of Intangible Cultural Heritage elements in France
- Tourism in France
