= Gulf of Porto =

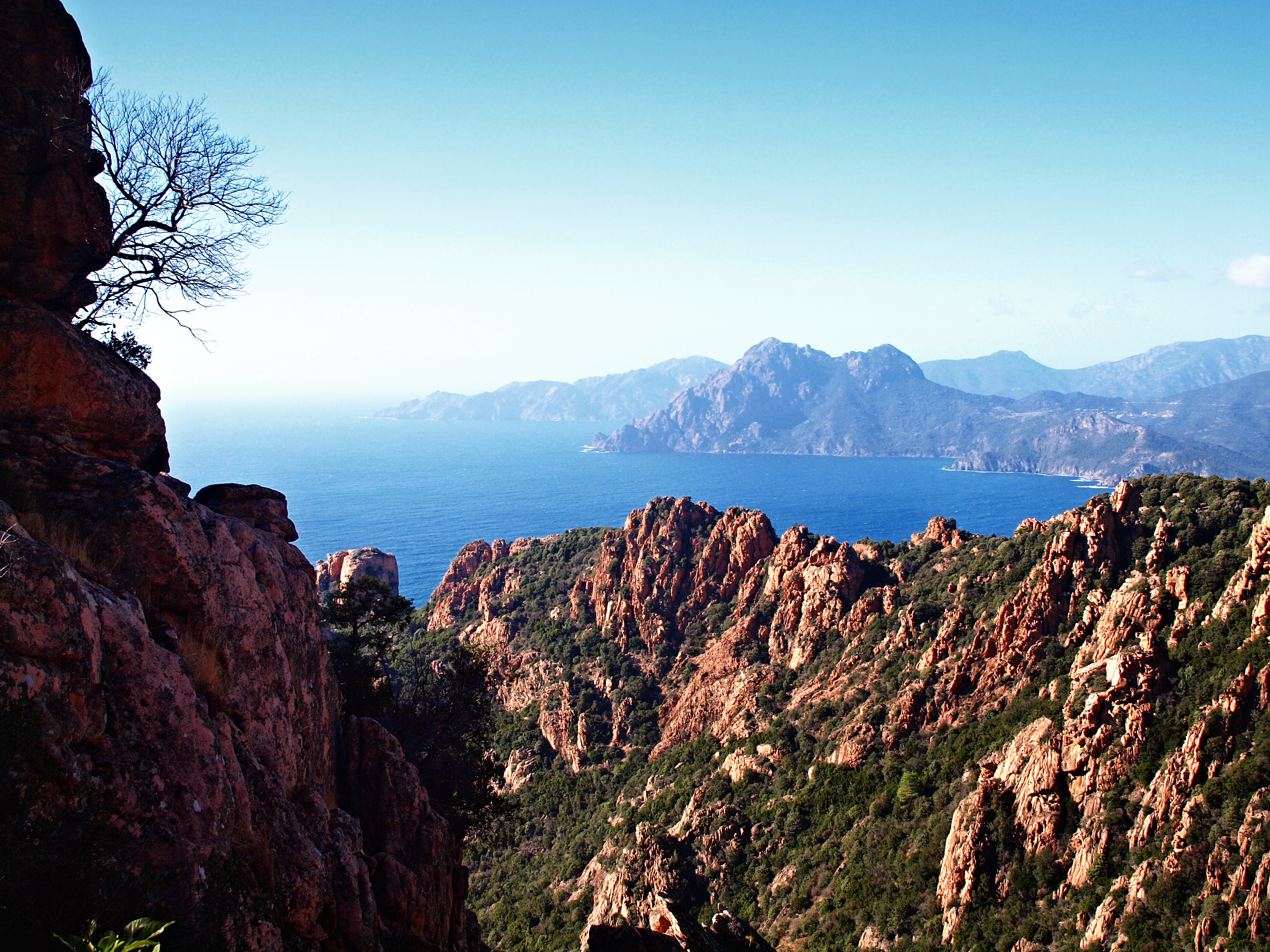
- View of the gulf from the Calanques de Piana

- Location within Corsica
- Location: Corse-du-Sud, Corsica, France
- Coordinates: 42°19′30.698″N 8°37′43″E
- Type: Gulf
- Primary inflows: Porto River
- Ocean/sea sources: Mediterranean Sea, Atlantic Ocean
- Basin countries: France
- Designation: Regional Natural Park of Corsica
- Max. length: 7 mi (11 km)
- Max. width: 5 mi (8.0 km)

Gulf of Porto
UNESCO World Heritage Site
- Interactive map of Gulf of Porto
- Official name: Gulf of Porto: Calanche of Piana, Gulf of Girolata, Scandola Reserve
- Location: Corsica, France
- Criteria: Natural: (vii), (viii), (x)
- Reference: 258
- Inscription: 1983 (7th Session)

The Gulf of Porto is a gulf of the Mediterranean Sea located on the western façade of the island of Corsica, France, well known for its dramatic coloration and rugged cliffs. The gulf is located within the department of Corse-du-Sud. The gulf and surrounding coast is part of the Regional Natural Park of Corsica. In 1983 the gulf was designated as a UNESCO World Heritage Site, encompassing the Calanques de Piana, Gulf of Girolata, and Scandola Nature Reserve, due to its outstanding scenery, rich avian and marine life, and maquis shrubland.

== Geography and Biodiversity ==
The Gulf of Porto is bounded by five communes. From the north coast of the gulf and proceeding clockwise around the coast to the south, they are Osani, Partinello, Serriera, Ota, and Piana. The head of the gulf is in Ota, where the Porto River flows into the sea. The coastline of the Gulf of Porto is famous for its orange-red cliffs and headlands that reach up to 900 m high. The sheer cliff faces are interrupted by many grottoes and the gulf itself contains numerous sea stacks, islets, and coves.

The coastal and marine biodiversity along the Gulf of Porto is very rich. The littoral zone is dominated by sea lavender, and all 450 species of marine algae known in the Mediterranean have been recorded along the Gulf. These include Halimeda species and other species not observed in other areas of France. Because of the clarity of the water in the region, the algae can grow as deep as 35 meters. The Scandola Nature Reserve preserves many terrestrial species in the area. Along with the algae, precious coral is found in the shallow areas of the gulf. In addition, the strong currents allow for large number of fish to congregate.

== History ==
The Porto-Piana region has historically been sparsely populated as a result of its rugged terrain and turbulent history. A series of recurring plagues from the mid 15th to late 16th centuries, followed by food shortages and famines from the 16th to 18th centuries decimated the area's population. Toward the end of the Middle Ages, the gulf area was under the lordship of the Leca, one of the Cinarchesi noble houses. At the end of the 15th century, Count Giovan Paolo di Leca plunged the region into conflict.

During the second half of the 16th century, Barbary corsairs regularly assaulted the Corsican coast, prompting the construction of a number of coastal defenses collectively referred to as the Genoese towers in Corsica. Three such towers were located on the coast of the Gulf of Porto: Torra di l'Isula di Gargali, on the eponymous islet off the west coast near Osani, Torra di Portu, at the head of the gulf in Ota, and Torra di Turghju, on the gulf's south coast in Piana.

Despite these fortifications, raiding by the corsairs eventually eliminated entire villages, including Paomia and Revinda. At the end of the 16th century, the coastal lowlands were described as being completely abandoned: "So it is with Sia, the pit of Salogna, ruined, or that of Paomia, completely deserted in 1584." By the start of the 17th century, it was clear that Corsica was not defensible. Residents of the mountain villages who owned land on the coast lobbied for the construction of a larger number of fortifications, resulting in the reconstruction of a tower in Sagone, as well as six other new towers: Omigna, Cargèse, Orchinu, Cavi Rossi, Gargalo and Imbuto. These six towers were built between 1605 and 1611 under the direction of the architect Anton Giovanni Sarola. During this time, Genoan authorities developed a policy of concessions, leading in particular to the establishment in Cargèse of a Greek colony which caused tension with the surrounding population.

In his travel account Une excursion en Corse, published in 1891, Prince Roland Bonaparte described the area as one of Corsica's most beautiful natural places. Since 1983, the Gulf of Porto and its surrounding features have been collectively designated as a UNESCO World Heritage Site. UNESCO describes the area as "an impressive porphyry massif with tormented shapes."

== Gallery ==
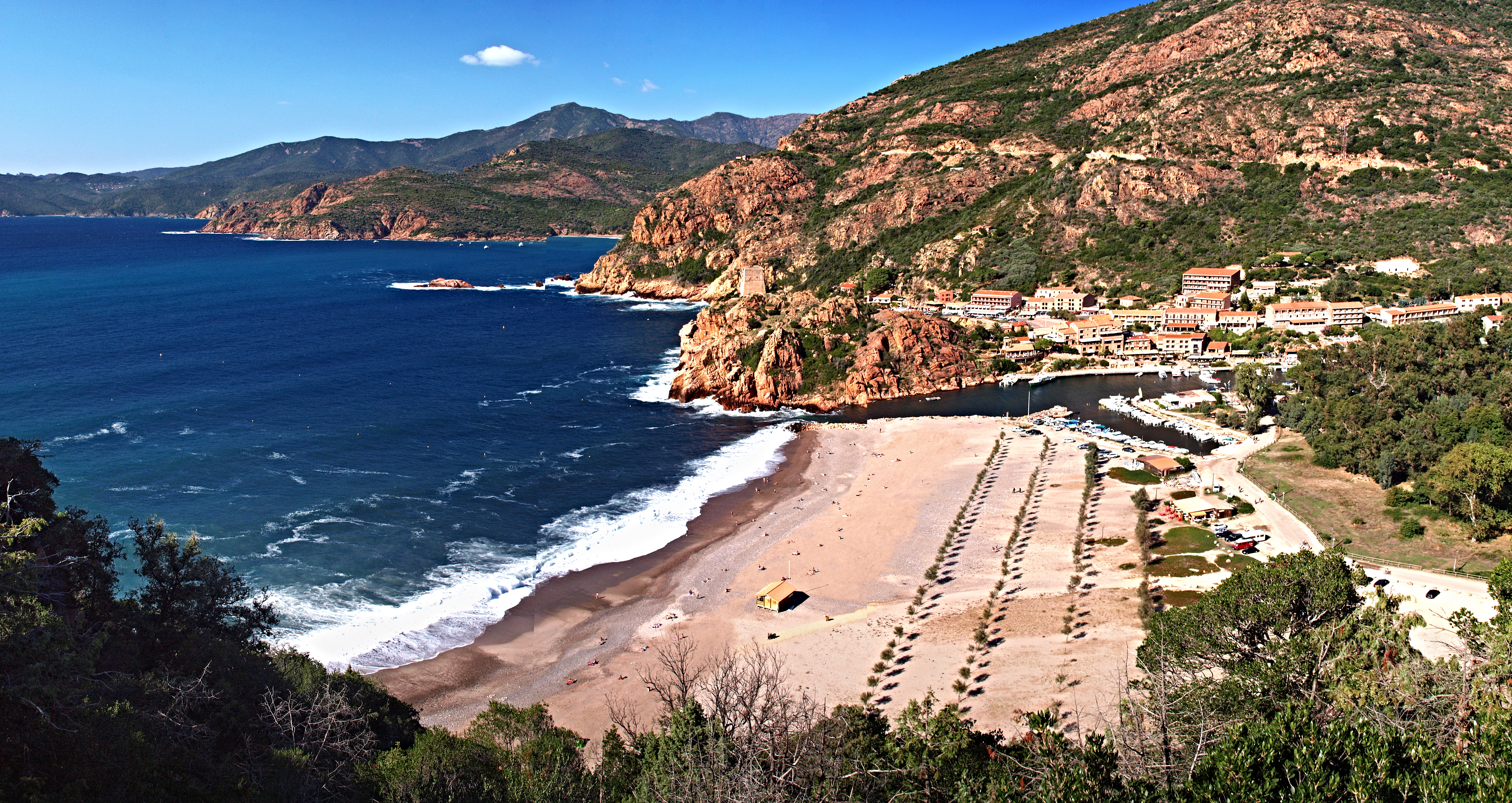
Beach at the head of the gulf

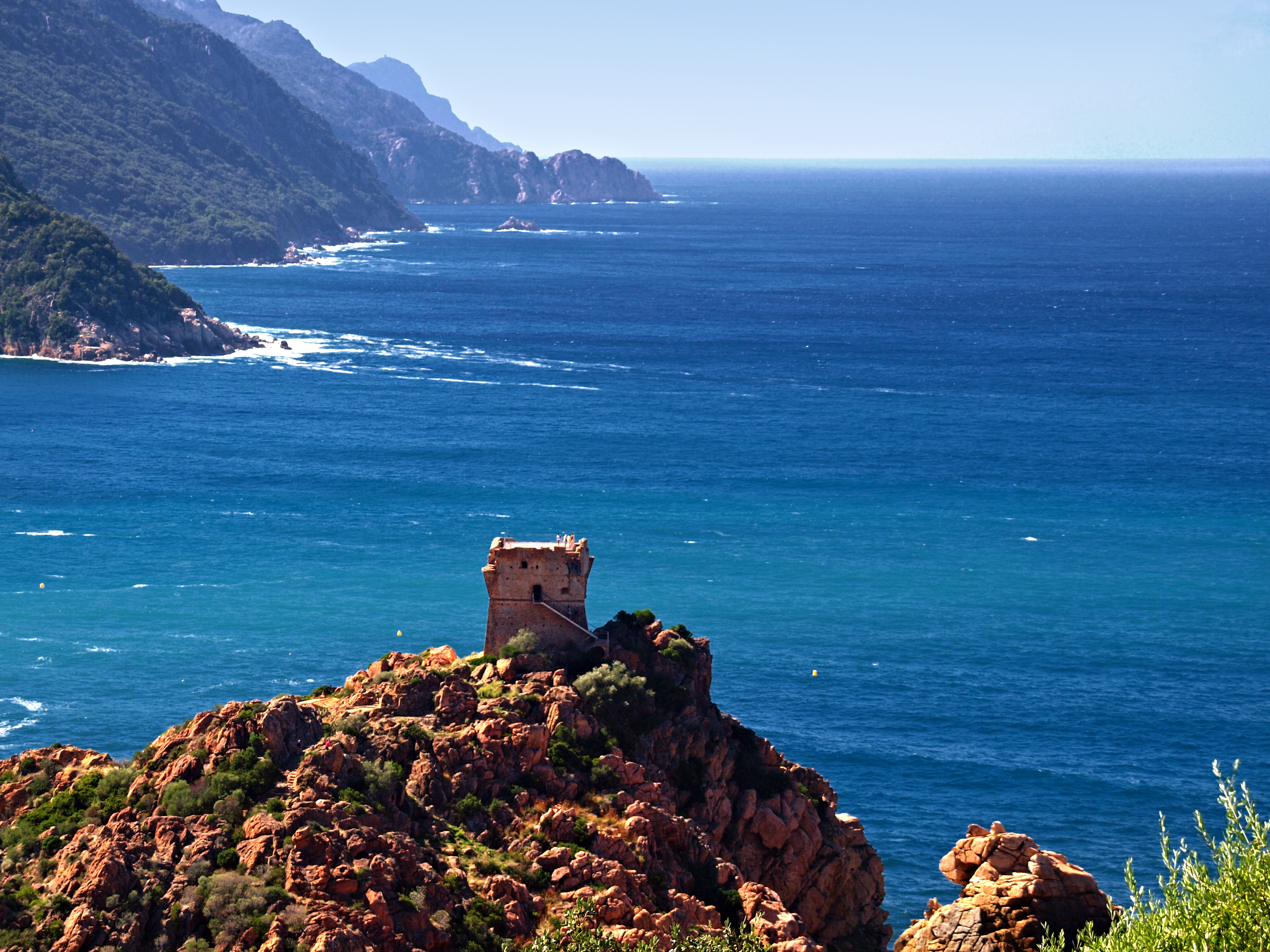
South shore of the gulf showing Genoese tower

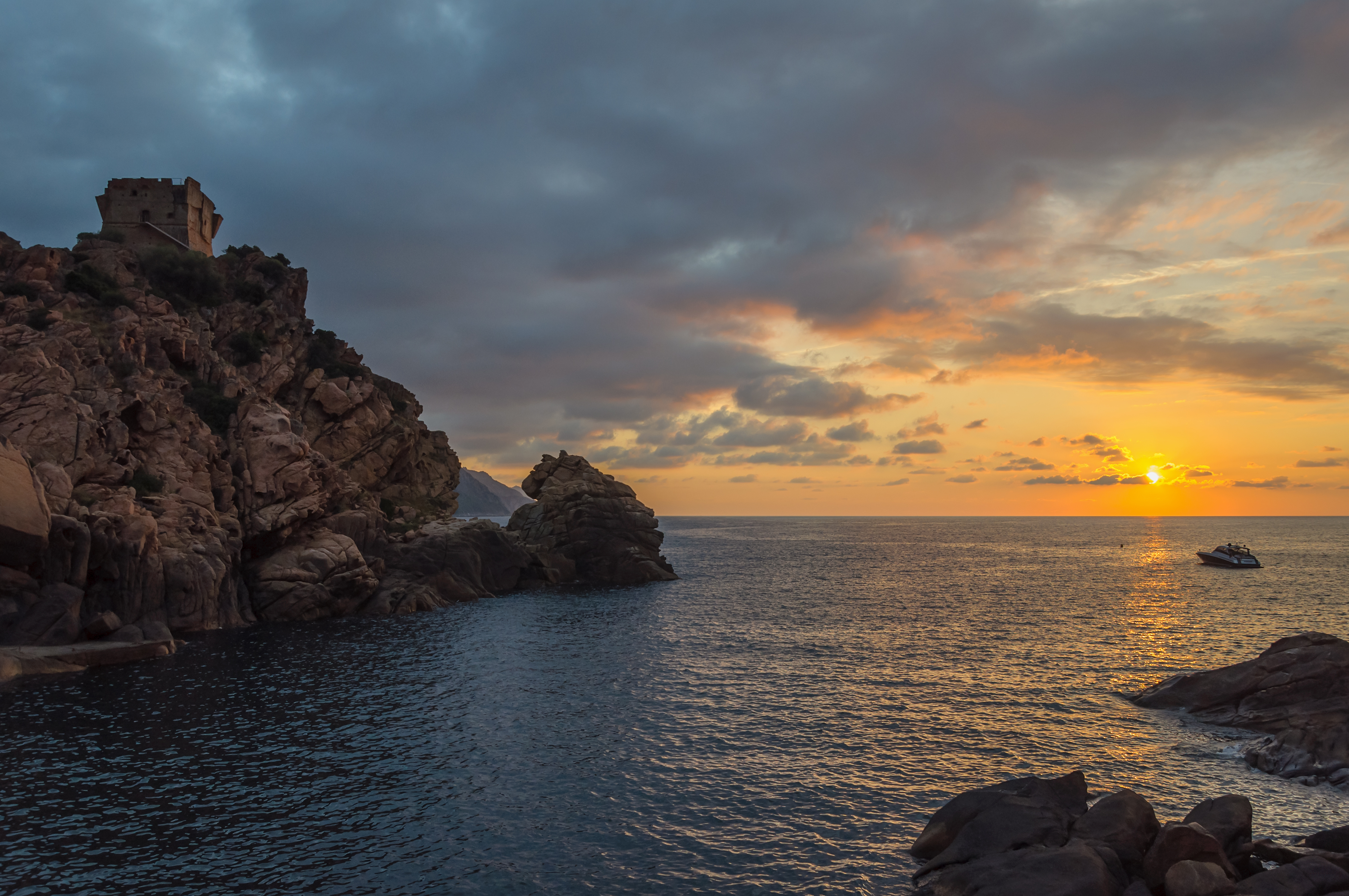
The Genoese tower at sunset

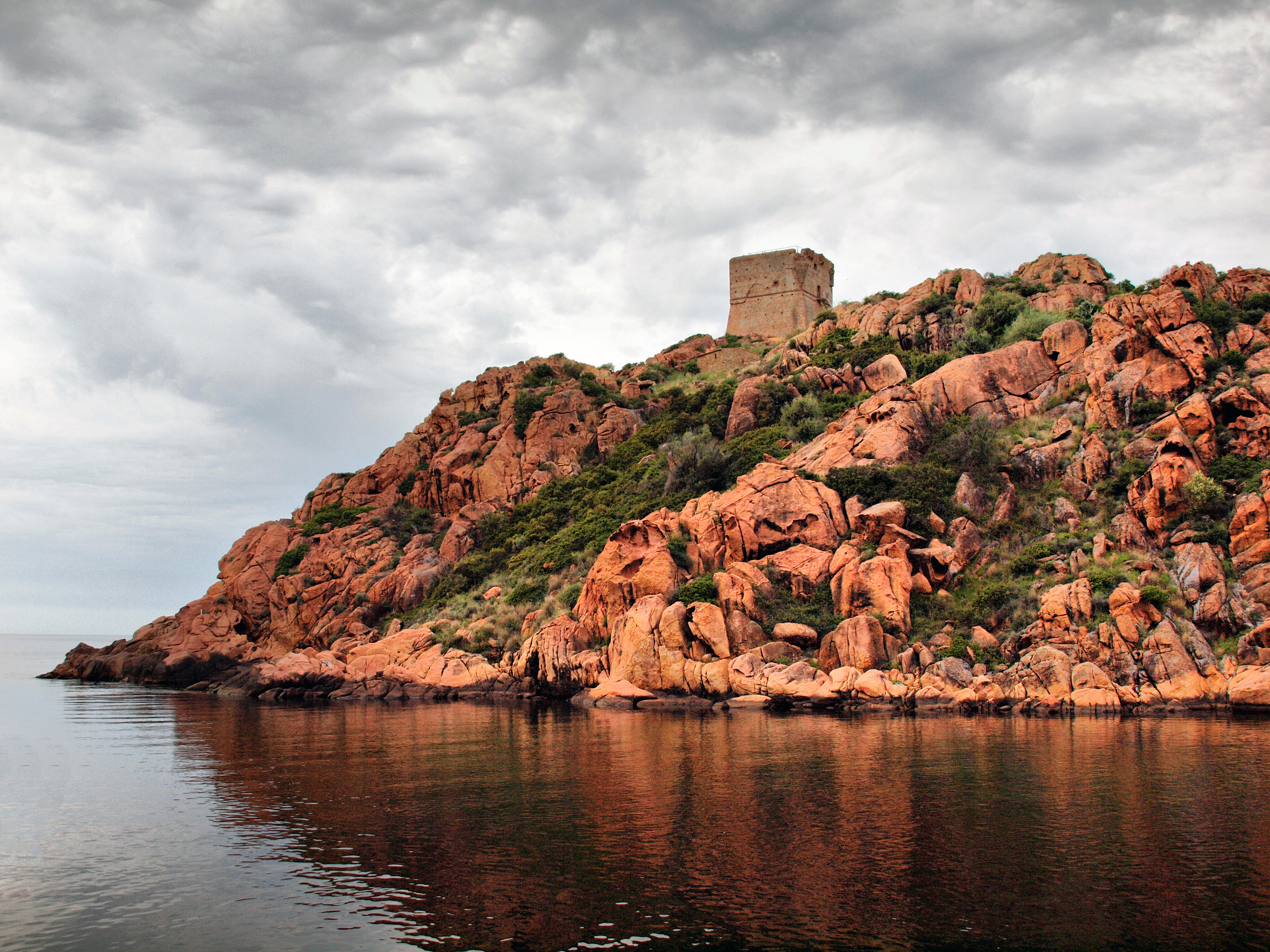
Another angle of the tower

== See also ==
- Geology of Corsica
