= Les Roches Rouges Hotel =

Hotel in Piana, France

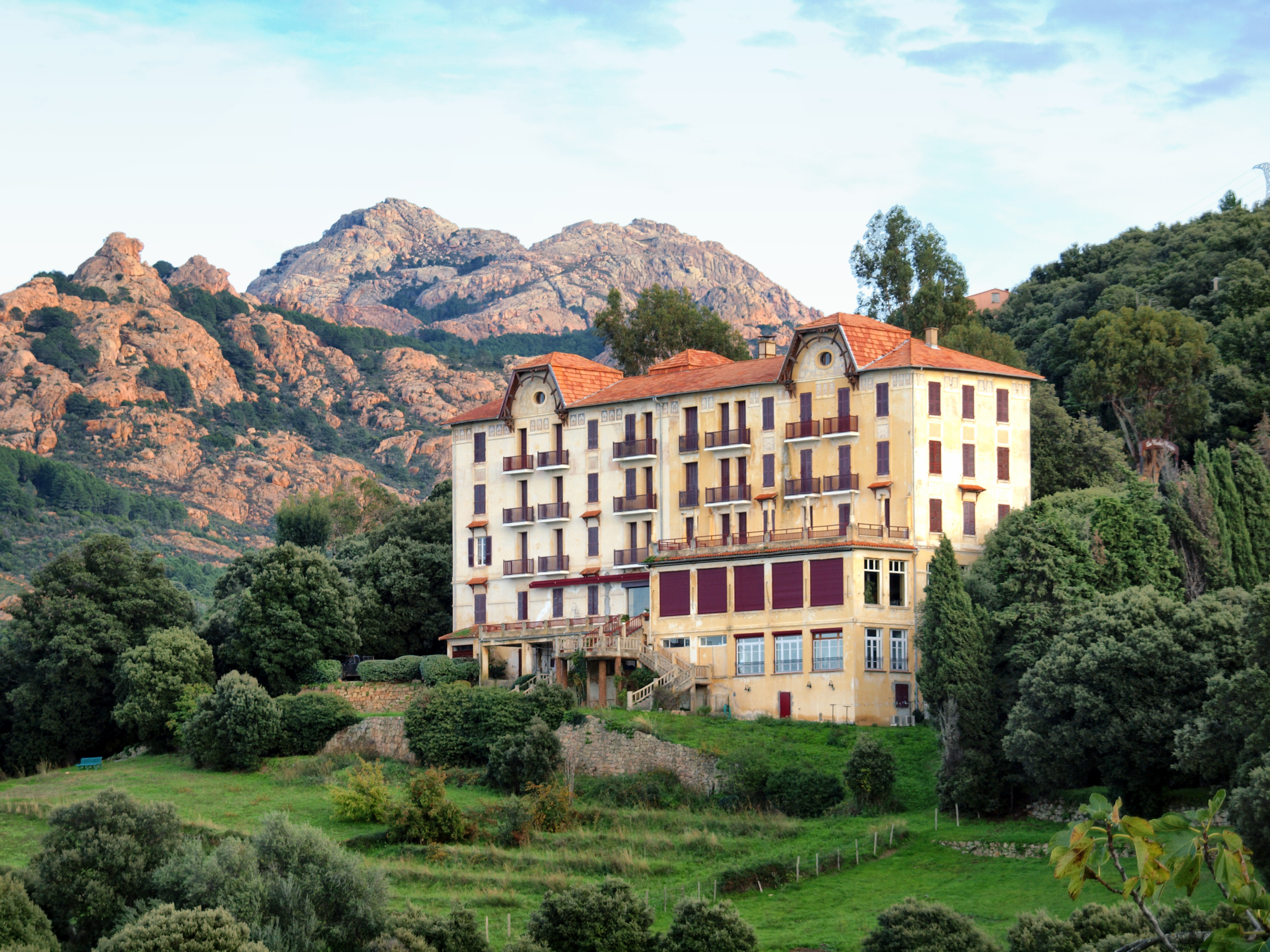
- Interactive map of Les Roches Rouges Hotel
- Location: Piana, France
- Opened: 1912
- No. of rooms: 30
- Owner: Madeleine Dalakupeyan
- Website: https://lesrochesrouges.com

The Les Roches Rouges Hotel (French: Hôtel Les Roches Rouges) opened in 1912 in Piana, Corsica. It was renovated in 1928 and was partially listed as a historic monument in 2019.

== History ==
The Les Roches Rouges Hotel in Piana, near the natural landmarks of the Calanques of Piana in Corse-du-Sud, was built in 1911 for the Société des hôtels corses. The project was carried out as part of a tourism promotion program for Corsica, initiated in the late 19th century and characterized, in particular, by the creation of tourist routes. Following its acquisition by the Société Corsotels, a subsidiary of PLM, the hotel was renovated in 1928, with the addition of a new restaurant room.

The hotel closed in 1965. Madeleine Dalakupeyan, known as Mady Dalakupeyan, a native of Piana born in 1950, initially worked as a housekeeper, then as a hotel manager, and eventually became the owner of a hotel in Porto. She sold it to purchase the Les Roches Rouges Hotel and reopened the establishment in 1986.

A painting by artist Adolphe Cossard, depicting a view of Calvi and its Grand Hotel, decorates the restaurant room.

Les Roches Rouges served as a filming location for Joueuse, a film directed by Caroline Bottaro and released in 2009.

Among its thousands of guests, Les Roches Rouges has welcomed several notable personalities, including Jean d’Ormesson, Carole Bouquet, Muriel Robin, and Étienne Daho.

== Protection ==
The Les Roches Rouges Hotel was partially listed as a historic monument in 2019. Its interior, including the restaurant, dining room, and decorative features, is protected. These elements were executed in 1928 by the Manenti company.

The hotel has been awarded the 20th-Century Heritage label.
