= Porto (river) =

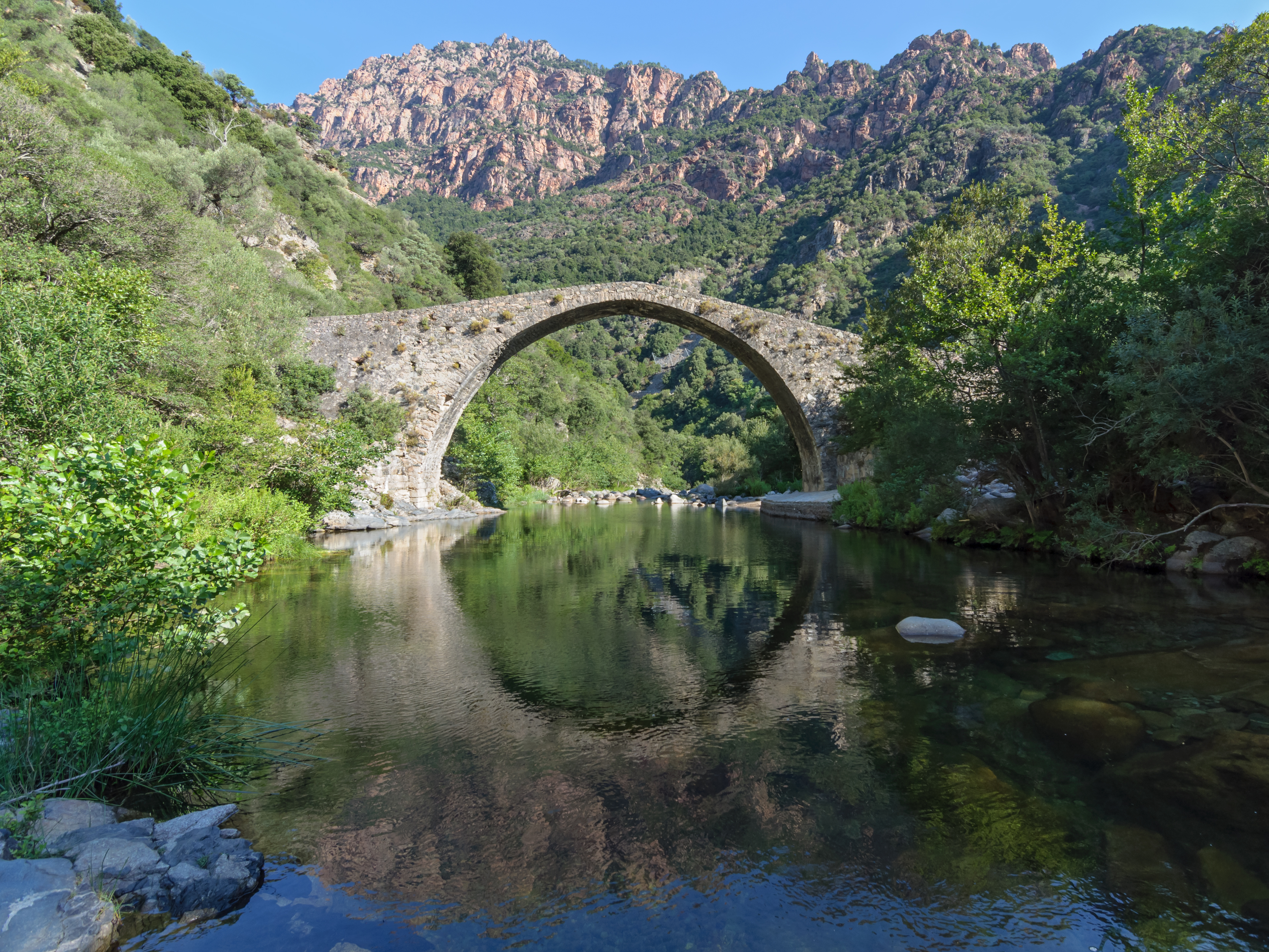
- Genoese bridge at Pianella

- Location within Corsica Location within France

Location
- Country: France
- Department: Corse-du-Sud

Physical characteristics
- Mouth: Mediterranean Sea
  - coordinates: 42.2667°N 8.6917°E
- Length: 23.3 km (14.5 mi)

The Porto (French: Rivière de Porto) is a small coastal river in the northwest of the department of Corse-du-Sud, Corsica, France.

== Location ==
The Porto is 23.3 kilometres (14.5 mi) long. It crosses the communes of Cristinacce, Évisa, Marignana and Ota. It rises in the Cristinacce commune to the south of the 1,712 metres (5,617 ft) Capu a Rughia, just west of the border with Haute-Corse. The source is at an elevation of 1,571 metres (5,154 ft). It flows in a generally southwest direction to the village of Cristinacce, then west past the villages of Évisa, Marignana and Ota to enter the Golfe de Porto in the village of Porto. The D84 road follows the lower part of the river.

== Bridges ==
Two of the bridges are classified as historical monuments.

- The Zaglia Bridge crosses the Tavulella stream in the gorges of Spelunca. It was classified as a Historic Monument by decree of June 26, 1990.
- The Pianella Bridge spans the Porto at Ponte-Vecchju in Ota. The Pianella bridge, which dates from the fifteenth century, was classified as a historic monument by decree of November 29, 1976.

== Mouth ==
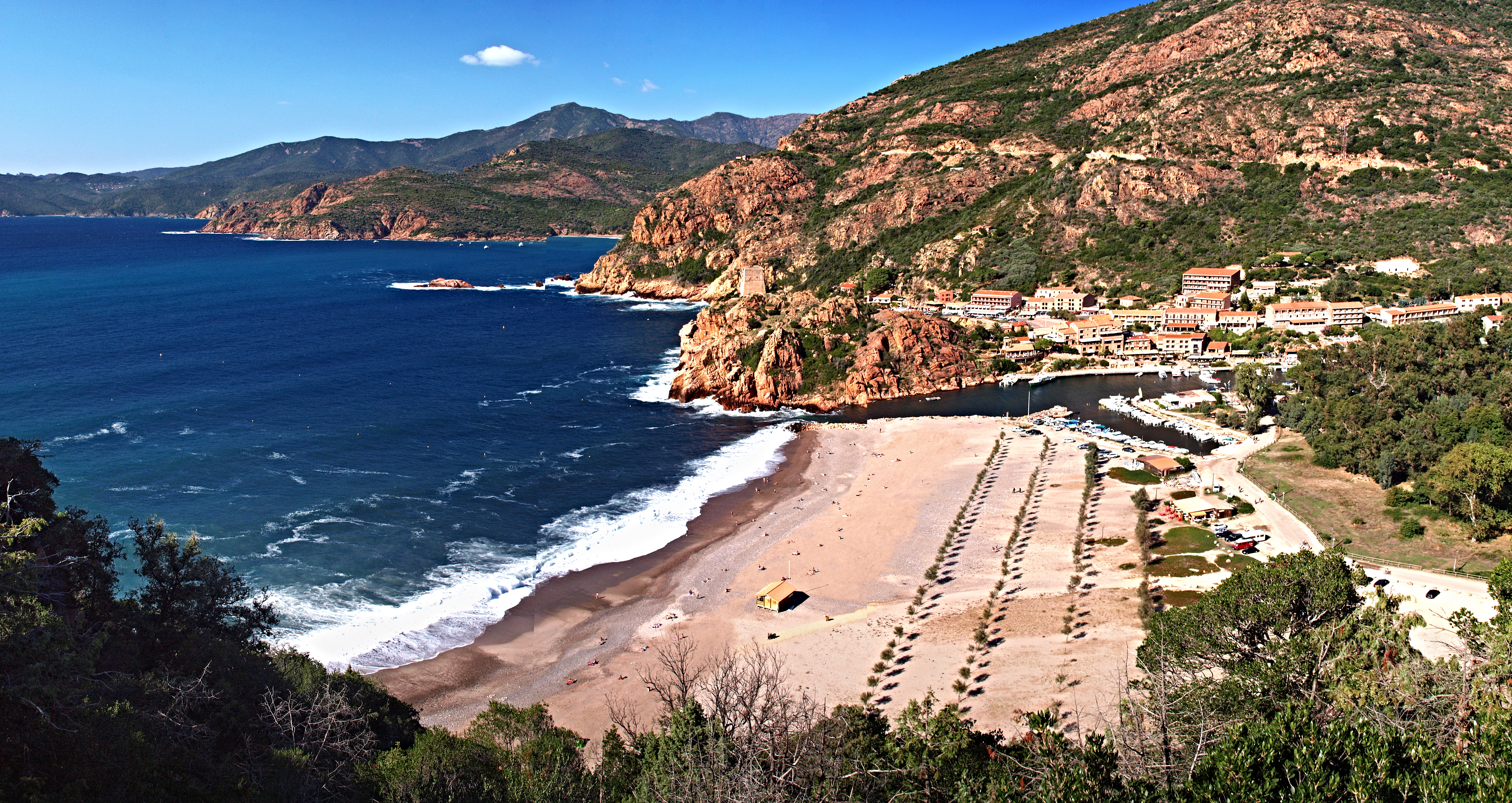
Porto. Genoese tower visible above the river mouth

The port of Porto is guarded by a square tower at its entrance. The Tour génoise de Porto was built by the Genoese, and stands on a rocky promontory looking over the sea. It has been renovated and hosts an exhibit on the fortifications of the Corsican shores. The coastal village has large buildings that seem inappropriate for a small settlement that cannot expand due to lack of available land. There is a pebble beach, and behind the coastal barrier there are eucalyptus plantations.

== Valley ==
The lower and middle parts of the valley are in the Sevi Infora landscape. The Porto river descends to the coast through a deep and narrow valley. There is luxuriant vegetation in the valley floor below bare rocky walls. The walls of the valley, which is not visible from the sea, rise to 1,294 metres (4,245 ft) less than 3 kilometres (1.9 mi) from the shore. The village of Ota is 5 kilometres (3.1 mi) from the sea on a slope below the 1,220 metres (4,000 ft) crest of Andatone. It is surrounded by olive groves, holm oaks and chestnut trees. Upstream of Ota a dominant position named U Castellu was settled in prehistoric times, and later was the site of a castle that controlled access to Porto from the fertile valleys of the high mountain territory.

Edward Lear (1812–1888) wrote of the central valley in his Journal of an English Landscape Designer (1868),

The northern part of this gorge, in the territory of Ota, is home to thriving crops, olive trees, terraced vines; opposite, where the forest road blossoms, a wild, different universe prevails: chasms, chestnut trees with dazzling spring adornments emerge among the ferns, foxgloves, fields of cyclamen, enhanced by the livid bells of amaryllis. During this ascent, the gigantic mountains glimpsed through the side openings of the Ota valley are revealed.

The upper valley is in the Sevi Ingrentu landscape, and contains the valleys of the Lonca and Aïtone tributaries of the Porto, and the Tavulella tributary of the Aïtone. The three valleys are almost parallel, and are oriented southwest. Each valley has a narrow gorge cut into the mountain barrier, which higher up gives way to a more open terrain. Edward Lear wrote in 1868 “Look at the high peaks, beyond the pass, the massive dark pine forest contrasts with the golden green undulations of the birch wood. While strolling in the heart of a shaded valley, you notice the lights on the road, or the immaculate snow on the verges. Omnipresent beauty."

== Hydrology ==
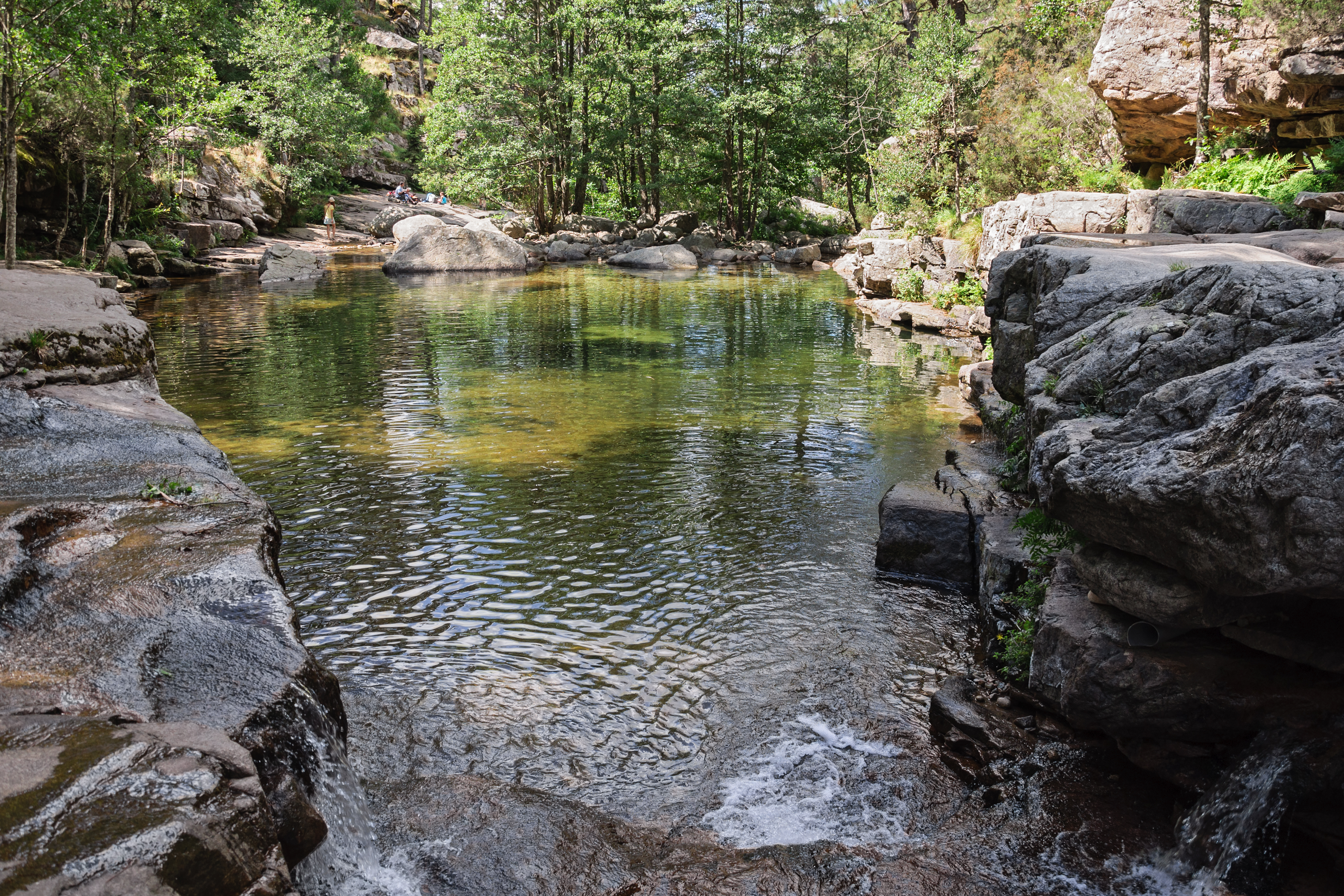
Natural pool on the Aitone tributary

Measurements of the river flow were taken at the Ota station from 1996 to 2021. The watershed above this station covers 103 square kilometres (40 sq mi). The maximum daily flow was 145 cubic metres per second (5,100 cu ft/s) recorded on 6 November 2000. Average annual precipitation was calculated as 890 millimetres (35 in). The average flow of water throughout the year was 2.89 cubic metres per second (102 cu ft/s).

Average flow (cubic meters per second) by month for the period 1996 to 2021
Month	Flow
Jan	4.880
Feb	4.660
Mar	4.470
Apr	3.360
May	2.280
Jun	1.040
Jul	0.269
Aug	0.196
Sep	0.759
Oct	1.750
Nov	5.510
Dec	5.710

== Tributaries ==
The following streams (ruisseaux) are tributaries of the Porto (ordered by length) and sub-tributaries:

- Lonca: 15 km (9.3 mi)
  - Forca Ai Tassi: 4 km (2.5 mi)
  - Calavalonda: 3 km (1.9 mi)
  - San Leonardo: 3 km (1.9 mi)
  - Casa Infurcata: 2 km (1.2 mi)
  - Pozzitondi: 2 km (1.2 mi)
  - Corgola: 1 km (0.62 mi)
  - Piscio: 1 km (0.62 mi)
  - Lumio: 1 km (0.62 mi)
- Aitone: 12 km (7.5 mi)
  - Spurtellu: 5 km (3.1 mi)
  - Casterica: 3 km (1.9 mi)
  - Luzzichelli: 2 km (1.2 mi)
  - Sindacchi: 2 km (1.2 mi)
    - Carchetu: 1 km (0.62 mi)
  - Rughia: 2 km (1.2 mi)
  - Manuella: 1 km (0.62 mi)
  - Punticelli: 1 km (0.62 mi)
    - Novali Piani: 1 km (0.62 mi)
- Enova: 4 km (2.5 mi)
  - Vitrone: 2 km (1.2 mi)
- Lamatoghiu: 3 km (1.9 mi)
  - Campoghiu: 3 km (1.9 mi)
    - Pirellu: 1 km (0.62 mi)
  - Pertusella: 2 km (1.2 mi)
  - Stazzona: 1 km (0.62 mi)
- Onda: 3 km (1.9 mi)
  - Vitullu: 4 km (2.5 mi)
    - Piotto: 1 km (0.62 mi)
- Campi Solcu: 3 km (1.9 mi)
- Riu: 3 km (1.9 mi)
- Vignale: 2 km (1.2 mi)
- Faeta: 2 km (1.2 mi)
- Ariola: 2 km (1.2 mi)
- Fiume Seccu: 2 km (1.2 mi)
- Erbaghiu Vecchiu: 2 km (1.2 mi)
  - La Rocca: 1 km (0.62 mi)
- Albia: 2 km (1.2 mi)
- Bartoli: 1 km (0.62 mi)
- Aghiola: 1 km (0.62 mi)
- Cotto: 1 km (0.62 mi)
- Crocicchia: 1 km (0.62 mi)
- Pettinelli: 1 km (0.62 mi)
- Rotte: 1 km (0.62 mi)

== Sources ==
- "4.02 - Sevi Infora" (PDF), Atlas des paysages de la Region Corse (in French), Direction régionale de l’environnement, de l’aménagement et du logement Corse
- "3.14 - Sevi Ingrentu" (PDF), Atlas des paysages de la Region Corse (in French), Direction régionale de l’environnement, de l’aménagement et du logement Corse
- Le Porto à Ota, Ministère de l'Ecologie, du Développement Durable et de l'Energie
- "Pont de Zaglia", Base Mérimée (in French)
- "Pont génois de Pianella", Base Mérimée (in French)
- "Relation: Rivière de Porto (3307985)", OpenStreetMap
- "Rivière de Porto", Sandre (in French)
- "Tour génoise de Porto", Guide Michelin (in French)
