= Torra di Portu =

Genoese coastal defence tower in Corsica

Tower of Portu
- Torra di Portu (Corsican)
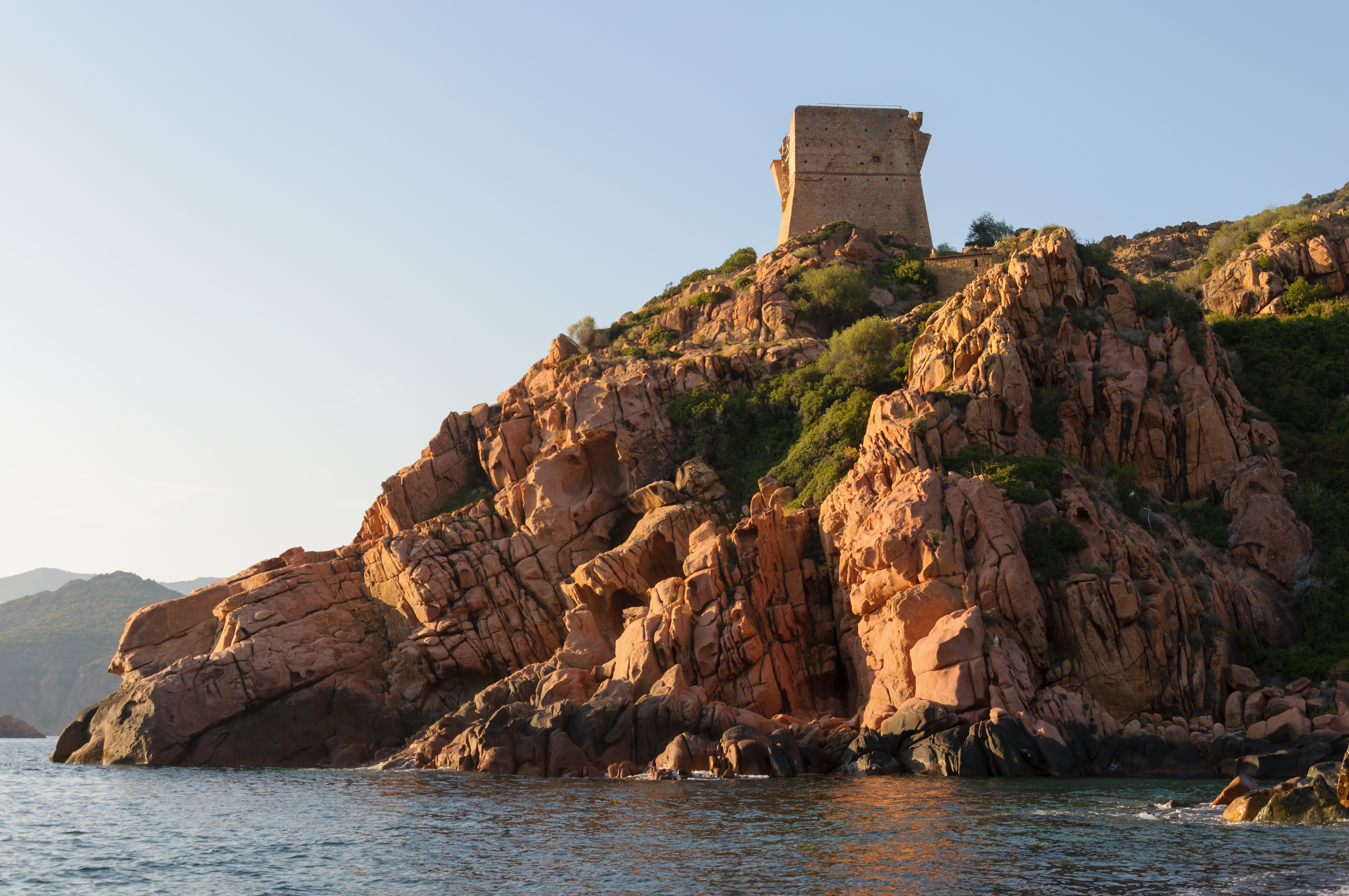

- Location within Corsica
- 42°16′4.2″N 8°41′30.3″E

History
- Built: 1551

Monument historique
- Type: inscrit
- Designated: 22 June 1946
- Reference no.: PA00099100

The Tower of Portu (Corsican: Torra di Portu) is a ruined Genoese tower located in the commune of Ota (Corse-du-Sud) on the west coast of the Corsica. The tower sits on a rocky outcrop at a height of 45 metres (148 ft) in the Gulf of Porto.

The construction of the Tower of Portu began in around 1551. It was one of a series of coastal defences constructed by the Republic of Genoa between 1530 and 1620 to stem the attacks by Barbary pirates. The tower was one of the earliest towers built on the west coast of Corsica. The design of the tower is unusual in being square rather than round. It is owned by the department and in 1946 was listed as one of the official historical monuments of France.

== See also ==
- List of Genoese towers in Corsica
