= Torra di Turghju =

Genoese coastal defence tower in Corsica

Tower of Turghiu
- Torra di Turghju (Corsican)
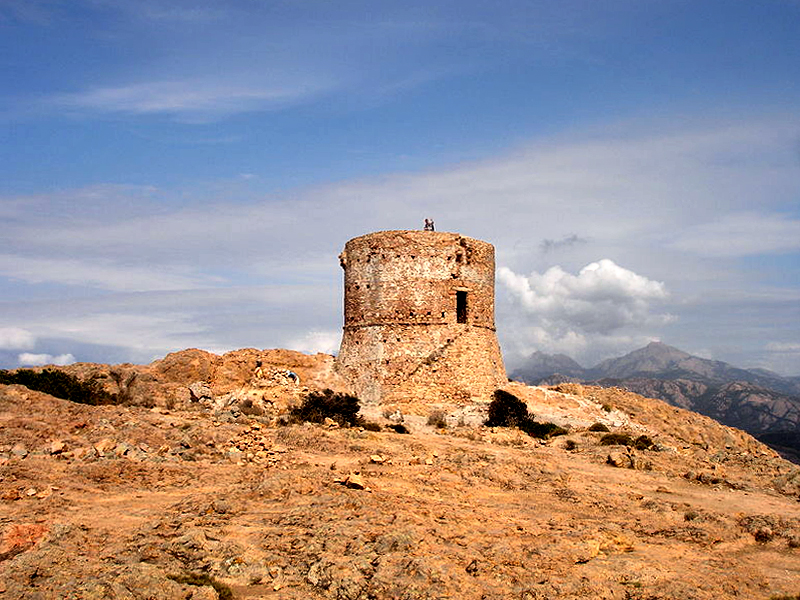

- Location within Corsica
- 42°14′11.6″N 8°33′7.7″E

History
- Built: 1608

Site notes
- Architect: Anton Giovani Sarrola

The Tower of Turghju or Tower of Capu Rossu (Corsican: Torra di Turghju) is a ruined Genoese tower located in the commune of Piana (Corse-du-Sud) on the west coast of the French island of Corsica. The tower sits at an elevation of 330 metres (1,080 ft) on the summit of the Capu Rossu headland which forms the southern limit of the Golfe de Porto.

The tower was built in 1608 under the direction of Anton Giovanni Sarrola with the assistance of Marco Clemente and Taddeo Cantone. It was one of a series of coastal defences constructed by the Republic of Genoa between 1530 and 1620 to stem the attacks by Barbary pirates.

== See also ==
- List of Genoese towers in Corsica
