= Scandola Nature Reserve =

UNESCO World Heritage Site
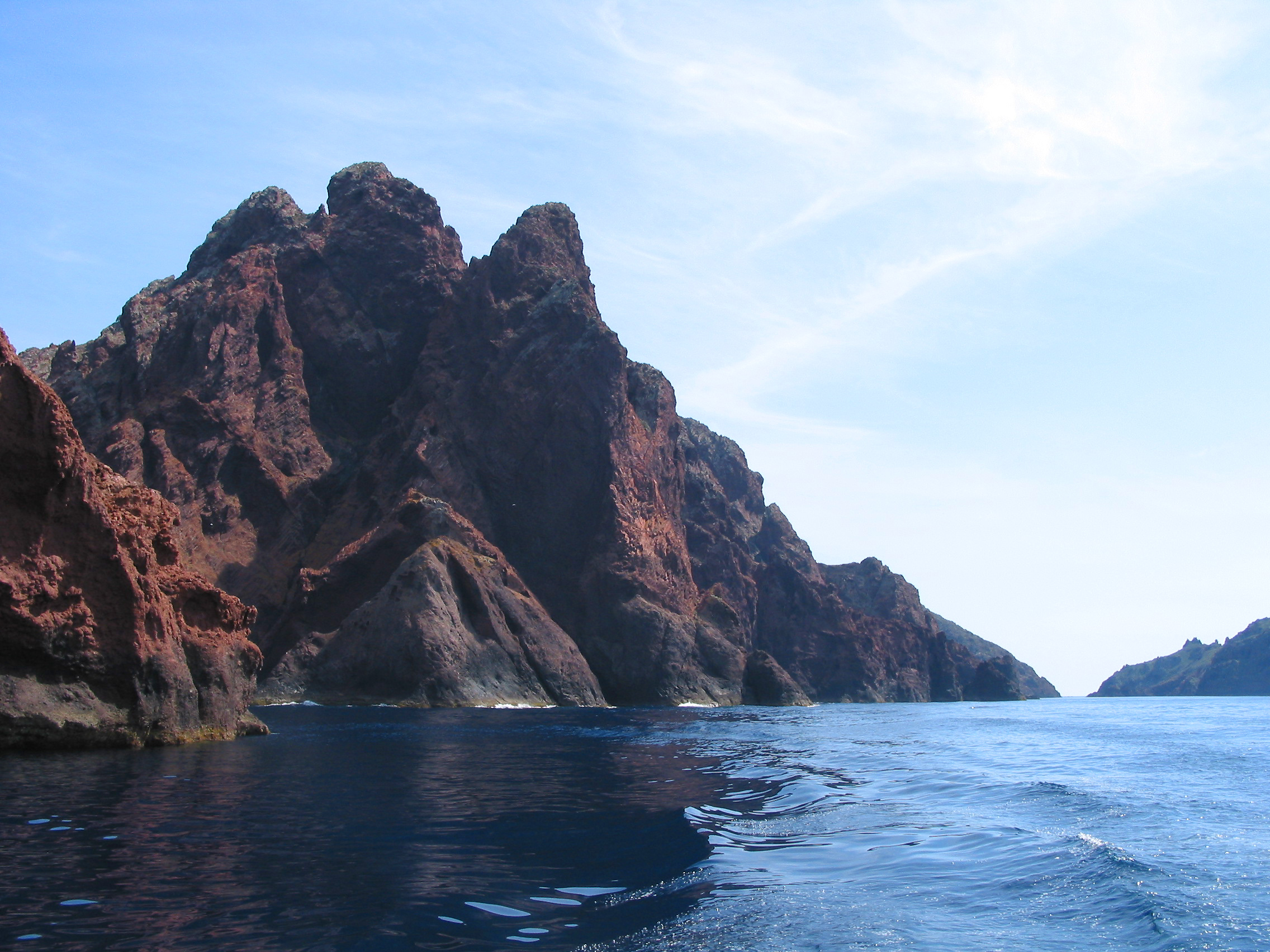

- Location within Corsica Location within France
- Location: Corsica, France
- Part of: Gulf of Porto: Calanche of Piana, Gulf of Girolata, Scandola Reserve
- Criteria: Natural: (vii), (viii), (x)
- Reference: 258
- Inscription: 1983 (7th Session)
- Coordinates: 42°21′25″N 8°34′0″E

The Scandola Nature Reserve is located on the west coast of the French island of Corsica, within the Corsica Regional Park. The reserve was established in 1975. The park and reserve has been recognized by the United Nations as a Natural UNESCO World Heritage Site since 1983 because of its beauty, rich biodiversity, and maquis shrubland.

== Location ==
The Scandola Reserve is situated on the west coast of Corsica between Punta Muchillina and Punta Nera and includes Cape Girolata and Cape Porto. The reserve covers an area of 19.19 km^{2} (7.41 mi^{2}) of which 9.19 km^{2} (3.55 mi^{2}) is land and 10 km^{2} (3.9 mi^{2}) is sea.

== Physical features ==
The reserve has two sectors, the Elpa Nera inlet and the peninsula of Scandola. The jagged and sheer cliffs contain many grottos and are flanked by numerous stacks and almost inaccessible islets and coves, such as Tuara. The coastline is also noted for its red cliffs, sand beaches, and headlands.

The reserve has a Mediterranean climate, with hot, dry summers. The average yearly maximum temperature is 28 degrees C, whereas the average minimum temperature is 3 degrees C.

== Biodiversity ==
The coastal area around the Scandola Nature Reserve have open cliff-top grass swards and tall maquis shrubland, although it has been degraded by historical fires and agriculture. Many species of lizards, snakes, birds, and geckos have been recorded within the park. Precious coral lives in the littoral zone directly off of the coast, and the strong currents in the Gulf of Porto allow for large numbers of fish to congregate. There was once a population of endangered Mediterranean monk seals of the coast of the nature reserve, but they have since disappeared.

== Protection ==
In 1930, a law was passed prohibiting destruction or modification within Corsica Regional Park. Scandola Nature Reserve is strictly protected in order to return the area to its natural state.

== Gallery ==
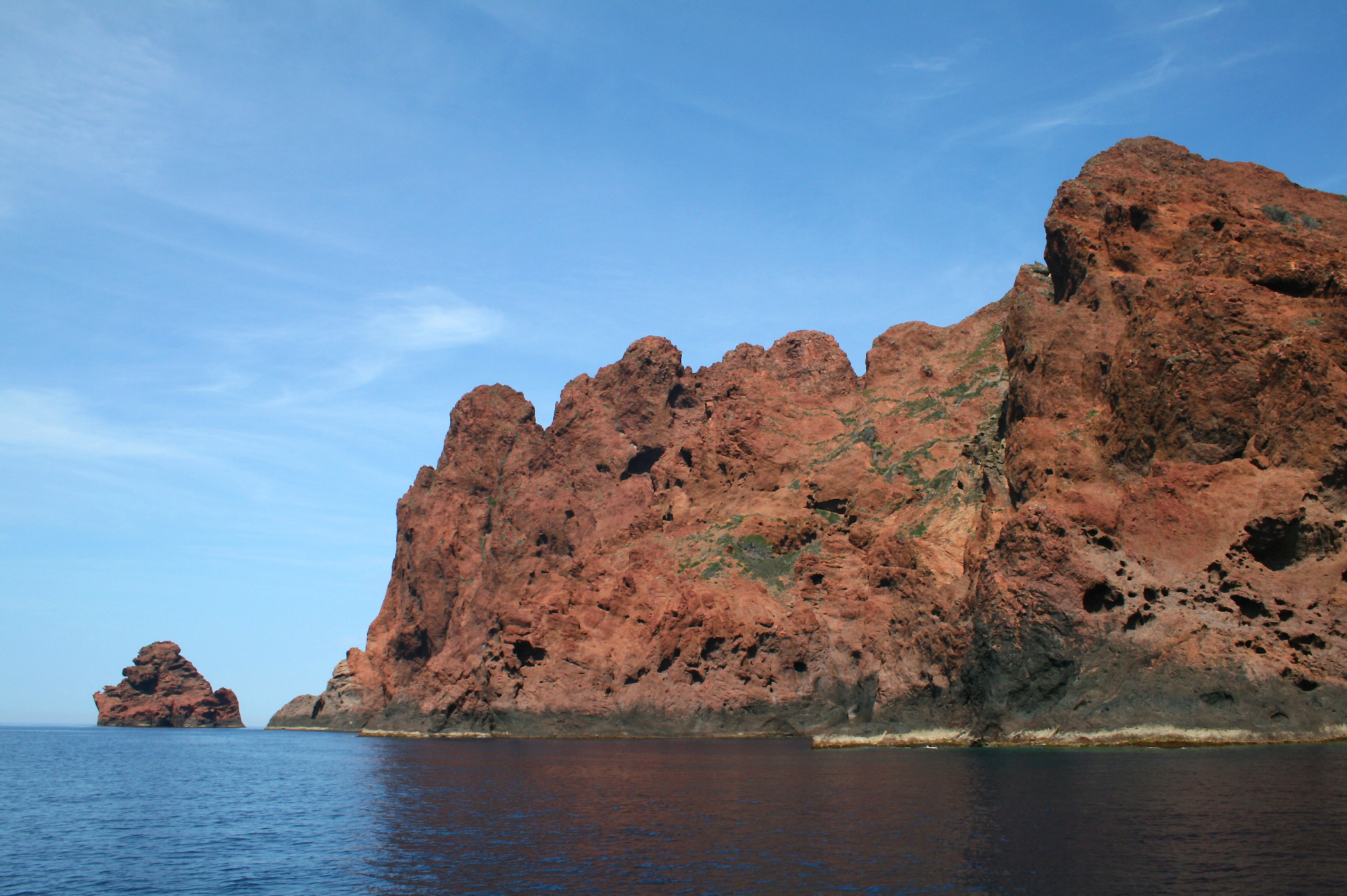
Gargalo island and Palazzu block.

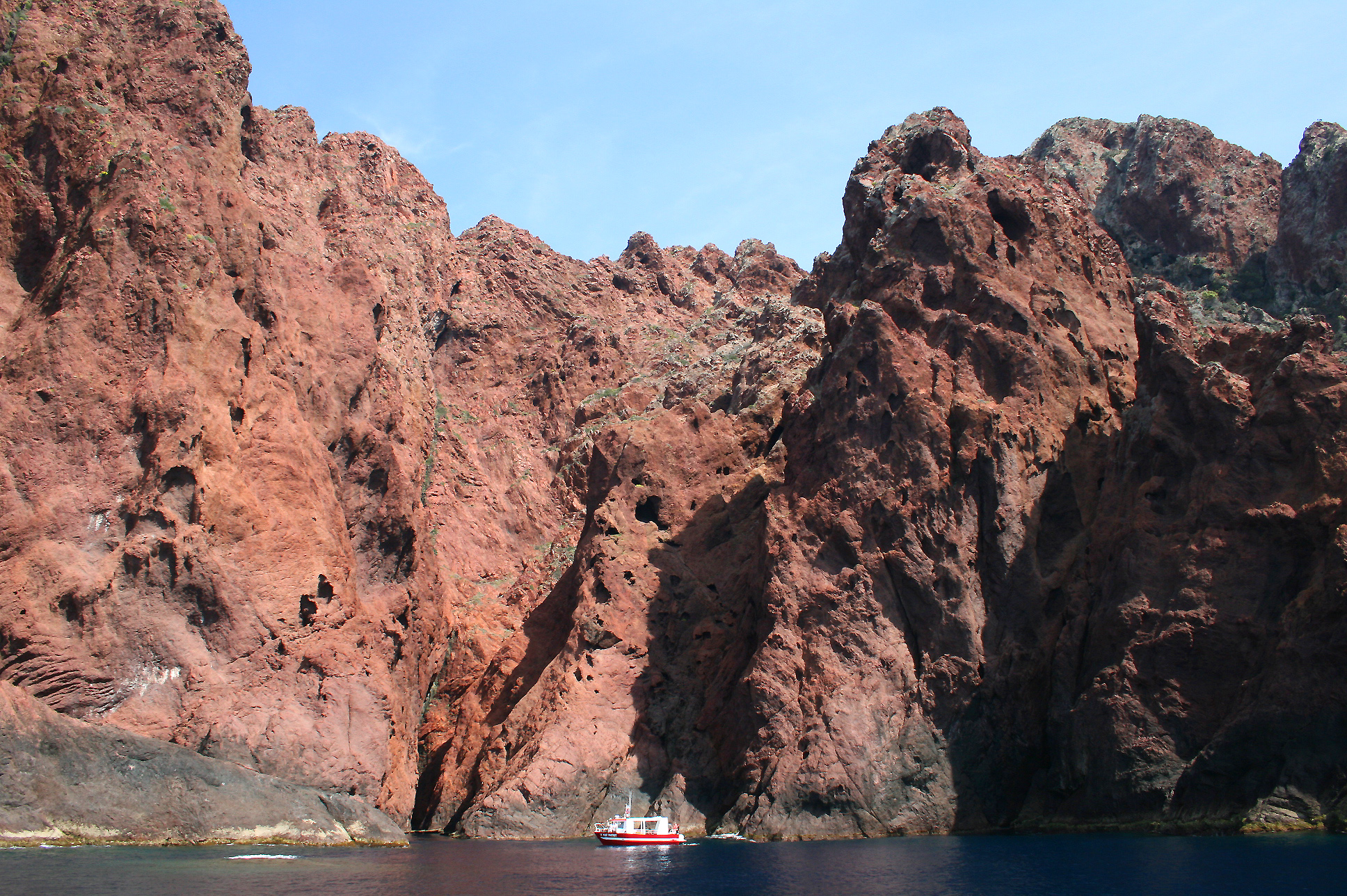
Red Rhyolite.

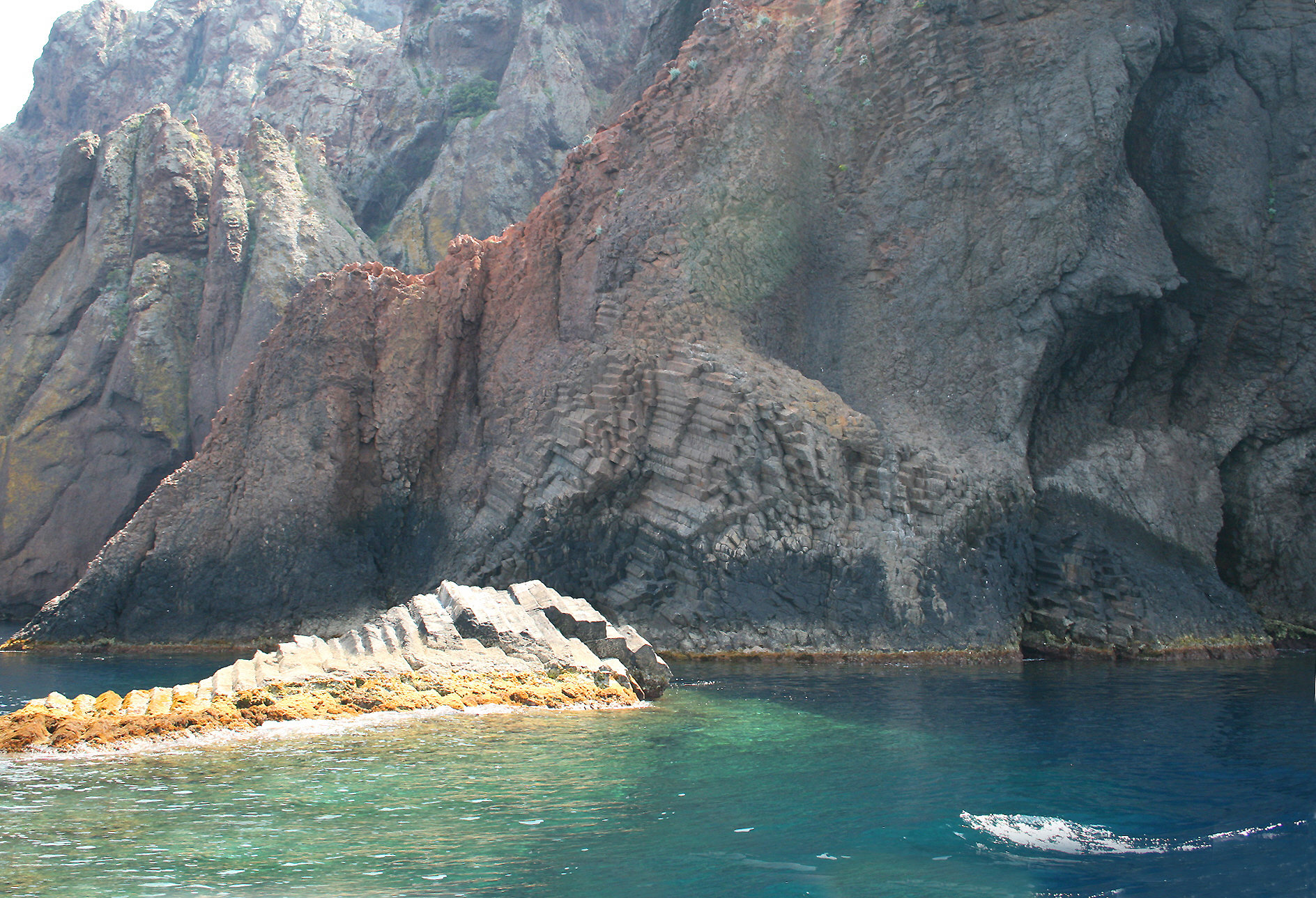
Columnars jointed basalt.

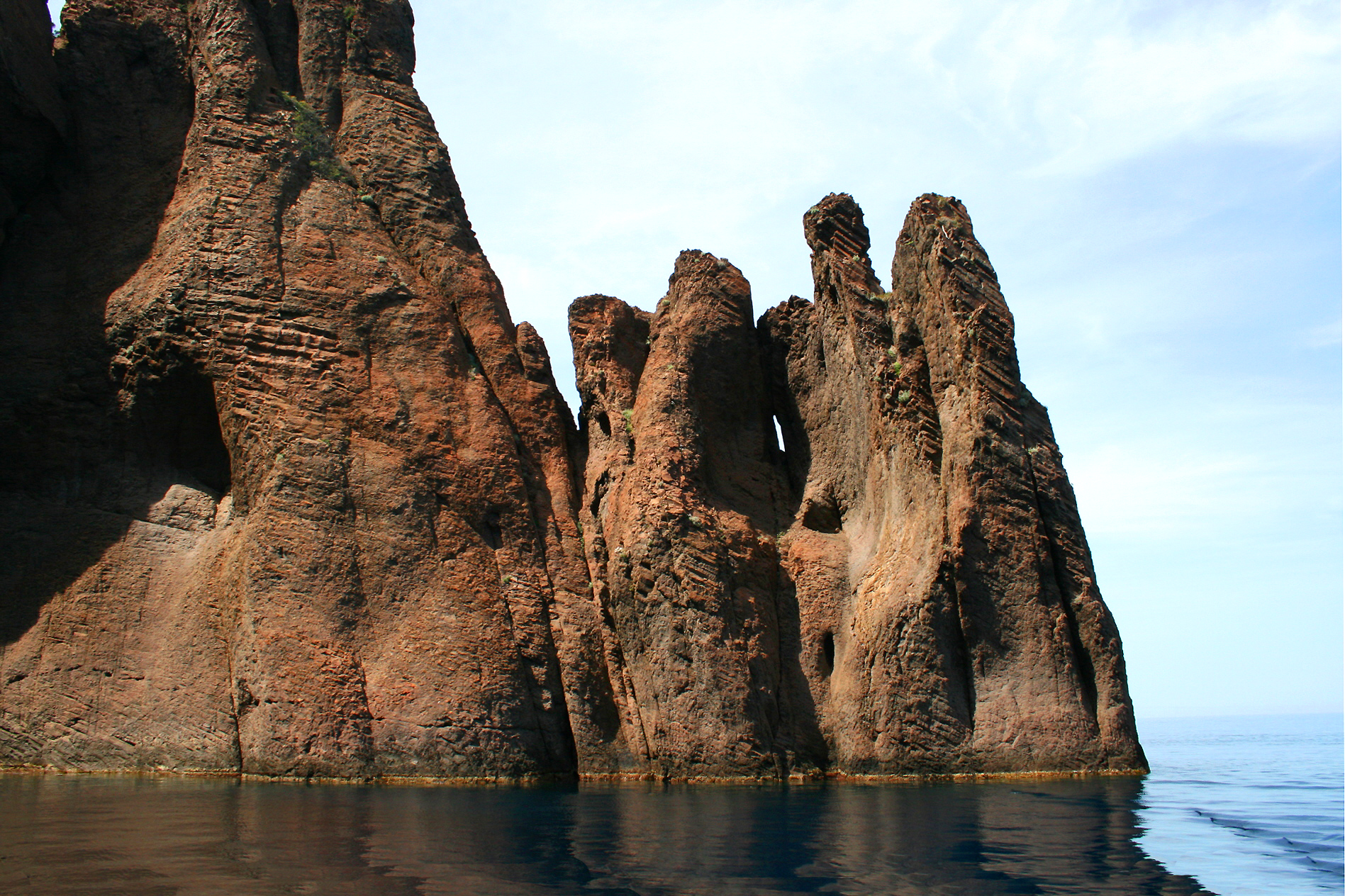
Red Rhyolite cliffs.

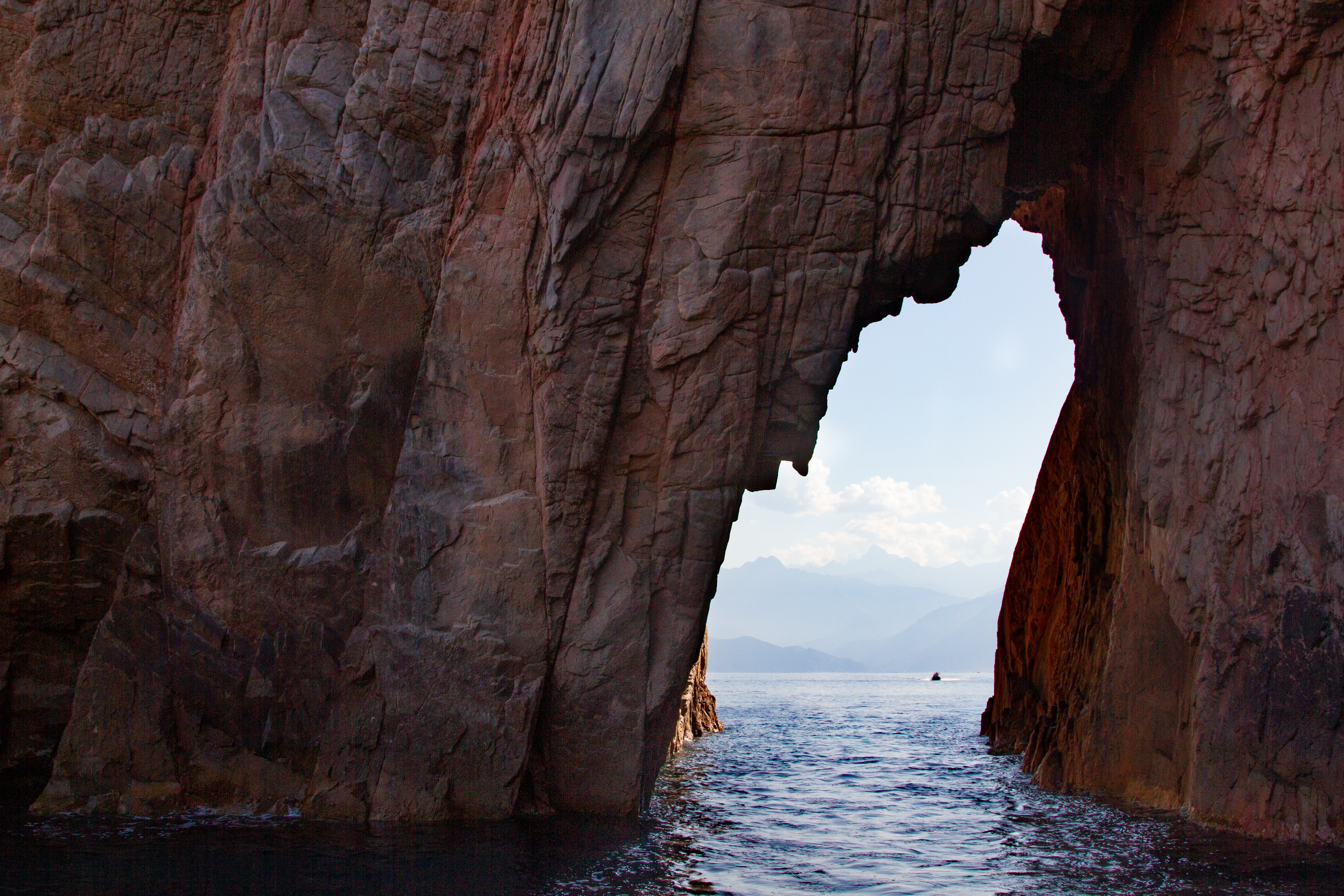
Rhyolite arch.
