= Ota, Corse-du-Sud =

Commune in Corsica, France

Ota
- Commune
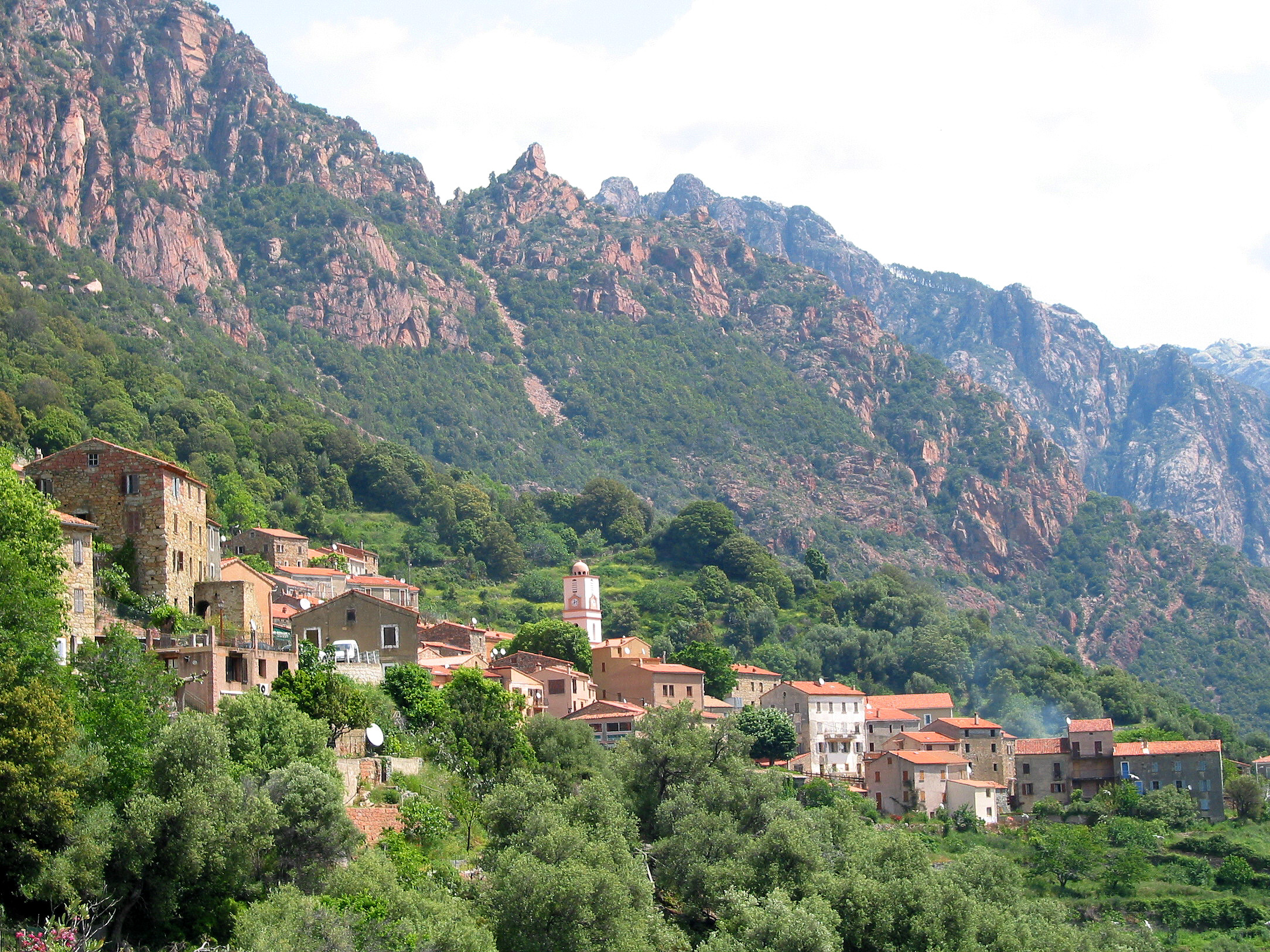
- The village of Ota
- Location of Ota
- Location within France Location within Corsica
- Coordinates: 42°15′32″N 8°44′39″E
- Country: France
- Region: Corsica
- Department: Corse-du-Sud
- Arrondissement: Ajaccio
- Canton: Sevi-Sorru-Cinarca

Government
  - Mayor (2020–2026): Pierre Paul de Pianelli
- Area^{1}: 38.16 km^{2} (14.73 sq mi)
- Elevation: 320 m (1,050 ft)
- Highest elevation: 1,326 m (4,350 ft)
- Lowest elevation: 0 m (0 ft)
- Population (2023): 470
  - Density: 12/km^{2} (32/sq mi)
- Time zone: UTC+01:00 (CET)
  - Summer (DST): UTC+02:00 (CEST)
- INSEE/Postal code: 2A198 /20150
- ^{1} French Land Register data, which excludes lakes, ponds, glaciers > 1 km^{2} (0.386 sq mi or 247 acres) and river estuaries.

Ota (French pronunciation: [ɔta]; Corsican: Otta) is a commune in the Corse-du-Sud department of France on the island of Corsica.

== Population ==
Historical population
Year	Pop.	±% p.a.
1968	444	—
1975	367	−2.68%
1982	408	+1.52%
1990	460	+1.51%
1999	452	−0.19%
2007	538	+2.20%
2012	589	+1.83%
2017	528	−2.16%
2023	470	−1.92%
Source: INSEE

== Sights ==
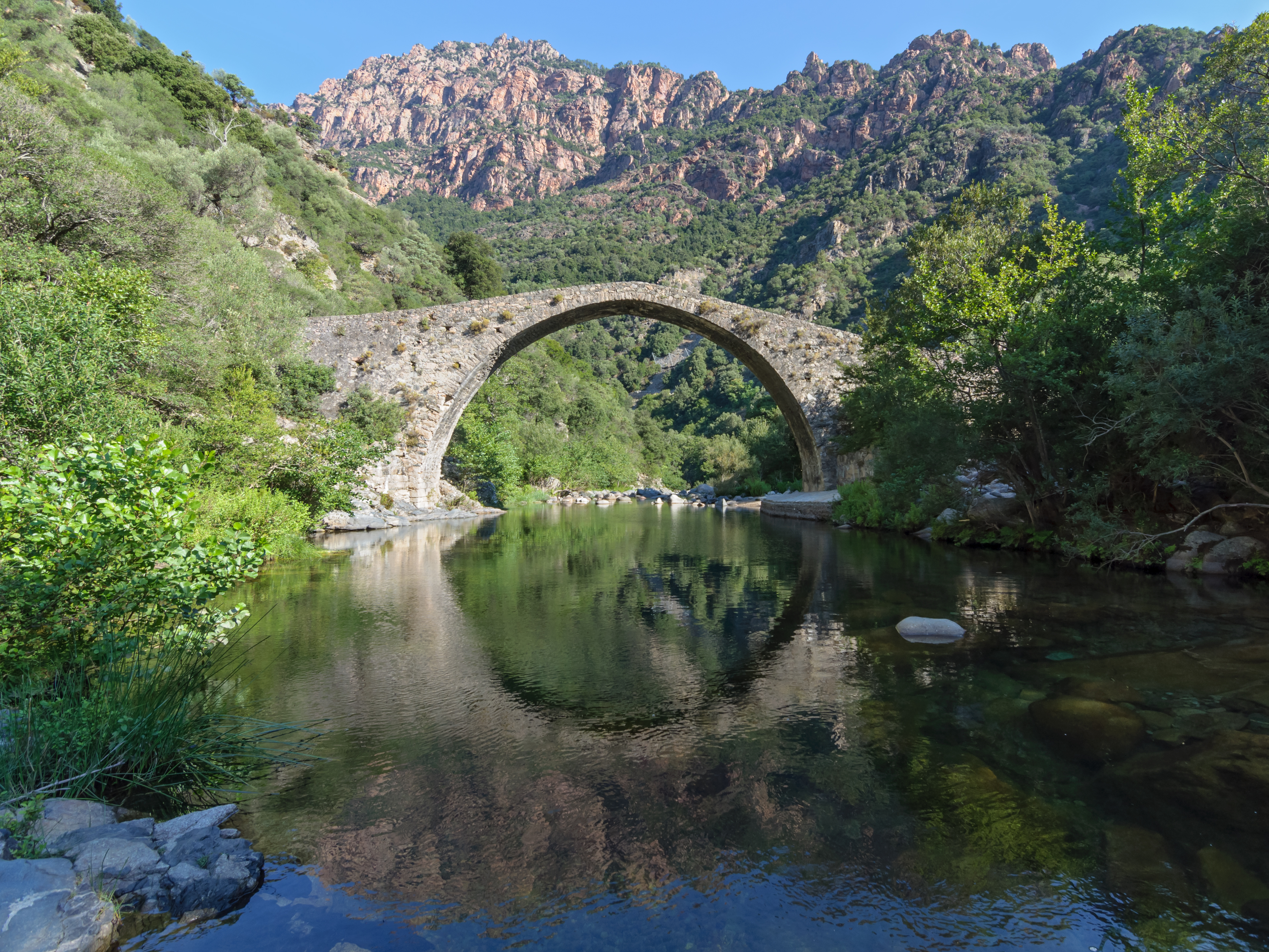
Ota, the Pianella bridge.

- Pianella bridge, a Genoese bridge from the 15th century
- Torra di Portu

== Notable Citizens ==
- Pasquino Corso ( Ota, ? - Rome, 15 July 1532), Condottiero.

== See also ==
- Communes of the Corse-du-Sud department
