= Piana, Corse-du-Sud =

Commune in Corsica, France

Piana
- Commune
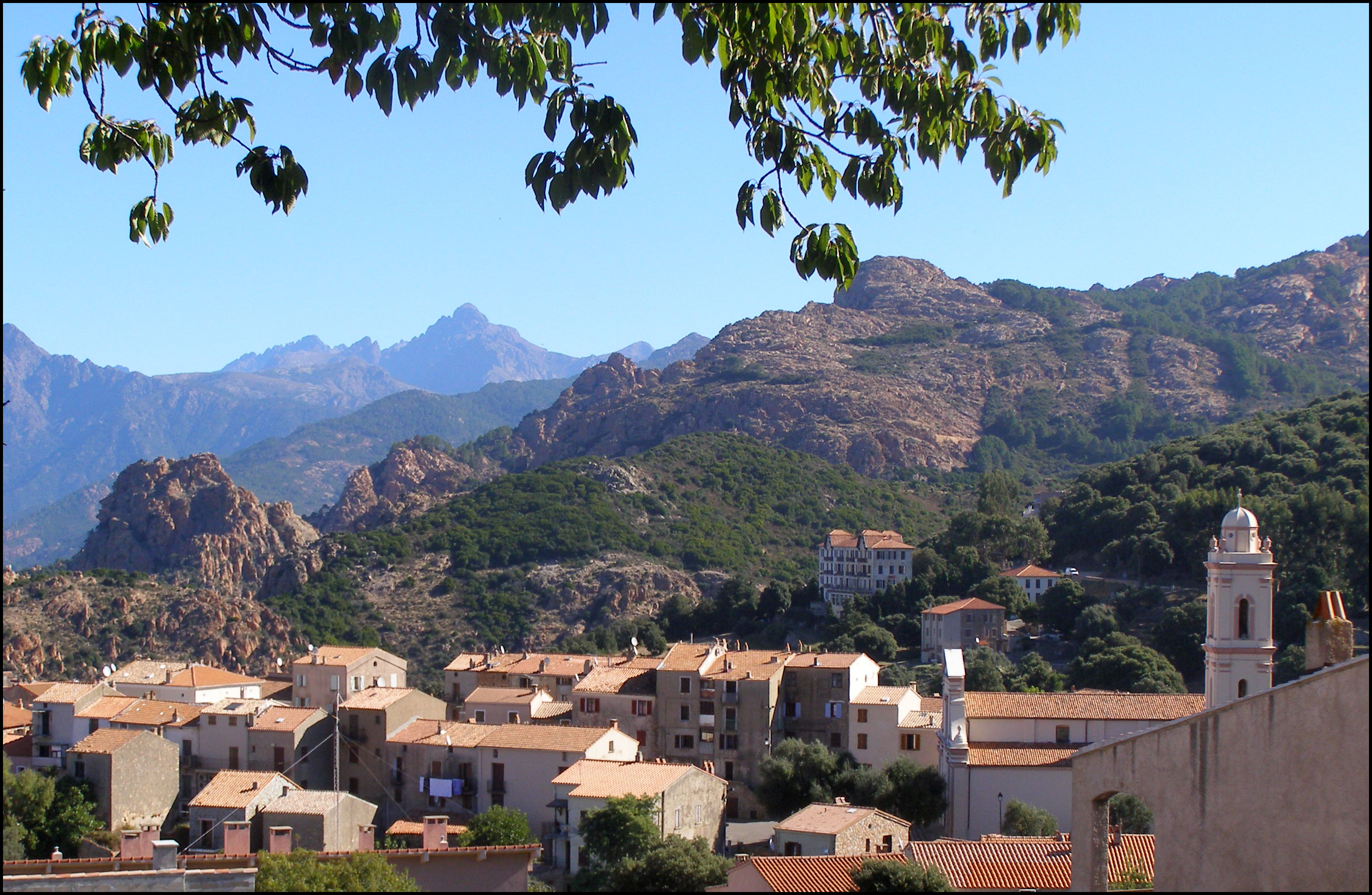

- Coat of arms
- Location of Piana
- Location within France Location within Corsica
- Coordinates: 42°14′24″N 8°38′13″E
- Country: France
- Region: Corsica
- Department: Corse-du-Sud
- Arrondissement: Ajaccio
- Canton: Sevi-Sorru-Cinarca

Government
  - Mayor (2020–2026): Pascaline Castellani
- Area^{1}: 62.63 km^{2} (24.18 sq mi)
- Elevation: 450 m (1,480 ft)
- Highest elevation: 1,332 m (4,370 ft)
- Lowest elevation: 0 m (0 ft)
- Population (2023): 452
  - Density: 7.22/km^{2} (18.7/sq mi)
- Time zone: UTC+01:00 (CET)
  - Summer (DST): UTC+02:00 (CEST)
- INSEE/Postal code: 2A212 /20115
- ^{1} French Land Register data, which excludes lakes, ponds, glaciers > 1 km^{2} (0.386 sq mi or 247 acres) and river estuaries.

Piana (French pronunciation: [pjana]) is a commune in the Corse-du-Sud department of France on the island of Corsica. It is a member of Les Plus Beaux Villages de France (The Most Beautiful Villages of France) Association.

== Population ==
Historical population
Year	Pop.	±% p.a.
1968	517	—
1975	513	−0.11%
1982	511	−0.06%
1990	500	−0.27%
1999	428	−1.71%
2007	439	+0.32%
2012	479	+1.76%
2017	482	+0.12%
2023	452	−1.07%
Source: INSEE

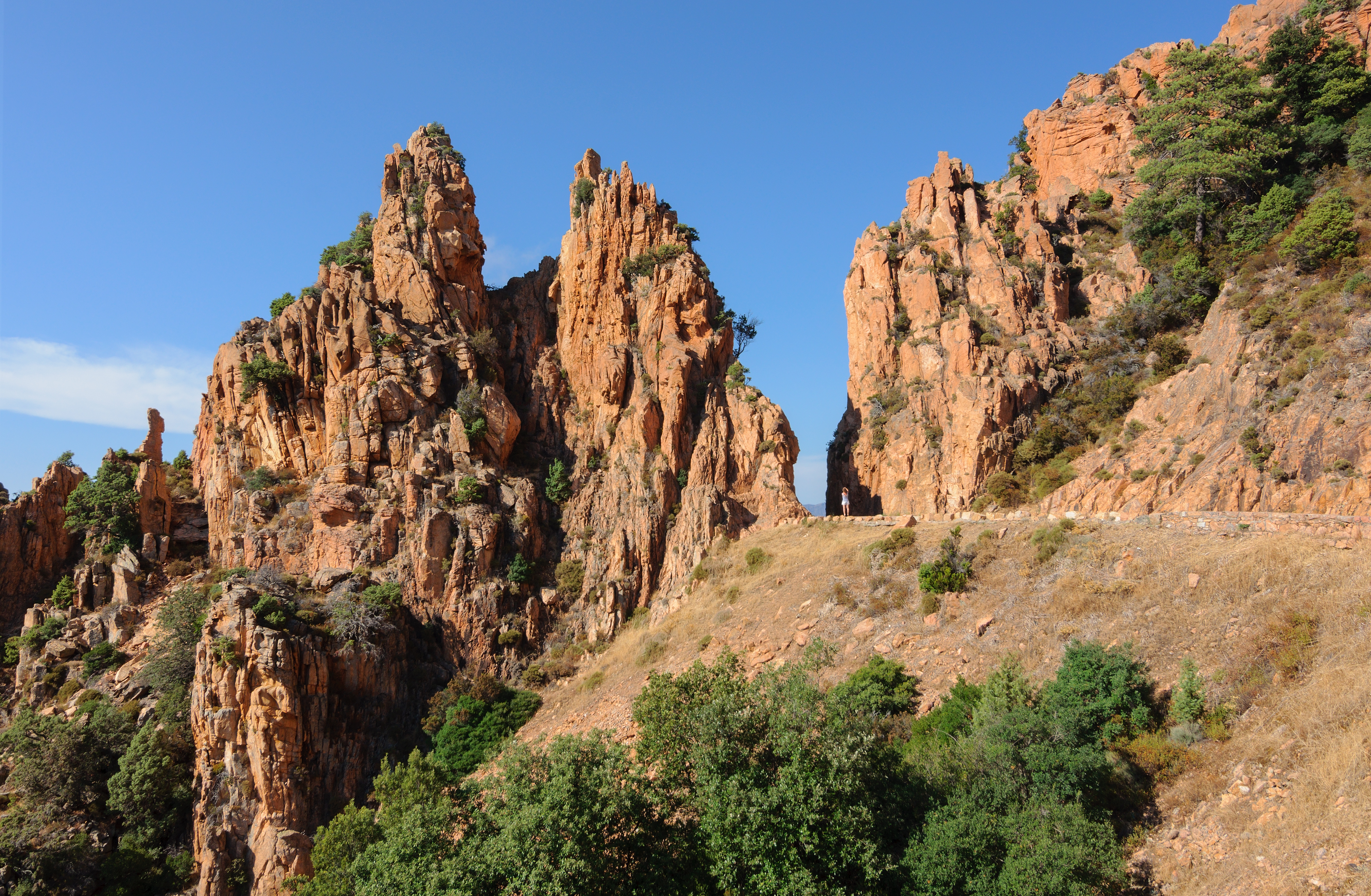
Calanques de Piana

== See also ==
- Communes of the Corse-du-Sud department
- Calanques de Piana, UNESCO World Heritage Site
- Torra di Turghju
