= Calanques de Piana =

Calanques in Piana, Corsica

UNESCO World Heritage Site
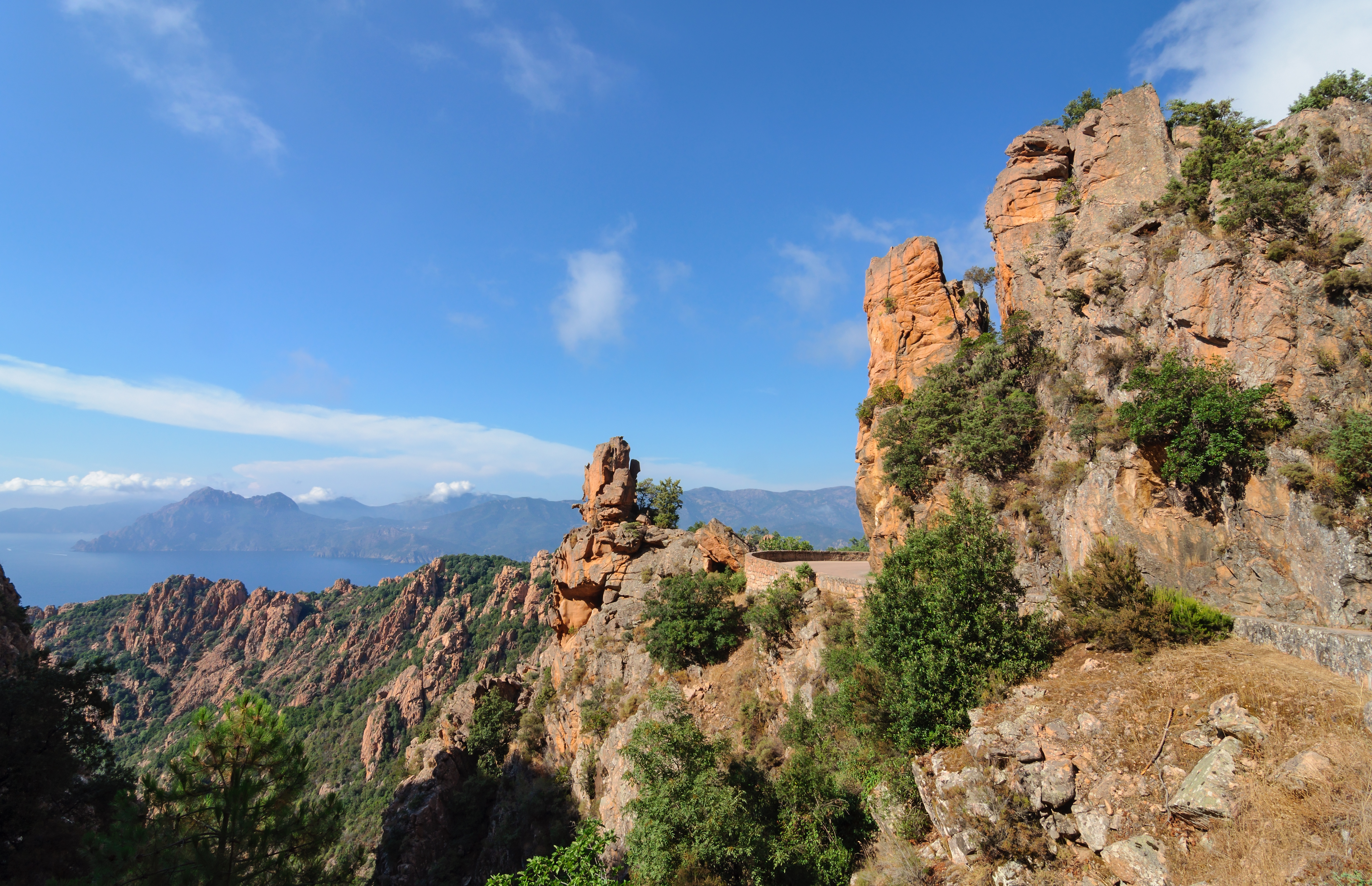
- Calanques de Piana

- Location within Corsica Location within France
- Location: Corsica, France
- Part of: Gulf of Porto: Calanche of Piana, Gulf of Girolata, Scandola Reserve
- Criteria: Natural: (vii), (viii), (x)
- Reference: 258
- Inscription: 1983 (7th Session)
- Coordinates: 42°15′09″N 8°39′26″E

Calanques de Piana (Corsican: calanchi di Piana or calanche di Piana) are Corsican calanques located in Piana, between Ajaccio and Calvi, in the Gulf of Porto. It is part of a UNESCO World Heritage Site that includes other sites in the Gulf of Porto, due to its beauty, rich marine biodiversity, and unique maquis shrubland. The jagged cliffs are made of red ochre.
