= Vivienne de Watteville =

British travel writer and adventurer (1900–1957)

Vivienne Florence Beatrice de Watteville
- Born: 17 August 1900; Somerset, England
- Died: 27 June 1957 (aged 56); England
- Education: The wilds of Sirdal, Norway
- Occupations: Travel writer, broadcaster, journalist
- Partner: George Gerard Goschen
- Writing career
- Genres: Autobiography, travel writing
- Notable work: Speak to the Earth (1935) Out in the Blue (1927)

Vivienne Florence Beatrice de Watteville (17 August 1900 – 27 June 1957) was a British travel writer and adventurer, author of two books based on her experiences in East Africa in the 1920s, Out in the Blue (1927) and Speak to the Earth (1935). She is best remembered for taking charge of and continuing an expedition in the Congo and Uganda at the age of 24, when her father was killed by a lion.

== Early life ==
Vivienne de Watteville was the only child of the Swiss-French naturalist and artist Bernard Perceval de Watteville (Bernhard Perceval von Wattenwyl, 1877–1924) and his English wife Florence Emily Beddoes (1876–1909). Her father had been a pupil of the painter Hubert von Herkomer before turning naturalist. Her mother died of cancer when she was nine, and she spent her childhood holidays from her English boarding-school (St. George's School, Ascot) tomboyishly alone with her father, whom she called 'Brovie' ['brother'], in remote parts of Norway and in the Alps. (He called her 'Murray, my son'.) She had wanted to go to Oxford University and earn her own living, but her father, possessive to a fault, had brushed aside both ideas.

== Out in the Blue (1927) ==
In 1923 Vivienne and her father, with a large team of African helpers, (Note: Vivienne often names her native helpers in the two Africa books, at least by given name (some thirty men are referred to personally), describing their characters and giving her thoughts on them. Some served on both expeditions, greeting her with joy at Nairobi station in 1928 and expressing delight at being chosen for another safari. After reaching the hut on Mt Kenya she retained only two, Magadi presumably taking the photograph of her and Siki below Coryndon Peak (see 'References').) set off on an eighteen-month safari through Kenya, Uganda and the Belgian Congo. It was primarily a hunt for big game, collecting fauna for the Natural History Museum of Bern, Switzerland, without the help of a professional hunter. In her first book, Out in the Blue (i.e. in the far country), published in 1927, she describes her experiences on safari. The de Wattevilles were troubled by marauding lions through much of their trip. Lions attacked the mules in the boma (camp enclosure) and Bernard shot several of the big cats. One, on the verge of starvation, stormed their camp and raced off with a canvas bathtub, which it tried to eat. Sometime later they found nails and torn bits of canvas in its droppings. (They found the remains of their missing Airedale Terrier inside a leopard.) At the start of the safari, Bernard de Watteville missed most of what he shot at; by the time he and his daughter reached the Congo, he had bagged more than a hundred trophies.

Their collection included the Big Five (elephant, lion, leopard, cape buffalo, and rhino). They also shot giraffe, over thirty types of antelope, and even a male mountain bongo, which took seven weeks of stalking in the Aberdare Range. With the help of Echuya Batwa (Pygmy) trackers, they approached gorillas in the Virunga Mountains but were unable to shoot one. They also wanted a northern white rhinoceros and had obtained special permission from the Ugandan authorities to shoot the animal.

Vivienne, then 23 years old, handled all the taxidermy, working to preserve whatever her father shot for the museum. She was, in addition, the camp nurse, relying heavily on Epsom salts and quinine powder, her cure-all remedies.

"My father went down with jaundice and I was crippled by veld sores (Africa's worst kind of boil). How I dreaded the wet branches that sprang back like a whip-lash against my festering shins. We all of us had septic throats, and the porters and cook went down with fever."

On 30 September 1924, on the Congolese shore of Lake Edward, shortly after being refused permission by the Belgian authorities to hunt the rare okapi, Bernard shot and wounded a lion, his nineteenth. Adhering to the hunting standard that no wounded animal should be abandoned (he had previously pursued wounded buffalo in thick cover), he followed the lion into a bed of reeds where it lunged at him and swatted him to the ground. He jumped to his feet and fired at the retreating animal, causing it to whirl around, attack and maul him, until he was able to shoot it while it was on top of him. Its claws, buried deeply in his body, had to be torn out one by one before he could push the body off him. Two hours later, bleeding profusely, Bernard staggered into camp where he collapsed in his daughter's tent. Vivienne did her best to save her father, treating his infected wounds with raw crystals of permanganate, but the bleeding could not be stopped. Bernard died later that night and was buried the day after. Though suffering from spirillum fever and shock, and though before her father's death she had killed nothing bigger than dik-dik and guinea fowl, Vivienne took charge of the safari and completed the mission, shooting both for the pot (she had a team of sixty native trackers, skinners and porters to feed) and for the collection. One of the remaining species on their license that she successfully hunted was a northern white rhinoceros.

"How many girls would not give way to despair, or at least would have only one idea, to get to the coast by the shortest route? Not so Miss de Watteville. She takes command, exerts authority, determines to continue the enterprise and complete her father’s work. There is nothing half-hearted in her efforts. Her men are hungry, she shoots meat for them; they are insubordinate, she has them flogged, and stands over them to see the flogging done; the expedition is incomplete without a white rhinoceros, she persists until one is slain."

― The Geographical Journal, Vol. LXIX, 1927

Vivienne returned to Europe in 1925 to write her book. Among admirers of Out in the Blue was Wilfred Thesiger, who was greatly impressed and moved by it. Despite the killing, the book is notable for its sensitive description of animals and landscape and for its note of regret. "To have been granted even one [bongo] cow was a great concession, for they are strictly preserved; to have slain two seemed to us nothing less than calamity." The de Watteville specimens, mounted, were exhibited from 1936 in the dioramas of the new Musée d'histoire naturelle at Bern.

=== Publishing history ===
A German translation of Out in the Blue by Rolf Bally was published in 1949 as In blaue Fernen: Afrikanische Jagdabenteuer (:'In blue distances: African hunting adventures'). A Spanish translation by Raquel Bahamonde Barreiro, Bajo el cielo azul (:'Under the blue sky'), was published in 2023, on the centenary of the expedition.

=== Natural History Museum of Bern: some de Watteville dioramas ===
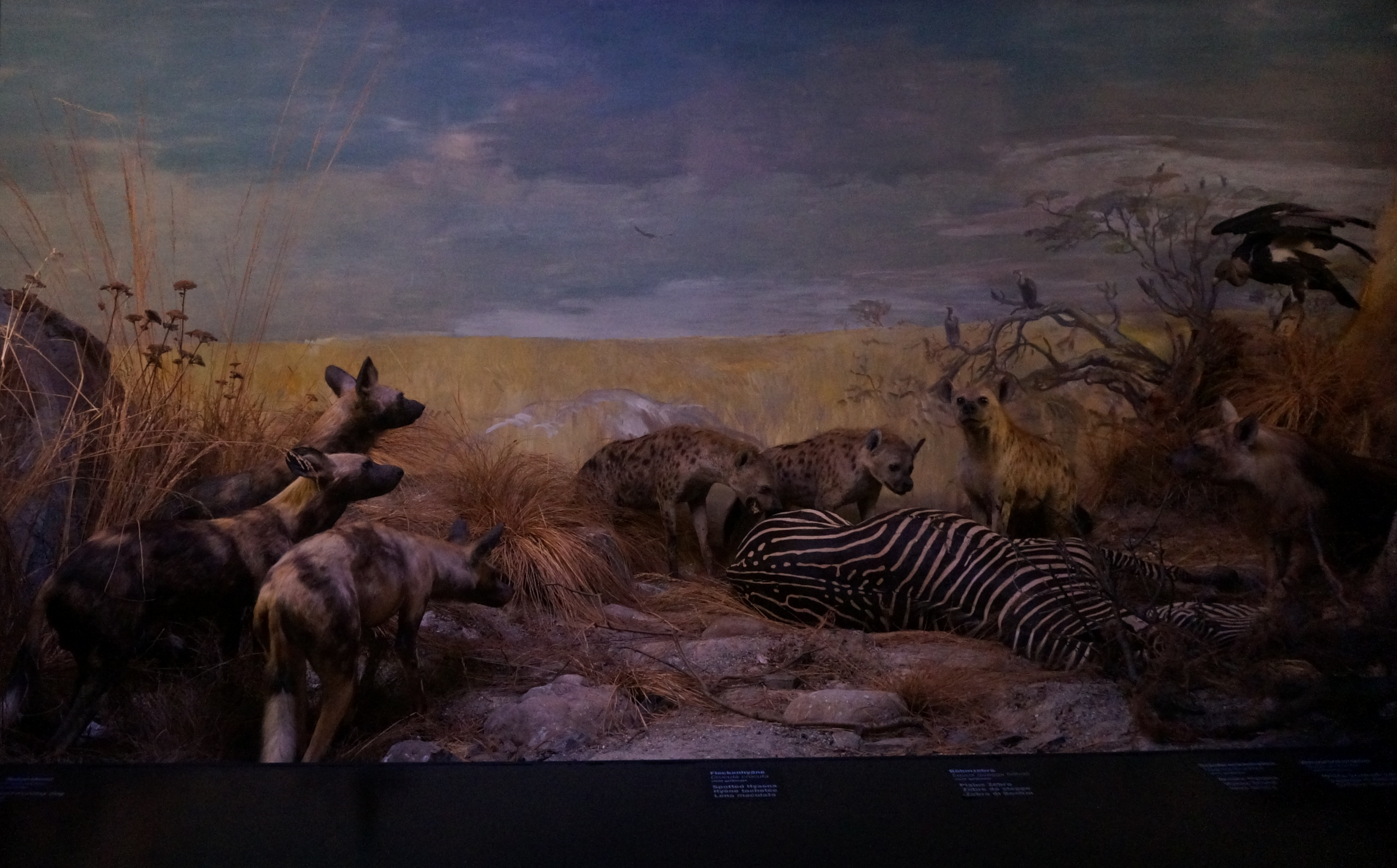
NHMB: Grévy's zebra, spotted hyenas, and African wild dogs, collected by Bernard de Watteville, July-October 1923

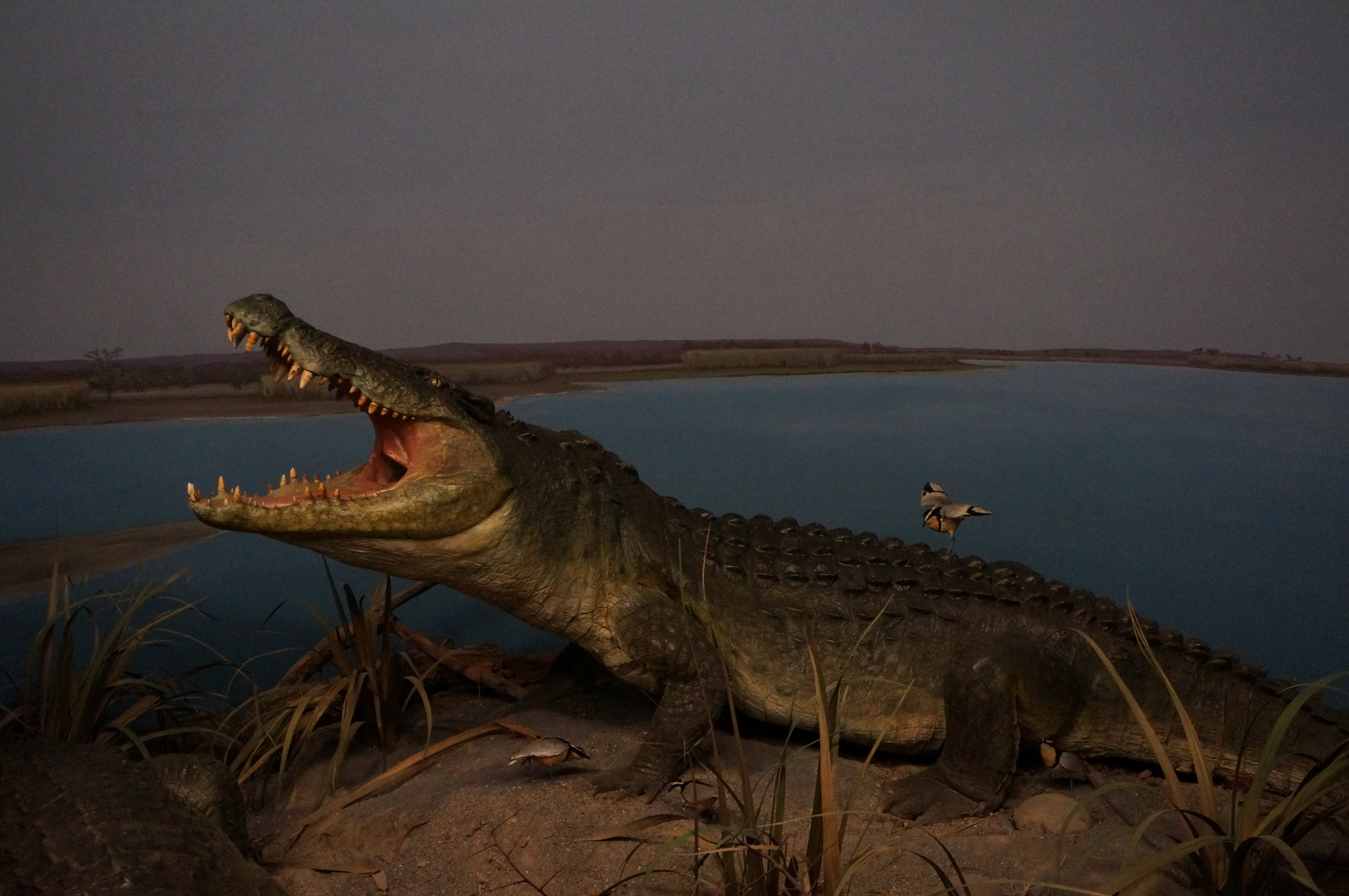
NHMB: twelve-foot crocodile shot at point blank range by Bernard de Watteville on the northern Uaso Nyiro, October 1923

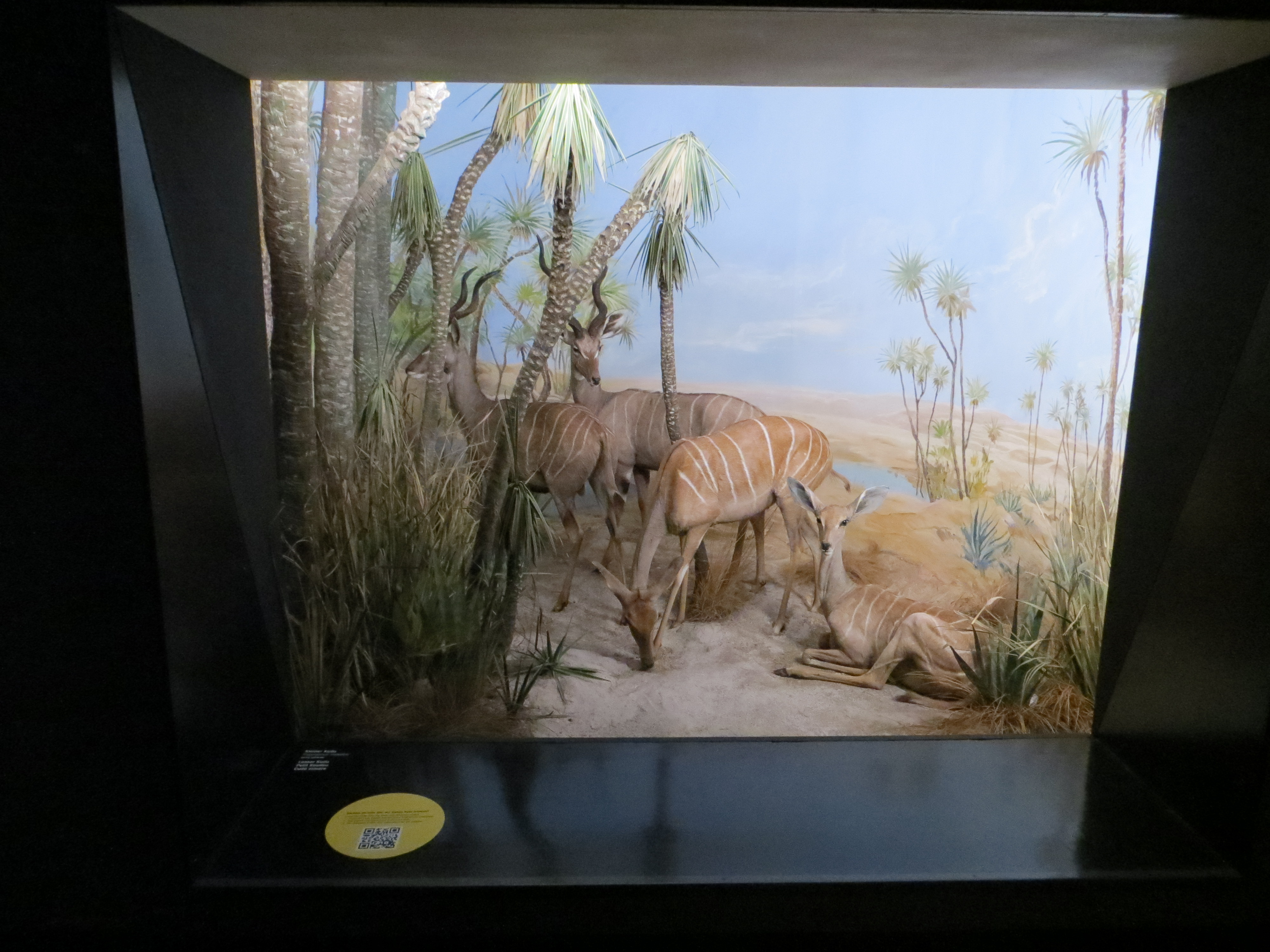
NHMB: lesser kudu collected by Bernard de Watteville on the Uaso Nyiro in northern Kenya, November 1923

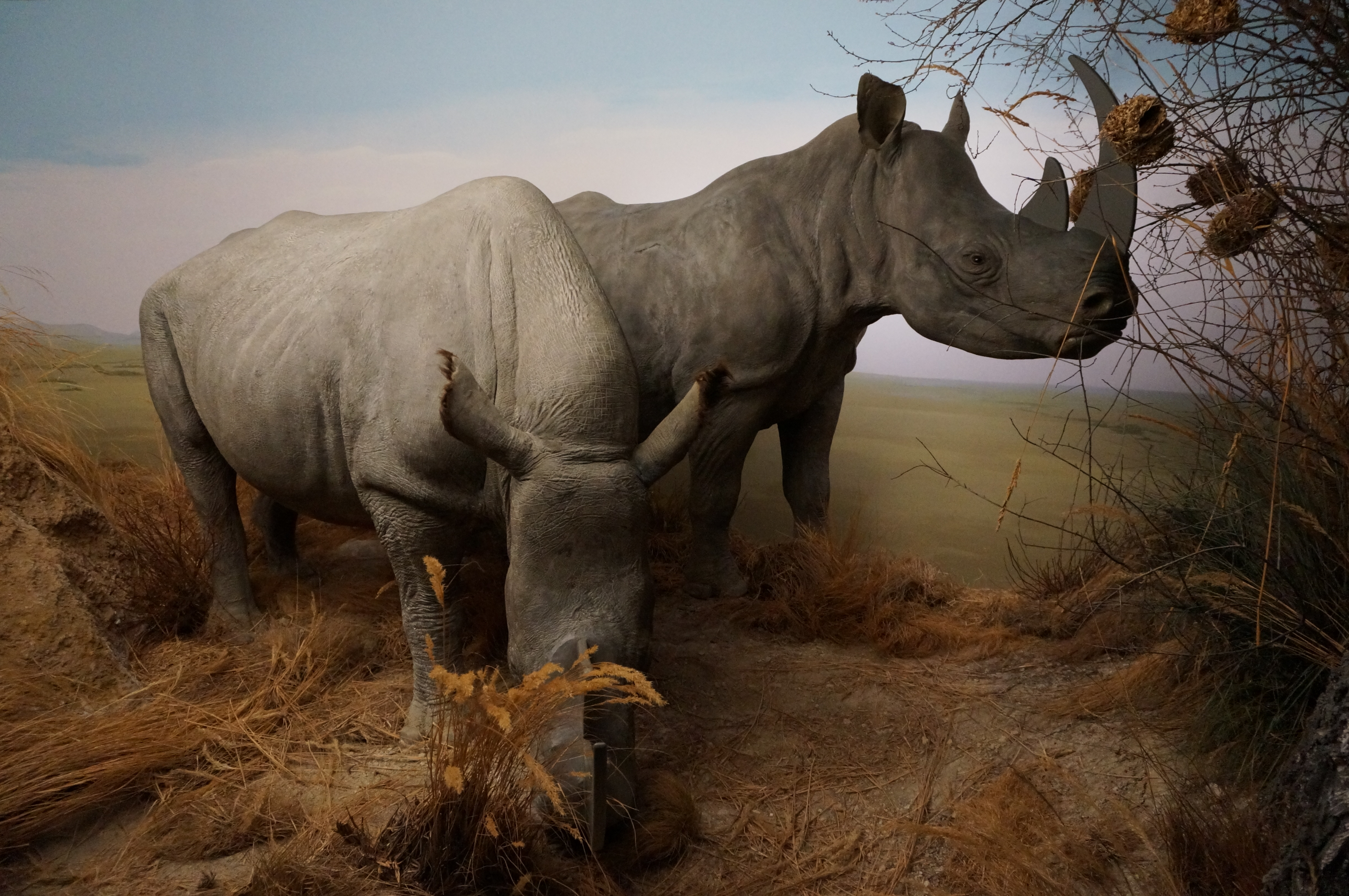
NHMB: northern white rhinoceros, left, with artificial horn, collected by Vivienne de Watteville in north-west Uganda, December 1924; southern white rhino, right, with artificial horn

== Speak to the Earth (1935) ==
Before, I had gone out as a stranger, knowing nothing of what Africa held in store for me; now, I was returning because I was under the spell; for Africa had taught me that only in primitive vastnesses can one find oneself and grasp the meaning of the word Unity.

— Vivienne de Watteville

=== Part I ===
In 1928–29 Vivienne returned to Kenya for seven months, officially to photograph and film elephants, but on a personal level to seek solitude Thoreau-style and fulfil a personal dream of going into the wilds unarmed and "in some unforeseen way to win the friendship of the beasts." "Now I was going back in my own way," she noted pointedly. After overcoming official resistance – she was by then a minor celebrity in the Colony and an aristocratic beauty in demand socially – she spent five months camping in the Maasai Game Reserve on the border with Tanganyika, alone but for five porters from the 1923-4 expedition, her Irish Terrier Siki, her books, gramophone and collection of classical records, and an armed askari (the colonial officials were taking no chances). "Around me the plains ran out to the far mountains melting into the night, and above all, like an invisible presence, Kilimanjaro drew a faint gleam of snow under the first stars." Despite bouts of malaria she mostly achieved her aims: she was tolerated by the elephants, and her chosen camp-site near Namanga turned out to be rhino grazing-ground, with the rhinos returning to graze around the tents. She narrowly escaped death in a close encounter with a lion (thinking the visitor one night was a hyaena, she left her tent to chase it off, realising her mistake too late to retreat: she was so close to the lion she could have touched it), and twice with charging rhinos that missed her by inches; she climbed two mountains (Ol Doinyo Orok and Longido); and she killed no animals except, at the request of the local Maasai, a man-eating lioness, shot by her askari.

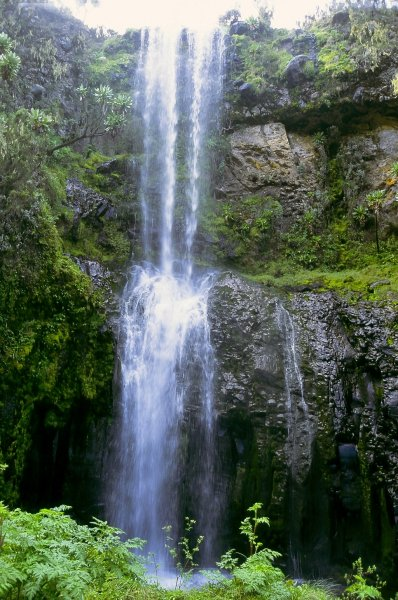
Nithi Falls near Urumandi, Mount Kenya

=== Part II ===
She then spent an idyllic two months (January–February 1929) based in Urumandi Hut on Mount Kenya (see Mountaineering on Mount Kenya), in the giant heather and parkland zone, some of the time with two porters and some alone, exploring the mountain and valleys, bathing naked in the rock-pools below the Nithi Falls, befriending the birds and small animals, collecting flowers and seeds, sketching the flora, and meditating "first principles". While up at the peaks she witnessed the third ascent of Mount Kenya, by Eric Shipton, Percy Wyn-Harris and Gustav Sommerfelt (January 1929), who next day took her on a scramble around the south-face glaciers. She thanked them on their return to Urumandi Hut with perfectly mixed cocktails. In her last weeks on the mountain she and the porters saved the alpine hut from a wildfire after a day-long struggle. Suffering toothache a few days later, rather than cut short her stay and return to Nairobi, Vivienne pulled out the tooth herself in an operation that took three hours and forty minutes, using first fishing-wire and gravity, then pliers from her tool kit.

This second journey to Africa resulted in her book Speak to the Earth: Wanderings among Elephants and Mountains, published in 1935. It contains a Preface by Edith Wharton, who admired Out in the Blue and who asked Vivienne to write another book about Africa not centred on hunting. Its epigraph, "Speak to the earth, and it shall teach thee" [Job 12,8] points to the book's gentle didacticism, touching as it does on existential questions relating to the human spirit, self-knowledge, solitude, risk-taking, Nature and happiness. "In the Conradian undertones," writes Béatrice Bijon (2009), "her narrative proves to be an exploration of the self." Shortly after the book's publication, the unnamed 80m waterfall below Lake Michaelson high up the Gorges Valley on Mount Kenya were named the 'Vivienne Falls' in the author's honour.

The world is full of hundreds of beautiful things we can never possibly have time to discover, and there is no time to be unkind or envious or ungenerous, and no sense in enslaving the mind to the trivialities of the moment. For you can be equal to the greatness of life only by marching with it; not by seeking love but by giving it, not seeking to be understood but learning to understand. And when it is all over, there will be an agony of remorse because one spared the effort and did not make more of that little span of opportunity; and knowing reality at last, who knows but that one will look back with unassuageable regret upon one's pitiful little faith.

— Vivienne de Watteville

=== Publishing history ===
Among English reprints of Speak to the Earth was a Penguin edition (1988) with an introduction by Alexander Maitland, biographer of Wilfred Thesiger. A French edition appeared in 1936 as L'appel de l'Afrique, the two parts of which have since been republished separately as Un thé chez les éléphants and Petite musique de chambre sur le mont Kenya (1997). Part 1 has been translated into Italian as Sulle orme degli elefanti (2013) (:'On the trail of the elephants'). A German translation of Speak to the Earth was published in 2019 as Allein und frei: Rückkehr nach Kenia (:'Alone and free: return to Kenya').

== Seeds that the Wind may bring (1965) ==
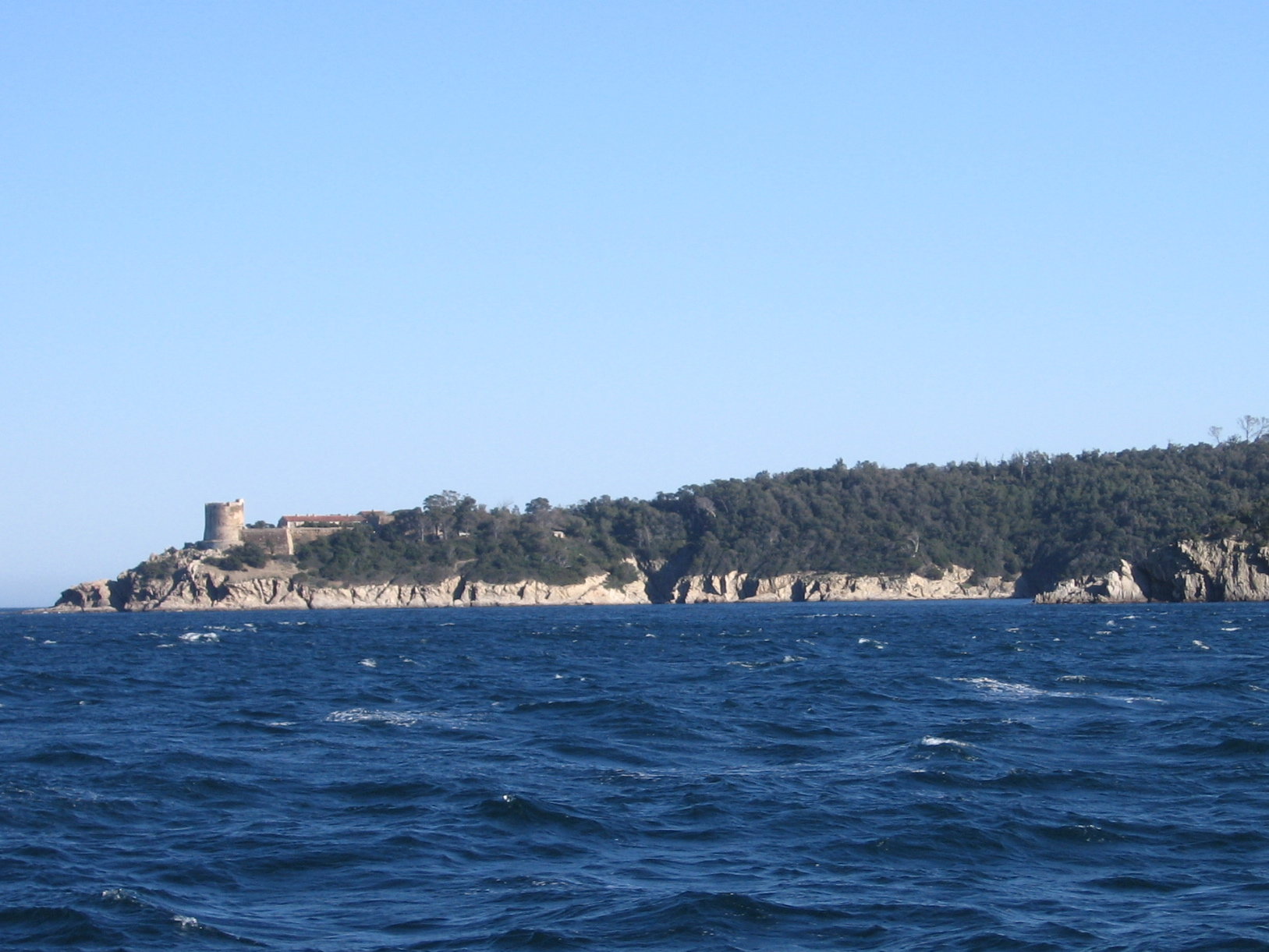
The fort at Port Man, Ile de Port-Cros, where Vivienne and Bunt play hide-and-seek during their courtship.

Travelling in the South of France in June 1929, as she recalled in her third and final book, Vivienne chanced to visit with her Swiss grandmother, Blanche Eleonore de Gingins (an unfailing supporter of her adventurous approach to life), the Ile de Port-Cros, one of the Îles d'Hyères on the Côte d'Azur. Enchanted by the unspoilt island, she conceived the idea of settling in a remote gîte there and making it "a rest-home for world-weary friends". She rented a house in the bay of Port Man, ordered alterations and, shopping recklessly in Paris in August (having then come into a legacy), furnished it to perfection. Things at first went to plan, though she was cheated and brow-beaten by all around her ("Bleak is the battle of the lone woman in Latin countries," she notes). She observed, detached, the failing relationships of her guests but her idyll turned to nightmare when alone during the wind-tormented winter months, she found to her horror that her only servant, a full-blooded young Italian called Josef, had developed a passion for her. Josef was driven to frenzies of jealousy by the visits of a cultivated Englishman, Bunt; and in a dramatic climax reminiscent of a D. H. Lawrence plot, though with an un-Lawrentian outcome, (Note: Josef was the "Giuseppe" assigned to D. H. and Frieda Lawrence as manservant on their visit to Port-Cros in October 1928, a few months before Vivienne's arrival [Collected Letters of D. H. Lawrence, ed. Harry T. Moore (London 1962), p.1095]) Vivienne, "like one waking from the dead", was forced to confront her psychological demons: her "freedom-complex" ("it was my own will to be free that had bound me hand and foot" ... "the battle within raged between this devil's pride and the other voice which pleaded for the self's surrender"); the ambivalent ties that bind her to her father's memory; delayed trauma from her father's death; fear of "saddling [herself] with the wrong companion for the rest of [her] life"; extreme perfectionism. In the book that she wrote about this Port-Cros adventure, Seeds that the Wind may bring, we find a travel-writer confronting with honest self-examination the question 'What am I doing here?'. Vivienne's third book thus becomes an ironic and mature comment on her second, which itself was a comment on her first. It is also, in its latter pages, a love-story, about "the heaven-sent gift of two people of perfect understanding". Bunt (Captain George Gerard Goschen, soldier, diplomat), a stranger she had met at an Albert Hall concert and who visits her on the island, shares her love of solitude and beauty, music and games, helps save her from the unhappy Josef, and at the end becomes her fiancé.

=== Publishing history ===
Seeds was written in England during Second World War and published posthumously by Methuen in 1965, Vivienne not having found a publisher for it during her lifetime. An illustrated French translation of Seeds by Constance Lacroix was published in 2019 as Une Île sans pareille: Souvenirs de Port-Cros 1929-1930.

== Later life ==
On 23 July 1930 Vivienne de Watteville married Captain George Gerard Goschen (1887–1953). They had two children, David Bernard (born 1931), and Tana Mary (born 1932), named after the river Tana in Kenya. "Nothing short of bearing and rearing children myself," de Watteville wrote, "coming down with humility into the struggling world, could have taught me the greatness of women." After her marriage she gave talks on the BBC wireless and published articles. Among her friends was Karen Blixen, who described her as a witty conversationalist. (Denys Finch Hatton had advised Vivienne on her 1928 itinerary.) When the success of Speak to the Earth called for a new edition of Out in the Blue in 1937, she considered, as she notes in the Preface, rewriting her first book to play down the hunting scenes, given changing attitudes to big-game hunting in the 1930s, and to bring the book into line with her own maturer outlook; but she resisted the temptation in the interests of historical truth.

Vivienne and George Goschen lived at Wild Acre near Farnham, Surrey, 1932-1934, then King's Farm, Binsted, Hampshire, then Coneybury, near Ardingly, Sussex. Vivienne inherited her aunt's house at Hopesay, Shropshire. After the War, they made only one long-distance journey, to Alaska. George Goschen died on 29 April 1953, aged 66. Vivienne died in hospital on 27 June 1957, aged 56, of cancer. "When told that she had no more than a fortnight to live," J. Alan White wrote, "she received the news with relief, and even a kind of exaltation, that the pain and uncertainty from which she had suffered for a number of years were about to end. She saw no reason for deep grief; she was 56 and had had a satisfying life. The few pain-free hours in the last two weeks of her life were devoted to the clearing up of her affairs." She left her eyes to the Eye Bank, and the manuscript of her third book to a friend, J. Alan White, asking him to oversee its publication. Vivienne and George Goschen were buried at Hopesay, Shropshire, which had been the home of her English grandfather, Captain H. W. Beddoes, R.N.

== Influence ==
Among writers influenced by de Watteville's two African books was Ernest Hemingway, who originally included a quotation from Speak to the Earth as an epigraph to his 1936 story 'The Snows of Kilimanjaro'. Part I of Speak to the Earth ends, like 'Snows', with a vision of Kilimanjaro after rain, and with a sense of its sunlit snows as the next destination.
