= Namanga (disambiguation) =

Namanga may refer to:

- Namanga, a town in Kajiado district, Kenya
- Namanga Hills, a mountain in southern Kenya
- Namanga (Tanzanian ward), a ward in Longido district, Arusha region, Tanzania
