= Conservatoire botanique national méditerranéen de Porquerolles =

Conservatory and garden in France

Coordinates: 42.9968°N 6.1959°E

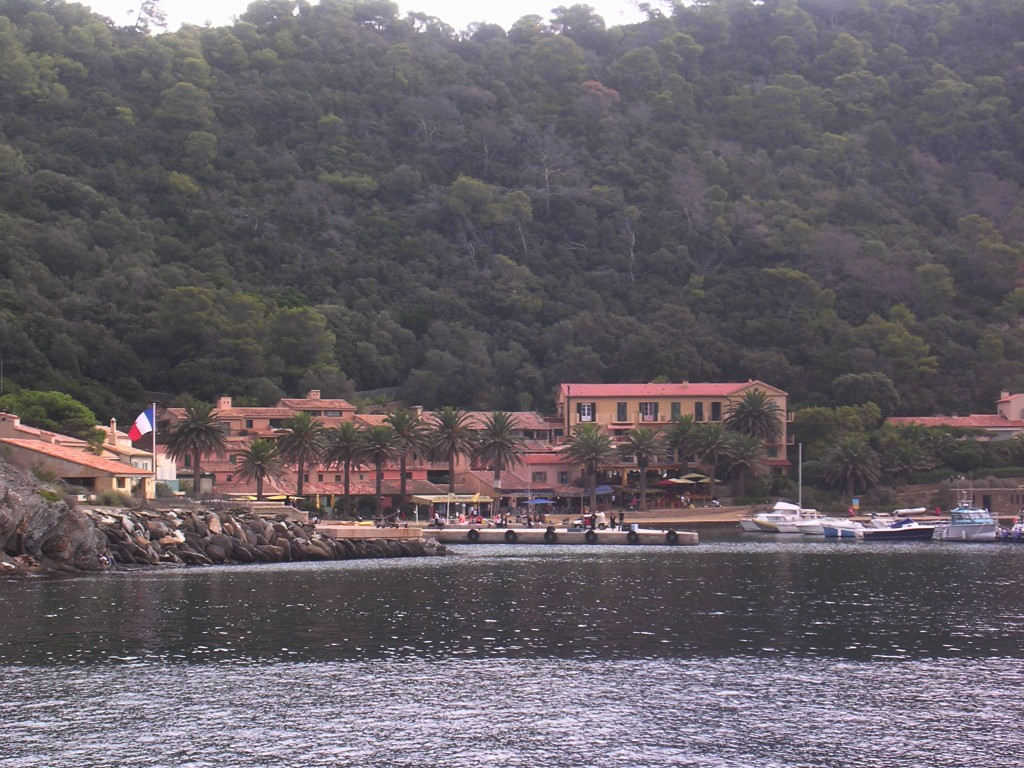
Conservatoire botanique national méditerranéen de Porquerolles

The Conservatoire botanique national méditerranéen de Porquerolles (180 hectares) is a national conservatory and botanical garden located within the Parc National de Port-Cros on Porquerolles in the Îles d'Hyères, Var, Provence-Alpes-Côte d'Azur, France.

Active conservation on Porquerolles began in 1971 when the state bought 80% of the island to protect it from development. The conservatory itself was founded in 1979 and became a Conservatoire botanique national in 1990 to serve the French Mediterranean regions of Languedoc-Roussillon, Provence, and the Côte d'Azur.

Today the conservatory manages 180 hectares of agricultural land, as well as three vineyards, and preserves several collections of rare varieties of olive trees (more than 500 trees), fruit trees including stone fruit and citruses, mulberry, fig trees, and palm trees, with a particular emphasis on heritage varieties that serve as a gene reserve. It also conserves some 2,000 plant genes in its seed bank.

== See also ==
- List of botanical gardens in France
