= The Mahé Circle =

1946 novel by Georges Simenon

- Author: Georges Simenon
- Language: French
- Published: 1946
- Publisher: Éditions Gallimard
- Publication place: Belgium

Le Cercle des Mahé (1946), translated as The Mahé Circle, is a novel by Belgian writer Georges Simenon; it is one of the author's self-described roman durs or "hard novels" to distinguish it from his romans populaires or "popular novels," which are primarily mysteries that usually feature his famous Inspector Maigret character.

The book is divided into eight chapters: "The Doctor versus the Péqouis," "The Legionnaire's Return," "The Garden Gate," "Elisabeth's Fall," "Péchade's Letter," "The Burial at Saint-Hilaire," "A Visit to the Ramparts," and "Victory to the Péqouis," and is written using the third person narrative mode.

Le Cercle des Mahé has been translated into English by Siân Reynold for Penguin Classics in 2014.

== Composition ==
Simenon considered titling the novel Le docteur dans l'ìle or Le docteur aux Gobis before settling on Le Cercle des Mahé. The novel was written at his home in Saint-Mesmin-le-Vieux, and was completed on 10 May 1945.

== Plot summary ==
Dr. François Mahé, on vacation on the island of Porquerolles with his wife and children, has to interrupt an unsuccessful fishing trip to visit a dying woman. When he arrives at her home, the woman is already dead, her husband Frans Klamm has left for a trip to Toulon, and her three children, thin, dirty, and neglected, are alone. The family is held in low regard by the islanders, and the Doctor is disturbed by the family's misery. But it is the eldest of the children, Elisabeth, who makes the greatest impression on him. For various reasons, the Mahé family does not enjoy their time at Porquerolles, and yet despite this, the following year the Doctor arranges another family vacation on the island.

In their third year, the Mahés bring their nineteen-year-old nephew Fred with them. The dead woman's household has by now been taken over by Elisabeth who takes in sewing, looks after her siblings, and occasionally is able to get some money from her absentee father who does various odd jobs around the island when he is not getting drunk. Though the Doctor has never spoken to her before, he feels an obsessive attraction to Elisabeth that he cannot fully understand. He arranges for Fred to meet Elisabeth. When he learns that his nephew has made love to her, forcefully, the doctor is initially satisfied that Fred has been able to degrade her, but soon starts to resent what his nephew has done. Elisabeth, who is always seen wearing the same red dress, has haunted the Doctor for years, ever since his first visit to the island. A letter from one of his colleagues tells François that his mother is seriously ill, and the vacation is abruptly interrupted so that the family may return to their home in Saint-Hilaire.

As his mother's health declines, François becomes aware of the hold that she has exerted over his entire life, how she has chosen the profession of doctor for him, even making him marry a submissive, colorless woman whom he does not love. When his mother dies, the Doctor returns yet again with his family to Porquerolles, where he tries in vain to see Elisabeth, who has left to work and live in Hyères. He buys the island doctor's practice, accepting financially ruinous terms, and settles there. Now that he has broken free of the Mahé family circle, he symbolically rejoins Elisabeth by allowing himself to drown during a solitary fishing trip, which the family believes was an accident.

== Reception ==
The Complete Review describes The Mahé Circle as "terribly, wonderfully dark," and gives it a grade of "A-." Writing for The Guardian, John Gray describes the book as "one of Georges Simenon’s most powerful roman durs . . . [w]ritten in Simenon’s spare signature style, it’s unputdownably gripping." John Banville includes the book on his list of "Top Five Georges Simenon Novels," and describes it as "Enigmatic, brooding, and wholly convincing." In the Glasgow Review of Books Graeme Macrae Burnet writes "the mosaic of [Simenon's] romans durs does indeed form a coherent body of work, one with characteristic preoccupations of alienation and the desire to break out of an inauthentic existence. The Mahé Circle is not Simenon’s finest book, but it is a valuable and fascinating piece of the mosaic."
