= Port-Cros =

French island in the Mediterranean Sea

Coordinates: 43.001219°N 6.395372°E

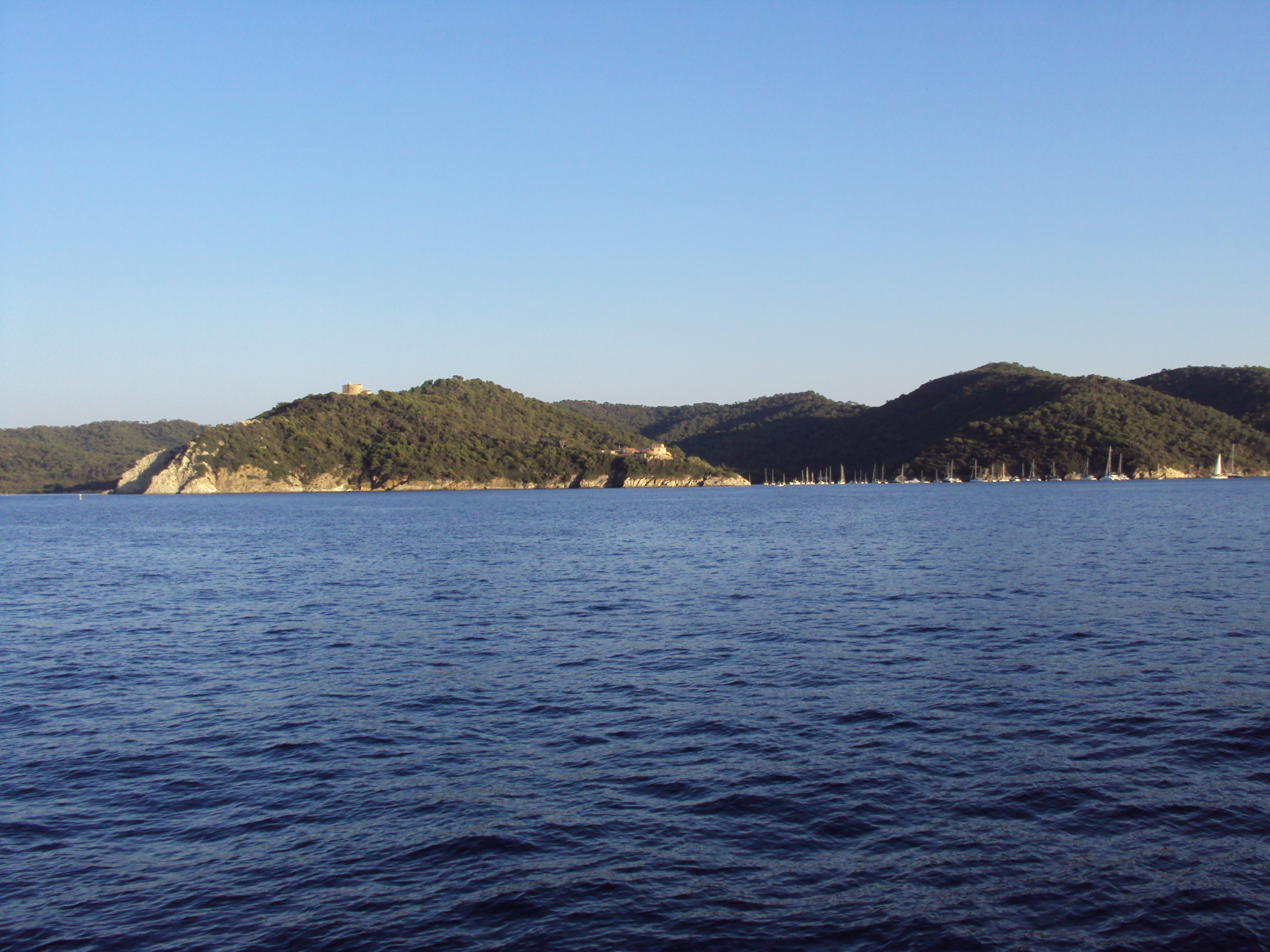
West coast of Port-Cros

Port-Cros (French pronunciation: [pɔʁ kʁo]) is a French island in the Mediterranean island group known as the Îles d'Hyères. It is part of the commune of Hyères, in the department of Var in the region of Provence-Alpes-Côte d'Azur. The island was donated to the French government with the promise that a national park, the Port-Cros National Park, would be created on the island. This was established on 14 December 1963. The island is 4 km (2 mi) wide and its most elevated point is 199 m (653 ft). It is 650 hectares (1,600 acres).

== History ==
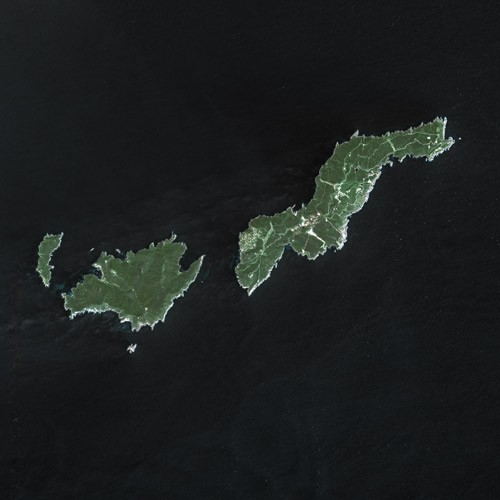
SPOT satellite image showing, from left to right: Île du Bagaud, Port-Cros, and Île du Levant. The very small isle at the south of Port-Cros is La Gabinière

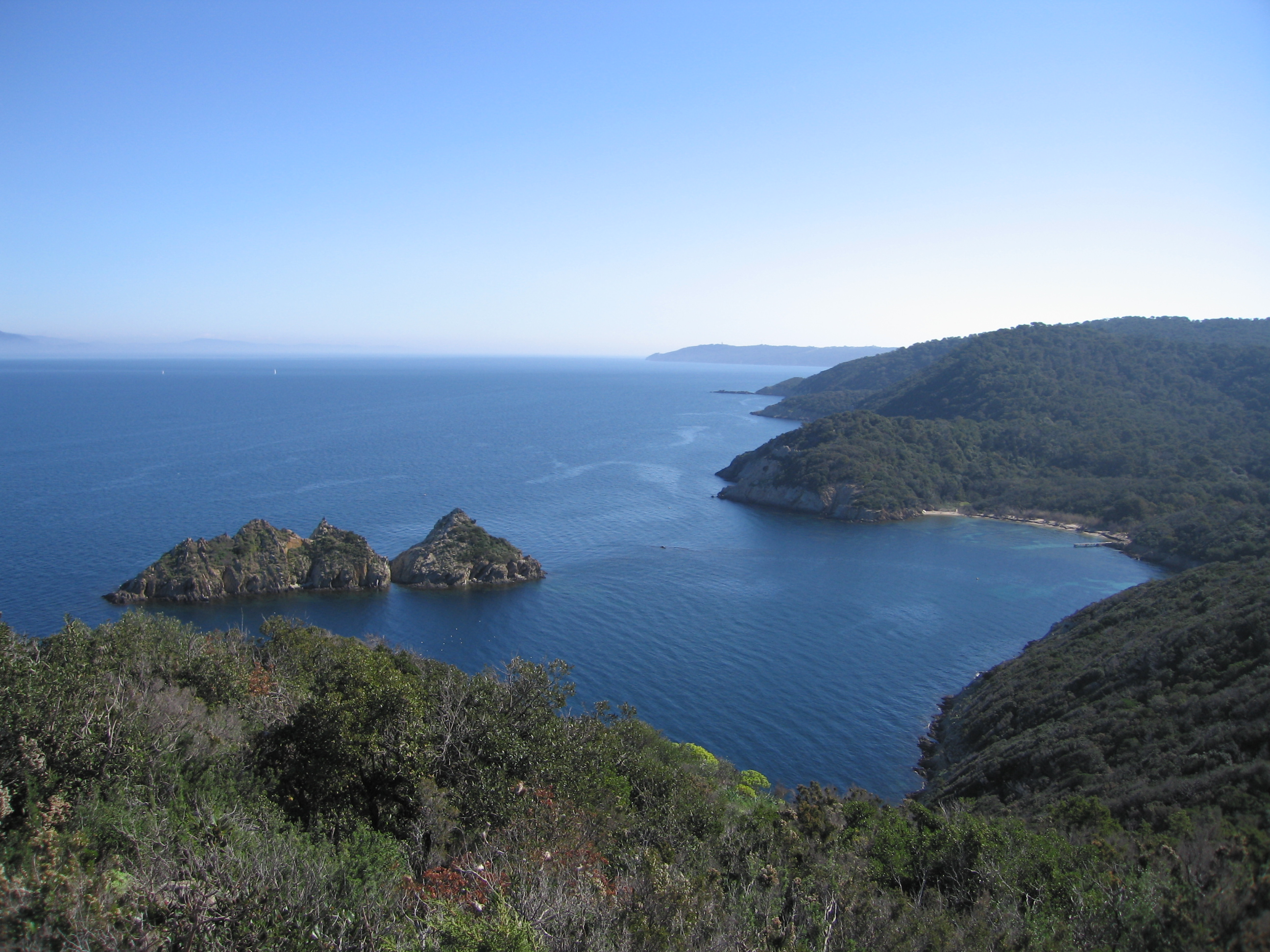
Beach of La Palud and the rocks of Rascas

The island was known as Messea (Middle Island) to the ancient Greeks. Its present name derives from the small port on the island, which is cross-shaped. Roman tombs on the island indicate that there may have been a Roman colony on the island, and coins and canals of Roman origin have also been found on the island. In the 5th century, the monastery of Lérins established a branch on Île du Levant. This foundation on Île du Levant established a branch on Port-Cros in the small valley of Notre-Dame. The monastery on Port-Cros was destroyed by Barbary pirates, who repeatedly attacked the Hyères Islands from the 10th to the 16th centuries.

In 1531, François I of France visited the Hyères, and as a result of being informed by inhabitants of the pirate attacks, charged Bertrand d'Ornesan with the task of constructing fortifications on the islands to defend them against pirates. He elevated the three islands to the status of a marquisate on 13 February 1532. In 1549, this marquisate passed to Christophe de Rocquendorf. To attract colonists, he granted asylum to common law criminals, but these caused as much disorder as the pirates they were meant to be a shield against. In 1617, the promised fortifications had not yet been built, but under the direction of Cardinal Richelieu, construction began with the building of the Tour de l'Éminence, the fort of l'Estissac and the fort at Port-Man. Louis XIV of France fought against piracy in the region, but the lack of a substantial garrison caused the British to plunder Port-Cros in 1700 and to invade in 1742 before being driven out by the Jean-Frédéric Phélypeaux, Count of Maurepas.

The last marquis of the islands was Louis de Colvet, Mirabeau's father-in-law. Colvet sold the islands to Jean Joseph Barthélémy Simon de Savornin in 1783. In 1793, the British attacked Port-Cros again. Napoleon restored the defenses in 1811 and installed a garrison of veterans. After the fall of the First French Empire, the garrison was replaced by a company of crippled soldiers. The marquisate was purchased by the French state in 1815, and changed hands a number of times before being sold to a Dr. Crotte, who tried to develop the island into a tourist resort. Some facilities for tourists, including a hotel, were built when the island was acquired by Marcel Henry and Claude Balyne. During the interwar period, the island was visited by numerous figures of the artistic and literary world: Jean Paulhan, André Malraux, André Gide, Saint-John Perse, Paul Valéry, D. H. Lawrence, and Jules Supervielle. Vivienne de Watteville lived there from 1929, and wrote a book about her first year on the island, Seeds that the Wind may bring.

During World War II, during the Allied invasion of Provence, the Battle of Port Cros took place on the island on 15 August 1944, in which the German garrison of 150 men fought against a force of American and Canadian commandos, known as the Devil's Brigade. The island was captured by the Allies on 17 August 1944.

When Madame Henry, the owner of the island, died in 1966, she bequeathed the island to the state, with the exception of the hotel Le Manoir, which her great-nephew, Pierre Buffet, inherited. The Port-Cros National Park was created in 1963. The photographer Yann Arthus-Bertrand is working on the restoration of the fort at Port-Man.
