= Hyères =

Hyères Ieras (Occitan)
- Commune
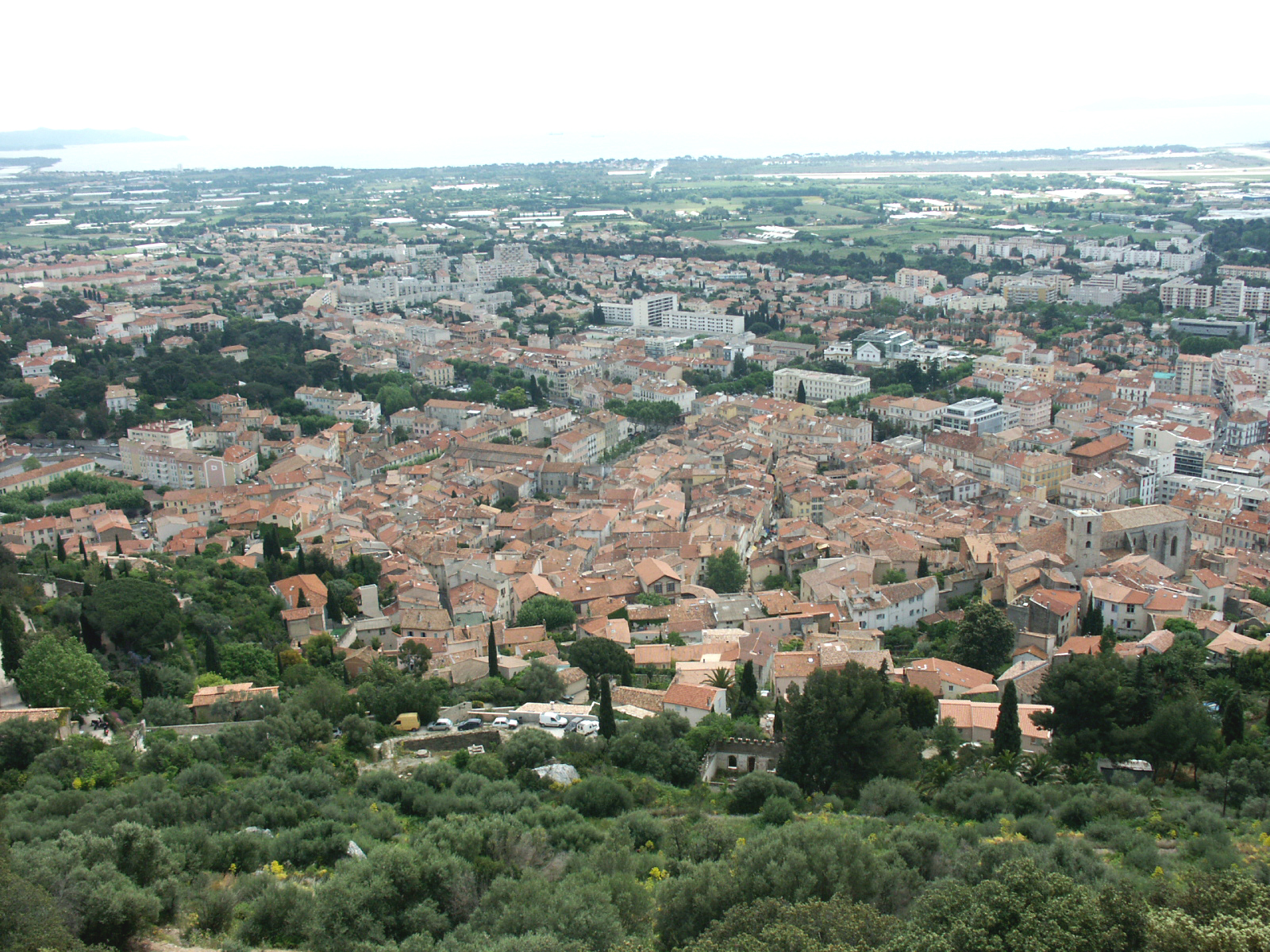
- A hillside view of the town

- Coat of arms
- Location of Hyères
- Location within France Location within Provence-Alpes-Côte d'Azur
- Coordinates: 43°07′12″N 6°07′54″E
- Country: France
- Region: Provence-Alpes-Côte d'Azur
- Department: Var
- Arrondissement: Toulon
- Canton: Hyères and La Crau
- Intercommunality: Métropole Toulon Provence Méditerranée

Government
  - Mayor (2020–2026): Jean-Pierre Giran
- Area^{1}: 132.28 km^{2} (51.07 sq mi)
- Highest elevation: 325 m (1,066 ft)
- Lowest elevation: 0 m (0 ft)
- Population (2023): 55,858
  - Density: 422.27/km^{2} (1,093.7/sq mi)
- Time zone: UTC+01:00 (CET)
  - Summer (DST): UTC+02:00 (CEST)
- INSEE/Postal code: 83069 /83400
- ^{1} French Land Register data, which excludes lakes, ponds, glaciers > 1 km^{2} (0.386 sq mi or 247 acres) and river estuaries.

Hyères (French pronunciation: [jɛʁ]), Provençal Occitan: Ieras in classical norm, or Iero in Mistralian norm) is a commune in the Var department in the Provence-Alpes-Côte d'Azur region in southeastern France.

The old town lies 4 km (2.5 mi) from the sea clustered around the Castle of Saint Bernard, which is set on a hill. Between the old town and the sea lies the pine-covered hill of Costebelle, which overlooks the peninsula of Giens. Hyères is the oldest resort on the French Riviera.

== History ==
=== Hellenic Olbia ===
The Hellenic city of Olbia (Ancient Greek: Ὀλβία) was refounded on the Phoenician settlement that dated to the fourth century BC; Olbia is mentioned by the geographer Strabo (IV.1.5) as a city of the Massiliotes that was fortified "against the tribe of the Salyes and against those Ligures who live in the Alps". Greek and Roman antiquities have been found in the area.

=== Middle Ages ===
The first reference to the town Hyères dates from 963. Originally a possession of the Viscount of Marseille, it was later transferred to Charles of Anjou. Louis IX King of France (often known as "St Louis") landed at Hyères in 1254 when returning from the crusades.

A commandry of the Knights Templar was based at the town in the 12th century, outside the town walls. The remaining remnant is the tower Saint-Blaise.

=== 19th and 20th centuries ===
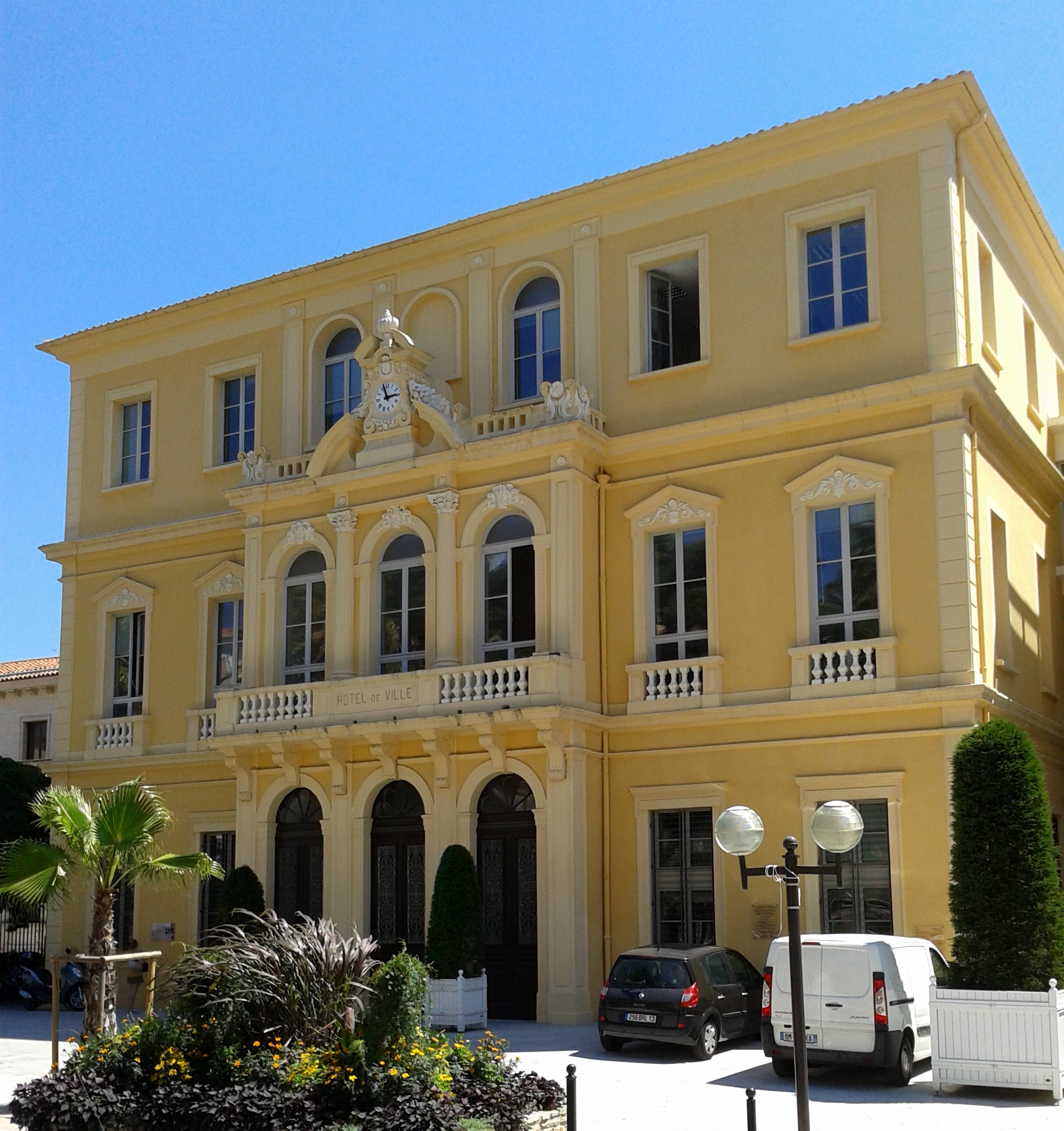
The Hôtel de Ville

The Hôtel de Ville was completed in 1864.

After defecting from Soviet intelligence in 1937, Walter Krivitsky hid in Hyères (one of the farthest points in France from his operational base in Paris).

=== World War II ===
As part of Operation Dragoon on 15 August 1944, the First Special Service Force came ashore off the coast of Hyères to take the islands of Port-Cros and Levant. The small German garrisons offered little resistance and the whole eastern part of Port-Cros was secured by 06:30. All fighting was over on Levant by the evening, but, on Port-Cros, the Germans withdrew into old thick-walled forts. It was only when naval guns were brought to bear that they realised that further resistance was useless.

An intense naval barrage on 18 August 1944 heralded the next phase of the operation—the assault on the largest of the Hyères islands, Porquerolles. French forces—naval units and colonial formations, including Senegalese infantry—became involved on 22 August and subsequently occupied the island. A US–Canadian Special Forces landing at the eastern end of Porquerolles took large numbers of prisoners, the Germans preferring not to surrender to the Senegalese.

== Geography ==
Its position facing the Mediterranean to the south makes it popular with tourists in the winter and makes it ideal for the cultivation of palm trees. As a result, the town is frequently referred to as Hyères-les-Palmiers (palmiers meaning palm trees).

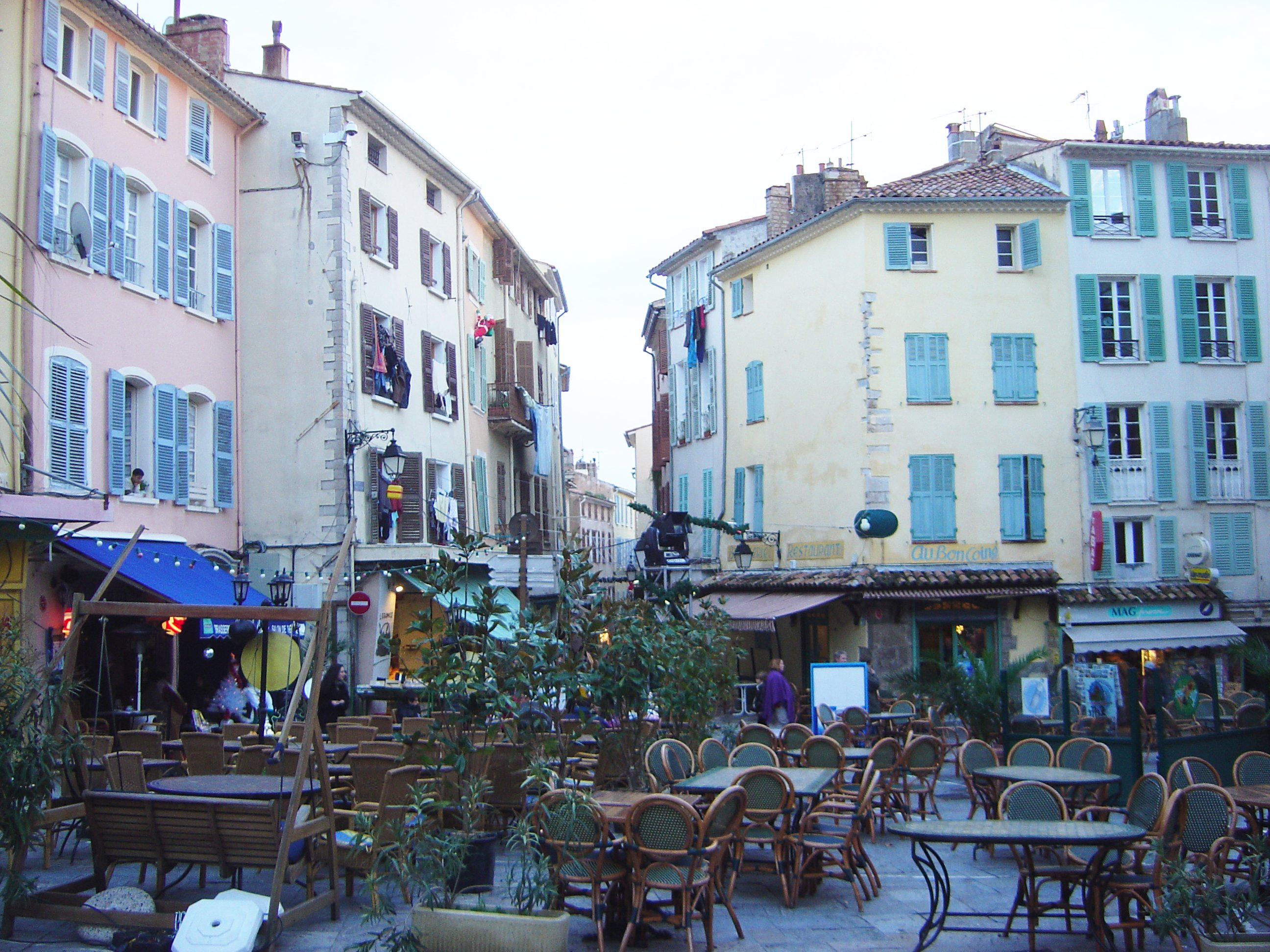
Place Massillon, Hyères

The three islands of the Îles d'Hyères (namely, Porquerolles, Port-Cros, and the Île du Levant) are just offshore. Porquerolles and Port-Cros form the Port-Cros National Park.

The commune has a land area of 132.38 square kilometres (51.11 sq mi).

=== Climate ===
The city of Hyères has a hot-summer Mediterranean climate (Köppen: Csa) and it is one of the warmest cities in France. Winters are relatively mild and summers are hot, with maximum temperatures often surpassing 30 °C (86 °F). It is also one of the driest cities in France, with barely 57 rainy days per year and almost rainless summers.

Hyères is located on the Côte d'Azur and enjoys a Mediterranean climate with hot and dry summers and mild and relatively humid winters. The harbor can be subjected to strong winds, with a record set at 183.3 km/h on 3 March 1995. The mistral blows there, although the municipality is sheltered to the north by the Massif des Maures (the mistral coming from the west, and swaying to the east, south of the Rhône Valley therefore reaches it). It is sometimes exposed to the east (or "east wind") that rushes into the harbor between the island of Port-Cros and Cape Bénat but is protected dusirocco by the island of Porquerolles and the peninsula of Giens. On an annual average, the temperature stands at 15.9 °C with a maximum average of 20.1 °C and a minimum of 11.8 °C. The maximum and minimum nominal temperatures recorded are 29 °C in July–August and 6 °C in January and February, mild values thanks to the presence of the Mediterranean and the Toulon agglomeration. Frost days are quite rare but on 10 February 1986 the temperature was raised by −7.5 °C. Conversely, on 7 July 1982 a temperature of 40.1 °C set a record. The average sunshine is 2,899.3 hours per year with a peak of 373.8 hours in July. Another important value, characteristic of the Mediterranean climate, rainfall totals 665 millimeters in Hyères over the year, a relatively low value compared to other municipalities around the Mediterranean and especially the rains are very unevenly distributed with less than seven millimeters in July and nearly ninety-four millimeters in October. The record rainfall recorded in twenty-four hours was 156 millimetres on 16 January 1978; as of 15 June 2010 it now stands at 200 millimetres.

Comparison of local Meteorological data with other cities in France
Town	Sunshine (hours/yr)	Rain (mm/yr)	Snow (days/yr)	Storm (days/yr)	Fog (days/yr)
National average	1,973	770	14	22	40
Hyères	N/A	652	0.9	21.5	5.1
Paris	1,661	637	12	18	10
Nice	2,724	767	1	29	1
Strasbourg	1,693	665	29	29	56
Brest	1,605	1,211	7	12	75

Climate data for Hyères (1991–2020 averages, extremes 1959–present)
Month	Jan	Feb	Mar	Apr	May	Jun	Jul	Aug	Sep	Oct	Nov	Dec	Year
Record high °C (°F)	23.0 (73.4)	23.3 (73.9)	25.9 (78.6)	27.2 (81.0)	35.6 (96.1)	36.5 (97.7)	42.3 (108.1)	37.8 (100.0)	36.5 (97.7)	29.7 (85.5)	25.0 (77.0)	23.9 (75.0)	42.3 (108.1)
Mean daily maximum °C (°F)	13.6 (56.5)	13.8 (56.8)	16.0 (60.8)	18.1 (64.6)	21.9 (71.4)	25.8 (78.4)	28.8 (83.8)	29.0 (84.2)	25.4 (77.7)	21.4 (70.5)	17.1 (62.8)	14.3 (57.7)	20.4 (68.7)
Daily mean °C (°F)	9.2 (48.6)	9.2 (48.6)	11.3 (52.3)	13.5 (56.3)	17.1 (62.8)	20.8 (69.4)	23.4 (74.1)	23.6 (74.5)	20.5 (68.9)	17.1 (62.8)	13.0 (55.4)	10.1 (50.2)	15.7 (60.3)
Mean daily minimum °C (°F)	4.9 (40.8)	4.6 (40.3)	6.6 (43.9)	8.8 (47.8)	12.3 (54.1)	15.7 (60.3)	18.1 (64.6)	18.3 (64.9)	15.5 (59.9)	12.8 (55.0)	8.8 (47.8)	5.9 (42.6)	11.0 (51.8)
Record low °C (°F)	−11.0 (12.2)	−7.1 (19.2)	−5.9 (21.4)	−0.4 (31.3)	1.0 (33.8)	6.5 (43.7)	9.9 (49.8)	8.6 (47.5)	6.0 (42.8)	2.3 (36.1)	−2.0 (28.4)	−4.9 (23.2)	−11.0 (12.2)
Average precipitation mm (inches)	73.7 (2.90)	51.2 (2.02)	44.0 (1.73)	55.2 (2.17)	39.5 (1.56)	36.6 (1.44)	7.8 (0.31)	14.4 (0.57)	57.9 (2.28)	105.1 (4.14)	108.6 (4.28)	74.8 (2.94)	668.8 (26.33)
Average precipitation days (≥ 1.0 mm)	5.7	5.0	4.6	5.7	4.1	2.8	0.9	1.6	4.5	6.8	7.8	6.1	55.6
Average snowy days	0.4	0.2	0.0	0.0	0.0	0.0	0.0	0.0	0.0	0.0	0.1	0.1	0.9
Source: Meteo France

== Population ==
Historical population

Year	Pop.	±% p.a.
1793	6,500	—
1800	6,528	+0.06%
1806	6,982	+1.13%
1821	7,617	+0.58%
1831	10,142	+2.90%
1836	8,880	−2.62%
1841	9,966	+2.33%
1846	10,116	+0.30%
1851	9,999	−0.23%
1856	9,446	−1.13%
1861	10,368	+1.88%
1866	10,878	+0.96%
1872	11,212	+0.51%
1876	12,289	+2.32%
1881	13,849	+2.42%
1886	13,485	−0.53%
1891	14,982	+2.13%
1896	17,708	+3.40%
1901	17,659	−0.06%

Year	Pop.	±% p.a.
1906	17,790	+0.15%
1911	21,339	+3.70%
1921	17,476	−1.98%
1926	19,816	+2.55%
1931	22,967	+3.00%
1936	26,378	+2.81%
1946	23,654	−1.08%
1954	29,061	+2.61%
1962	28,505	−0.24%
1968	34,875	+3.42%
1975	36,123	+0.50%
1982	38,999	+1.10%
1990	48,043	+2.64%
1999	51,417	+0.76%
2007	54,888	+0.82%
2012	55,402	+0.19%
2017	55,588	+0.07%
2023	55,858	+0.08%

Source: EHESS and INSEE (1968–2023)

== British and Americans in Hyères, 18th to early 20th centuries ==
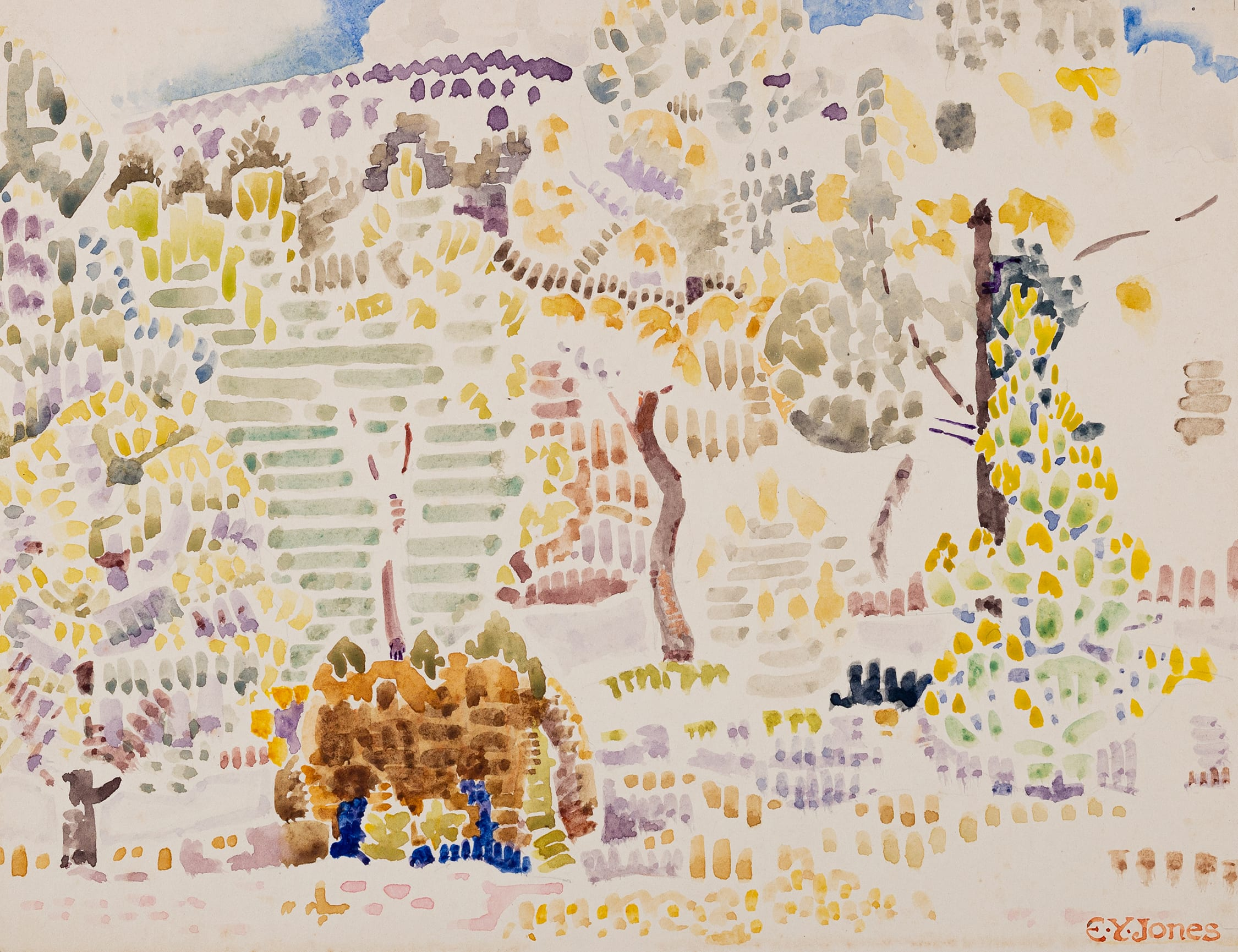
Orchard at Bormes-les-Mimosas, Hyeres, by Ernest Yarrow Jones (c. 1910

Lord Albemarle, the British ambassador, stayed in Hyères during the winter 1767–1768, and Prince Augustus, sixth son of George III, stayed there in the winter of 1788 for health reasons. The English agronomist Arthur Young visited Hyères on the advice of Lady Craven on 10 September 1789. He mentioned the many British living there in his book Travels in France. The London-born and Eton-educated Anglo-Grison Charles de Salis died in Hyères in July 1781, aged 45, and was buried in the Convent des Cordeliers.

In 1791, Charlotte Turner Smith published her novel Celestina, which is set in Hyères. During the period of the French Revolution and the Napoleonic Wars, the British left the area, but they returned after 1815. Joseph Conrad, who lived for a while in Hyères, wrote his novel The Rover, which is set in Hyères, during those years.

William FitzRoy, 6th Duke of Grafton, spent the winter and spring each year at Hyères because he and his wife suffered from ill health. Edwin Lee M.D. published in 1857 a book on the virtues of the climate of Hyères for the recovery of pulmonary consumption and in November 1880 Adolphe Smith first published The Garden of Hyères, which is still in print, (see Hachette edition of 2012).

In 1883, Robert Louis Stevenson came to Hyères and for about two years lived first at the Grand Hotel (the building still stands in the Avenue des Iles d'Or), and then in a chalet called Solitude in the present rue Victor-Basch. He wrote then: "That spot our garden and our view are sub-celestial. I sing daily with Bunian, that great bard. I dwell next door to Heaven!" In later years, he wrote from his retreat in Valima: "Happy (said I); I was only happy once; that was at Hyères".

In 1884, Elisabeth Douglas, daughter of Alfred, Lord Douglas, had a small "cottage", as she called it, built on the Costebelle hill by the architect Thomas Donaldson, who used to spend his winters in Hyères during those years.

Lord Arthur Somerset, formerly of the Royal Horse Guards and head of the stables to the future King Edward VII fled to Europe in 1889 to escape arrest after being associated with the Cleveland Street scandal. He spent his final 37 years living with his partner in a villa in Hyères.

The British presence culminated in the winter of 1892 (21 March – 25 April) when Queen Victoria came for a stay of three weeks at the Albion Hotel. At that time, the British influence was so strong that shop signs were in both French and English. There was an English butcher, a chemist, two banks, and two golf courses. There were also two English churches (plus one at the Grand Hôtel in Costebelle), whose buildings still exist: All Saints' Church at Costebelle and Saint Paul's English Church, Avenue Beauregard.

Some signs of this English presence have vanished, like the small dell in the cemetery where there were once some hundred graves. Some of these, such as those of Lord Arthur Somerset or Richard John Meade, bore testimony to the aristocratic nature of the community. Other vestiges remain, like the fountain near the new public library in a square shaded by a plane tree. The inscription reads: "In loving memory of Marianne Stewart who died on 18 August 1900. She laboured many years in the cause of mercy to animals. Her last wish was that a drinking fountain should be set up for them in Hyères".

Many wounded British soldiers were sent to the town to convalesce during World War I.

The American novelist Edith Wharton wintered in Hyères annually from 1919 until her death in 1937. The garden of her villa, Castel Sainte-Claire, is open to the public. The villa previously belonged to Olivier Voutier, a French naval officer, whose grave is in the garden; it was Voutier who discovered the Venus de Milo in 1820 on the Aegean island of Milos.

== Transportation ==
The railway station Gare d'Hyères offers connections with Toulon, Marseille, Paris, and several regional destinations.

The airport, which is known officially as the Toulon–Hyères International Airport, is 4 km (2.5 mi) to the southeast of the town centre, on a sandy plain close to the seashore. The area was first used by private aircraft at the beginning of the 20th century. In 1920, after the marsh had been drained, French naval aircraft used the field, and, in 1925, it became an official base of the French Fleet Air Arm (Aéronavale). It has been a commercial airport since 1966, but the navy maintains a significant facility for helicopters and fixed wing aircraft within the perimeter.

There are currently (2009) scheduled flights to and from Stockholm, Bristol, Ajaccio, Paris, London, Brest, Brussels, and Rotterdam.

== People ==
Hyères was the birthplace of Jean Baptiste Massillon (1663–1742), churchman and preacher as well as Marius Gueit (1808– 1862), blind composer, organist and cellist.

The author Jean-Marie-Edmond Sabran (1908–1994), who wrote under the pseudonyms Paul Berna (children's fiction), Bernard Deleuse and Paul Gerradwas (adult fiction), and Joel Audrenn (crime novels), was born in Hyères as well as François Coupry (born 1947), winner of the 1970 edition of the Prix des Deux Magots.

The French historian Jules Michelet frequently spent the winter at Hyères. He died from a heart attack at Hyères on 9 February 1874. He was interred at Hyères. Following his widow's request, a Paris court granted permission for his body to be exhumed on 13 May 1876.

The Member of Parliament Édith Audibert was born in Hyères.

== Twin towns ==
Hyères is twinned with Rottweil, Germany and with Koekelberg, Belgium.

== Culture ==
Hyères is home to the Hyères International Fashion and Photography Festival, a huge fashion and art photography event that has taken place annually at the end of April since 1985. This festival was among the first to recognize the talents of Viktor & Rolf.

The city also plays host to the annual MIDI French Riviera Festival in July, a music festival now into its sixth episode. 2010's MIDI saw around 15 acts play at the Villa Noailles complex and brought the new 'MIDI Night' event to Almanarre Beach in the early hours of Sunday morning.

There is a football club called Hyères FC. Football stadiums include the Stade Perruc, Stade Gaby Robert and the Stade Jean Berteau, which was commissioned in 1978 and has a capacity of 600.

== See also ==
- Costebelle
- Communes of the Var department
- List of Knights Templar sites
