= Hôtel de Ville, Hyères =

Town hall in Hyères, France

Hôtel de Ville
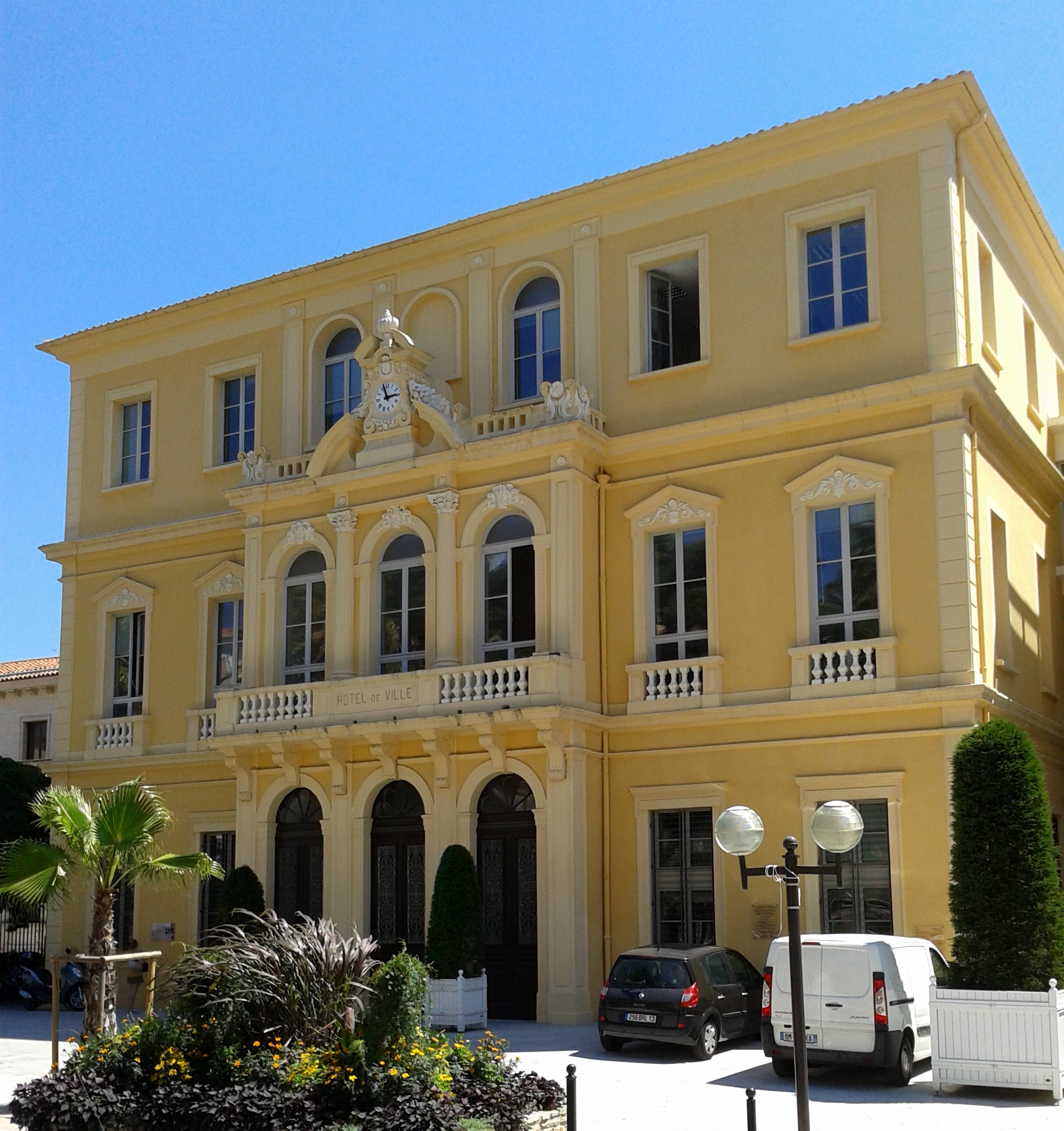
- The main frontage of the Hôtel de Ville in July 2012
- Interactive map of the Hôtel de Ville area

General information
- Type: City hall
- Architectural style: Italianate style
- Location: Hyères, France
- Coordinates: 43.1199°N 6.1302°E
- Completed: 1864

The Hôtel de Ville (French pronunciation: [otɛl də vil], City Hall) is a municipal building in Hyères, Var in southern France, standing on Avenue Joseph Clotis.

== History ==
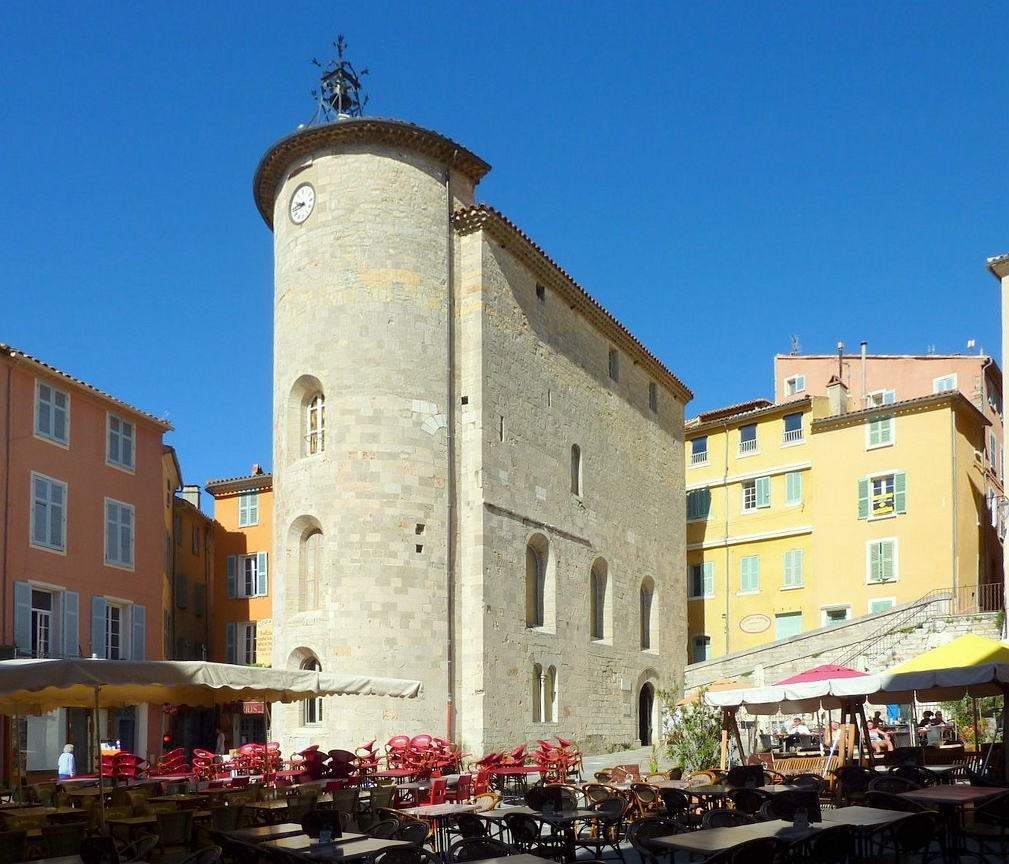
The Chapel of Saint-Blaise

The first municipal building in Hyères was the Chapel of Saint-Blaise, also known as the Tower of the Templers, which was commissioned by the Knights Templar in the 13th century. It was built in the main town square (now Place Massillon). The design involved a tall rectangular block with a semi-circular tower at the east end. There was a chapel dedicated to Saint Blaise on the ground floor and a commandery on the floor above. After the dissolution of the Knights Templar by order of the papal bull, Vox in excelso, in 1312, the building was operated by the Sovereign Military Order of Malta until 1673, when it was given to the town. Local officials converted the room above the chapel for municipal use in 1770 and, after the French Revolution, the room became the meeting place of the elected town council. A series of rounded headed windows were added to the building in 1839.

Meanwhile, with its Mediterranean climate, the town developed as tourist centre in the mid-19th century. A group of local businessmen decided to commission a small casino for tourists visiting the town in winter. The site they selected for the new casino was on the south side of Avenue de l'Impératrice (later renamed Boulevard des Palmiers and now known as Avenue Joseph Clotis).

The building was designed in the Italianate style, built in brick with a cement render finish and was completed in 1864. The design involved a symmetrical main frontage of seven bays facing onto Avenue de l'Impératrice. The central section of three bays, which was slightly projected forward, featured three round headed openings on the ground floor and three round headed windows with a balustraded balcony on the first floor. The windows on the first floor were flanked by Corinthian order pilasters supporting a frieze, a cornice and a parapet. Above the central bay, there was a segmental pediment containing a clock, which was surmounted by a smaller segmental pediment and an urn. The outer bays were fenestrated by casement windows with cornices on the ground floor and by casement windows with triangular pediments on the first floor. Although the building was also used as a minor theatrical venue, the venture was not a financial success and the building was put up for sale in 1895. The town council led by the mayor, Jean Ribier, decided to acquire the building and to convert it for municipal use in 1913.

In 1965, an extra storey was added to the building creating 15 extra rooms. A Salle du Conseil (council chamber) in the shape of a hexagon was also added behind the main building. Then, in 2008, the council acquired the old Cinema Eden, just to west of the town wall. It used the site of the former cinema, which had dated from the first quarter of the 20th century, to create a six-storey extension, and erected a recessed connecting section between the two buildings.
