= François Joseph Fournier =

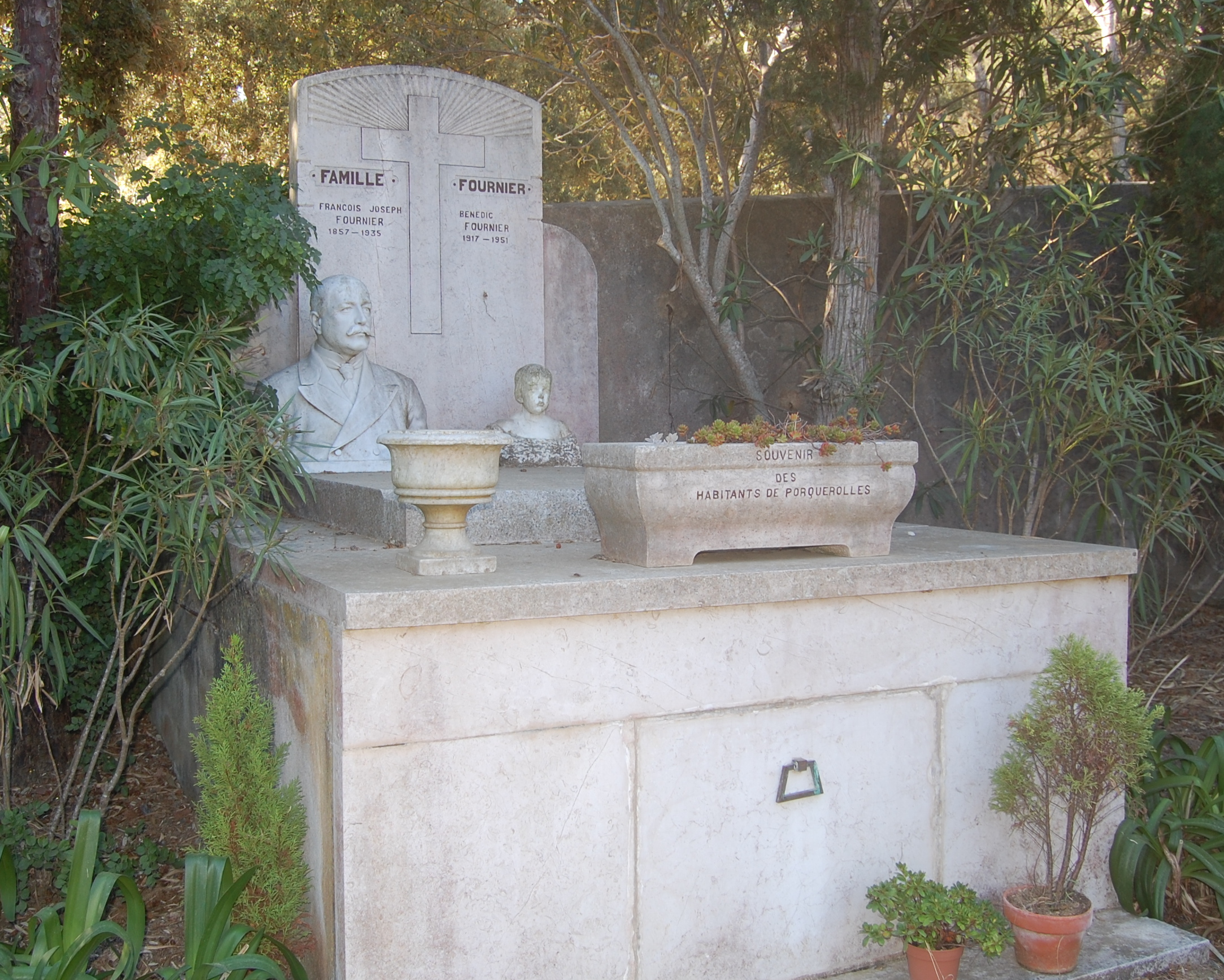
The tomb of Fournier in Porquerolles

François Joseph Fournier (6 December 1857 - 13 January 1935) was a self-taught Belgian adventurer and entrepreneur who explored Mexico and the island of Porquerolles. He was born into a family of modest means, in Clabecq, Belgium and died on Porquerolles.

Fournier purchased the entire island of Porquerolles in 1912, apparently as a wedding present for his wife. He planted 200 hectares (about 500 acres) of vineyards which produced a wine that was among the first to be classed des Côtes de Provence.

On 22 February 1912, at an auction, he bought the island of Porquerolles for the sum of one million and one hundred francs. He obtained French nationality on 28 June 1914. François Joseph Fournier developed the island of Porquerolles with the model he had used in the Colonizadora: development of wine and fruit crops, creation of a cooperative, establishment of a flotilla of boats linking with the Tour Fondue on the peninsula of Giens.

François Joseph Fournier is a graduate of the Conservatoire national des arts et métiers.

== Early life ==
Fournier was born on 6 December 1857 in Clabecq, Belgium, into a modest family; his father was a boatman who carried coal along the Sambre valley. At the age of twenty he left for Paris, where he worked a series of jobs: a delivery man at Les Halles, a worker at a mechanical firm, and a laboratory assistant at the Muséum national d'histoire naturelle.

== Mexico ==
His company sent him to the Chiapas region of Mexico to prospect for precious woods oil and gold.Not content with mining, he set up a model agricultural enterprise in the Tabasco region, the Colonizadora. According to a family account published by the Port-Cros National Park, his career also took him through Panama before Mexico. He returned to Europe having made his fortune from gold and silver mines in Mexico.

== Porquerolles ==
In 1912, the 55-year-old Fournier bought the island of Porquerolles and offered it as a wedding present to his young wife, Sylvia, who was some thirty years his junior. The island had previously belonged to the Compagnie foncière de Porquerolles, which had undertaken large works but exhausted its shareholders' funds. His home on the island was a version of a Mexican hacienda, with a flower-lined courtyard and a staff of 35.

== Bibliography ==
- Luret, William (1996). L'homme de Porquerolles (in French). Paris: Lattès. ISBN 270961636X.
- "Porquerolles". France 3, 19/20 (in French). 24 August 1996.
- "Porquerolles". France 2, MIDI 2 (in French). 13 March 1998.
