= Porquerolles =

French island in the Mediterranean Sea

Coordinates: 43°00′N 6°13′E

Topographic map of Porquerolles

Porquerolles (French pronunciation: [pɔʁkəʁɔl]; Occitan: Porcairòlas), also known as the Île de Porquerolles, is an island in the Îles d'Hyères, Var, Provence-Alpes-Côte d'Azur, France. Its land area is 1,254 hectares (12.54 km^{2}; 4.84 sq mi) and in 2004, its population was about 200.

Porquerolles is the largest and most westerly of the Îles d'Hyères, about 7 km (4.3 miles) long by 3 km (1.9 miles) wide, with five small ranges of hills. The south coast is lined with cliffs, and on the north coast are the port and the beaches of Notre Dame, La Courtade and Plage d'Argent.

== History ==
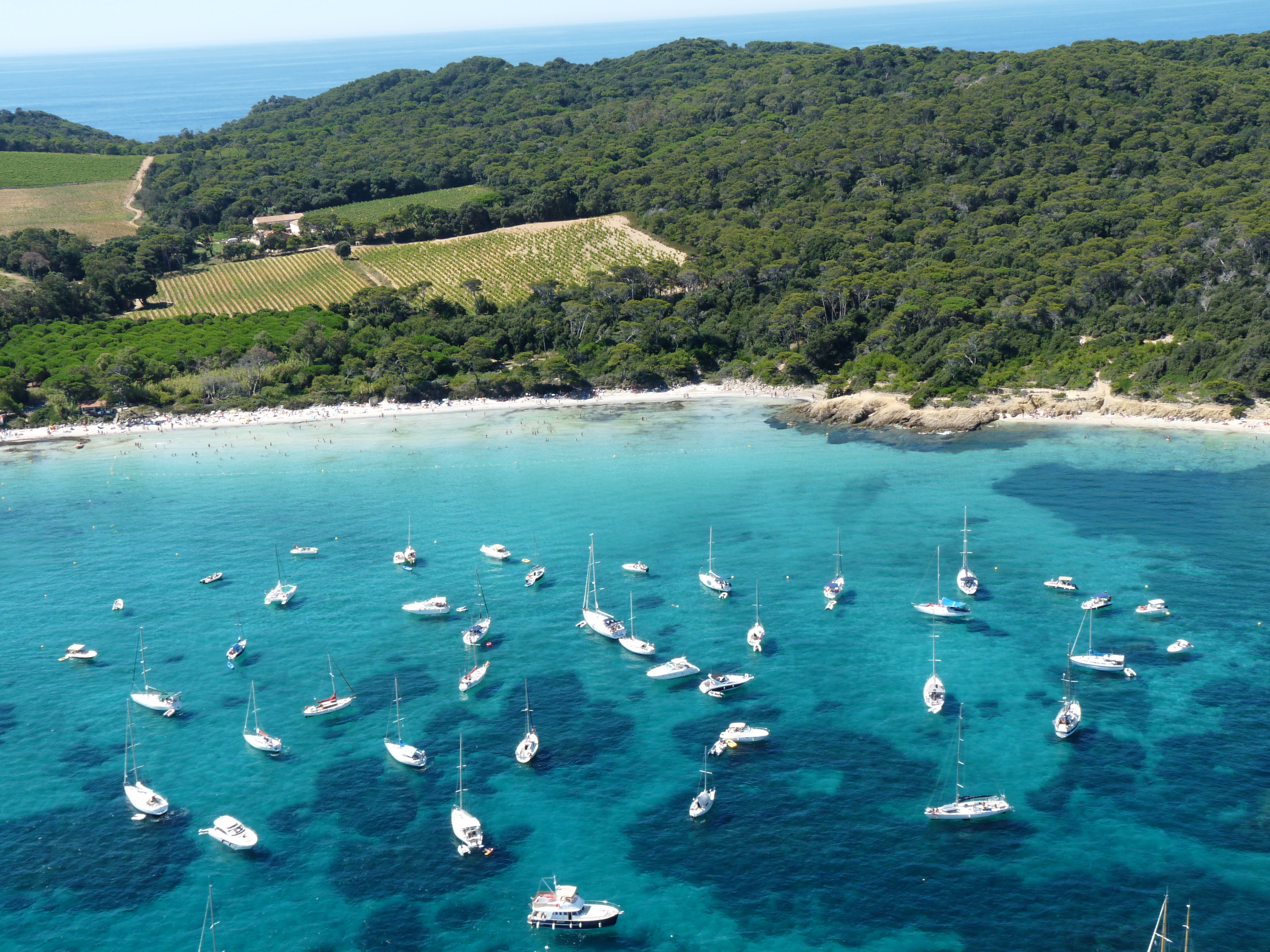
Anse de la Courtade

The island's village was established in 1820, with its lighthouse constructed in 1837 and its church in 1850. The entire island was purchased in 1912 by François Joseph Fournier, apparently as a wedding present for his wife; he planted 200 hectares (500 acres) of vineyards, which produced a wine that was among the first to be classified as vin des Côtes de Provence.

In 1971, the French government bought 80 percent of the island to preserve it from development. Much of the island is now part of the Port-Cros Parc National and the Conservatoire botanique national méditerranéen de Porquerolles nature conservation area.

Porquerolles is the setting for Georges Simenon's novels Le Cercle des Mahé (1946) and My Friend Maigret (1949), and for the 1964 novel Valparaiso by Nicolas Freeling.

Some scenes of the 1965 film Pierrot le Fou by Jean-Luc Godard were filmed in Porquerolles.

Since 2010, the island has hosted a jazz festival each summer known as "Jazz à Porquerolles".

== Climate ==
Porquerolles has a hot-summer Mediterranean climate (Köppen climate classification Csa). The average annual temperature in Porquerolles is 16.8 °C (62.2 °F). The average annual rainfall is 605.7 mm (23.85 in), with November as the wettest month. The temperatures are highest on average in August, at around 24.8 °C (76.6 °F), and lowest in February, at around 10.3 °C (50.5 °F). The highest temperature ever recorded in Porquerolles was 38.5 °C (101.3 °F) on 7 August 2003; the lowest temperature ever recorded was −10.0 °C (14.0 °F) on 2 February 1956.

Climate data for Porquerolles (1991–2020 averages, extremes 1949–present)
Month	Jan	Feb	Mar	Apr	May	Jun	Jul	Aug	Sep	Oct	Nov	Dec	Year
Record high °C (°F)	20.0 (68.0)	22.0 (71.6)	23.5 (74.3)	26.8 (80.2)	32.9 (91.2)	36.5 (97.7)	37.0 (98.6)	38.5 (101.3)	33.1 (91.6)	29.2 (84.6)	24.8 (76.6)	22.5 (72.5)	38.5 (101.3)
Mean daily maximum °C (°F)	13.2 (55.8)	13.5 (56.3)	15.9 (60.6)	18.1 (64.6)	22.0 (71.6)	26.0 (78.8)	28.7 (83.7)	29.0 (84.2)	25.5 (77.9)	21.3 (70.3)	16.7 (62.1)	13.8 (56.8)	20.3 (68.5)
Daily mean °C (°F)	10.4 (50.7)	10.3 (50.5)	12.4 (54.3)	14.5 (58.1)	18.0 (64.4)	21.8 (71.2)	24.3 (75.7)	24.8 (76.6)	21.6 (70.9)	18.0 (64.4)	13.8 (56.8)	11.1 (52.0)	16.8 (62.2)
Mean daily minimum °C (°F)	7.5 (45.5)	7.1 (44.8)	8.9 (48.0)	10.9 (51.6)	14.1 (57.4)	17.6 (63.7)	20.0 (68.0)	20.5 (68.9)	17.6 (63.7)	14.8 (58.6)	10.9 (51.6)	8.5 (47.3)	13.2 (55.8)
Record low °C (°F)	−7.0 (19.4)	−10.0 (14.0)	−5.8 (21.6)	2.0 (35.6)	6.4 (43.5)	9.0 (48.2)	10.2 (50.4)	11.5 (52.7)	9.7 (49.5)	3.5 (38.3)	−1.2 (29.8)	−2.0 (28.4)	−10.0 (14.0)
Average precipitation mm (inches)	64.1 (2.52)	48.1 (1.89)	42.1 (1.66)	56.5 (2.22)	33.8 (1.33)	28.5 (1.12)	8.4 (0.33)	15.9 (0.63)	60.5 (2.38)	85.5 (3.37)	96.0 (3.78)	66.3 (2.61)	605.7 (23.85)
Average precipitation days (≥ 1.0 mm)	6.0	5.3	4.7	5.8	4.0	2.3	0.8	1.7	4.3	6.5	7.6	6.4	55.5
Source: Meteo France

== Points of interest ==
- Conservatoire botanique national méditerranéen de Porquerolles
- Port-Cros Parc National
