= Îles d'Hyères =

French Mediterranean islands

Coordinates: 43.01°N 6.4045°E

Map of the Îles d'Hyères

The Îles d'Hyères (pronounced [il djɛːʁ]), also known as Îles d'Or ([il dɔʁ]), are a group of four Mediterranean islands off Hyères in the Var department of Southeastern France. Their old name is the Stoechades Islands from Greek: Στοιχάδες Stoikhádes from στοιχάς stoikhás meaning “in a row one behind another”.

A unique species of lavender named Lavandula stoechas was discovered here by Pedanius Dioscorides.

== Islands ==
With a combined area of 29 square kilometres (11 sq mi), the Îles d'Hyères consist of

- Porquerolles – 1,254 hectares (3,100 acres), an extension of the Giens peninsula
- Port-Cros – 650 hectares (1,600 acres), the most mountainous, part of Port-Cros National Park, noted for rare flora and as a bird refuge
- Île du Bagaud – 45 hectares (110 acres), part of the same national park, and without permitted access
- Île du Levant – 900 hectares (2,200 acres), mostly for military use, partly a long-established naturist community centered on the privately owned village of Héliopolis
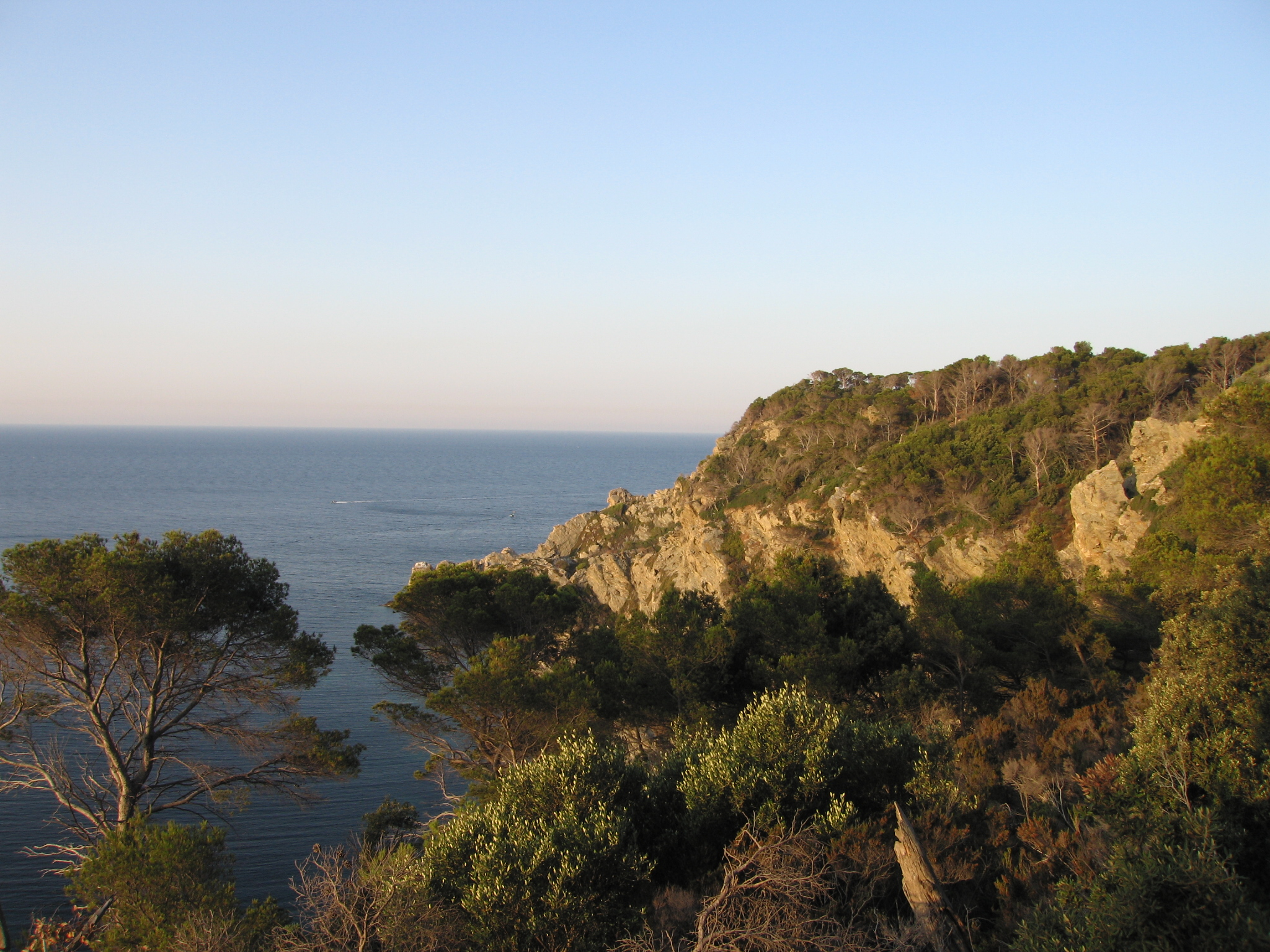
Porquerolles

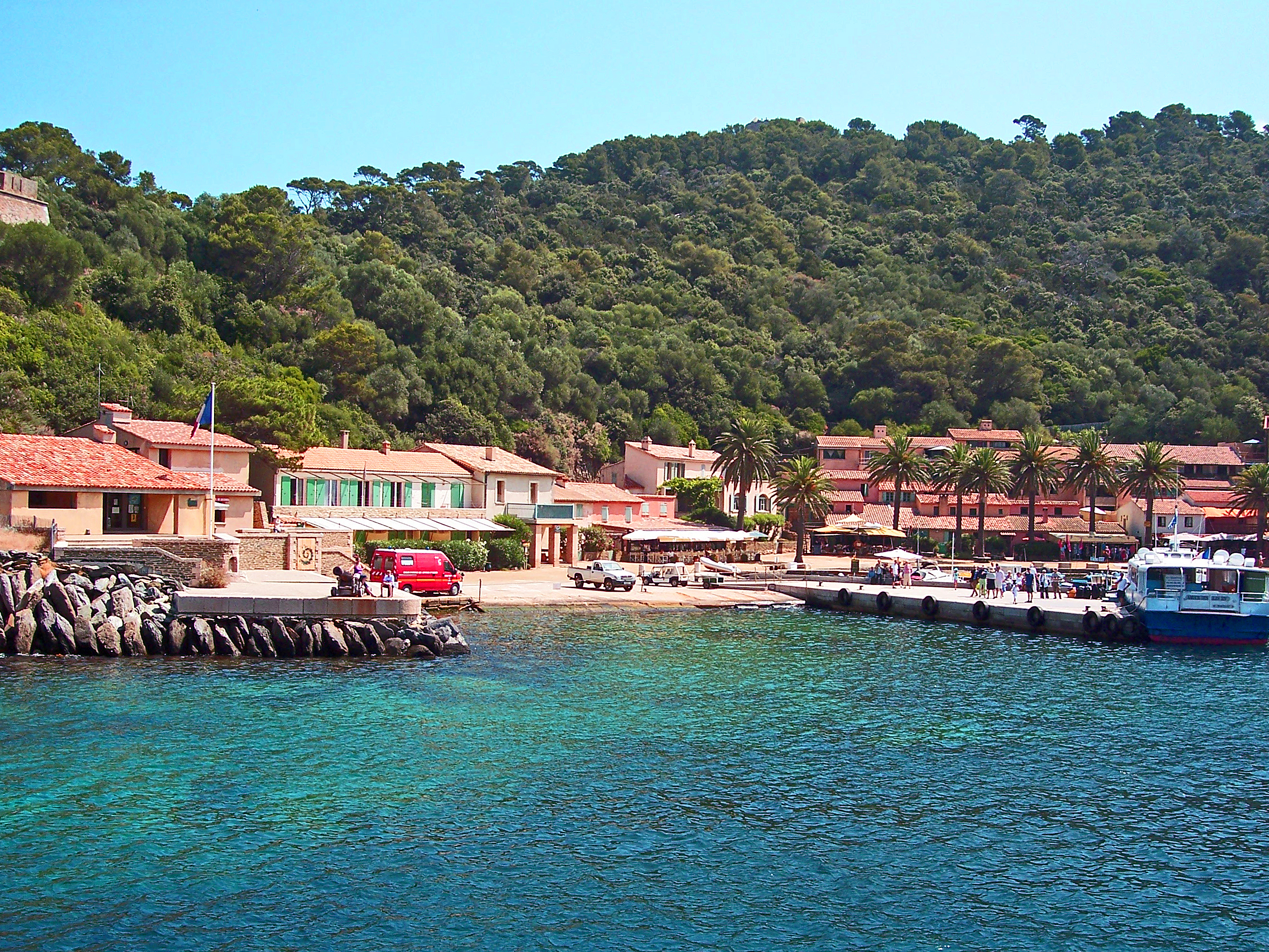
Port-Cros

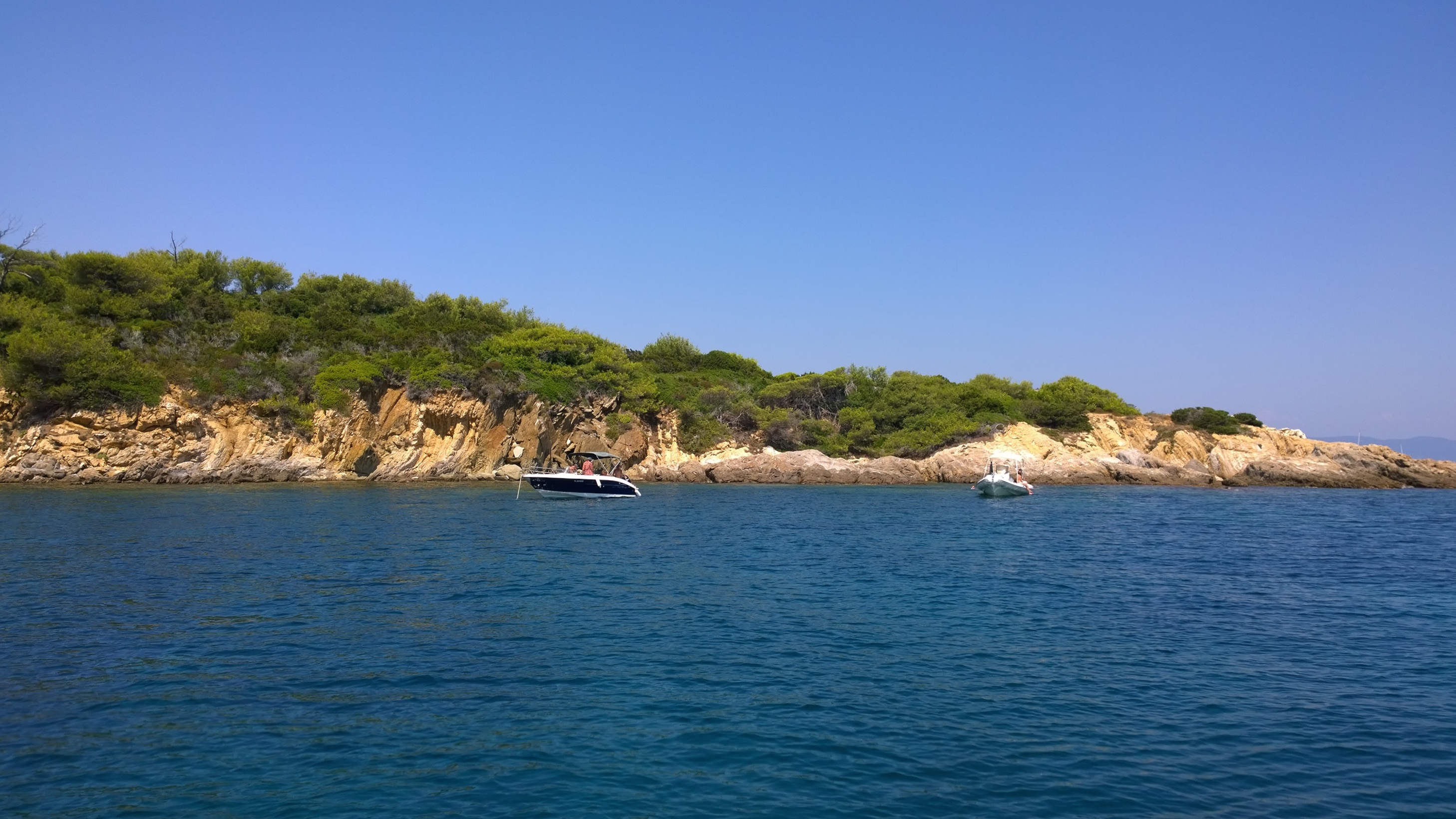
Île du Bagaud

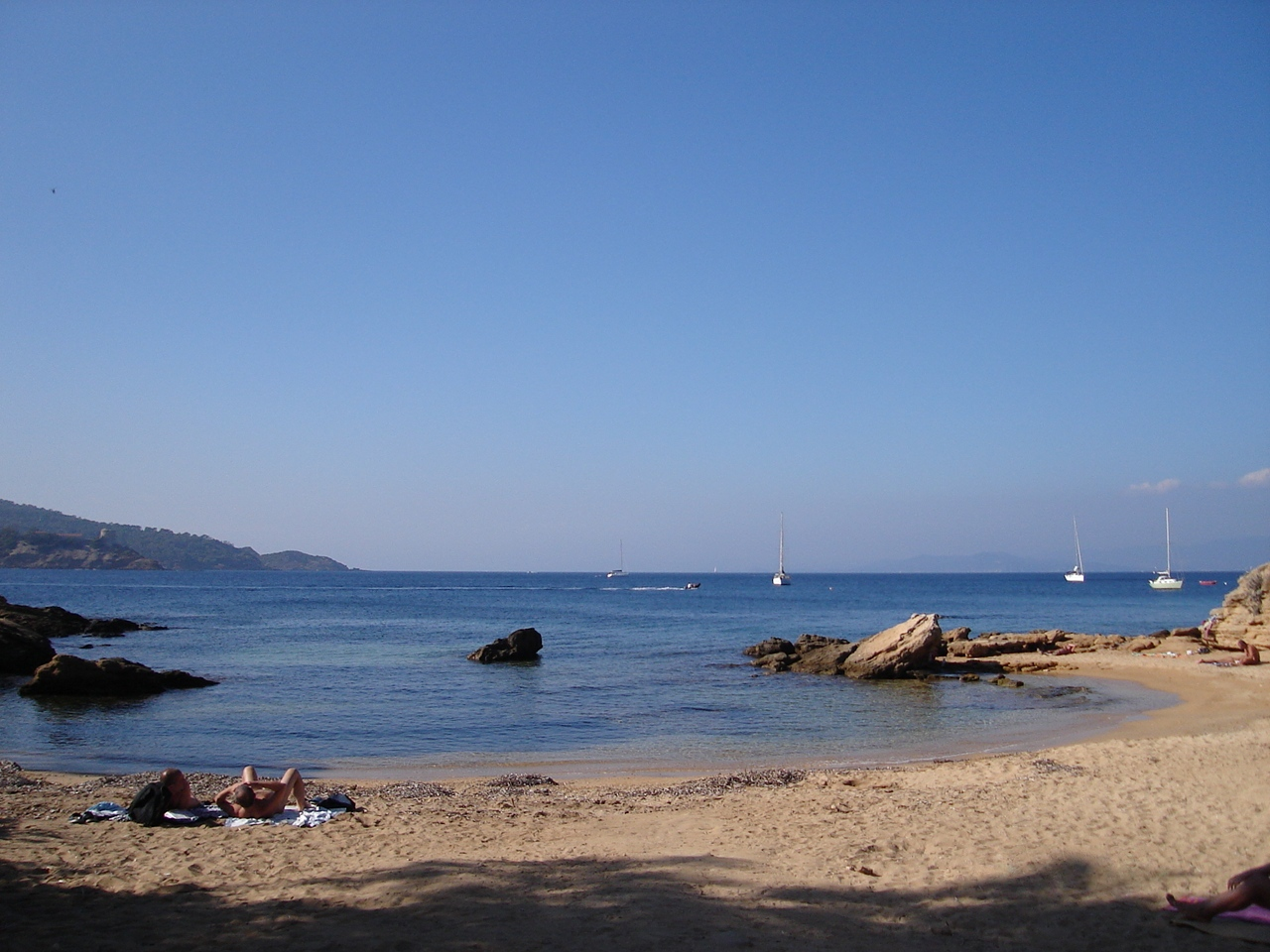
Île du Levant

== See also ==
- Battle of the Hyères Islands (1795)
