= Ol Doinyo Orok =

Mountain in southern Kenya, East Africa

Coordinates: 2°29′37.68″S 36°45′4.79″E

Namanga Hills (official name)
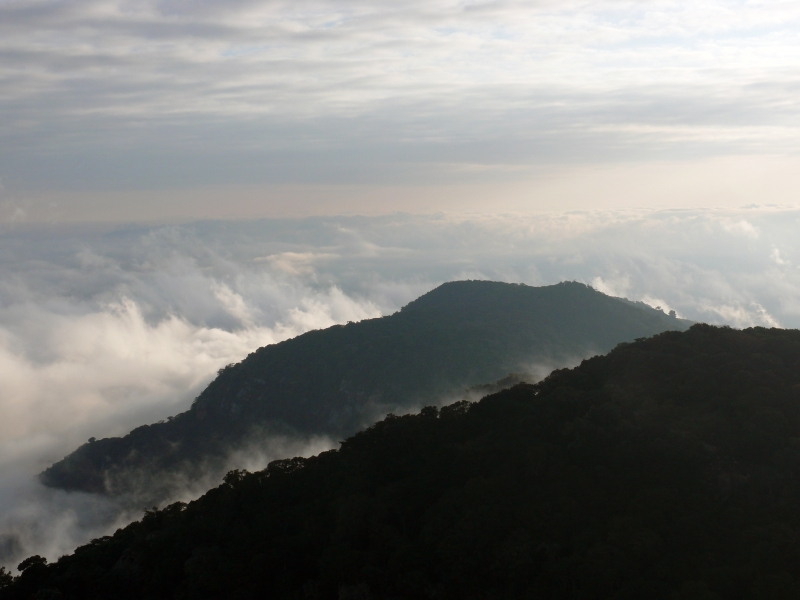

Highest point
- Elevation: 2,548 m (8,360 ft)

Geography
- Location: Kenya

The Ol Donyo Orok mountain (in maasai language), also called Namanga Hills, is situated in southern Kenya next to the Tanzanian border in the Namanga Division. The mountain has a stretched triangular shape, almost like an arrow pointing north. The short side faces the Tanzanian border (and one corner is actually crossing it). The highest peak is 2,548 metres (8,360 ft).

== OlDonyo Orok Mountain Forest Reserve ==
The OlDonyo Orok Mountain Forest Reserve is a government gazetted area, 117.84 square kilometres large. A large part of it consists of elevated cloud forest (above 1,700 metres (5,600 ft)). Being one of the few remaining patches in Kenya, it contains a large variety of plants, herbs and also several animal species not found in the surrounding semi-arid lowlands. In the mountain valleys there are natural water catchments created by the high altitude rains and the high humid climate. These provide the surrounding Maasai communities with water and pasture even during the dry seasons.

Cloud forest on OlDonyo Orok

The mountain wildlife has been under a lot of stress due to poaching and traditional Maasai hunting, which has wiped out many of the large mammals and predators. But there are still a small population of leopards to be found. Other large animals include buffaloes (in rapidly decreasing number due to poaching), bushbucks, olive baboons, vervet monkeys, rock hyraxes, etc. There are also a large variety of migratory and endemic birds in the area. Very little research has been taken place on the mountain ecology and no scientific animal count has been made on the large animals. The bush savanna vegetation in the surrounding lowlands is also home to animals like giraffes, zebras, gazelles, eland antelopes, warthogs, ostriches, african wild dogs and hyenas, etc. Many of these migrate to the high hills during nighttime or settle there during droughts. Occasionally elephants from Amboseli National Park or Tanzania migrate to the area.

Since the gazettement in 1979 the mountain forest have been generally well preserved, illegal wood cutting, charcoal burning, honey collecting through fires have decreased through the efforts of the Kenyan local authorities and Kenya Wildlife Service, with the support of local environmental committees.

== Tourism ==
The mountain receives few tourists annually, even though it lies next to Namanga, the gateway to Tanzania and Amboseli National Park. The local community is therefore trying to market the area more for treking visitors.

A 1928 ascent of the mountain is described in Vivienne de Watteville's book Speak to the Earth (1935).

== See also ==
- Cloud forest
