= Namanga =

- Town
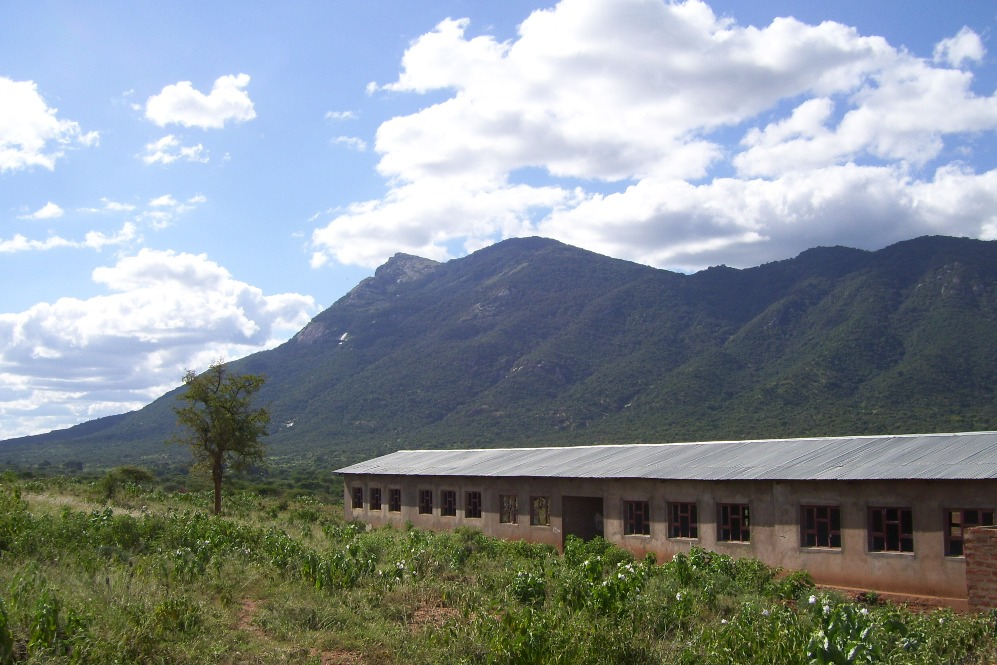
- A schoolhouse in Namanga

- Location within Kenya
- Coordinates: 2°33′S 36°47′E
- Tanzanian District: Longido District
- Kenyan County: Kajiado County

Population (1999)
  - Total: 5,500

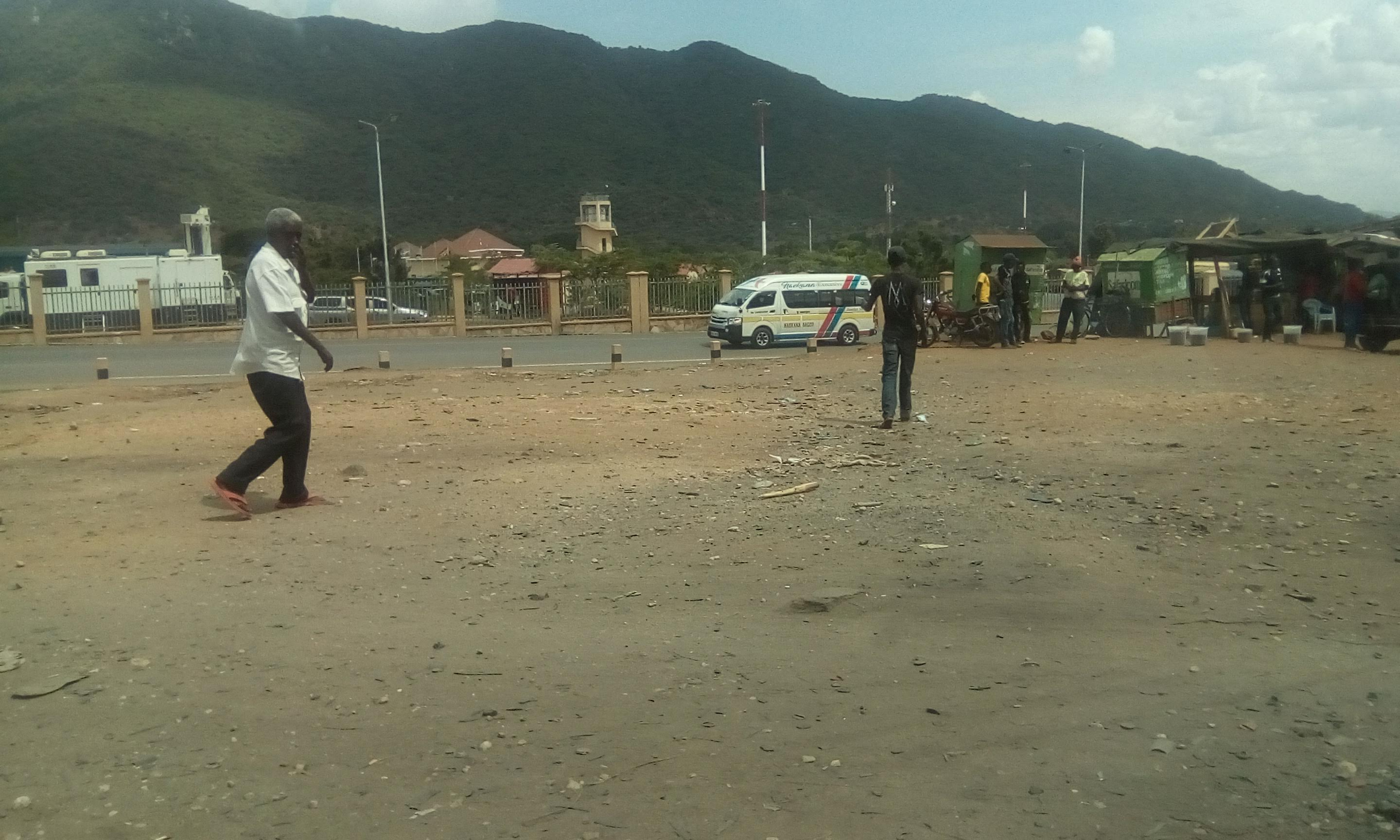

Namanga is a town divided by the Tanzania-Kenya border. It is in Longido District, Tanzania and Kajiado County, Kenya. It is around 110 kilometers from Arusha, Tanzania. Namanga's economy has been heavily dependent on tourism since 2004 as tourists visiting the nearby Amboseli National Park passed through the town from Nairobi (183 kilometers to the north). The town is surrounded by hills on both sides. Mount Kilimanjaro can be viewed from Namanga town which makes it a scenic place by tourists who lodge in Namanga on their way to either Tanzania or Amboseli. The nearby Ol Doinyo Orok mountain, also known as Namanga Hills, is located northwest of Namanga town. Namanga's latitude is S 2°32'39.8" and longitude E 36°47'20.2". The town has an urban population of approximately 10,000 while the rural population is approximately 5,500.

== Economic development ==
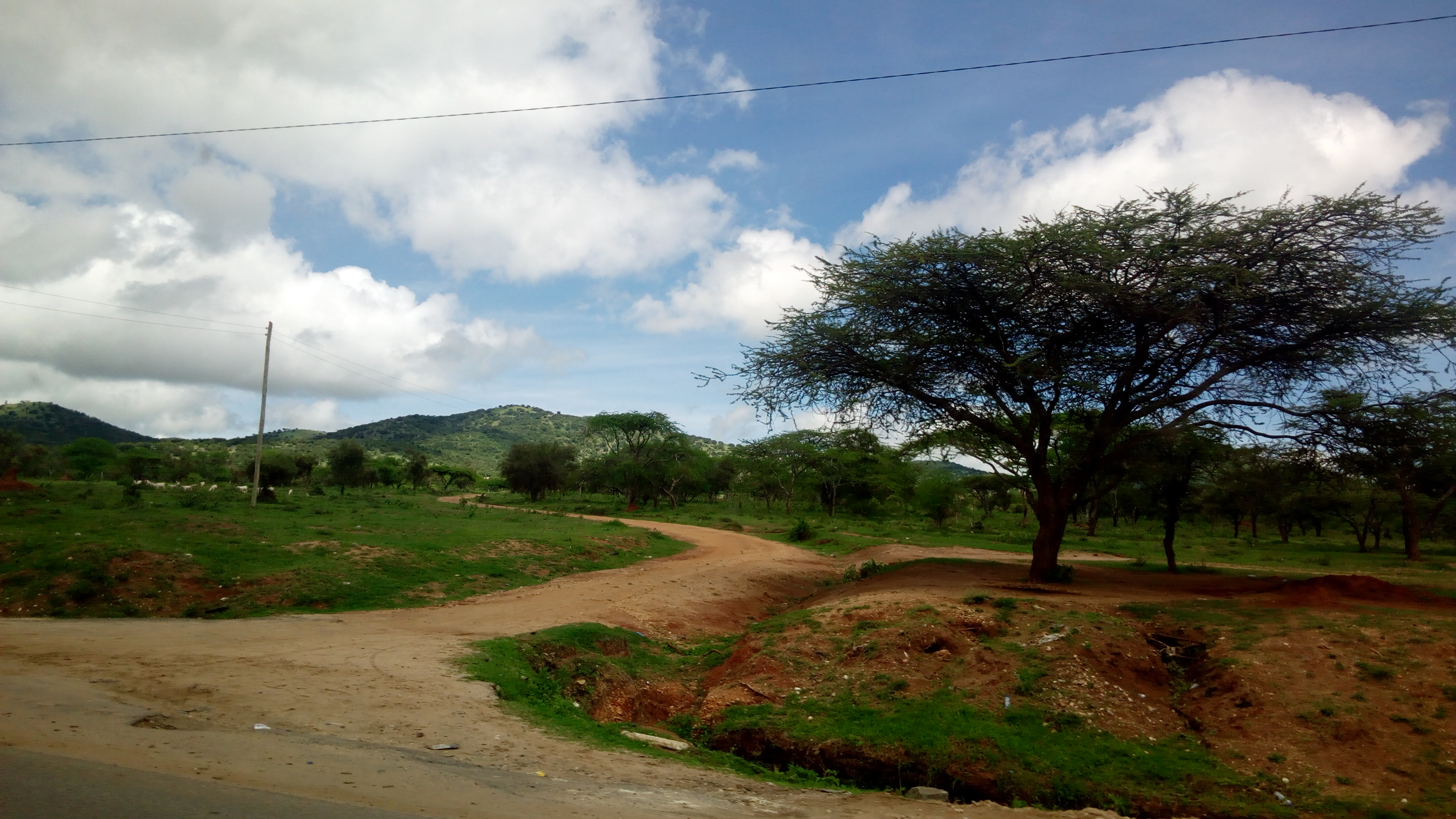
Namanga-Kajiado road

The economy of Namanga has been on the rise as it ceased to depend only on tourism. The town is currently dependent both on tourism and on import and export from both Kenya and Tanzania. With the opening of the East African Community borders, the town will benefit from market of both countries which according to the statistical bureau of Kenya will trigger a population growth of the town to an approximate of 30,000. With the recent investment by the financial institutions and the completion of the great north road, the town has grown economical especially in its infrastructure. This development has increased transport activities from the area as it triggered more importation of commodities from Tanzania to Kenya as it is assumed to be cheaper.

== Population diversity ==
Namanga is a cosmopolitan town. Its population includes several tribes from all part of the country. Its main population is from the Maasai community who occupy most of the parts in Namanga. The Somali communities are second in majority. This was catalyzed by the indigenous East African pastrolist culture Which has shared deep-rooted survival strategies defined by seasonal herd mobility, and communal solidarity between the Maasai and the Somali. The rest of the population is occupied by other ethnicity groups which include the Kamba, the Cushites who are Kikuyu, and many other communities.
