= Port-Cros National Park =

French national park in Var

- Parc national de Port-Cros
- IUCN category II (national park)
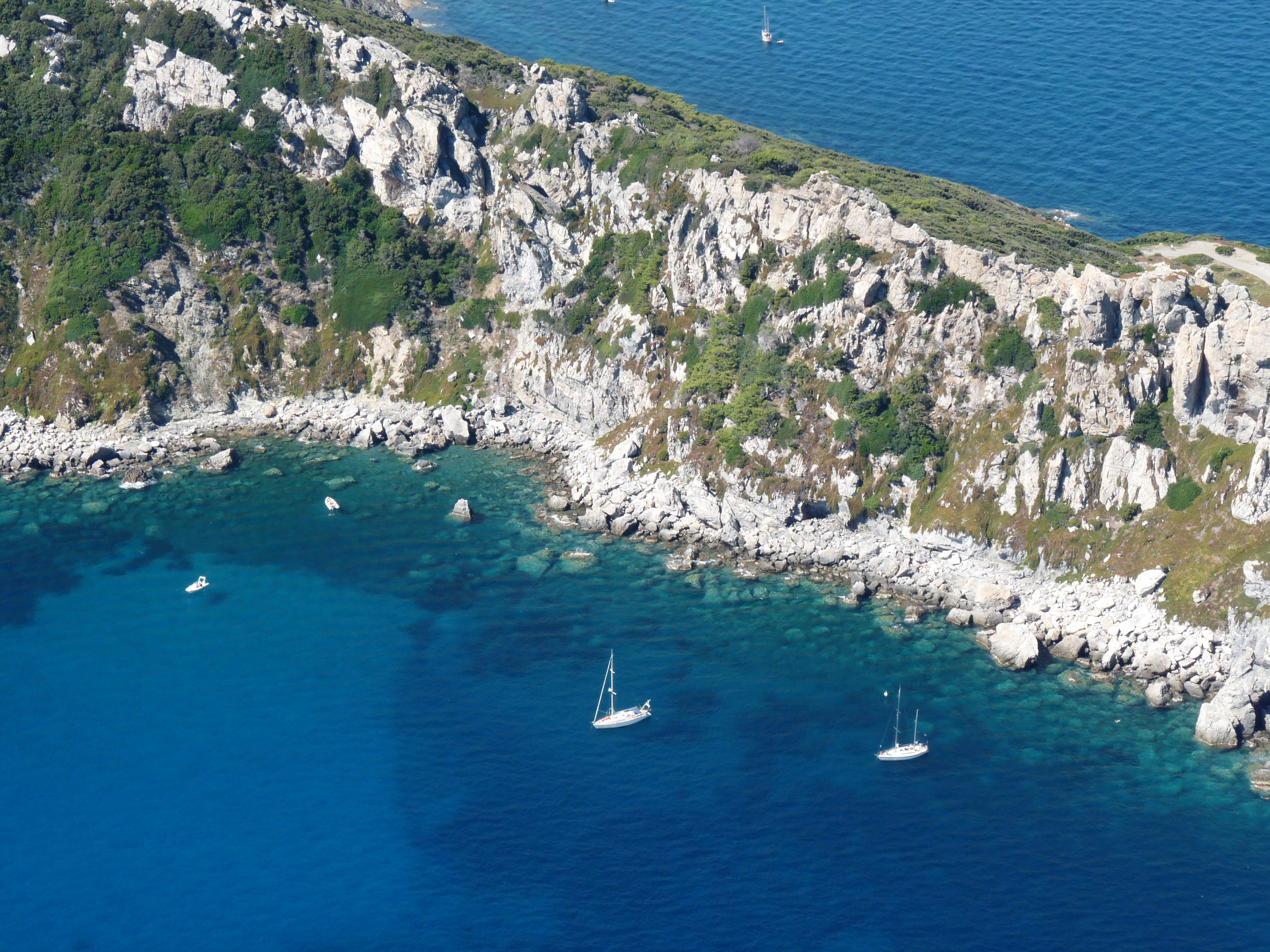
- Pointe Mèdes in Porquerolles

- Location within France
- Location: Port-Cros, Var
- Nearest city: Hyères
- Coordinates: 43°00′15″N 6°23′43″E
- Area: 46 km^{2} (18 sq mi)
- Established: 14 December 1963
- Governing body: Parcs nationaux de France
- Website: www.portcrosparcnational.fr

Port-Cros National Park (French: Parc national de Port-Cros) is a French national park established on the Mediterranean island of Port-Cros, east of Toulon. It also administers natural areas in some surrounding locales.

== History ==
Map of Port-Cros National Park and adjacent limited areas

The park was founded in 1963 after the island of Port-Cros was bequeathed to the state; it became France's second national park after Vanoise National Park. The state is the sole land owner on the island, which is a natural protected area. The park's boundaries were extended in 2012 to encompass most of Porquerolles.

== Geography ==
Port-Cros National Park is the first national park in Europe that unites terrestrial and maritime protection zones. The protected area is about 1,700 hectares of land and 2,900 hectares of sea at a 600 metre (656 yard) zone from the coast. Most of the area of the main islands of Port-Cros and Porquerolles are protected, as well as the small islands of Bagaud, Gabinière and Rascas. Until 2012, about 1,000 hectares of land on the island of Porquerolles had since 1971 been under the national park's administration (Conservatoire Botanique National Méditerranéen de Porquerolles).

== Regulations ==
There are strict behaviour rules for the few inhabitants as well as daily tourists there. Sea bathing is only permitted on three beaches and smoking or taking dogs can result in an extensive fine.
