= Assassination of François Santoni =

2001 murder in France

- Part of the Corsican conflict
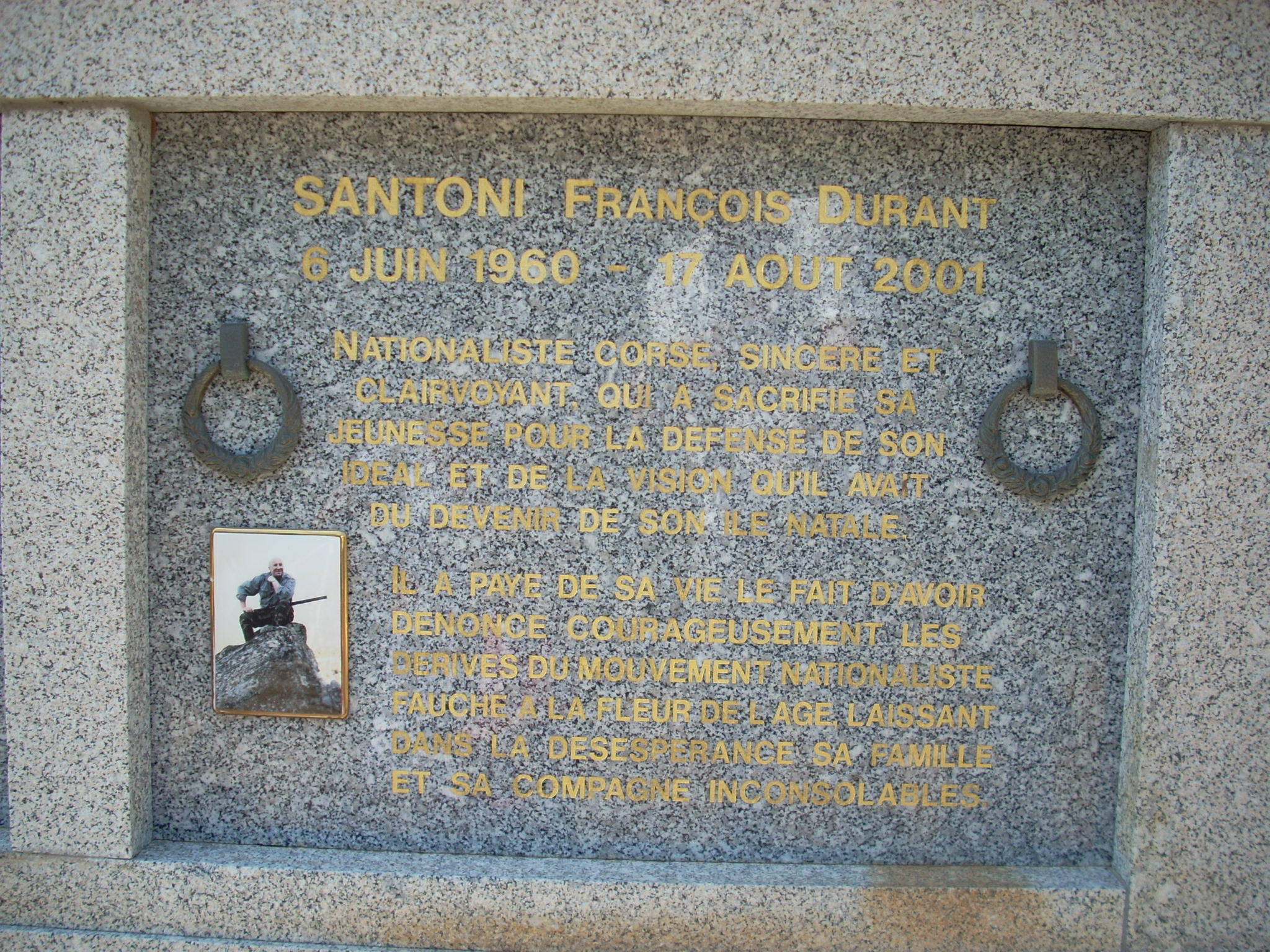
- The grave of Santoni in his home town of Giannuccio, a fraction of the commune of Monacia-d'Aullène
- Location: Monacia-d'Aullène, Corse-du-Sud, France
- Date: 17 August 2001
- Target: François Santoni
- Weapon: 7.62 calibre assault rifle
- Deaths: François Santoni
- Injuries: Jean-René Tomasi
- Perpetrators: Gang de la Brise de Mer; Alain Robin; Ange-Marie Orsoni
- Charges: assassination, attempted assassination, complicity in assassination, complicity in attempted assassination and criminal association in connection with a terrorist enterprise

On 17 August 2001, Corsican guerrilla leader and head of the extremist Armata Corsa organisation François Santoni was shot 13 times while attending the marriage of a family friend. The groom, Jean-René Tomasi, was also injured in the attack. The 6 attackers were mostly members of the Brise de Mer mafia, the largest mafia group in Corsica at the time, with the exception of Ange-Marie Orsoni. The attack was done after Santoni began accusing members of the National Liberation Front of Corsica-Canal Historique (FLNC-Canale Storicu, FLNC-CS), an organisation he resigned from co-leading three years before, of conspiring with the mafia. Despite the factors leading up to the incident, the incident has largely been ruled as personal score-settling without a political motivation. The incident was a major event in modern Corsican history, ending the 12-year long period of infighting known as the Years of Lead.

Santoni's death was initially investigated as a political affair due to his departure from the FLNC-CS and the subsequent war between Santoni's new group, Armata Corsa, and a coalition of other paramilitaries led by the FLNC-CS. However, evidence began to surface revealing the assassination to be an attack from the Brise de Mer mafia, a group he had been in a feud with due to his staunch anti-mafia positions. However, the participation of Ange-Marie Orsoni, the other assassin, has raised questions regarding the nature of the attack and the political climate at the time.

== Background ==
In September 1998, François Santoni resigned as co-leader of the FLNC-Canal Historique (Canale Storicu, FLNC-CS), after propagating accusations that the group, particularly the northern section surrounding co-leader Charles Pieri, was negotiating an alliance with the Corsican mafia, particularly the Brise de Mer. Santoni also resigned over disagreements of the return to arms of the FLNC-CS. While agreeing with a military method of independence, Santoni believed the Tralonca peace campaign, a peace negotiation he oversaw personally with interior minister Alain Juppé, should have been honoured “on principle”. Santoni would form his own political party shortly after, Presenza Naziunale. Santoni would return to armed separatism in 1999 with the formation of Armata Corsa, a radical separatist militia. Despite the constant guerrilla warfare already present in Corsica, Armata Corsa's streak of kidnappings, assassinations, and racist attacks gave the organization the label “terrorist” both inside and outside of nationalist circles.

One of Santoni's major goals while leading Armata Corsa was the end of Corsican organized crime and the mafia, which Santoni often linked to the guerrilla groups which opposed him. his stance on the mafia got him into a feud with the Brise de Mer, the largest mafia organization in Corsica at the time. Santoni's war with rival nationalist guerrillas and the feud with the mafia caused him to become increasingly paranoid, oftentimes stating to friends and news reporters that he knows of plots to kill him and that he is prepared to either die or avoid death.

== Assassination ==
On the night between 16 and 17 August 2001, François Santoni attended the wedding of a family friend, Jean-René Tomasi, in Monacia-d'Aullène, the town of his birth. At around 00:40 on 17 August, as Santoni was leaving the wedding, a group of 6 men led by Alain Robin and Ange-Marie Orsoni ambushed Santoni while he was walking to his car. Santoni was shot 13 times with a 7.62 calibre assault rifle, and Tomasi, attempting to intervene, was injured by shrapnel. Santoni's relatives, including his new partner, his father, and his nephew were present at the crime scene. Santoni's lawyer, Pascal Gabarini, arrived that morning to assess the crime scene.

Police arrived around 04:00, and blocked off the area around Santoni's body and his car, a BMW registered in Italy, which was riddled with bullets. Santoni's father, still present at the scene, was found looming over the body of his son. Police launched an appeal for witnesses that morning.

== Investigation and Aftermath ==
An investigation was launched the morning after the attack, spearheaded by Ajaccio public prosecutor Jacques Dallet. The immediate first route of investigation involved a political assassination by Corsican guerrillas from the FLNC-Union of Combatants (FLNC-Unione di i Cumbattenti, FLNC-UC), a newly formed group founded by a union of the FLNC-CS with other militant groups opposing Armata Corsa in December 1999. A weapons cache found around the Paris area in October caused police to suspect that nationalists of the former rival party of Cuncolta, Alain Orsoni's Movement for Self-Determination, the political wing of the FLNC-Canal Habituel, were involved.

The connection to Brise de Mer was discovered through the August 2002 arrest of 6 Brise members, three of which were involved in the unit that ambushed and killed Santoni. The ring leader, Alain Robin, was still at large at the time, fleeing the arrests. Robin would be arrested in 2004.

The other leader of the attack was not a Brise member, but rather Ange-Marie Orsoni, cousin of the former leader of the FLNC-Canal Habituel (Canale Abituale, FLNC-CA), Alain Orsoni. The Habituels and Historiques were in war for the entire existence of the Habituels, which dissolved in 1997. In 1996, Santoni was the target of a Habituel assassination attempt led by Ange-Marie Orsoni. Santoni's bodyguard and close friend, Jules Massa, was killed in the attack. Orsoni involved himself in the Brise operation due to Santoni allegedly informing the police of his involvement in the assassination attempt. Orsoni died of a heart attack on 11 September 2001.
