= Jean-Guy Talamoni =

President of the Corsican Assembly (2015-2021)

- Ghjuvan’Guidu Talamoni
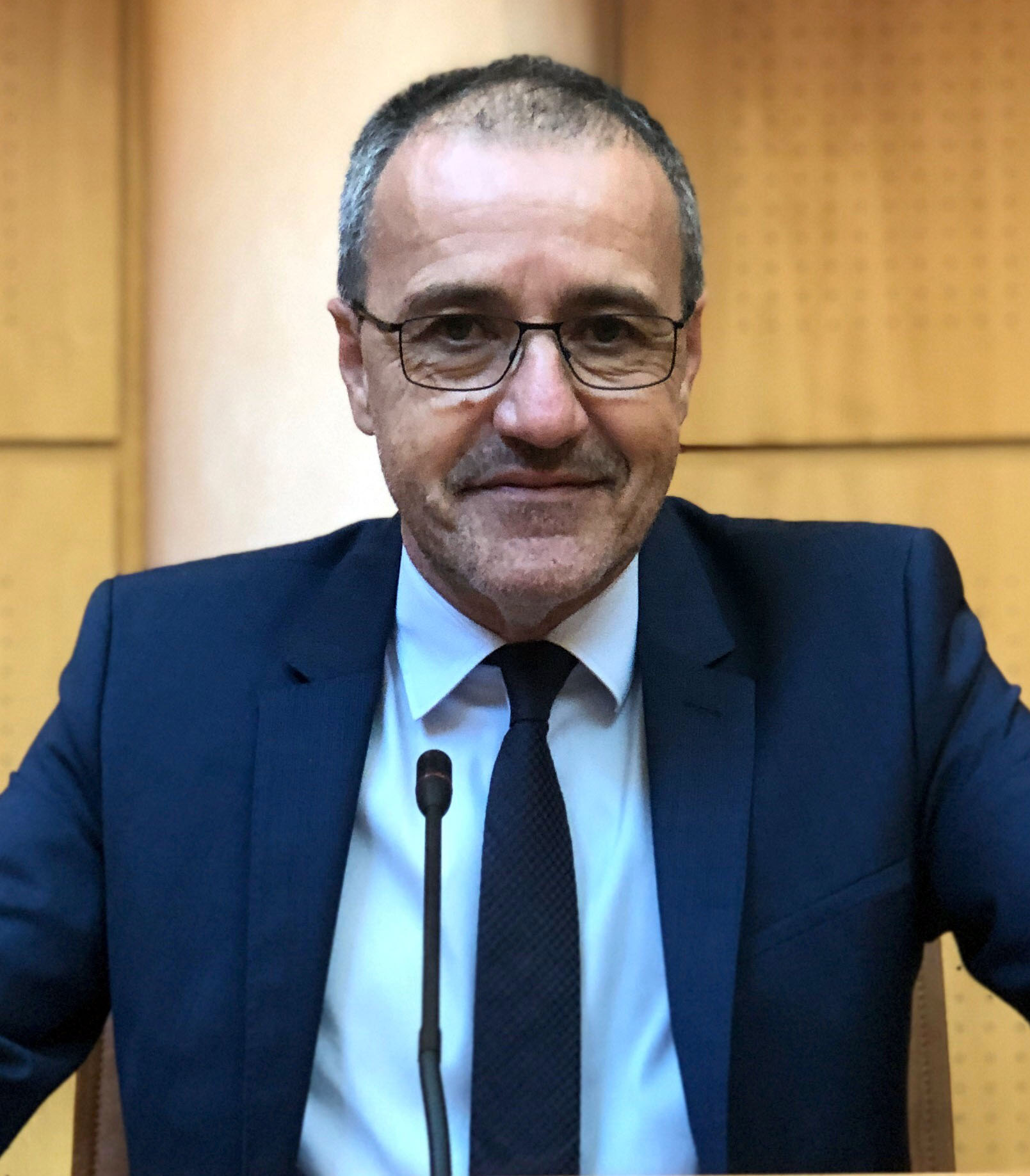

President of the Corsican Assembly
- In office 17 December 2015 – 1 July 2021
- Preceded by: Dominique Bucchini
- Succeeded by: Marie-Antoinette Maupertuis

President of Corsica Libera
- In office 1 February 2009 – 1 July 2021
- Preceded by: Position established
- Succeeded by: Josepha Giacometti

President of Corsica Nazione Indipendente
- In office 7 November 2004 – 1 February 2009

President of Unione Naziunale
- In office 1 February 2004 – 1 February 2009
- Preceded by: Position established
- Succeeded by: Position abolished

President of Corsica Nazione
- In office 8 January 1992 – 1 February 2004
- Preceded by: Position established
- Succeeded by: Position abolished

Personal details
- Born: 6 May 1960 (age 66) Saumur, Maine-et-Loire, France
- Party: Corsica Libera
- Education: University of Corsica Pasquale Paoli (DEA); University of Provence

Jean-Guy Talamoni (Corsican: Ghjuvan’Guidu Talamoni; born 6 May 1960) is a Corsican politician and Corsican nationalist, who was President of the Corsican Assembly from 17 December 2015 to 1 July 2021. He previously served as leader of the Corsica Nazione electoral group in the Corsican assembly.

Born in Saumur to a Corsican father and a Spanish mother, Talamoni and his family moved to Morosaglia when he was only one year old. Talamoni became involved in the Corsican liberation struggle at a young age, attending meetings of the militant Action for Corsican Rebirth (Azione per a Rinascita Corsa, ARC) with his parents when he was a child. At the age of fifteen, Talamoni attended Edmond Simeoni’s ARC meeting announcing the beginning of the Aleria Standoff. A year later, at the age of sixteen, Talamoni joined a Corsican nationalist student union. It was there where he likely became involved in the armed struggle of the National Liberation Front of Corsica, but like Gerry Adams and the Provisional IRA, Talamoni has often rejected his involvement in any armed conflict. In 1988, Talamoni was certified as a lawyer, and becomes head of A Cuncolta Naziunalista’s “law and institutions” sector. In 1992, Talamoni became president of the Corsica Nazione coalition in the Corsican Assembly. Talamoni became a controversial figure in 1999 due to his stances during the Matignon accords. In 2004, Talamoni became leader of Unione Naziunale, a new Corsican nationalist coalition. In April 2004, Talamoni was arrested by French police as part of a large operation against the FLNC-Union of Combatants, but he was released soon after. He was charged in 2005 for terrorism, but acquitted after the criminal court found a fair trial to be “nearly impossible” due to the tense political climate of the Corsican conflict. In 2015, Talamoni became president of the Corsican Assembly under an electoral alliance with the Corsican autonomist Femu a Corsica party.

== Early life ==
Jean-Guy Talamoni was born on 6 May 1960 in Saumur, Maine-et-Loire. His mother, Élisabeth Talamoni (née Ortega), was a French Moroccan of Spanish descent. His father, Antoine (Antone), was born in Morocco to a Corsican family who had recently arrived there from Haute-Corse. Talamoni moved to Morosaglia, Haute-Corse when he was only one year old. His father was a schoolteacher and his mother was a bookkeeper. Talamoni’s family was notable in left-wing politics, with his grand-uncle, Louis Talamoni, serving as a senator for the French Communist Party in Seine and Val-de-Marne.

Throughout his youth, his parents would take him to meetings of the militant Action for Corsican Rebirth (Azione per a Rinascita Corsa, ARC) in Aleria and Corte. In August 1975, Talamoni witnessed the chaos of the Aleria standoff during Edmond Simeoni’s speech in Corte announcing the action. In 1976, at the age of sixteen, Talamoni joined the Union of Corsican Students (Unione di Liceani Corsi, ULC) at his high school. The ULC was involved in the Corsican separatist movement, and was connected to the National Liberation Front of Corsica (Fronte di Liberazione Naziunale di a Corsica, FLNC). Talamoni likely joined the FLNC through the ULC, but he maintains he was never involved in the armed guerrilla movement. In 1978, Talamoni moved to Aix-en-Provence and studied law at the University of Provence. In 1986, Talamoni returned to Corsica and received his DEA in the Corsican language from the newly opened University of Corsica. In 1988, he received his certificate of law from the Bastia bar.

== Political career ==
In 1988, Talamoni was appointed head of the “law and institutions” sector of A Cuncolta Naziunalista, the political wing of the FLNC, created in 1987 after the original political wing, the Corsican Movement for Self-Determination (Muvimentu Corsu per l'Autodeterminazione, MCA), was banned. after the controversial FLNC ceasefire that same year, Talamoni sided with the dissidents, and was a key figure in the putsch of A Cuncolta Naziunalista, which turned A Cuncolta into a political party associated with anti-ceasefire dissidents. A Cuncolta Naziunalista became the political wing of the FLNC-Canal Historique (Canale Storicu, FLNC-CS) upon its formation in December 1990.

In 1992, Corsica Nazione was formed as a broad coalition of Corsican nationalist parties, including A Cuncolta Naziunalista. Talamoni was appointed president of the group. Talamoni would lead Corsica Nazione until its dissolution in 2004. During that time, Talamoni became the symbolic figure of the political struggle for Corsican independence, an extension of the armed struggle, ongoing since 1976.

Talamoni would also become known for his work as a lawyer, serving as the personal lawyer for many important FLNC-CS figures such as co-leader Charles Pieri.

During the Tralonca peace campaign, Talamoni served as a government envoy for A Cuncolta Naziunalista, spearheading FLNC-CS negotiations along with François Santoni. Talamoni was largely unpleased with the course of the peace process, and negotiations came to a swift end in October 1996.

In 2000, a year after Santoni’s founding of Armata Corsa following his 1998 break from the FLNC-CS, Armata Corsa commander Jean-Michel Rossi was assassinated in L’Île Rousse by the FLNC-CS. Santoni himself implicated Talamoni in the murder, writing a book detailing his alleged involvement. Santoni alleges that Charles Pieri ordered the assassination personally through a prison phone, handing the cell phone chip to his lawyer, Talamoni. Talamoni claims this was only done to harm his reputation and the ongoing Matignon process, which Talamoni was spearheading on the side of the nationalists.

On 1 February 2004, Talamoni creates the Unione Naziunale, ending Corsica Nazione. Talamoni becomes president of the UN.

On 15 April 2004, Talamoni was arrested by French police during a large-scale operation against Corsican guerrillas. Talamoni would be charged with terrorism, but acquitted in May 2005 after a campaign of support by the League of Human Rights gave him the status of political prisoner. Throughout his prison sentencing, Talamoni maintained that he was a victim of a “politico-judicial setup” aimed to dismantle the Matignon accords and his reputation.

On 2 January 2009, Talamoni’s party, Indipendenza, the political wing of the FLNC-Union of Combatants formed out of A Cuncolta Indipendentista and other parties in 2001, merged with many others to form Corsica Libera. Talamoni becomes president.

=== President of the Corsican Assembly ===
On 17 December 2015, Talamoni was elected president of the Corsican Assembly, the first nationalist to hold the position. Talamoni’s position saw him work closely with president of the Corsican executive council, Gilles Simeoni. Talamoni opened dialogue to Macron and interior minister Gérald Darmanin to secure further autonomy for Corsica.

Talamoni was succeeded by Marie-Antoinette Maupertius on 1 July 2021.
