= Corsica Nazione =

Corsican nationalist electoral group

- Chamber: Corsican Assembly
- Foundation: 8 January 1992
- Dissolution: 2004
- Member parties: A Cuncolta Naziunalista (1992-1998); A Cuncolta Indipendentista (1998-2004); I Verdi Corsi; Per u Paese; Accolta Naziunale Corsa (1992-1993); Unione di U Populu Corsu (1992-1994)
- President: Jean-Guy Talamoni
- Ideology: Corsican Nationalism
- Political position: far-left

Corsica Nazione (lit. 'Corsican Nation') was an electoral group in the Corsican Assembly composed of Corsican nationalist parties. It was led by Jean-Guy Talamoni, who would later become president of the Corsican Assembly in 2015 under the Corsica Libera political party. The group supported the nationalist paramilitaries of the Corsican conflict, and many of the parties in the coalition were political wings of various armed factions.

== History ==
Corsica Nazione formed in January 1992 through a turbulent alliance of five separatist parties: A Cuncolta Naziunalista, the political wing of the National Liberation Front of Corsica-Canal Historique, Accolta Naziunale Corsa (ANC), the political wing of Resistenza, I Verdi Corsi, a nationalist party focused on green politics in Corsica, Per u Paese, a small group, and the Unione di u Populu Corsu (UPC), one of the oldest Corsican nationalist parties.

The group immediately struggled to maintain order. At the formation conference held on 8 January, representatives of A Cuncolta Naziunalista and representatives of the ANC began to argue over the inclusion of specific members of A Cuncolta Naziunalista who were associated with development projects on the island of Cavallu. After back-and-forth bickering, ANC representatives withdrew from the conference. After UPC representatives held a mediation meeting, the ANC representatives agreed to return to the conference, and Corsica Nazione was formed officially.

In the 1992 territorial elections, Corsica Nazione got 20% of the vote, and received 9 seats:

- A Cuncolta Naziunalista: 3 seats
- I Verdi Corsi: 1 seat
- ANC: 2 seats
- UPC: 3 seats
- Per u Paese: 0 seats

This was the largest electoral victory for the nationalists they had ever received, and was a major advancement in nationalist politics, at the time still dominated by armed insurrection.

In April 1993, the ANC again withdrew from Corsica Nazione, this time permanently. This was due to the bomb attack at the ANC headquarters, carried out by the FLNC-Canal Historique (Canale Storicu, FLNC-CS). The FLNC-CS is the political wing of A Cuncolta Naziunalista, who denies their involvement in the action. Both of the ANC elected officials withdrew from Corsica Nazione, and the ANC was expelled officially on 20 April after a failed attempt by UPC officials to mediate.

In May 1994, the UPC resigned from Corsica Nazione, citing the assassination of Robert Sozzi, a former FLNC-CS member who was killed by his own organisation in June 1993 after opposing the methods of arms trafficking and money laundering within the FLNC. this left only three parties in Corsica Nazione.

Corsica Nazione received 5 seats in the 1998 territorial elections. However, the UPC, no longer part of the coalition, filed a case of fraud with the council of state after losing the threshold for a seat by only 41 votes. A re-election was held in 1999, and Corsica Nazione received 8 seats.

In June 1998, A Cuncolta Naziunalista became A Cuncolta Indipendentista.

In September 1998, François Santoni resigned from the FLNC-CS and A Cuncolta Indipendentista, creating Presenza Naziunale.

In May 2001, A Cuncolta Indipendentista created Indipendenza with other nationalist parties. Indipendenza became the political wing of the FLNC-Union of Combattants, formed in 1999 with the participation of the FLNC-CS.

In 2004, the President of Corsica Nazione Jean-Guy Talamoni announced the formation of a new electoral alliance: Union Naziunale.

== Electoral history ==
Corsican Assembly
Election	Seats
1992	9 / 51
1998 (annulled)	5 / 51
1999	8 / 51
