= François Santoni =

Corsican politician and guerrilla leader

- Francescu Santoni
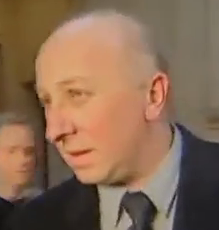
- Santoni before the Bastia criminal court in 1999.

Co-leader of the FLNC-Canal Historique
- In office 25 November 1990 – 8 September 1998 Serving with Charles Pieri
- Preceded by: position established
- Succeeded by: Charles Pieri becomes sole leader

Secretary-General of A Cuncolta Naziunalista for Corse-du-Sud
- In office 1 August 1990 – 13 June 1998
- Preceded by: Alain Orsoni (Secretary-General for all of Corsica)
- Succeeded by: A Cuncolta Naziunalista becomes A Cuncolta Indipendentista

Secretary-General of A Cuncolta Indipendentista for Corse-du-Sud
- In office 13 June 1998 – 8 September 1998
- Preceded by: A Cuncolta Naziunalista becomes A Cuncolta Indipendentista
- Succeeded by: Charles Pieri (Secretary-General for all of Corsica)

Secretary-General of Presenza Naziunale
- In office 8 September 1998 – 17 August 2001
- Preceded by: position established
- Succeeded by: position abolished

Co-leader of Armata Corsa
- In office 26 June 1999 – 17 August 2001 Serving with Jean-Michel Rossi until 7 August 2000
- Preceded by: position established
- Succeeded by: position abolished

Personal details
- Born: 6 June 1960 Giannuccio, Corsica, France
- Died: 17 August 2001 (aged 41) Monacia-d'Aullène, Corse-du-Sud, France
- Cause of death: Assassination
- Resting place: Giannuccio, Corse-du-Sud, France
- Other political affiliations: Muvimentu Corsu per l'Autodeterminazione (MCA) (1983-1987)
- Domestic partner(s): Marie-Hélène Mattei (1992-1998); Christelle Baldocchi (1998-2001)

François Durand Séraphin Santoni (Corsican: Francescu Durandu Serafina Santoni; (6 June 1960 – 17 August 2001) was a Corsican politician and guerrilla leader serving as the co-leader of the National Liberation Front of Corsica-Canal Historique (Fronte di Liberazione Naziunale di a Corsica-Canale Storicu, FLNC-CS) and one of the two secretary-generals of its political wing, A Cuncolta Naziunalista (later A Cuncolta Indipendentista) from 1990 to 1998, when he left both organizations to found his own political party, Presenza Naziunale, and its armed wing, Armata Corsa.

Santoni became involved in politics at a young age, organizing nationalist rallies at his local high school in Ajaccio. In 1978, while attending university in Aix-en-Provence, Santoni joined a group of other nationalist Corsican diaspora students to form an outreach for the FLNC on the French mainland. Soon after, Santoni's military prowess was recognized by leaders in Corsica, and Santoni was promoted to command the Gravona division of the FLNC. During the failed 1988 peace process, Santoni became an outspoken critic of the ongoing government negotiations, and he gained even more power by commanding a dissident organization and taking over Alain Orsoni's A Cuncolta Naziunalista political party, transforming it into the radical political wing of the newly formed FLNC-Canal Historique (Canale Storicu, FLNC-CS), which he became the co-leader of, leading alongside Charles Pieri, a political kingpin from the Bastia area. Santoni was in charge of the Corse-du-Sud divisions, and Pieri was in charge of the Haute-Corse divisions, effectively splitting the organization around department lines. This was mirrored in the political party, splitting the position of governor-general along department lines with Santoni in charge of the south. Santoni oversaw crucial periods of the FLNC-CS, acting as negotiator with interior minister Jean-Louis Debré during the 1996 peace attempt, and heading foreign connections within the group. In 1998, after a reorganisation of the group, Santoni began to grow dissatisfied with the direction of the organisation, taking particular issue with the rumour of mafia funding towards Charles Pieri. Santoni resigned from the group in September 1998, and garnered his own political following in the political party Presenza Naziunale. In 1999, Presenza's armed wing, the notorious Armata Corsa group was founded by Santoni. Armata Corsa would face a war against an alliance of military groups on the island, spearheaded by the FLNC-CS (now under the sole control of Pieri). On 17 August 2001, Santoni was assassinated at a wedding in his hometown of Monacia-d'Aullène by members of the Brise de Mer mafia, assisted by soldiers from the FLNC-UC, a group formed by a union of the FLNC-CS and other military groups in late 1999.

== Early life ==
François Santoni was born in Giannuccio, a fraction of the commune of Monacia-d'Aullène in southern Corsica. Santoni grew up in the rural village, only leaving the area to attend school. Sometime in his childhood, his family moved to Ajaccio, where Santoni would attend high school. Santoni descended from a prominent and influential clan in southern Corsica which participated in a number of clan wars with rivaling families; Santoni's grandfather was violently murdered by these rivals after erecting a water cistern on a road in his native village.

While in high school, at the age of 15, Santoni witnessed the first major attack by Corsican militants: the Aleria Standoff. This, along with the growing nationalism among the other children his age, inspired him to become an ardent Corsican nationalist. Santoni, however, frequently stated he was a "Corsican before a nationalist", due to his belief that Corsican nationalism was frequently used as a general anti-government label among the people he attended high school with. After graduating in 1978, Santoni moved to Aix-en-Provence, where he attended Paul Cézanne University.

== Joining armed struggle and rise to power ==
=== Petty crime in Aix-en-Provence ===
Santoni, radicalized by the heavily nationalistic Corsican diaspora in Aix-en-Provence, began to organize small bands of delinquents during his years in university. Santoni stated that he "played thieves" with the police in the town, committing various petty crimes. His leadership of these small groups encouraged him to take on a more militaristic role, stating "I should have gone to military school. I like rigor, discipline, and order". In 1982, Santoni returned to Corsica, rising the ranks and being placed in charge of the Gravona brigade of the National Liberation Front of Corsica.

=== In the FLNC ===
Santoni's leadership of the Gravona brigade was heavily militaristic. Santoni became famous in nationalist circles for his ability to command and manage an army. Santoni also collected a large number of arms, mostly from Czechoslovakia, a close partner of the FLNC at the time.

In June 1985, Santoni was found guilty of terrorism for two bomb attacks on the Gravona region and sentenced to eight years in prison. Santoni was released in 1989 following the amnesty agreements between the FLNC and François Mitterrand's newly re-elected government, a piece of the incredibly controversial ceasefire agreement signed in May 1988 in order to make peace with the French government.

== Leadership of the FLNC-Canal Historique ==
In 1989, following Santoni's release, Santoni's radically militant base encouraged him to defy the May 1988 ceasefire, thus establishing himself as a dissident leader. In October 1990, Alain Orsoni was removed from his own party, A Cuncolta Naziunalista, and Santoni was placed as secretary-general of the party in Corse-du-Sud, his counterpart in Haute-Corse being Charles Pieri, a northern dissident leader. In November 1990, dissidents would invade the town of Borgo and declare the creation of the FLNC-Canal Historique (Corsican: FLNC-Canale Storicu, FLNC-CS). Santoni and Pieri became co-leaders of the group. The remaining members of the FLNC, gathered around Alain Orsoni, created the FLNC-Canal Habituel (FLNC-Canale Abituale, FLNC-CA), and began a war with the Historiques.

In September 1994, Santoni was arrested again for illegal possession of a firearm, and sentenced to six months in prison, with five months suspended. Santoni appealed the decision before fleeing authorities and hiding in the maquis.

Santoni's position as co-leader and his militant rhetoric made him a target of various assassination attempts during his time as leader. The first major attempt was on 29 May 1995, when an FLNC-CA assassination attempt in Suarella killed his political ally, Stefanu Gallo.

In January 1996, Santoni was placed in charge of overseeing FLNC-CS negotiations with the French government during the Tralonca peace campaign, a failed peace process between the two groups. Santoni would attempt multiple times to continue peace, but privately stated he had only believed in the peace process "for two weeks". During the peace process, Santoni was the target of another assassination attempt, resulting in the death of his bodyguard, Jules Massa. The process ultimately failed in October 1996, but Santoni would oppose the return to arms of the FLNC, stating the ceasefire should've been honoured "on principle". Santoni would later cite this as a reason for his departure from the FLNC.

In January 1997, Marie-Hélène Mattei, nationalist lawyer and Santoni's girlfriend, was arrested on charges of extortion. Santoni turned himself in for racketeering charges just 48 hours later, an action he described as a "matter of honour" he took in order to accompany his girlfriend. Both are transferred and held in prison in Paris. Santoni's July 1997 appeal and release are refused, causing a stir. The Ministry of Justice issues an appeal to heavily arm the guards around courthouses in Corsican territory to prevent attacks due to the refusal to release Santoni.

== Departure from the FLNC-CS and creation of Armata Corsa ==
On 8 September 1998, while imprisoned, Santoni resigned from the FLNC-CS and its political wing, A Cuncolta Naziunalista. Santoni claimed this was due to increasing polarization, the refusal to adhere to the ceasefires during the Tralonca peace campaign, and alleged mafia connections in Charles Pieri's inner circle. Santoni would found his own political party, Presenza Naziunale, the same day. Santoni would also break up with his girlfriend of 6 years, Marie-Hélène Mattei, due to her allegiance to A Cuncolta Naziunalista.

Santoni is released from prison on judicial supervision on 10 November 1998.

On 25 June 1999, Armata Corsa is founded by Santoni and his close friend and political ally, Jean-Michel Rossi. Armata Corsa becomes infamous as a violent, reckless organization, committing various racist attacks and kidnappings which earn it the label "terrorist". This violence, as well as Santoni's history with the FLNC-CS, gets it into a war with a coalition of other armed groups led by the FLNC-CS. Santoni's comments on the mafia would plunge him into a feud with the Brise de Mer mafia as well. These conflicts forced Santoni in an extreme state of paranoia, often explaining to reporters that he knows of alleged plots to kill him and that he is prepared to both die and avoid death.

== Assassination and legacy ==
Santoni was assassinated on 17 August 2001 while attending a wedding of a family friend in his hometown. He was shot 13 times by members of the Brise de Mer mafia.

Santoni's assassination ended the era of Corsican history known as the "years of lead", a period of violent infighting between armed groups. Santoni's legacy today is still quite controversial, seen as both a nationalist folk hero of sorts and a paranoid, mentally unstable, and violent individual.

French singer Renaud dedicated a song on his album Boucan d'enfer, Corsic'armes, to Santoni and his widow, Christelle.
