= Figari Reservoir =

Reservoir on Corsica, France

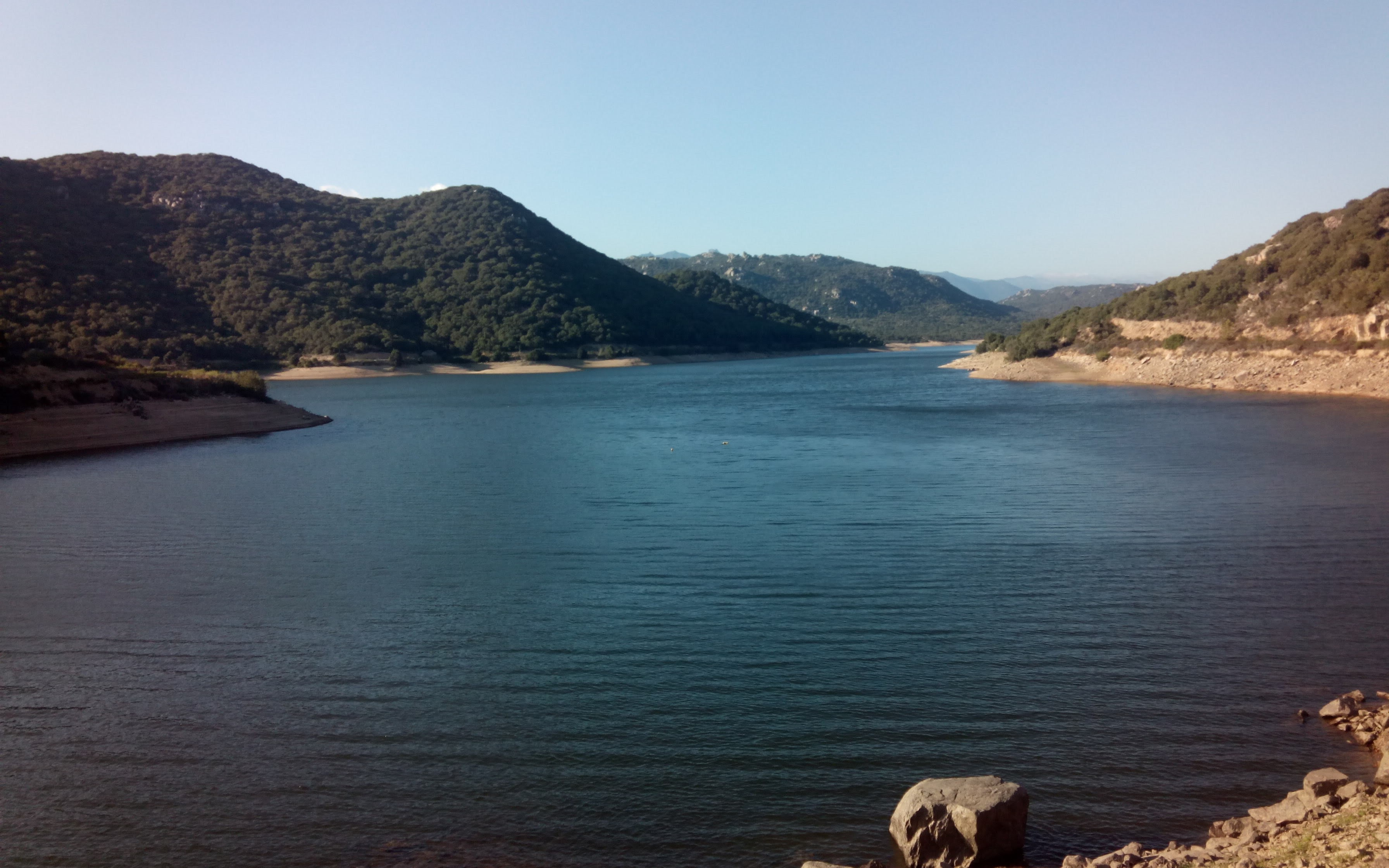

- Location within Corsica Location within France
- Location: Corse-du-Sud, Corsica
- Coordinates: 41.4658°N 9.1479°E
- Type: Lake
- Basin countries: France

The Figari Reservoir (French: Réservoir de Figari, Retenue de Figari, Lac de Talza, Lac de Ventilegne) is a reservoir in the Corse-du-Sud department of France on the island of Corsica. It provides water for irrigation and human consumption.

== Location ==
The Figari Reservoir is in the commune of Figari near the south coast of Corsica. It is southeast of the village of Figari. It is formed by a dam, the Barrage de Figari, that impounds the Ruisseau de Ventilegne. The reservoir supplies water for human consumption and for irrigation to the communes of Bonifacio, Figari, Pianottoli-Caldarello and Monacia-d'Aullène.

== Dam ==
The dam came into service in 1993 and is operated by the Office d’Equipement Hydraulique de Corse (OEHC). It is a riprap structure 35 metres (115 ft) high and 145 metres (476 ft) long with a crest elevation of 52 metres (171 ft). It holds 5,600,000 cubic metres (200,000,000 cu ft) of water. The reservoir has a surface area of 68 hectares (170 acres) and is fed by a drainage basin of 16.2 square kilometres (6.3 sq mi). The waterbody, dam and facilities occupy about 87 hectares (210 acres) in the commune of Figari, but include 5,200 square metres (56,000 sq ft) in the municipality of Bunifaziu, which holds the pumping station.

== Developments ==
In December 2002 it was reported that the Agence de l'eau Rhône-Méditerranée-Corse had provided up to 600,000 euros to the OEHC so it could install a water intake on the Orgone river from which it could supply additional water to the Figari reservoir. Implementation was planned for the fall of 2003.

In 2018 the OEHC scheduled work to renew the 500 millimetres (20 in) steel pipeline downstream from the Figari dam and to replace a defective 350 millimetres (14 in) valve in the pumping station. As of 2019 the OEHC was planning substantial upgrades to the spillway so it could handle a 10,000 year flood. There were also considering a hydroelectric power plant on the filling pipe of the reservoir, and considering floating solar panels.

The Extrême-Sud region consumed over 240,000 cubic metres (8,500,000 cu ft) of water per week in August 2020, considerably higher than the ten-year average and caused more by high heat than by tourism, which was down that year. The Figari and Ospedale reservoirs are the only two storage structures for the region, with a combined capacity of 9,000,000 cubic metres (320,000,000 cu ft), not enough to meet future needs. There were plans to expand the pipeline from the Figari dam north to the Nota water treatment station and to increase the capacity of the Figari reservoir by 1,500,000 cubic metres (53,000,000 cu ft). Plans also included building a dam on the Cavu to store 5,000,000 cubic metres (180,000,000 cu ft) of water.

== Sources ==
- Amar, Nadia (3 September 2020), "L'Extrême-Sud face aux enjeux hydrauliques", Corse Matin (in French)
- Bassin de Corse : Fiches détaillées par masses d'eau (PDF) (in French), Agence de l'eau, 15 October 2014
- Chantier de renouvellement des conduites en acier du barrage de Figari (in French), OEHC, 2018
- Corse : Barrage de Figari (in French), CFBR Comité Français des Barrages et Réservoirs
- "Des barrages pour mieux gérer l'eau en Corse et en Sardaigne", LesEchos (in French), 27 December 2002
- Luciani, Saveriu (2019), Reponse de Monsieur Saveriu Luciani a la question deposee par Madame Julie Guiseppi au nom du groupe Corsica Libera (PDF) (in French), Collectivité de Corse
- "Way: Réservoir de Figari (28890165)", OpenStreetMap
