= Marie-Antoinette Maupertuis =

French politician (born 1967)

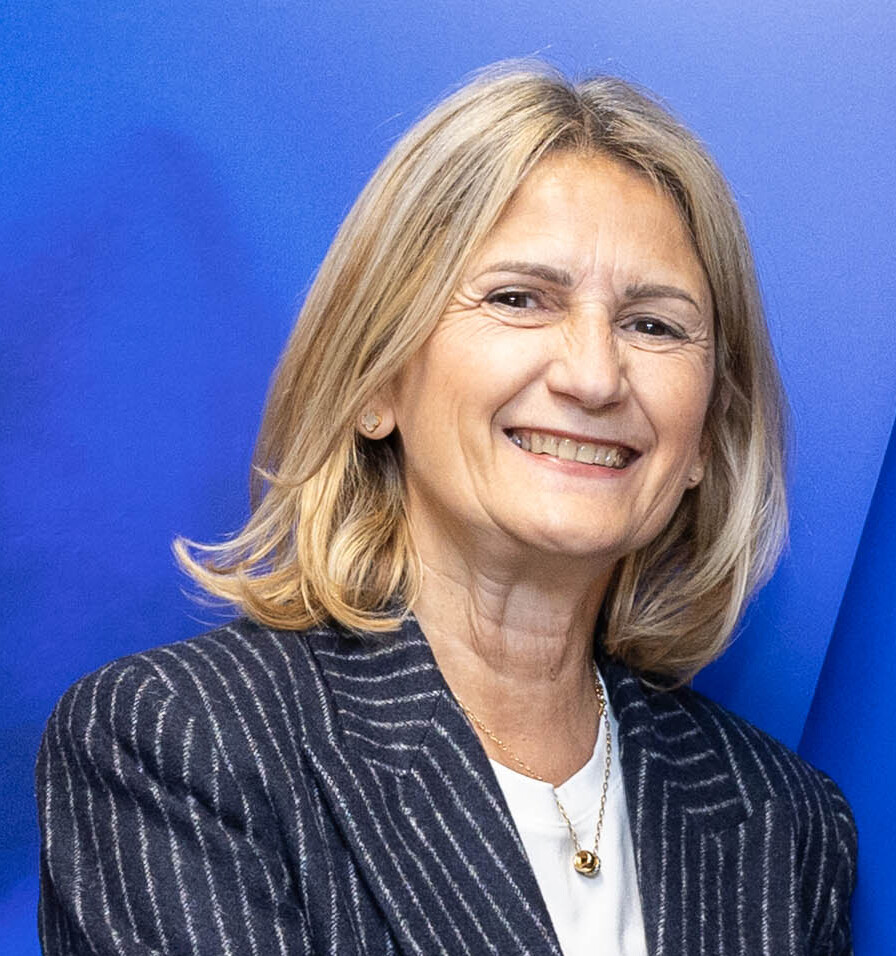
- Marie-Antoinette Maupertuis in 2026.

President of the Corsican Assembly
- Incumbent
- Assumed office 1 July 2021
- Preceded by: Jean-Guy Talamoni

Regional Councillor of the Corsican Assembly
- Incumbent
- Assumed office 1 July 2021
- In office 2 January 2018 – 18 January 2018
- In office 17 December 2015 – 12 January 2016

Executive Councillor of Corsica
- In office 17 December 2015 – 1 July 2021
- President: Gilles Simeoni

Personal details
- Born: 10 April 1967 (age 59)
- Party: Femu a Corsica

Marie-Antoinette Maupertuis (French pronunciation: [maʁi ɑ̃twanɛt mopɛʁtɥi]; born 10 April 1967), also called Nanette Maupertuis, is a French politician and academic practicing in Corsica.

Elected councilor to the Corsican assembly on Gilles Simeoni's list in the 2015 elections, she was re-elected in 2017 and 2021. She was elected president of the deliberative body of the Corsican community following the 2021 election.

== Biography ==
=== Personal items and career ===
Marie-Antoinette Maupertuis, known as "Nanette", followed university training in economics, which she suspended to exercise the function of parliamentary attaché to Max Simeoni in Brussels.

In 2016, she was professor of economics at the University of Corsica and there directed the research laboratory in human and social sciences of the National Centre for Scientific Research.

=== Political career ===
Number two on Gilles Simeoni's list (Femu a Corsica), she was elected councilor to the Corsican assembly following the 2015 election. However, during the installation session of the mandate held on 17 December 2015, she was appointed member of the Corsican executive council under the direction of Gilles Simeoni. She was entrusted with the presidency of the Corsica Tourism Agency (ATC) as well as the field of European affairs.

In view of the election of the Corsican assembly of December 2017, Marie-Antoinette Maupertuis is once again second on Gilles Simeoni's list, this time led as part of the Pè a Corsica coalition bringing together autonomists and nationalists. She was elected a few weeks before the creation of the collectivity of Corsica on 1 January 2018, resulting from the merger of the departments of Corse-du-Sud and Haute-Corse with the territorial community of Corsica. Her portfolio remained associated with the management of ATC, but it expands to European and international affairs, public innovation policy and the smart specialization strategy.

Unlike the previous election, the autonomists and the nationalists did not form a coalition in the Corsican assembly elections in 2021. Also, coming first in the first and second rounds, Gilles Simeoni's "Fà populu inseme" list obtained the absolute majority in the Assembly with 32 of the 63 seats. Under this new mandate, she was elected president of the Corsican assembly by her peers on the day of her installation, on 1 July 2021.
