= Torra d'Ulmetu =

Genoese coastal defence tower in Corsica

Tower of Ulmetu
- Torra d'Ulmetu (Corsican)
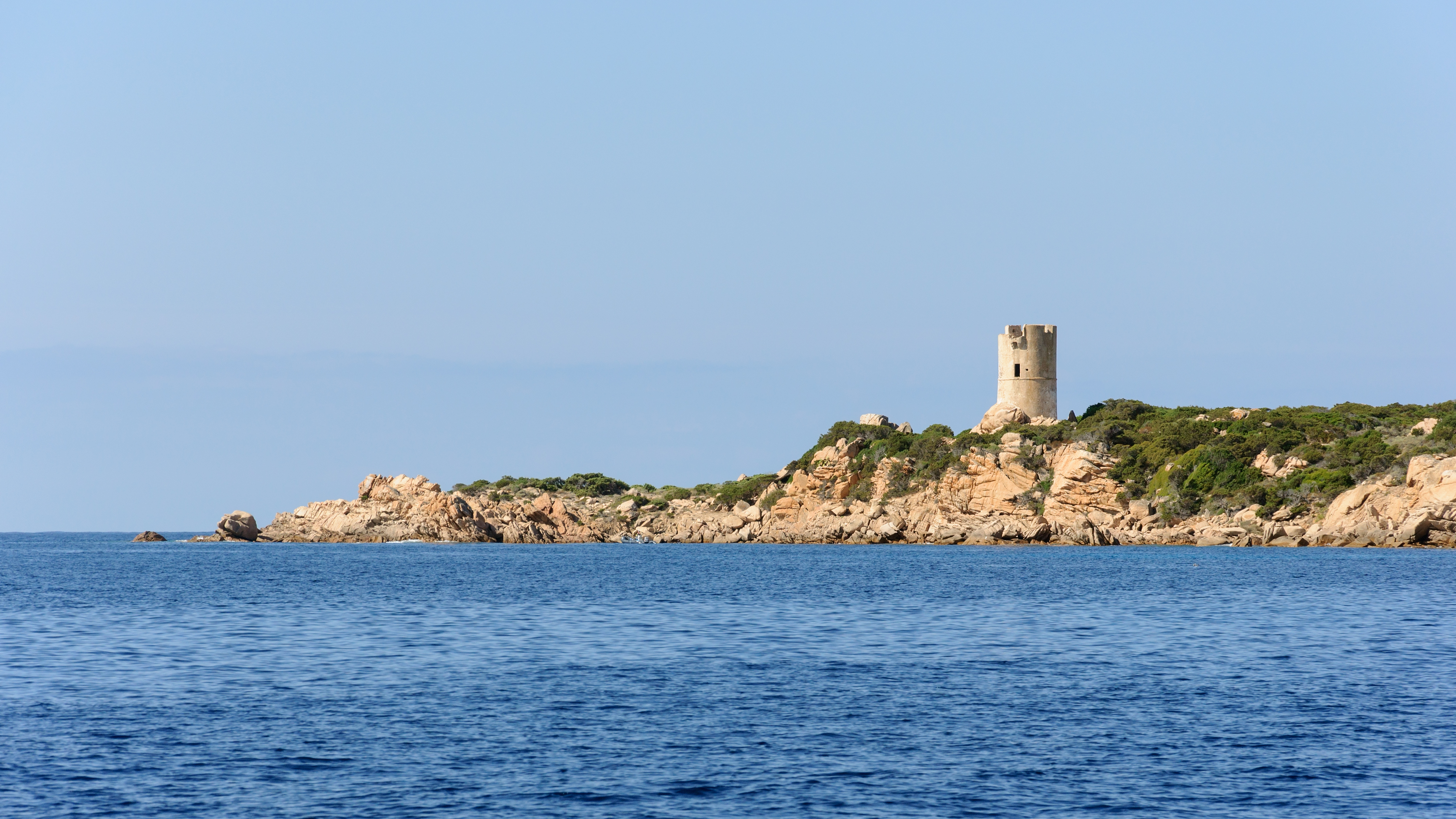

- Location within Corsica
- 41°28′31″N 8°59′3″E

History
- Built: Second half of 16th century

The Tower of Ulmetu (Corsican: Torra d'Ulmetu) is a ruined Genoese tower located in the commune of Monacia-d'Aullène on the west coast of the French island of Corsica. The tower sits on the Punta di Caniscione headland.

The tower was one of a series of coastal defences constructed by the Republic of Genoa between 1530 and 1620 to stem the attacks by Barbary pirates.

== See also ==
- List of Genoese towers in Corsica
