= Tralonca peace campaign =

1996 negotiations in Corsica and France

- Part of the Years of lead period of the Corsican conflict
- Date: 10 January 1996 - 12 October 1996
- Location: Corsica and mainland France
- Goals: Peace between the FLNC-CS and the French Government; Eventual peace in Corsica
- Result: Failure: French officials refuse to adhere to amnesty agreements; Historiques break the ceasefire and do not renew it

Parties
France: Council of Ministers; Loyalist councilors in the Corsican Assembly	FLNC-Canal Historique: A Cuncolta Naziunalista

Lead figures
Jacques Chirac; Alain Juppé; Jean-Louis Debré; Jacques Toubon; Claude Érignac	Charles Pieri; François Santoni; Jean-Guy Talamoni; Pierre Lorenzi; Jean-Dominique Allegrini-Simonetti

Casualties
- Arrested: 28 arrests of FLNC-CS and A Cuncolta Naziunalista members during the peace process

The Tralonca peace campaign was a 10-month period of negotiations and an attempted settlement between the government of France and the National Liberation Front of Corsica-Canal Historique (Fronte di Liberazione Naziunale di a Corsica-Canale Storicu, FLNC-CS), the largest Corsican paramilitary group at the time. The agreements were meant to bring stability to a then war-ridden Corsica in hopes of an eventual peace with all of the factions present during the period. This was to be achieved through greater autonomy within Corsica, economic growth through the establishment of an economic free zone, and infrastructure developments. The project was spearheaded by French prime minister Alain Juppé and FLNC-CS co-leader François Santoni.

The agreements failed largely due to the unwillingness of the French authorities to accept amnesty proposals and cease arrests of alleged FLNC-CS members, as well as Juppé’s general hostility towards Corsican separatists. Ceasefire agreements were due to be renewed on 12 October, but the ceasefire was broken on 9 October when the FLNC-CS committed a large bomb attack on the town hall of Bordeaux, a town Juppé was the mayor of during his tenure as prime minister. The process was interrupted multiple times due to wars between nationalist groups, most notably resulting in the death of an FLNC-CS officer and president of A Cuncolta Naziunalista, Pierre Lorenzi, who was assassinated by members of the rival FLNC-5 May.

== Process ==
On 6 January 1996, the French newspaper Libération reported the discovery of secret negotiations between French government officials and FLNC-CS officials. This coincided with minister of the interior Jean-Louis Debré announcing the “situation” in Corsica to be a priority for the year. On 10 January 1996, the process officially began when the FLNC-CS held a press conference in the occupied town of Tralonca and declared a truce of 3 months, with the possibility to renew the peace if negotiations continued with positive progress.

The beginning of a peace process worried many loyalists in the Corsican Assembly that concessions would be made regarding the status of Corsica. Thus, on 16 January, a group of loyalist councilors paid a personal visit to prime minister Alain Juppé, expressing their opposition to institutional change in Corsica. In the National Assembly, Jean-Louis Debré and Alain Juppé were harshly criticized by conservative deputies for negotiating with the FLNC-CS, whom they perceived as “terrorists”.

On 9 February, minister of justice Jacques Toubon visited Corsica to discuss the peace process and assess the situation. His visit was the subject of unrest, with two bomb attacks occurring just hours before his arrival.

On 12 March, Debré intervened in the National Assembly to respond to accusations regarding hid negiation with the FLNC-CS. Debré would continue to run into conflict with deputies of the National Assembly during the entire process.

On 27 March, Juppé declared during a meeting with various deputies that Corsica was going to become a free economic zone, starting that summer. This was done to alleviate the economic stress of the island. In the end, it took until October for the plan to be ratified, and it was never implemented. Corsica today is still one of the least developed regions in all of France.

On 12 April, the FLNC-CS officially renews its truce for another 6 months. The deadline is now 12 October.

A sore spot in negotiations occurs on 16 April. Two members of A Cuncolta Naziunalista, the political wing of the FLNC-CS, get into a firefight with two police officers. One officer is killed, one member of A Cuncolta is killed, and the other two are injured. A Cuncolta issued a meeting on the topic the next day, attempting to open dialogue. The French government, however, begins a wave of arrests targeting A Cuncolta officials. This continues into May.

On 16 May, the FLNC-CS issued an ultimatum to the police: “Militants threatened with arrest will respond with weapons”. This is disregarded, and the next day a major figure in A Cuncolta, Jean-Dominique Allegrini, is arrested.

On 28 May, Alain Juppé holds a meeting with the National Assembly where he declares Corsica to be a “double priority” for his government. He ends his speech with “Corsica is France”, sparking protests.

On 25 June, A Cuncolta Naziunalista begins a series of protests at courthouses across Corsica demanding the release of the A Cuncolta members arrested during the first wave of arrests. On 29 June, a protests to implement the free economic zone plan is supported by A Cuncolta.

On 11 July, Debré visits Ajaccio discreetly to discuss with the island's law enforcement.

On 17 July, Alain Juppé visits Corsica. The visit is meant to rejuvenate the relationship between island officials and Paris, but Juppé describes a “depressed” island. Many residents state that they are losing hope for the future of the peace deals.

On 3 August, the second wave of arrests begin. Many members of A Cuncolta are arrested and moved to Paris for trial. This one lasts the entire month of August.

On 5 August, Claude Érignac, prefect of Corsica, held a meeting where he requested exceptions for search and seizure laws in Corsica to prevent further armed conflict.

On 21 August, François Santoni harshly criticized Juppé and the state of the peace deals in the weekly editorial U Ribombu.

By the beginning of September, 7 A Cuncolta Naziunalista members remain in police custody, and many have been sentenced to prison. Many more were arrested throughout september, bringing the total number to around 30 arrests of separate individuals, though many members were arrested more than once.

On 5 October, the FLNC-Canal Historique, against the words of Santoni, prematurely ended the truce by committing a large bomb attack on the city hall of Bordeaux, Palais Rohan. This building was chosen because Juppé was also mayor of Bordeaux during his time as prime minister. The building is severely damaged. On 7 October, the FLNC-CS claimed the attack. The government responded by issuing a statement claiming it would fight Corsican terrorism “without failure”. The truce ended officially on 12 October.

== Outside intervention ==
Throughout the peace process, other organizations attempted many times to put an end to the negotiations. This was largely due to the "years of lead", an ongoing civil war between various nationalist factions.

On 16 February 1996, a high-ranking FLNC-CS member, Jules Massa, was shot dead in Ajaccio by a joint commando of FLNC-Canal Habituel (Canal Abituale, FLNC-CA) and Resistenza members. François Santoni, co-leader of the FLNC-CS, was next to Massa when the attack occurred, and was likely the true target of the attack. Santoni personally denounces these two groups during his 28 February trial after his arrest. On 18 February, the FLNC-CS respond by assassinating Charles "Charly" Andreani, a Resistenza member.

On 8 March, a machine-gun attack targeted the home of Guy Benhamou, a journalist for the newspaper Libération, an expert on Corsican affairs, and a pro-peace activist. This attack caused Jean-Louis Debré to personally request police protection for Benhamou and his home. On 13 March, Santoni and fellow FLNC-CS co-leader Charles Pieri issued a condemnation for the attack.

On 12 March, Alain Orsoni, leader of the FLNC-CA, denounced the peace deal between the FLNC-CS and the French government. On 8 April, the FLNC-CA declared an adherence to Corsican autonomy and reject the ideas of Corsican independence. This controversial decision caused members of the FLNC-CA’s political wing, the Movement for Self-determination, to leave and create Corsica Viva, a new political party, earlier in the year, on 3 March.

On 22 March, an FLNC-CS commando operation attempted to destroy the offices of Habituel Gilbert Casanova. The commando was found by police, and two of the three members were arrested.

On 2 April, Fronte Ribellu carried out an attack against a large number of targets, mostly focused on gendarmeries. Fronte Ribellu split from the FLNC-CS a year prior.

On 5 May, the FLNC-CA announces a ceasefire of their own and an “imminent self-dissolution”. The date was chosen symbolically, as it was 20 years to the day of the formation of the original FLNC in 1976. This decision was implemented to promote a peace in Corsica led by the habituels. This, however, causes a group of members to seize most of the weapons from the habituels and create the FLNC-5 May (FLNC-5 Maghju, FLNC-5M).

On 1 July, Charles Pieri and president of A Cuncolta Naziunalista Pierre Lorenzi were the victim of a carbomb attack from the FLNC-5M. Lorenzi was killed, but Pieri survived, although he lost his right eye and part of his hearing.

== Aftermath ==
The aftermath of the Bordeaux attack saw large-scale escalation from the Historiques in an attempt to relaunch its campaign even stronger than before. Meanwhile, Fronte Ribellu began organizing and advocating a “general uprising” against French rule in Corsica. This coincided with a series of anti-violence protests across France regarding the failure of the peace process.

On 17 October 1996, the FLNC-CS committed two large bomb attacks in Nîmes, targeting the local tax office and the courthouse. Later that same day, the Bastia courthouse was bombed as well.

Also on 17 October, Alain Juppé held a meeting with interior minister Jean-Louis Debré, defense minister Charles Millon, and justice minister Jacques Toubon, where a plan of action regarding Corsica was heavily discussed. Shortly after the meeting, a judicial investigation is opened into the FLNC-CS guerrillas present in Tralonca during the initial press conference on 10 January. The FLNC responds:

“Following the threats of arrest for the Tralonca press conference, we declare to the emissary of the Élysée as well as to prime minister Juppé that our organization is prepared to participate in the manifestation of truth by giving the necessary explanation to the conditions of organization of this press conference and the response which was made regarding it. Let us warn Juppé against any attempt at elimination [of our organization]. The response would be of unexpected scale.”

— 18 October 1996 FLNC-CS press release

On 22 October, a parliamentary committee on the FLNC-CS was officially formed, composed of 40 members, none of which are deputies or senators from Corsica.

On 24 October, a wave of arrests are made targeting various nationalist officials in mainland France and Corsica. The FLNC-CS responds with a series of large-scale, violent attacks targeting police.

== Influence and legacy ==
The events in Tralonca left a lasting impression on Corsican politics and the wider Corsican conflict. It is often cited as a major reason for the large-scale criticism against the Juppé government, specifically interior minister Jean-Louis Debré and Alain Juppé himself. This, combined with a large amount of other grievances, notably the 1995 strikes, led to Alain Juppé and his cabinet resigning after the 1997 parliamentary snap elections in which his party, Rally for the Republic, lost a large amount of seats. The FLNC-CS attempted to open dialogue with the new Jospin government by calling a truce in May 1997, but the truce ended very quickly after the government never responded and the FLNC-5M attempted to sabotage the new peace by committing attacks and claiming them to be the work of the FLNC-CS.

Jospin, however, would go on to attempt to create peace in Corsica. Tralonca's failure influenced the creation of the Matignon agreements, a series of negotiations between nationalist organizations, both military and political, and the government, which began in November 1999.

Tralonca's failure is a contributing factor to the major, “war-like” escalation of the conflict from 1996-2000. It raised more conflicts with the “warlord” groups fighting in Corsica, which would continue until the end of the years of lead in 2001. This conflict was a major part of the road to the assassination of Claude Érignac, who was a major figure in the Tralonca process as the prefect of Corsica.

The failure of the Tralonca peace campaign was cited by François Santoni as one of the many reasons for his departure from the FLNC-CS and his creation of Armata Corsa. Santoni claimed the ceasefire, though he disagreed with the state of it at the time, should’ve been honored “on principle”.
