= Canton of Grand Sud =

Coordinates: 41.54°N 9.28°E

The canton of Grand Sud is an administrative division of the Corse-du-Sud department, southeastern France. It was created by the French canton reorganisation which came into effect in March 2015. Its seat is in Porto-Vecchio.

It consists of the following communes:

1. Bonifacio
2. Carbini
3. Figari
4. Levie
5. Monacia-d'Aullène
6. Pianottoli-Caldarello
7. Porto-Vecchio (partly)
8. Sotta
