= Petit Bar Gang =

Corsican organized crime group

- Founded: 2000s
- Founding location: Corsica, Ajaccio
- Years active: 2000s-present
- Territory: France (including Corsica, Marseille and Paris), Italy, Luxemburg, Malta, Switzerland, Hong Kong
- Ethnicity: People of Corsican descent
- Membership: several dozen members
- Criminal activities: Racketeering, gambling, loan sharking, money laundering, extortion, bribery, fraud, corruption, management of hotels, night clubs and casinos
- Rivals: Mattei clan, Movement for Self-Determination (Orsoni clan)

The Petit Bar Gang is an organized crime group from Corsica. It gets its name from the "Petit Bar," an establishment in Ajaccio (on the cours Napoléon), owned by Ange-Marie Michelosi, a lieutenant of Jean-Jérôme Colonna, from whose gang it is said to originate.

Having engaged in extortion against merchants and being active in the Greater Ajaccio region, on the mainland, and abroad, it was presented in 2022 as the most powerful criminal group in Corsica, the only one to have succeeded in creating a network of political and economic influence of a mafia.

== History ==
=== Timeline ===
- May 2007: Four alleged members are arrested; Thirty years old, children of merchants or civil servants, they have no known links with the Corsican separatists. The band owes its name to the "Petit Bar" of Ajaccio, property of Ange-Marie Michelosi, lieutenant of Jean-Jérôme Colonna.
- 8 July 2008: Ange-Marie Michelosi is assassinated in Grosseto-Prugna (Porticcio).
- 21 April 2011: Marie-Jeanne Bozzi (ex-mayor of Grosseto-Prugna), sister of Ange-Marie Michelosi, is assassinated.
- 3 October 2013: Jacques Santoni, presented as the leader of the gang, is arrested. Suspected of having ordered the assassination of Antoine Nivaggioni in 2010 and Antoine Sollacaro in 2012, as well as an attempted murder against Charles Cervoni, he is on trial in 2018. Jacques Santoni is again mentioned in 2019 as a possible accomplice during the trial of two men accused of the murder of Antoine Nivaggioni; they are condemned respectively to 25 and 10 years of prison without the responsibility of Jacques Santoni having been established.
- 13 September 2018: Attempted assassination of Guy Orsoni, son of Alain Orsoni and nephew of Guy Orsoni, in Ajaccio.
- 23 October 2020: Jacques Pastini, Philippe Porri and Jean-Laurent Salasca are sentenced to two years in prison for "complicity in damaging or damaging the property of others by a means dangerous for people" for the fire at Le Globo restaurant on 22 September 2017 in Ajaccio.
- 28 September 2020: A police operation is organized against the Petit Bar team as part of the investigation into the attempted assassination of Guy Orsoni. Three informed members manage to flee: Pascal Porri, Mickaël Ettori and André Bacchiolelli. Joseph Menconi, suspected of providing logistical assistance in an attempted assassination of Guy Orsoni, was allowed to make a phone call from an investigator's cell phone. Jacques Santoni was indicted on 30 September 2020 for "complicity in homicide in an organized gang" and "criminal association."
- 10 January 2021: Twenty people were arrested as part of an investigation by JIRS Marseille into the laundering of 48 million euros. Jacques Santoni is indicted and imprisoned.
- 16 January 2021: A police officer was taken into custody. He was suspected of being the "mole" who informed the gang members of the police operation of 28 September 2020. The police officer was finally released, “without any charges being brought against him”.

=== Assassination of Antoine Sollacaro ===
Members of the gang are suspected in the assassination of the lawyer Antoine Sollacaro, former president of the bar of Ajaccio, defender of the nationalist Yvan Colonna and Alain Orsoni. In April 2013, André Bacchiolelli and Mickaël Ettori were indicted for this assassination and Pascal Porri for "criminal association and concealment of motorcycle theft". These prosecutions were cancelled in 2014 by the Aix-en-Provence investigating chamber, after the retraction of a witness, the mechanic who had identified the three men and the motorcycle used in the murder.

In 2015, Patrick Giovannoni, a former close friend of the gang, told the judge that Jacques Santoni had told him that they were indeed the perpetrators of the crime. Jacques Santoni and André Bacchiolelli are again indicted. The case is still under investigation and the accused benefit from the presumption of innocence.

=== Attempted assassination of Alain Orsoni (2008) ===
Six men close to the Petit Bar gang, including Stéphane Raybier, were sentenced in 2011 by the Marseille court to prison terms for having wanted to assassinate the former nationalist leader Alain Orsoni in 2008 in Ajaccio.

=== Attempted assassination of Guy Orsoni (2018) ===
This band is suspected of an assassination attempt in September 2018 of Guy Orsoni, son of Alain Orsoni, former leader of the Movement for Self-Determination (MPA), and nephew of Guy Orsoni (assassinated on 17 June 1983).

On September 28, 2020, a wave of arrests took place in Corsica in the context of this case. Jacques Santoni was indicted on September 30, 2020 for "criminal conspiracy to commit a crime". Philippe Porri is also indicted. Two others in custody, François Kay and Ange-Marie Gaffory, were already in detention.

Leaks from the police allow Pascal Porri, Mickaël Ettori and André Bacchiolelli to escape. The magistrates of the JIRS of Marseille discovered that members of the judicial police of Corsica and the office for the fight against organized crime had left Joseph Menconi (known as "José"), a member of Corsican banditry placed in police custody, phone from the police station to his companion. His phone line had been tapped by JIRS for another case. This incident led to the relinquishment of the Corsican judicial police to the benefit of the gendarmerie in this case and to the departure of several police officers from the Corsican judicial police.

=== Recent Developments ===
In July 2025, a report by the French police intelligence unit SIRASCO, cited by Le Monde, indicated that organized crime in Corsica was undergoing a "major recomposition". According to the report, around twenty criminal groups operate on the island under "mafia-style control", with significant infiltration of political, economic and social sectors, including construction, hospitality, transport and real estate. The report identified the Petit Bar Gang as one of the two dominant blocs in this evolving landscape, alongside a coalition associated with the Mattei clan, which brings together groups from different regions of Corsica. Authorities noted that the balance of power between these blocs remained fragile and could lead to renewed violent conflict.

== Presumed members ==
- André Bacchiolelli (known as “Dédé”). Arrested on 5 July 2021 in Ajaccio and indicted on counts of attempted intentional homicide in an organized gang, criminal association and concealment in an organized gang and imprisoned.
- Johann Carta (nicknamed "the steward of the Petit Bar"). Manager of the beach hut "La Plage d’Argent." He is believed to play a pivotal role in the real estate and commercial affairs of the gang. Since 2022, he has been the president of the professional football club "Gazélec d’Ajaccio" (GFCA).
- Mickael Ettori (known as "Micka"). Fled in 2020.
- Ange-Marie Gaffory. He is said to be close to the investor Stéphane Francisci, from the family of Marcel and Roland Francisci.
- Ange-Marie Michelosi, former manager of the Petit Bar, murdered on July 8, 2008, in Grosseto-Prugna (Porticcio).
- Pierre-François Luccioni, former manager of the Petit Bar.
- Jacques Pastini
- Pascal Porri (called "the bulb"). Sentenced in 2011 to six years in prison for "participation in a criminal association." Sentenced in 2019 to sixteen months in prison for concealing embezzlement of corporate assets and money laundering with his wife Valérie Mouren and entrepreneur Antony Perrino. He was arrested on September 15, 2021, in Porto Vecchio.
- Philippe Porri
- Stéphane Raybier, childhood friend of Jacques Santoni and founding member of the gang. He committed suicide in prison in February 2021.
- Jean-Laurent Salasca
- Jacques Santoni (Born on February 4, 1978, in Ajaccio). He left school at 16 and worked for a time with his father in the restaurant business. Married and father of two children, he has been tetraplegic since a motorcycle accident in 2003 and received an adult disability allowance of 2,000 euros per month in 2013. He was placed in police custody on January 10, 2021, while under house arrest in Paris. Jacques Santoni was indicted and placed in detention for aggravated money laundering, criminal association, and failure to justify resources. He allegedly laundered 2.3 million euros through a lottery win of 4.6 million euros by his brother-in-law Jean-Laurent Susini.

== Activities ==
- Extortion of funds
- Drug trafficking
- Suspected assassination attempts
- Money laundering: An investigation into money laundering and 48 million euros of suspicious investments is ongoing.

== Political links ==
- Ange-Marie Michelosi, owner of the Petit Bar and murdered in 2008, is the brother of Marie-Jeanne Bozzi, former mayor of Grosseto-Prugna, assassinated in 2011.
- According to the newspaper Le Monde, Johann Carta allegedly exerted pressure on opponents to the mayor of Ajaccio from 2014 to 2022, Laurent Marcangeli.
- On October 3, 2022, the judicial police of Corsica raided the premises of the city hall of Ajaccio and the agglomeration community of the Ajaccio region (CAPA). It is investigating the legality of employment contracts established for the benefit of relatives of alleged members of the "Petit Bar" gang.

== Business links ==
=== Antony Perrino ===
Antony Perrino, head of the Perrino real estate group. He was president of the BTP federation of Southern Corsica from March 2018 to March 2019 and former CEO of the newspaper Corse Matin. Mr. Perrino owns the restaurant "La Ferme" on the island of Cavallo with the Filippeddu family.

Antony Perrino, Pascal Porri, and his partner Valérie Mouren were prosecuted for embezzlement of corporate assets and money laundering in connection with a high-end apartment located on Boulevard Albert Ier in Ajaccio, rented below market price in favor of Pascal Porri and his partner. In the first instance, Antony Perrino was fined 15,000 euros by the criminal court of Ajaccio. They were scheduled for appeal on January 27, 2021.

Micka Ettori, Antony Perrino, and the real estate developer A. M. met on December 10, 2019, to discuss transactions in Luxembourg and Malta for respectively "more than 300,000 euros" and "more than 700,000 euros." For Antony Perrino, this would be the repayment of a loan granted by A. M. to Jules Filippeddu, a restaurateur in Bonifacio and fortunate operator of slot machines in Brazil.

Antony Perrino was again taken into custody and then incarcerated at the Luynes prison in January 2021 in connection with his alleged links to the Petit Bar gang. Anthony Perrino is said to have participated in the laundering of 48 million euros of suspicious investments. He also allegedly transported 750,000 euros in cash to fuel suspicious financial flows between Dubai, Singapore, and China.

=== Jean-Pierre Valentini ===
Close to Antony Perrino and originally from Corte, Jean-Pierre Valentini was one of the executives of the oil brokerage and maritime chartering company Trafigura, created in 1993 by students of Marc Rich, Claude Dauphin, and Eric de Turckheim, and involved in the 2006 Probo Koala affair. In this case, Jean-Pierre Valentini had been imprisoned in Ivory Coast with two other executives and had regained freedom after an agreement with the Ivorian presidency.

In 2014, Jean-Pierre Valentini became the financial director and secretary-general of a Luxembourg bank. Formerly residing in Switzerland, Jean-Pierre Valentini is now based in Dubai, United Arab Emirates. He is an oil consultant and owns a racing stable in the United Arab Emirates.

In 2018, he partnered with Antony Perrino for a luxury hotel construction project on the island of Cavallo in Corsica and a "micro-luxury hotel."

In December 2019, Jean-Pierre Valentini made payments to the benefit of a real estate developer ("A. M.") investing in La Trétoire (Seine-et-Marne) and Paris 8th, an intermediary suspected of the Petit Bar gang.

In March 2019, Antony Perrino asked Jean-Pierre Valentini to invest 1.4 million euros in the SCI "Du toit du garage" for the construction and rental of chalets in Courchevel, then 1.92 million euros.

On February 3, 2021, Jean-Pierre Valentini was indicted for organized money laundering and criminal association. His detention was refused by the judge of liberties and detention. A bail of two million euros was decided. His passport was withdrawn due to the risk of fleeing abroad. He was questioned about suspicious financial flows between Dubai and Singapore, financial operations in China, cash deliveries via a laundering network in Aubervilliers (Seine-Saint-Denis), and purchases of valuables (watches, paintings). He claims to have been "duped" by the Petit Bar team.

=== Francisci Family ===
- Micka Ettori is said to be close to investor Stéphane Francisci, from the family of Marcel and Roland Francisci.

== Financial aspect ==
=== Tax havens ===
48 million euros were laundered into various assets: offshore investments, real estate, and hospitality. This laundering was carried out through covert financial flows to tax havens such as Hong Kong, Luxembourg, or Malta. In September 2020, raids were conducted in Corsica, mainland France, and Switzerland.

=== Courchevel ===
In March 2019, Mickaël Ettori, known as "Micka," a member of this group, and Antony Perrino, a Corsican entrepreneur, invested in real estate in Courchevel (Savoie). In 2019, Jean-Pierre Valentini, close to Antony Perrino, contributed 1.2 million euros to the SCI "Du toit du garage," involved in the construction and rental of chalets. JPV invested in the SCI "Du toit du garage" with François-Xavier Susini, domiciled in Switzerland, former manager of the nightclub Les Caves de Courchevel and manager of several restaurants.

=== Luxembourg ===
In 2019, French authorities investigated the links between Mickaël Ettori and Jean-Marc Peretti, former manager of the Paris gambling club L’Industrie and minority shareholder of the Luxembourg free port who in 2008 was involved in investigations related to money laundering and financial fraud. On May 22, 2019, a €2 million transfer was made to an "unidentified" account, then transferred to the account of an offshore company whose details were provided by Mickaël Ettori. According to the court documents, Peretti received a €2 million loan payment, which triggered alerts by anti-money laundering authorities following an attempt to reroute the funds to Hong Kong. A group of three people consisting of Mickaël Ettori, Antony Perrino, and a financial intermediary ("A.M.") mentioned on December 10, 2019, two financial transfers to Luxembourg and Malta for more than 300,000 euros and 700,000 euros respectively.
