= Sotta =

Commune in Corsica, France

Sotta Sotta
- Commune
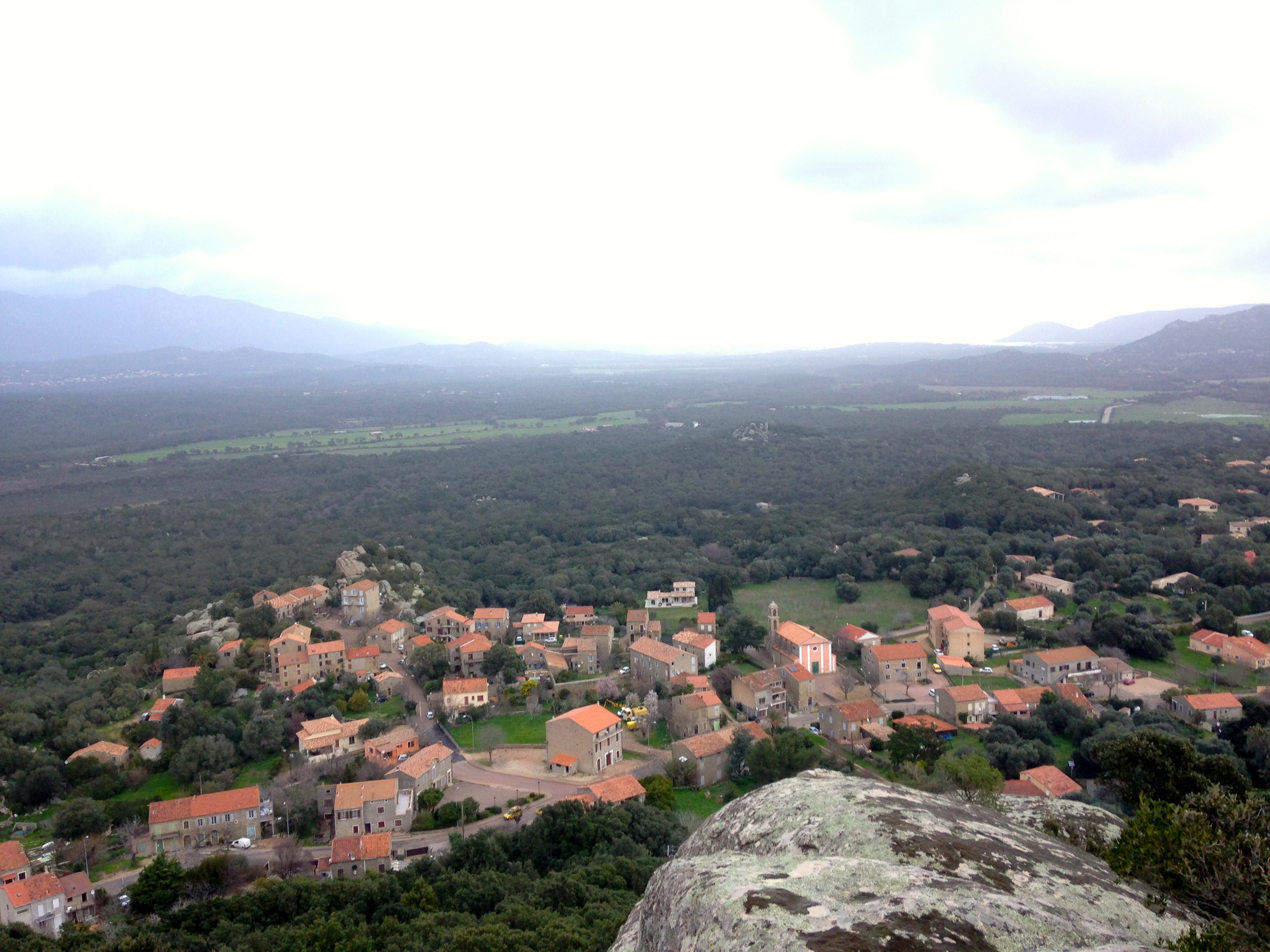
- A panoramic view of Sotta from Punta
- Location of Sotta
- Location within France Location within Corsica
- Coordinates: 41°32′44″N 9°11′44″E
- Country: France
- Region: Corsica
- Department: Corse-du-Sud
- Arrondissement: Sartène
- Canton: Grand Sud

Government
  - Mayor (2020–2026): Jean-Marc Serra
- Area^{1}: 67 km^{2} (26 sq mi)
- Elevation: 100 m (330 ft)
- Highest elevation: 1,298 m (4,259 ft)
- Lowest elevation: 17 m (56 ft)
- Population (2023): 1,893
  - Density: 28/km^{2} (73/sq mi)
- Time zone: UTC+01:00 (CET)
  - Summer (DST): UTC+02:00 (CEST)
- INSEE/Postal code: 2A288 /20146
- ^{1} French Land Register data, which excludes lakes, ponds, glaciers > 1 km^{2} (0.386 sq mi or 247 acres) and river estuaries.

Sotta (Corsican pronunciation: [ˈsɔtːa]) is a commune in the French department of Corse-du-Sud, on the island of Corsica. It is one of communes in the canton of Grand Sud.

== Geography ==
Sotta is 15 kilometres (9 mi) to the northeast of the commune of Figari on the road to Porto-Vecchio; it was created in 1853. The territory includes part of 1,299 metres (4,262 ft) Mount Cagna to the northwest; the remainder is in a plain scattered with hamlets, vines and groves of Cork Oak and Eucalyptus.

== Population ==
Historical population
Year	Pop.	±% p.a.
1968	578	—
1975	683	+2.41%
1982	726	+0.88%
1990	762	+0.61%
1999	808	+0.65%
2007	872	+0.96%
2012	1,104	+4.83%
2017	1,371	+4.43%
2023	1,893	+5.52%
Source: INSEE

== Transportation ==
The village is near the airport at Figari.

It has been used as a special stage in the Tour de Corse.

== See also ==
- Communes of the Corse-du-Sud department
