= Figari =

Commune in Corsica, France

- Commune
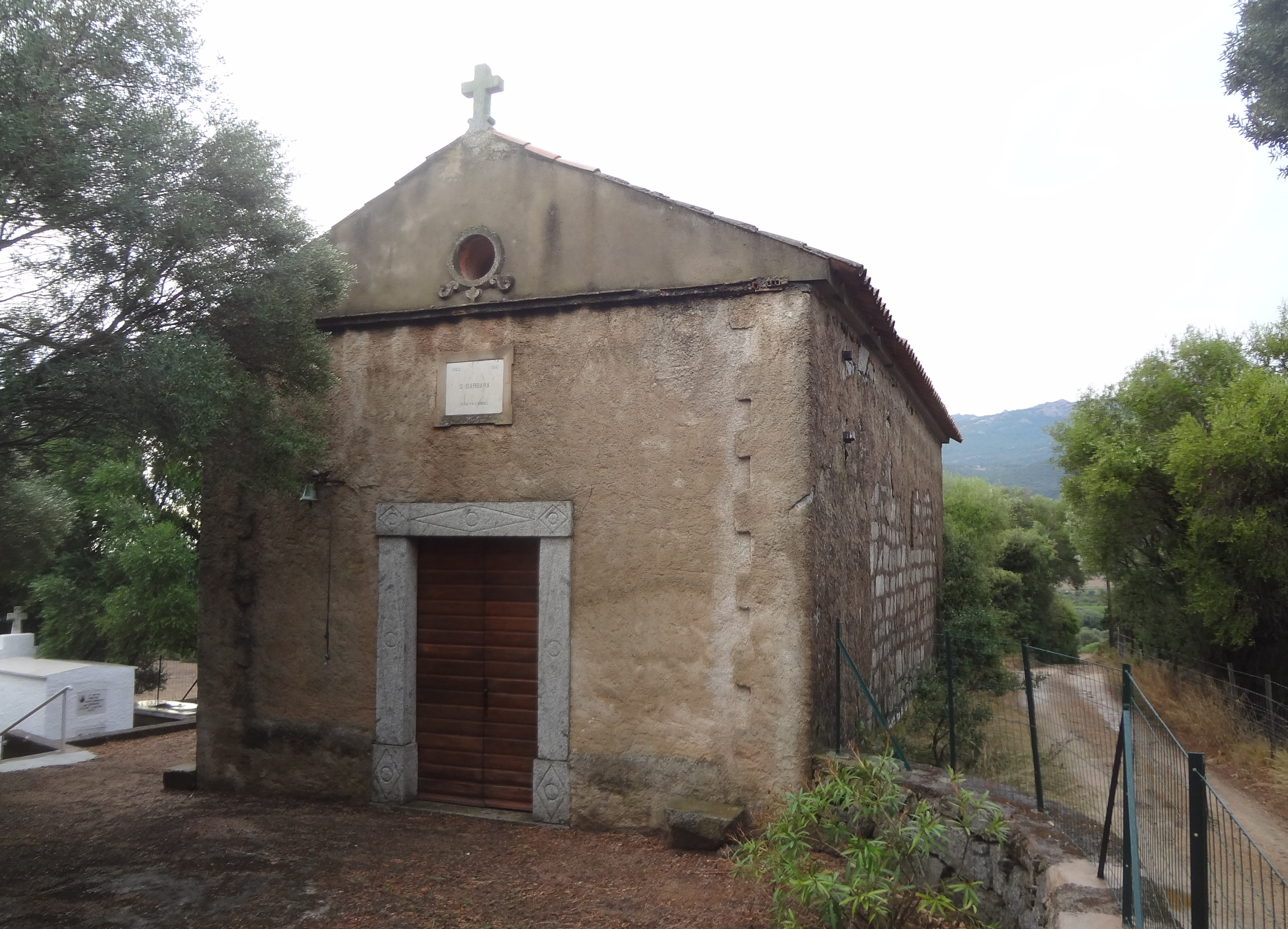
- The chapel of San Giambattista di Pruno (San Ghjambattista di Prunu), in Figari
- Location of Figari
- Location within France Location within Corsica
- Coordinates: 41°29′20″N 9°07′48″E
- Country: France
- Region: Corsica
- Department: Corse-du-Sud
- Arrondissement: Sartène
- Canton: Grand Sud

Government
  - Mayor (2020–2026): Jean Giuseppi
- Area^{1}: 100.22 km^{2} (38.70 sq mi)
- Elevation: 125 m (410 ft)
- Highest elevation: 1,366 m (4,482 ft)
- Lowest elevation: 0 m (0 ft)
- Population (2023): 1,772
  - Density: 17.68/km^{2} (45.79/sq mi)
- Time zone: UTC+01:00 (CET)
  - Summer (DST): UTC+02:00 (CEST)
- INSEE/Postal code: 2A114 /20114
- ^{1} French Land Register data, which excludes lakes, ponds, glaciers > 1 km^{2} (0.386 sq mi or 247 acres) and river estuaries.

Figari (French pronunciation: [fiɡaʁi]; also Corsican: Fìgari) is a commune in the French department of Corse-du-Sud on the island of Corsica, France.

== Geography ==
The village of Figari is 43 kilometers (27 mi) to the southeast of Sartène, 20 km (12 mi) to the southwest of Porto-Vecchio and 19 km (12 mi) to the north of Bonifacio. The commune comes from an ancient parish. It includes the center of a large plain where the airport was built in 1975. To the north looms Mount Cagna, which exceeds 1,100 meters (3,600 ft).

To the southeast hills climb to 320 m (1,050 ft) over the village and enclose the Figari Reservoir, created by damming the Ruisseau de Ventilegne for purposes of water supply and irrigation; additional water can be taken from the Orgone, a small brook which descends from the mountain of Cagna et forms the upper stream of the Stabbiacciu in Porto-Vecchio. To the southwest the commune occupies the east bank of the Bay of Figari, and Ventilegne Point, but not the resort.

=== Climate ===
Figari has a hot-summer mediterranean climate (Köppen climate classification Csa). The average annual temperature in Figari is 16.2 °C (61.2 °F). The average annual rainfall is 643.5 mm (25.33 in) with November as the wettest month. The temperatures are highest on average in August, at around 24.7 °C (76.5 °F), and lowest in February, at around 9.1 °C (48.4 °F). The highest temperature ever recorded in Figari was 43.0 °C (109.4 °F) on 23 July 2009; the coldest temperature ever recorded was −8.0 °C (17.6 °F) on 25 February 1993.

Comparison of local Meteorological data with other cities in France
Town	Sunshine (hours/yr)	Rain (mm/yr)	Snow (days/yr)	Storm (days/yr)	Fog (days/yr)
National average	1,973	770	14	22	40
Figari	2,780.7	572.4	1.4	24.9	6.5
Paris	1,661	637	12	18	10
Nice	2,724	767	1	29	1
Strasbourg	1,693	665	29	29	56
Brest	1,605	1,211	7	12	75

Climate data for Figari (1991–2020 averages, extremes 1979–present)
Month	Jan	Feb	Mar	Apr	May	Jun	Jul	Aug	Sep	Oct	Nov	Dec	Year
Record high °C (°F)	21.2 (70.2)	23.5 (74.3)	30.3 (86.5)	29.7 (85.5)	36.0 (96.8)	37.4 (99.3)	43.0 (109.4)	42.7 (108.9)	36.0 (96.8)	32.5 (90.5)	26.0 (78.8)	22.3 (72.1)	43.0 (109.4)
Mean daily maximum °C (°F)	13.9 (57.0)	14.2 (57.6)	16.3 (61.3)	19.0 (66.2)	23.4 (74.1)	28.0 (82.4)	34.6 (94.3)	31.7 (89.1)	27.1 (80.8)	22.9 (73.2)	18.0 (64.4)	14.9 (58.8)	21.7 (71.1)
Daily mean °C (°F)	9.2 (48.6)	9.1 (48.4)	11.2 (52.2)	13.6 (56.5)	17.5 (63.5)	21.6 (70.9)	24.4 (75.9)	24.7 (76.5)	21.1 (70.0)	17.7 (63.9)	13.5 (56.3)	10.3 (50.5)	16.2 (61.2)
Mean daily minimum °C (°F)	4.5 (40.1)	4.1 (39.4)	6.1 (43.0)	8.2 (46.8)	11.6 (52.9)	15.2 (59.4)	17.6 (63.7)	17.7 (63.9)	15.1 (59.2)	12.6 (54.7)	8.9 (48.0)	5.6 (42.1)	10.6 (51.1)
Record low °C (°F)	−7.4 (18.7)	−8.0 (17.6)	−6.1 (21.0)	−4.6 (23.7)	1.3 (34.3)	4.6 (40.3)	8.0 (46.4)	5.8 (42.4)	4.4 (39.9)	−0.5 (31.1)	−4.7 (23.5)	−7.6 (18.3)	−8.0 (17.6)
Average precipitation mm (inches)	73.2 (2.88)	55.5 (2.19)	57.2 (2.25)	54.4 (2.14)	40.7 (1.60)	21.8 (0.86)	10.1 (0.40)	13.5 (0.53)	54.4 (2.14)	80.4 (3.17)	100.3 (3.95)	82.0 (3.23)	643.5 (25.33)
Average precipitation days (≥ 1.0 mm)	8.0	7.3	6.9	7.2	5.0	2.8	1.2	1.9	5.3	7.4	10.4	9.3	72.7
Average snowy days	0.5	0.5	0.0	0.0	0.0	0.0	0.0	0.0	0.0	0.0	0.0	0.3	1.4
Mean monthly sunshine hours	127.4	142.4	201.7	222.9	295.7	336.1	374.3	339.6	252.2	200.2	135.6	123.5	2,751.6
Source: Meteo France

== Population ==
Historical population
Year	Pop.	±% p.a.
1968	701	—
1975	834	+2.51%
1982	1,022	+2.95%
1990	914	−1.39%
1999	1,005	+1.06%
2007	1,141	+1.60%
2012	1,392	+4.06%
2017	1,446	+0.76%
2023	1,772	+3.45%
Source: INSEE

== Economy ==
Viticulture has been practiced in Figari since the Roman era. There are 153 hectares (380 acres) of vineyards on which Syrah, Grenache, and Vermentino are grown. The wine produced falls under the Vin de Corse-Figari AOC.

== Transportation ==
The airport, Figari Sud-Corse Airport, is the third largest of Corsica. It opened in 1975 with a runway of 2,500 meters (8,200 ft). In 2004 it carried 254,000 passengers, 117,000 between the airport and Paris, 63,000 to or from Marseille, 34,000 to or from Nice, and 37,000 in charters.

== See also ==
- Communes of the Corse-du-Sud department
