= Unione Naziunale =

Corsican group of nationalist political parties

The Unione Naziunale (English: National Union) is a Corsican nationalist group of political parties seeking independence of Corsica from France. In the last regional elections, the movement won around 20% of the votes and formed a group in the Corsican Assembly.

== See also ==
- List of political parties in France
