= Gang de la Brise de Mer =

Corsican crime group

- Founded: 1970s
- Founding location: Corsica, Bastia
- Years active: 1970s-present
- Territory: France (including Corsica, Marseille and Paris), Italy, North Africa, and Argentina
- Ethnicity: People of Corsican descent
- Membership: 300-400 members and associates
- Criminal activities: Racketeering, drug trafficking, skimming, gambling, loan sharking, money laundering, pimping, extortion, robbery, bribery, fraud, management of hotels, night clubs and casinos
- Allies: Hornec family American Mafia; Sicilian Mafia 'Ndrangheta; Clan del Golfo; FLNC
- Rivals: Petit Bar Gang; Venzolasca Gang; Armata Corsa

The Gang de la Brise de Mer is a Corsican criminal organization founded in the 1970s. Based in Northern Corsica, the gang controls various activities (racketeering, slots machines traffic, laundering, night clubs, gambling clubs, casinos, etc.) in Corsica, but also in the South of France, in Paris, in Italy, in Occidental African countries (Gabon, Mali, Cameroon, etc.), and in Latin American countries.

The gang's moniker came from a Bastia cafe called La Brise de Mer ("the sea breeze"), where they held meetings throughout the 1970s.

== Overview ==
The gang is well known for its violent robberies as well as conflicts with rival gangs in Corsica, France and the rest of Europe. These include the robbery of an UBS bank in Geneva in 1990, the deadly shootout with a rival gang member near a Sécuripost truck in 1991, and the 1992 robbery of an Air France Mercure plane.

The "Brise de Mer" is also suspected of involvement in the 2001 murders of members of Armata Corsa, a separatist Corsican armed group.

Approximately ten families or clans constitute the "Brise de Mer" organization. Its capital is estimated to be between 120 and 150 million Euros. This money is invested in Corsica (in illegal activities such as racketeering but also legal activities such as tourism and construction business) and the rest of France, through the running of night clubs, bars and illegal slots machines (principally in cities in southern France such as Marseille, Aix-en-Provence ans Toulon. Other investments include casino activities in Africa, Latin America and Italy.

== Origins ==
The Gang de la Brise de Mer began in the late 1970s, when a group of young Corsican criminals started meeting at a bar in Bastia’s old port called La Brise de Mer, run by Antoine Castelli. In the beginning, their crimes were small and often sloppy - for example during one early robbery, they forgot to bring their weapons. As Corsica grew more unstable, the group became more organized, moving from petty crime to larger operations. Their rise began on September 10, 1981, with the assassination of Louis Memmi, a leading crime figure. It marked the gang's start of their influence over Corsican organized crime.

=== Key members ===
Francis Mariani was a prominent member of the Brise de Mer. Known for his influence and strong personality, he played a key leadership role within the group.

Richard Casanova was a longtime associate of Mariani and played an important role in the Brise de Mer. He was known for making political and international contacts. In the early 2000s, he left the group formed a new faction with Jean-Luc Germani and Jean-Luc Codaccioni.

Casanova’s new group received support from other Corsican clans, including the Mattéi-Rogliano family, who had split from the Brise de Mer after a prison-yard incident in 2000. He also brought in businessman Michel Tomi, the Federici clan known as the “Shepherd Robbers of Venzolasca” and the group from southern Corsica led by Alain Orsoni.

== Corsican organized crime conflict (2000s–2020s) ==
The Corsican organized crime conflict, known as the Grande Guerre du Milieu Corse, is a long-running power struggle. It began in the early 2000s and has continued into the 2020s. Rival criminal factions and their mainland allies are at the center. Each group fights for control over lucrative criminal enterprises across Corsica and beyond.

=== Main factions ===
The violence stems from tensions between two main alliances:

- The Brise de Mer coalition, based in northern Corsica, includes figures such as Francis and Jacques Mariani, Francis Guazzelli and his sons Christophe and Richard, as well as clans led by Pierre-Marie Santucci, Maurice Costa, and Robert Moracchini.
- The southern alliance, centered around the legacy of Jean-Jérôme Colonna (killed in 2006), includes his successors Ange-Marie Michelosi and his son, along with the Petit Bar gang led by Jacques Santoni, which has been dominant in the Ajaccio area in the 2020s.

=== Key events ===
In 2001, several gangsters escaped from a prison near Bastia by sending fake faxes from a judge ordering their release.

The conflict escalated in the mid-2000s. This followed the collapse of the Société Méditerranéenne de Sécurité, founded by former nationalists Antoine Nivaggioni (ex-MPA) and Yves Manunta (ex-ANC). Financial disputes led Manunta to ally with the Petit Bar gang. Both were later assassinated.

The feud intensified after a failed assassination attempt on Francis Mariani in 2005. Retaliation followed quickly. Richard Casanova was killed in 2008. along with Pierre-Marie Santucci and Maurice Costa. Christophe Guazzelli took revenge years later by killing Tony Quilichini ("Tony le Boucher") and Jean-Luc Codaccioni in 2017.

The conflict reached far beyond Corsica. It pulled in criminal networks from Marseille, Aix-en-Provence, and the Paris region. There were also ties abroad, including links to Françafrique. It also involved figures such as Robert Féliciaggi, a businessman with African ties, who was killed in 2006.

Since 2008, several important suspected members of the gang (such as Richard Casanova, Daniel Vittini, Francis Mariani, Pierre-Marie Santucci) have been killed during violent conflicts among the various Corsican gangs.

=== Ongoing violence ===
Law enforcement has disrupted some criminal operations - however, killings and revenge still drive the conflict into the 2020s. The next generation of Corsican crime families is now involved. The conflict also includes networks operating in mainland France and beyond, which is tied to arms deals, drug routes, and global trafficking networks.
