= Monacia-d'Aullène =

Commune in Corsica, France

Monacia-d'Aullène Munacia d'Auddé
- Commune
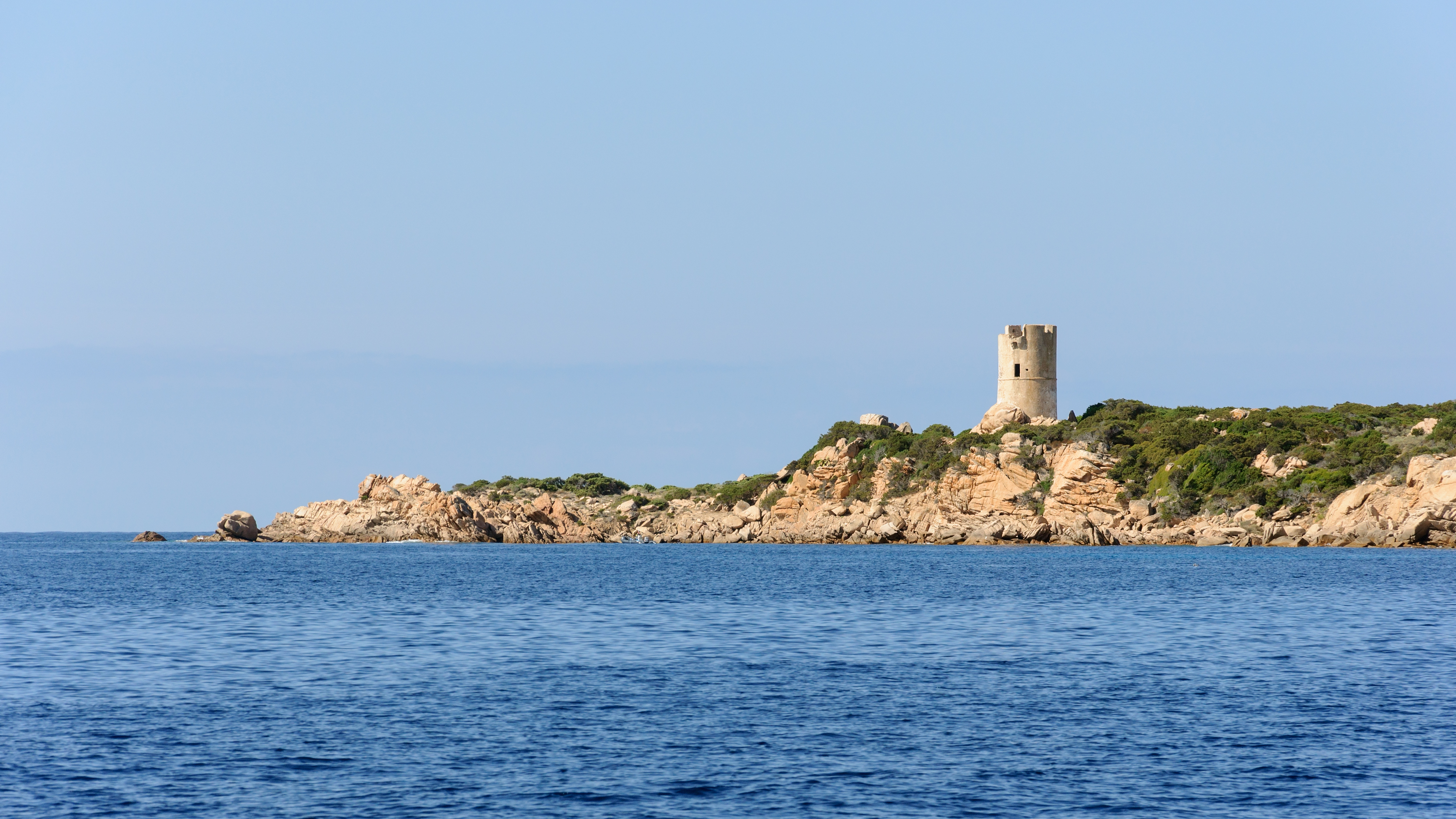
- The Tower of Olmeto, a Genoese tower which is located in the commune
- Location of Monacia-d'Aullène
- Location within France Location within Corsica
- Coordinates: 41°30′49″N 9°00′45″E
- Country: France
- Region: Corsica
- Department: Corse-du-Sud
- Arrondissement: Sartène
- Canton: Grand Sud

Government
  - Mayor (2020–2026): Marc Luciani
- Area^{1}: 40 km^{2} (15 sq mi)
- Elevation: 120 m (390 ft)
- Highest elevation: 1,188 m (3,898 ft)
- Lowest elevation: 0 m (0 ft)
- Population (2023): 540
  - Density: 14/km^{2} (35/sq mi)
- Time zone: UTC+01:00 (CET)
  - Summer (DST): UTC+02:00 (CEST)
- INSEE/Postal code: 2A163 /20171
- ^{1} French Land Register data, which excludes lakes, ponds, glaciers > 1 km^{2} (0.386 sq mi or 247 acres) and river estuaries.

Monacia-d'Aullène (French pronunciation: [mɔnatʃ(j)a dolɛn]; Corsican: Munacia d'Auddé) is a commune in the Corse-du-Sud department of France on the island of Corsica.

It is part of the canton of Grand Sud.

== Geography ==
Monacia-d'Aullène is 14 kilometres (9 mi) west northwest of Figari. It was created in 1864 by dividing Aullène. To the north is the 1,292-metre (4,239 ft) high Mount Cagna, known for its balanced granite boulders named the "Man of Cagna", where the isolated hamlet of Giannucio is located. To the southwest, the commune has an opening to the coast between Point Roccapino to the northwest and the Cala di Furnellu. The latter is preceded by Caniscione Point, on which is the Genoese Tower of Olmeto.

== Population ==
Historical population
Year	Pop.	±% p.a.
1968	325	—
1975	353	+1.19%
1982	421	+2.55%
1990	412	−0.27%
1999	396	−0.44%
2007	485	+2.57%
2012	467	−0.75%
2017	528	+2.49%
2023	540	+0.38%
Source: INSEE

== See also ==
- Communes of the Corse-du-Sud department
