= Corsican mafia =

Criminal groups from Corsica

- Founded: c. 1910s
- Founding location: Corsica
- Years active: c. 1910s–present
- Territory: France, Belgium, North Africa and Latin America
- Ethnicity: Corsican
- Membership: 3.000-4.000 members and associates
- Activities: Racketeering, weapons trafficking, gambling, drug trafficking, assault, theft, smuggling, infiltration of politics, murder, tax evasion
- Allies: American Mafia
- Notable members: List of members

The Corsican mafia (Corsican: Mafia corsa) or Corsican organized crime is a collective of criminal groups originating from Corsica. The Corsican mafia is an influential organized crime structure operating in France, as well as North African and Latin American countries.

== History ==
=== The Union Corse and the French Connection era ===
The pre-war crime bosses of Marseille, Paul Carbone and François Spirito, collaborated closely with the Milice in Vichy France and the Nazi Gestapo in Occupied France. In World War II, the Corsican mafia led by the Guerini brothers (Antoine and Barthélémy, nicknamed "Mémé") sided with the anti-communist SFIO faction within the French Resistance.

In 1947, Marseille was the main trading port of the French colonial empire and it had a Communist mayor, Jean Christofol, who was backed by the labour unions for longshoremen, transportation workers, and dockworkers. In the coming Cold War, both the center-left French government and the US fought against Soviet influence in Marseille, while covertly employing illegal means to further that goal: the Guerini gang was employed to disrupt union and electoral gatherings, back strikebreakers and support US-funded anti-Soviet labor unions.

From the 1950s to the 1960s, the Guerini brother were exempt from prosecution in Marseille. The Guerini brothers smuggled opiates from French Indochina using the Messageries Maritimes, a French merchant shipping company.

During the 1950s the American mafia and the Corsican mafia partnered in drug trafficking in Cuba. Paul Mondoloni and Floridian mafia boss Santo Trafficante Jr. are reported to have moved between 50 and 150kg of heroin every three to six months from Cuba to the United States. Cuban dictator Fulgencio Batista was paid off $20,000 per week to facilitate this. Later Mondoloni moved into Mexico. Author Douglas Valentine describes Mondoloni as "the grand architect of Corsican drug trafficking in Mexico". In February 1970 he met with American mobster Meyer Lansky to discuss opening up new routes.

From the 1960s to the early 1970s the major Corsican organized crime groups were collectively termed the Unione Corse by American law enforcement. During the same era, they organized the French Connection, a massive heroin trafficking operation based in Marseille that sold to the American Mafia.

=== The Corsican mafia today ===
The end of the French Connection caused the disbandment of Corsican clans involved in the heroin trade. However, the evolution of the Corsican mafia has continued its several illegal activities (hold-ups, racketeering, casinos, illegal slot machines, various drug dealing and prostitution). From the 1980s, the Corsican mafia, which operated mainly outside Corsica, refocused partly on its native island. From then on, it continued to increase its influence. It was in these years in particular that the Brise de Mer gang was born, which would subsequently become one of the largest criminal groups in Corsica and France.

Since the end of the 2000s, violent internal conflicts troubled the Corsican mafia, resulting in around 102 murders on the island of Corsica.

Today, the Corsican mafia consists of multiple families, allies, and rivals. Known groups in the Corsican mafia are the Venzolasca Gang (nickname in reference to the village of Venzolasca, in northern Corsica, which are from key members of the gang), considered the Brise de Mer successors. The Petit Bar Gang of Ajaccio and the Corsican mob of Marseille are also active.

Corsica has a tradition of banditry and criminality similar to the Italian Mezzogiorno, with a multitude of criminal groups made up of a few members to a few dozen members. 25 are awarded according to a 2022 report, 20 in a new report in 2025. Their links with political and economic circles are important, as is their hold on the territory with the racket.

Violence is frequent, Corsica is the region of Europe with the highest homicide rate per inhabitant. The mafia chief François Chiappe, who inspired The French Connection, died in Argentina at the age of 88 due to senile dementia in 2009.

On February 26, 2025, the president of the Corsican island region Gilles Simeoni, presented 30 measures to combat Corsican organized crime before the Corsican Regional Assembly.

A 2025 report by the French judicial police intelligence unit SIRASCO, reported by Le Monde, described Corsican organized crime as undergoing a “major recomposition,” with approximately twenty groups exercising mafia-style control. The report highlighted their infiltration into economic sectors such as construction, hospitality and real estate, and noted the emergence of two principal blocs: one linked to the Petit Bar Gang in Ajaccio and another associated with the Mattei clan, which has sought to unify various groups. The report also emphasized the instability of this balance and the ongoing risk of violent conflict.

== Notable groups ==
- Unione Corse (1930s-1970s)
- Gang de la Brise de Mer (1970–present)
- Petit Bar Gang (2000s-present)

According to official reports, there is about 20 different groups across Corsica in 2025.

== Notable Corsican gangsters ==
- Paul Carbone
- Marcel Francisci
- François Marcantoni
- Paul Mondoloni
- Auguste Ricord
- Lucien Sarti
- François Spirito

== In popular culture ==
- The French film A Prophet (2009) shows the gradual rise of a young prisoner, cornered by the leader of the Corsican gang who rules the prison.
- The French television series Mafiosa references a Corsican gang led by a woman.
- In the film American Gangster, the Corsican mafia attempt to murder Frank Lucas after he puts them out of business through his monopoly on the heroin trade.
- Mireille Bouquet, the main protagonist of the 2001 anime series Noir, is a surviving member of a family once involved with the Corsican mafia.
- An extensive French study called "Les Parrains Corses" by J. Follorou and V. Nouzille explains the history of the Corsican mafia.
- Ian Fleming's James Bond novel On Her Majesty's Secret Service is set against a background of Union Corse activities.
- In the Japanese manga and anime Banana Fish by Akimi Yoshida, a fictionalized version of the Corsican mafia is heavily featured as the villain. In modern times (1980s for the manga and 2010s for the anime) it is run by an international Corsican Foundation and funded by prostitution, money laundering, tax evasion, government corruption, and the focus of the show is on their drug experimentation.
