= Armata Corsa =

Extremist organization

- Leaders: François Santoni; Jean-Michel Rossi
- Founded: 1999
- Dissolved: 2001; 25 years ago
- Active regions: Corsica
- Size: Approximately 30

Armata Corsa (literally "Corsican Army") was an underground separatist terrorist organization in Corsica, founded in 1999 and disbanded around 2001.

== History ==
Armata Corsa was founded in 1999. Its suspected leaders, François Santoni and Jean-Michel Rossi, allegedly resigned from another organization National Liberation Front of Corsica (FLNC) the previous year to form their own group.

The organization claims that it acts against links between nationalistic and criminal organizations in Corsica. It denounces mafia-style activities of groups like FLNC and regards itself as the only one serving a pure nationalist cause. Its stated goals include destruction of Corsican organized crime and the nationalist groups involved with it; transfer of Corsican terrorists currently incarcerated in French prisons to Corsica; and Corsican independence.

The first acts of terrorism the group claimed responsibility for were five bomb attacks against Departmental Amenities Directorate (DDE) buildings in Ajaccio, Calvi, Corte, Porto-Vecchio and Sartène. Two days later police also found an unexploded bomb in Bastia. Two months later there was an explosion in Bonifacio that destroyed a hotel owned by Italians.

Corsica is the main area of AC activities although they have claimed responsibility for some explosions in mainland France as well. They target public infrastructure, banks, tourists, police and army buildings and targets they regards as symbols of French power over Corsica.

The assumed size of the organization was about 30 people.

In August 2000, Jean-Michel Rossi and his bodyguard were killed in the Corsican town of L'Île-Rousse; AC claimed that rival nationalists were responsible. They threatened to attack targets in continental France if the police would not swiftly produce results, but the threat has not been carried out.

François Santoni has repeatedly denounced violence. In 2001, he was sentenced to four years in prison for extortion.
