= Megachile pyrenaea =

Scientific classification
- Domain: Eukaryota
- Kingdom: Animalia
- Phylum: Arthropoda
- Class: Insecta
- Order: Hymenoptera
- Family: Megachilidae
- Genus: Megachile
- Species: M. pyrenaea

Binomial name
- Megachile pyrenaea Pérez, 1890

Species of leafcutter bee (Megachile)

Megachile pyrenaea is a species of bee in the family Megachilidae. It was described by Jean Pérez in 1890.
