= Jean Pérez =

Jean Pérez could refer to:

- Jean Pérez (entomologist) (1833–1914), French entomologist
- Jean Piero Pérez (born 1981), Venezuelan boxer
