= Megachile lucidifrons =

Scientific classification
- Domain: Eukaryota
- Kingdom: Animalia
- Phylum: Arthropoda
- Class: Insecta
- Order: Hymenoptera
- Family: Megachilidae
- Genus: Megachile
- Species: M. lucidifrons

Binomial name
- Megachile lucidifrons Ferton, 1905

Species of leafcutter bee (Megachile)

Megachile lucidifrons is a species of bee in the family Megachilidae. It was described by Ferton in 1905.
