= King of Aragon's Staircase =

Cliff face staircase in Corsica, France

Coordinates: 41.3863°N 9.1561°E

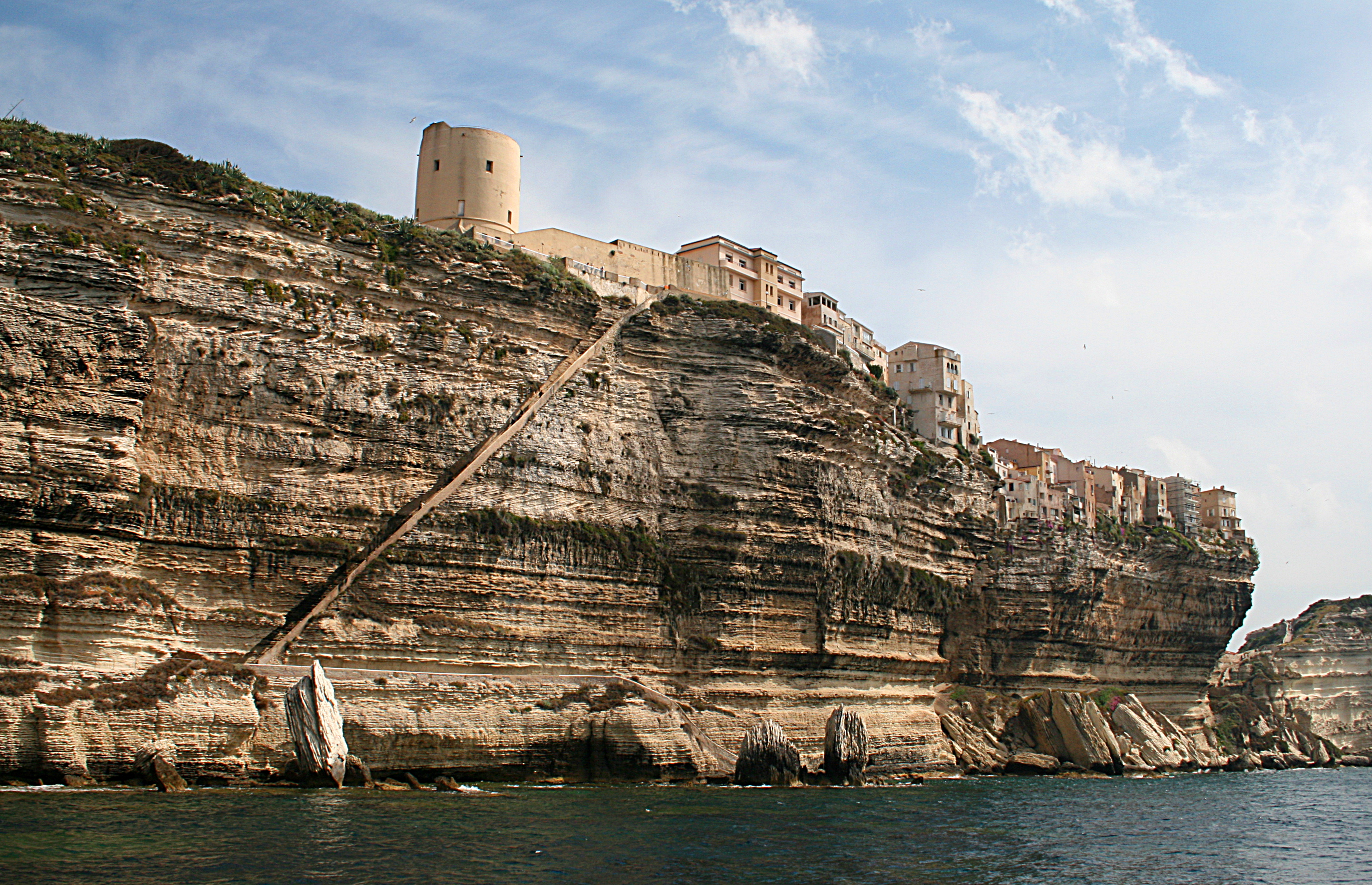

The King of Aragon's Staircase (French: Escalier du roi d'Aragon; Corsican: Scali di u rè d'Aragona) is a staircase carved into the limestone cliff off Bonifacio on the French island of Corsica. There are 189 steps and the staircase is at a 45-degree incline. The staircase was registered as a Monument historique in 1994 and 2023.

Its name comes from a legend that it was ordered to be built by King Alfonso V of Aragon during his invasion of Corsica in 1420, ostensibly in a single night. It was actually built by Franciscan monks in order to reach drinking water from a well at the bottom.

In 1909, Charles Ferton examined the hypotheses for the construction of the staircase. The Alfonso legend was discarded due to the sheer impossibility of building the staircase in one night, as well as the presence of Genoese guard towers nearby. The 12-metre gap between the last step and the sea also discounts this hypothesis, as well as another one putting forward that it was built for evacuation. There is a lack of written or oral record of these two hypotheses.

Children under 12 who descend and ascend the staircase receive a certificate.
