= Charles Ferton =

French artillery officer and entomologist

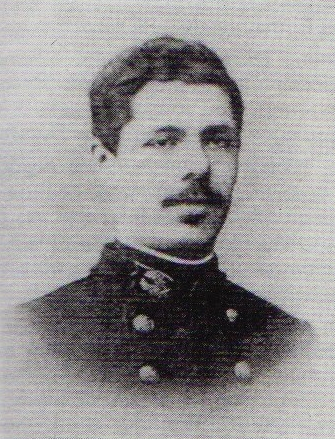

Louis Antoine François Charles Ferton (17 January 1856 – 30 April 1921) was a French artillery officer and entomologist who studied the behaviour of hymenoptera and contributed to ideas on insect instinct.

== Life and work ==
Ferton was born in Chierry, son of a namesake nurseryman and a founding member of the Château-Thierry agricultural and horticultural society who was married to Louise Victoire Appoline Bujot. Ferton was educated at the Louis-le-Grand high school and graduated from the École polytechnique in 1875. He graduated from Fontainebleau in 1877 and joined the army and was posted in Avignon (1882–1886), Châtellerault (1886), Bourges (1887), Vincennes (1888), Algiers (1889–1890), Angers (1891), Marseille (1892–1894) and finally Bonifacio (1895–1921). It was in Avignon that he learned of the work of Jean-Henri Fabre (1823–1915) and got interested in entomology. He was posted in Algeria where he began to study the hymenoptera. In 1895 he moved to Bonifacio as commandant and lived there until his death, even refusing promotions. He was made Knight of the Legion of Honor in 1817. He examined the stinging behaviour of Sphex subfuscatus and identified errors in Fabre's observations. He examined nest site recognition and orientation of leaf-cutter bees. He was a great friend of the entomologist Jean Pérez (1833–1914) after whom he named Osmia perezi (now Hoplitis perezi) in 1895. Like Fabre he used anthropomorphic descriptions. He became a member of the Entomological Society of France in 1890. In 1910 he received the Jean Dollfus Prize. He also took an interest in geology and prehistory, making studies in Corsica.

Ferton was a very thin man and he was nicknamed Mangia grilli ("eats crickets"). He was known to go on walks and destroy traps set for birds with his cane.His funeral was held at the Sainte Marie Majeure church before burial in the Saint François cemetery. His collections of insects from Bonifacio are held in the MHN in Paris.

A street in Chierry is named after Ferton. Halictes fertoni described by Joseph Vachal in 1895 from a specimen collected from Algeria is now a synonym of Lasioglossum discum (Smith 1853).

== Publications ==
Ferton published mainly in the journal of the Entomological Society of France and to some extent in the proceedings of the Linnean Society. His publications include:

- 1890. Un Hyménoptère ravisseur de Fourmis. (Actes Soc. Linn. Bordeaux, XLIV).
- 1891. Notes pour servir à l'histoire des Pompilides. (Actes Soc. Linn. Bordeaux, XLIV)
- 1891. Recherches sur les mœurs de quelques espèces algériennes d’Hyménoptères du genre Osmia. (Actes Soc. Linn. Bordeaux, XLIV).
- 1893. Sur les mœurs de quelques Hyménoptères de la Provence du genre Osmia. (Actes Soc. Linn. Bordeaux, XLV).
- 1895. Sur les mœurs du Dolichurus haemorrhous Costa. (Actes Soc Linn. Bordeaux. XLVII).
- 1895. Seconde note sur les mœurs de quelques Hyménoptères du genre Osmia, principalement de la Provence. (Actes Soc. Linn. Bordeaux. XLVII).
- 1896. Nouvelles observations sur l’instinct des Hyménoptères Gastrilégides de la Provence. (Actes Soc. Linn. Bordeaux, XLVIII).
- 1896. Nouveaux Hyménoptères fouisseurs et observations sur l'instinct de quelques espèces. (Actes Soc. Linn. Bordeaux, XLVIII).
- 1896. Observations sur l'instinct de quelques Hyménoptères du genre Odynerus. (Actes Soc. Linn. Bordeaux, XLVIII).
- 1897. Nouvelles observations sur l'instinct des Pompilides. (Actes Soc. Linn. Bordeaux. LII).
- 1897. Nouvelles observations sur l’instinct des Hyménoptères Gastrilégides de France et de Corse. (Actes Soc. Linn Bordeaux, LII).
- 1897. Remarques sur les mœurs de quelques espèces de Prosopix. (Bull. Soc. entom. Fr., [1897]. p. 58).
- 1898. Sur les mœurs du Sphecodes Latr. et des Halictus Latr. Bull. Soc. entom. Fr.. [1898], p. 75).
- 1899. Observations sur l'instinct des Bembex. Actes Soc. Linn. Bordeaux, LIV).
- 1901. Description de l'Osmia Corsica, n. sp. et observations sur la faune corse. Bull. Soc. entom. Fr. p. 61.
- 1901. Les Hyménoptères de Corse (Apiaires. Sphégides. Pompilides et Vespides. Sur les mœurs du Stizus fasciatus F. C. R de l'A. F. A. S. Congrès d'Ajaccio. 1901).
- 1912. Hyménoptères nouveaux d'Algérie et observations sur l’instinct d'une espèce. (Bull. Soc. ent. Fr., p. 186).
- 1914. Perezia maura, nouveau genre d’Apiaires parasites d'Algérie et observations de ce genre. (Ann. Soc. entom. Fr.. LXXXIII. p. 333).
- 1916. J.H. Fabre - entomologiste, Revue scientifique. n° 18. pp. 545-557.
- 1901–1921. Notes détachées sur l’instinct des Hyménoptères mellifères et ravisseurs. Ann. Soc. Entom. — 1 série. LXX [1901] pp. 83-148. pl. 1–3). — 2e série. LXXI [1902] (pp. 499-531. pl. IV). — 3e série, LXXIV [1905] (pp. 56-104, pl. 3–4). — 4e série, LXXVII [1908]. pp. 535-586 pl. 14) — 5e série. LXXVIII [1909] (pp. 401-422). — 6e série. LXXIX [1910] (pp. 145-178). — 7e série. LXXX (1911] (pp. 351-412). - 8e série, LXXXIII [1914] (pp. 81-119. pl. Ill-V). — 9e série, LXXXIX [1920] 1921 (pp. 329-375).
