= Ceccia =

Archaeological site in Corsica

Coordinates: 41°33′40″N 9°14′53″E

Ceccia is an archaeological site in Corsica. It is located in the commune of Porto-Vecchio and has been dated to 1350 BC.
