= Tivulaghju =

Archaeological site in Haute-Corse, France

- Interactive map of Tivulaghju
- 41°34′18″N 9°15′21″E
- Location: Corsica, France

Tivulaghju is an archaeological site in Corsica. It is located in the commune of Porto-Vecchio. The site was first excavated in 1960, and has since been used to prove prehistoric links between Corsica and Sardinia.
