= Casteddu di Tappa =

Archaeological site in Corsica, France

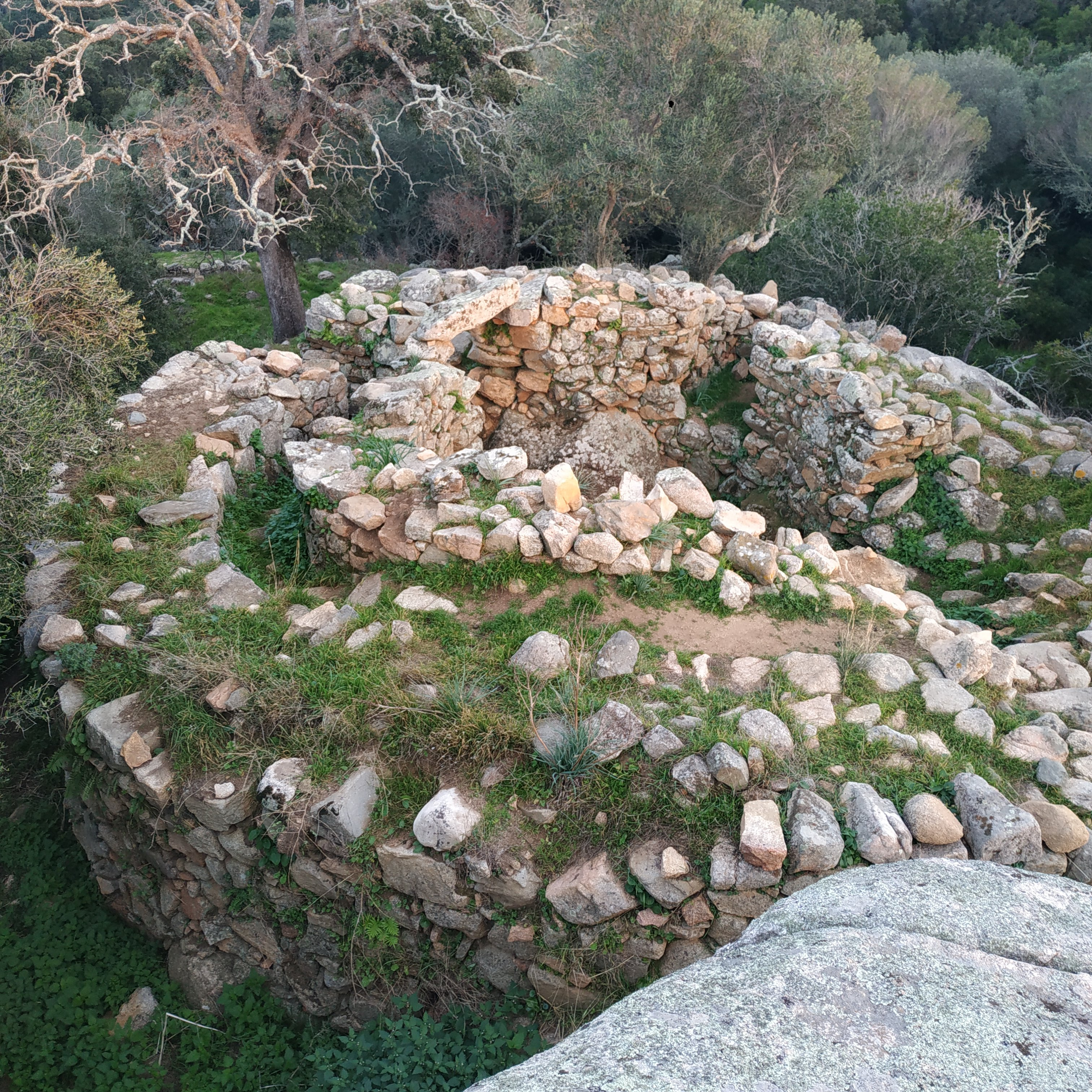
- The site in 2020
- Interactive map of Casteddu di Tappa
- 41°33′8″N 9°13′50″E
- Type: Settlement
- Location: Porto-Vecchio, Corsica, France

History
- Built: c. 2200 BC
- Abandoned: c. 1900 BC

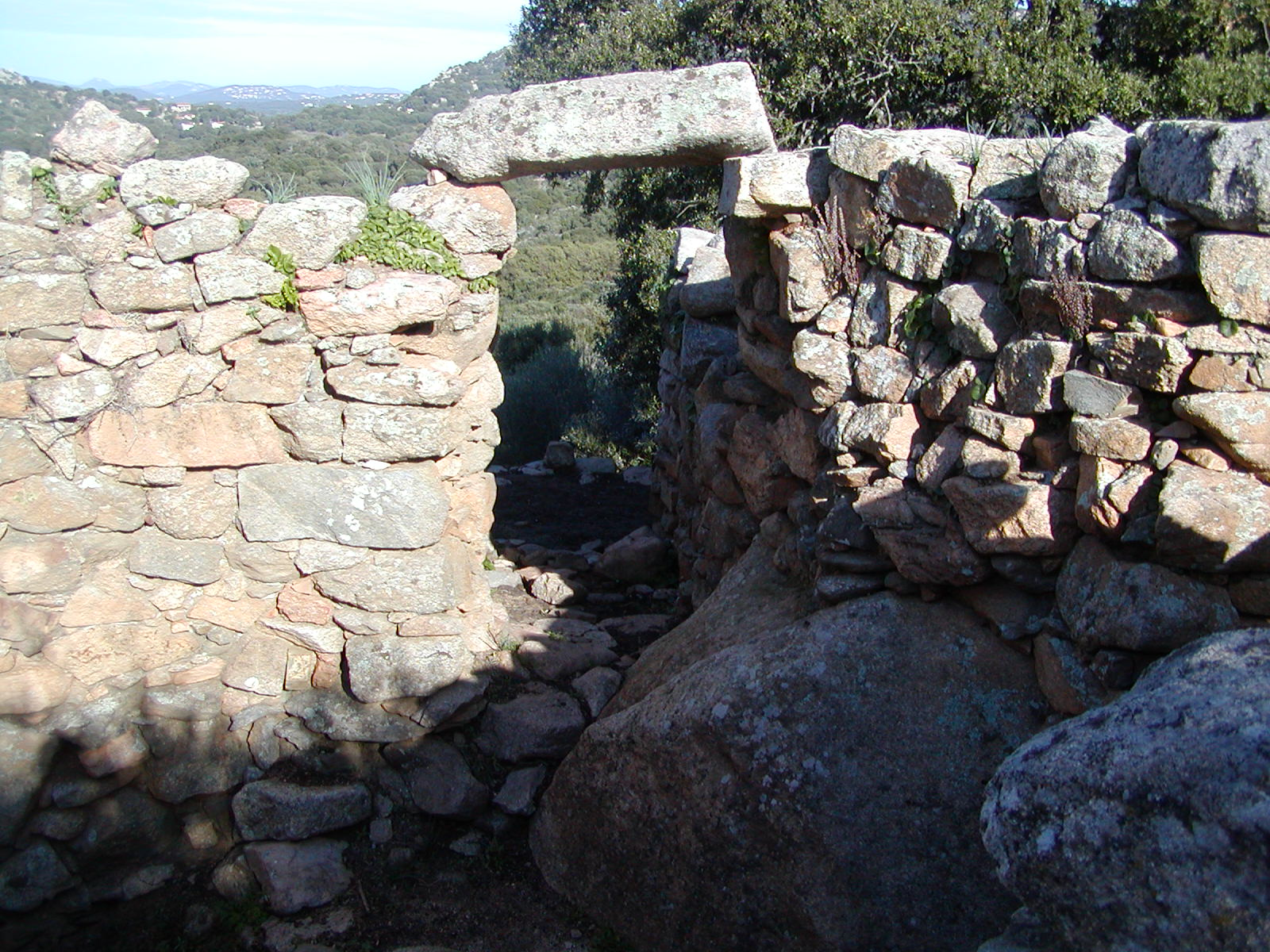
Entry of the main structure

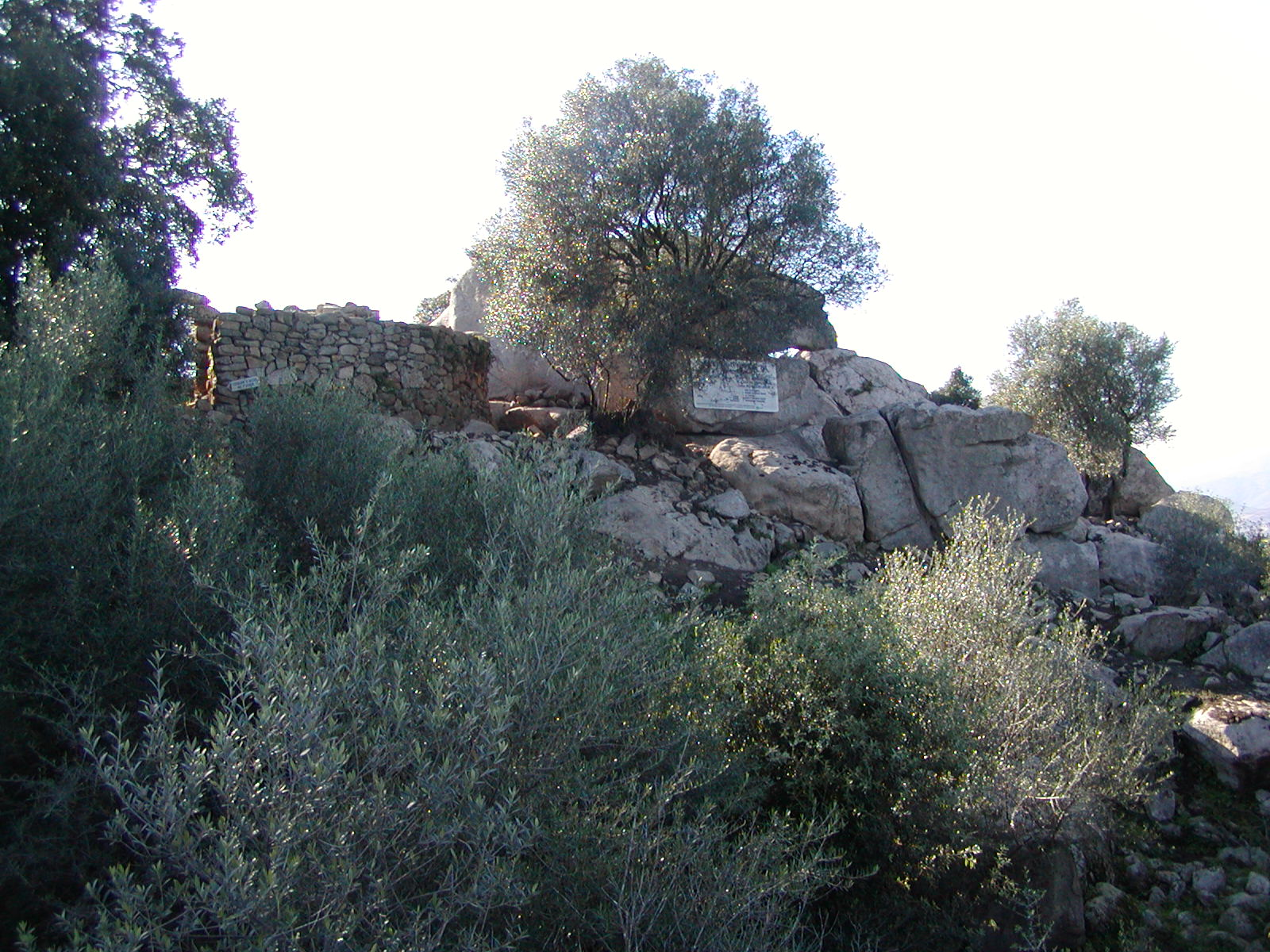

Casteddu di Tappa is a Bronze Age archaeological site of the Torreann Culture in Corsica. It is located in the commune of Porto-Vecchio.

== See also ==
- Prehistory of Corsica
