= Église Saint-Dominique de Bonifacio =

Church in Bonifacio, France

Coordinates: 41°23′13″N 9°9′20″E

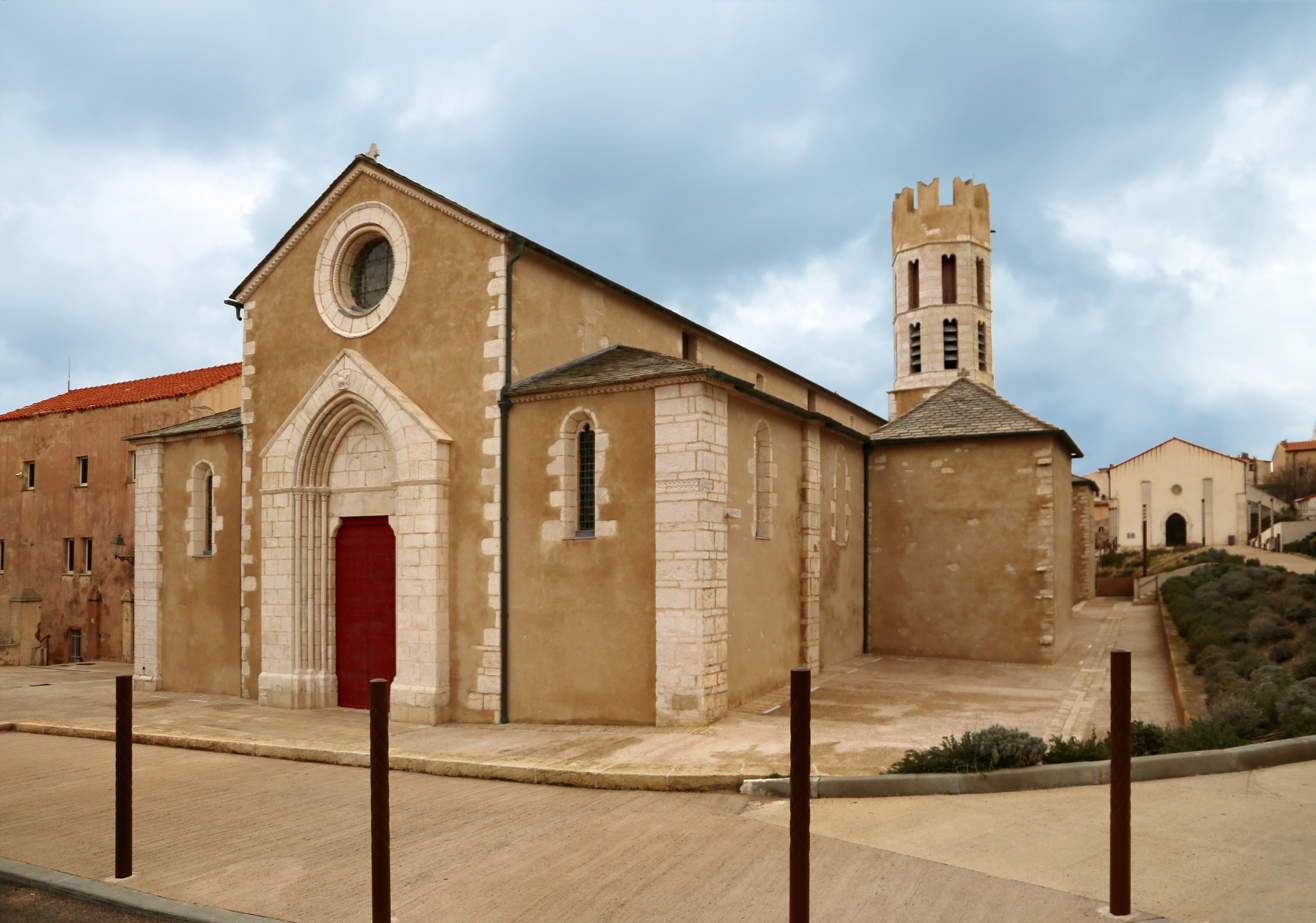
Église Saint-Dominique de Bonifacio

Église Saint-Dominique de Bonifacio is a church in Bonifacio, Corse-du-Sud, southeastern Corsica. It is the largest church on the island.

The church is located within the walls of an old Dominican convent, now defunct, in the western part of the historic center, next to City Hall of Bonifacio. The church was built from the late thirteenth century. The building was classified as a Historic Monument in 1862.

== Description ==
The church has elements of the Gothic architectural style, although the simplicity of its exterior architecture is reminiscent of the Romanesque. The presence of elements of Gothic style is particularly rare in Corsica. Its bell tower has a unique structure: a square base, then it becomes octagonal and is crowned by battlements. The plan consists of a nave with six bays and two square chapels on the sides.
