= Bonifacio, Corse-du-Sud =

Commune in Corsica, France

Bonifacio Bunifaziu (Corsican) Bunifazziu (Ligurian)
- Commune
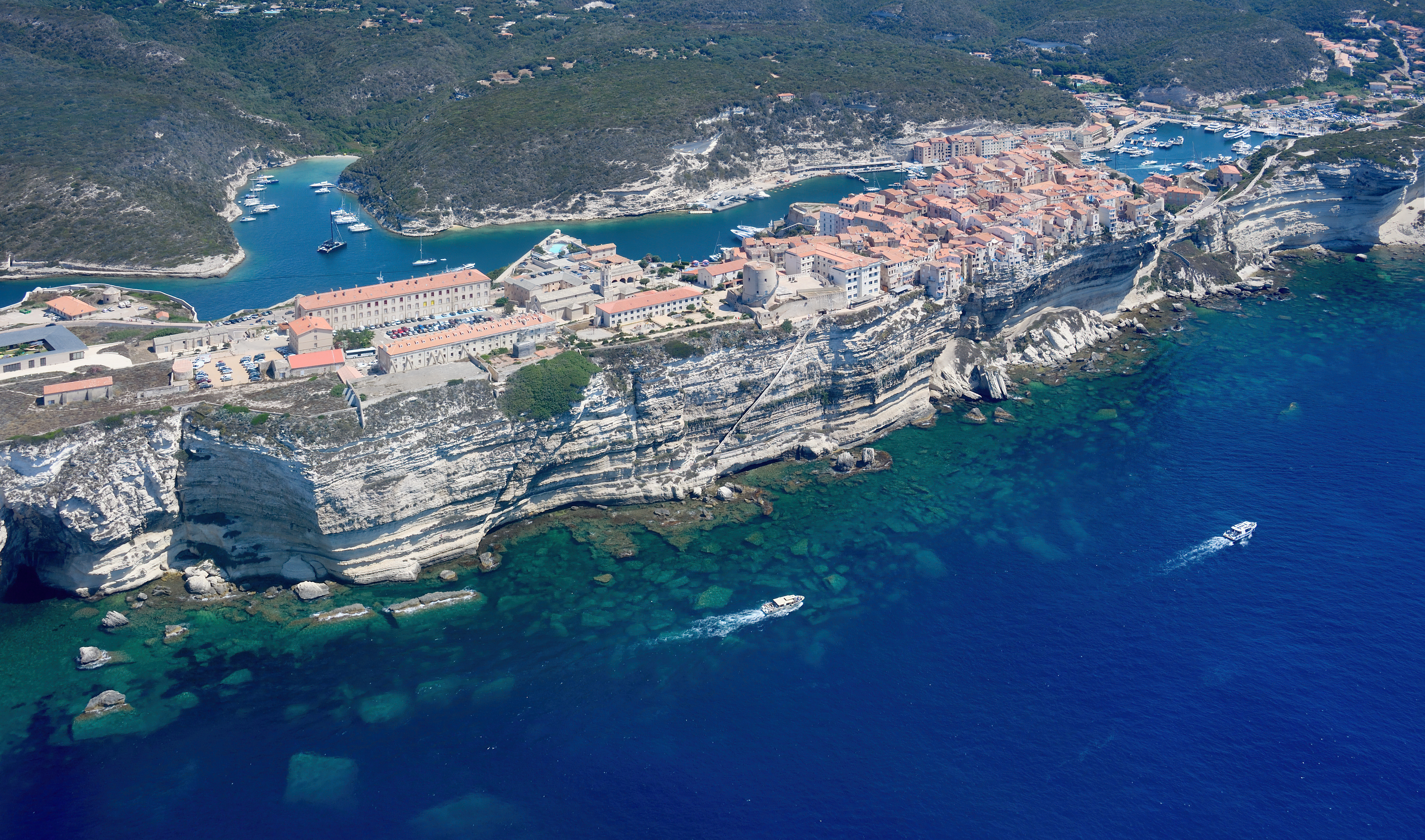
- Aerial view of Bonifacio

- Flag Coat of arms
- Motto: Libertas
- Location of Bonifacio
- Location within France Location within Corsica
- Coordinates: 41°23′13″N 9°09′25″E
- Country: France
- Region: Corsica
- Department: Corse-du-Sud
- Arrondissement: Sartène
- Canton: Grand Sud

Government
  - Mayor (2020–2026): Jean-Charles Orsucci
- Area^{1}: 138.36 km^{2} (53.42 sq mi)
- Highest elevation: 70 m (230 ft)
- Lowest elevation: 0 m (0 ft)
- Population (2023): 3,344
  - Density: 24.17/km^{2} (62.60/sq mi)
- Time zone: UTC+01:00 (CET)
  - Summer (DST): UTC+02:00 (CEST)
- INSEE/Postal code: 2A041 /20169
- ^{1} French Land Register data, which excludes lakes, ponds, glaciers > 1 km^{2} (0.386 sq mi or 247 acres) and river estuaries.

Bonifacio (/ˌboʊniˈfɑːtʃoʊ/ BOH-nee-FAH-choh, Italian: [boniˈfaːtʃo], French: [bɔnifasjo]; Corsican: Bunifaziu [buniˈfatsju], Bonifaziu [bɔniˈfatsju], or Bonifaciu [bɔniˈfatʃu]; Bonifacino: Bunifazziu; Gallurese: Bunifaciu) is a commune in the southern tip of the island of Corsica, in the French department of Corse-du-Sud.

Bonifacio is the setting of Guy de Maupassant's short story "A Vendetta".

== Geography ==
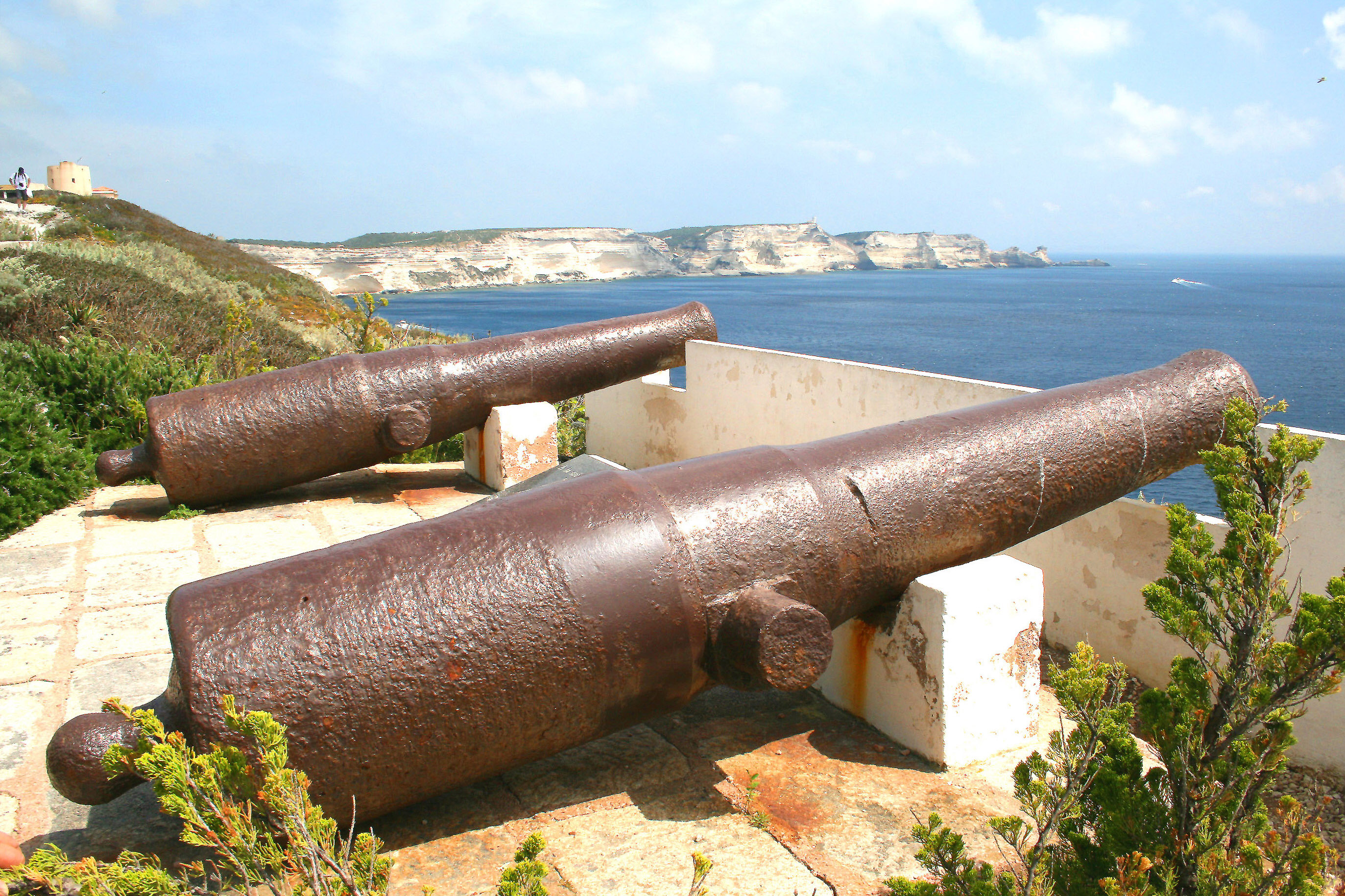
Guns in the fortress of Bonifacio.

Bonifacio is located directly on the Mediterranean Sea, separated from Sardinia by the Strait of Bonifacio. It is a city placed on the best and only major harbour of the southern coast and also is a commune covering a somewhat larger region including the offshore Isles Lavezzi, giving it the distinction of being the southernmost commune in Metropolitan France. It lies closer to the capital cities of 20 other countries in Europe and Africa than its own, Paris. The commune is bordered on the northwest by the canton of Figari and has a short border on the northeast with the canton of Porto-Vecchio. The combined border runs approximately from the Golfe de Ventilegne on the west to the mouth of the Golfu di Sant'Amanza on the east. The coastline circumscribed by the two points is about 75 kilometres (47 mi). Highway N198 runs north along the east coast and N196 along the west.

The islands are part of the French portion, 794.6-square-kilometre (196,300-acre), of the international Bouches de Bonifacio ("Strait of Bonifacio") marine park, a nature reserve, signed into legal existence by France and Italy in 1993 for the protection of the strait against passage of ships bearing dangerous chemicals, and implemented in France by a ministerial decree of 1999 detailing the land to be included in the réserve naturelle de Bouches de Bonifacio for the preservation of wild birds, other fauna and flora, fish and nature in general.

The southern coast in the vicinity of Bonifacio is an outcrop of chalk-white limestone, precipitous and sculpted into unusual shapes by the ocean. Slightly further inland the limestone adjoins the granite of which the two islands, Sardinia and Corsica, are formed. The port of Bonifacio is placed on the Bay of Bonifacio, a drowned ravine of a fjord-like appearance separated from the ocean by a finger-like promontory 1,500 meters (4,900 ft) long and 200 meters (660 ft) wide. In prehistoric post-glacial times when sea levels were low and the islands were connected, the ravine was part of a valley leading to upland Corsica. The maximum draught supported by the harbour is 3.5 meters (11 ft), more than ample for ancient ships and modern small vessels.

The city of Bonifacio is split into two sections. The vieille ville (old town), or la Haute Ville (the Upper city), on the site of a citadel, is located on the promontory overlooking the Mediterranean Sea. The citadel was built in the 9th century with the foundation of the city. The Citadel has been reconstructed and renovated many times since its construction and most recently was an administrative center for the French Foreign Legion. Today it is more of a museum. Historically most of the inhabitants have resided in the Haute ville under the immediate protection of the citadel. The harbour facilities and residential areas below, la marine, line the narrow shelf of the inlet and extend for some distance up the valley, giving the settlement a linear appearance and creating a third residential section limited by St. Julien on the east.

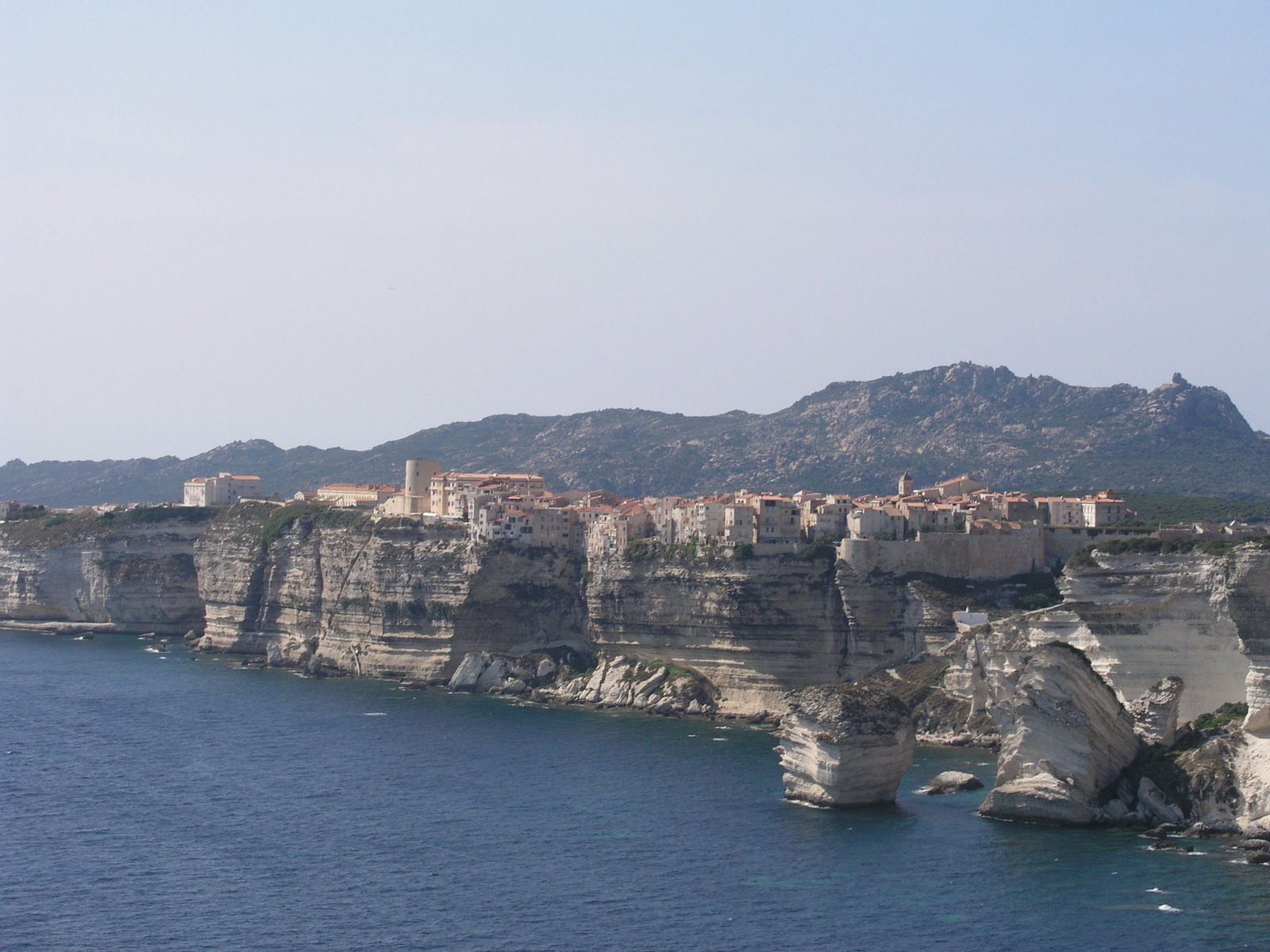

The city and its fortifications also extend for some distance along the cliff-tops, which are at about 70 meters (230 ft) elevation. The cliffs have been undercut by the ocean so that the buildings, which have been placed on the very lip of the precipice, appear to overhang it. The appearance from the sea is of a white city gleaming in the sun and suspended over the rough waters below.

== History ==
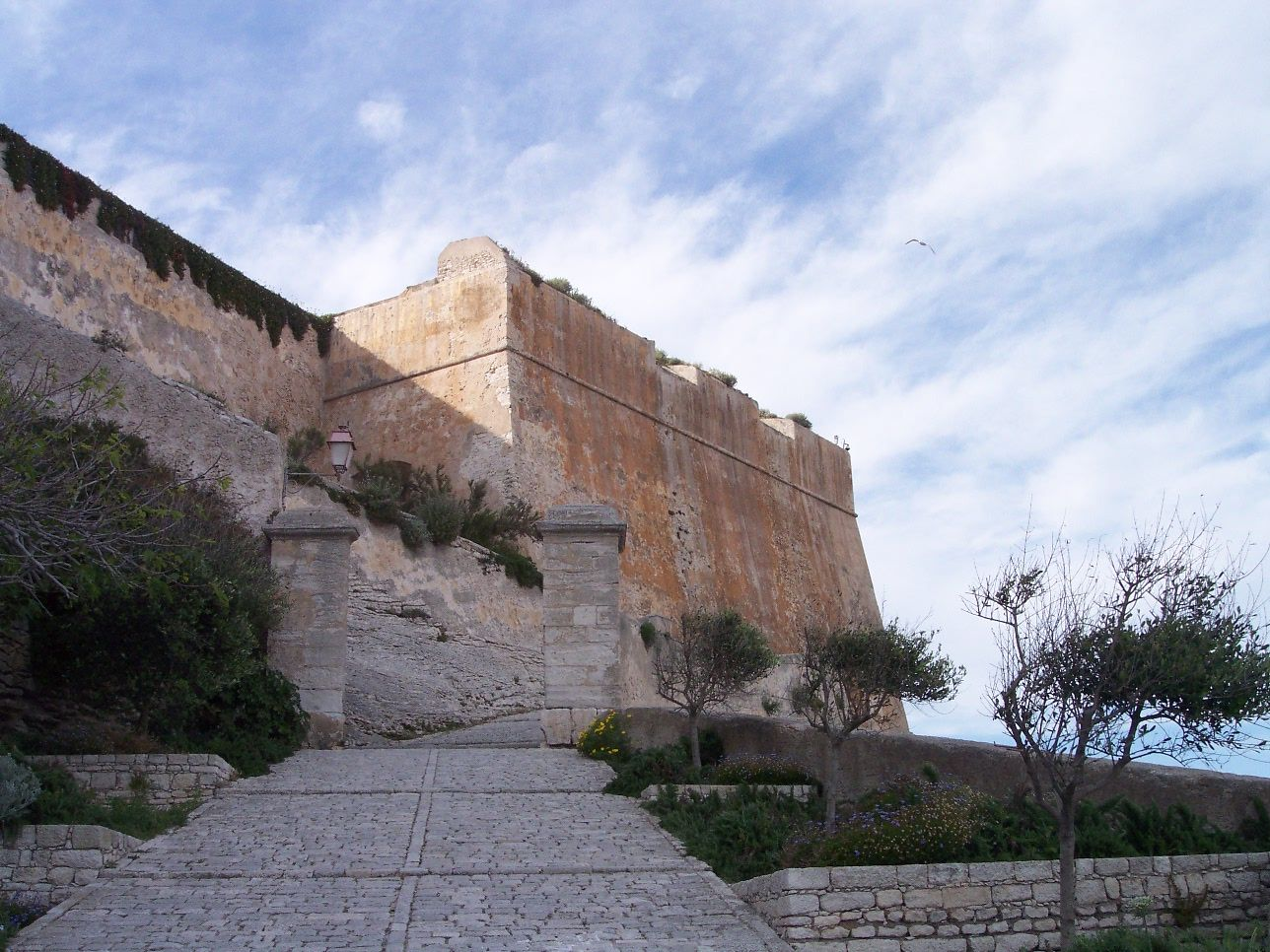
The citadel at Bonifacio.

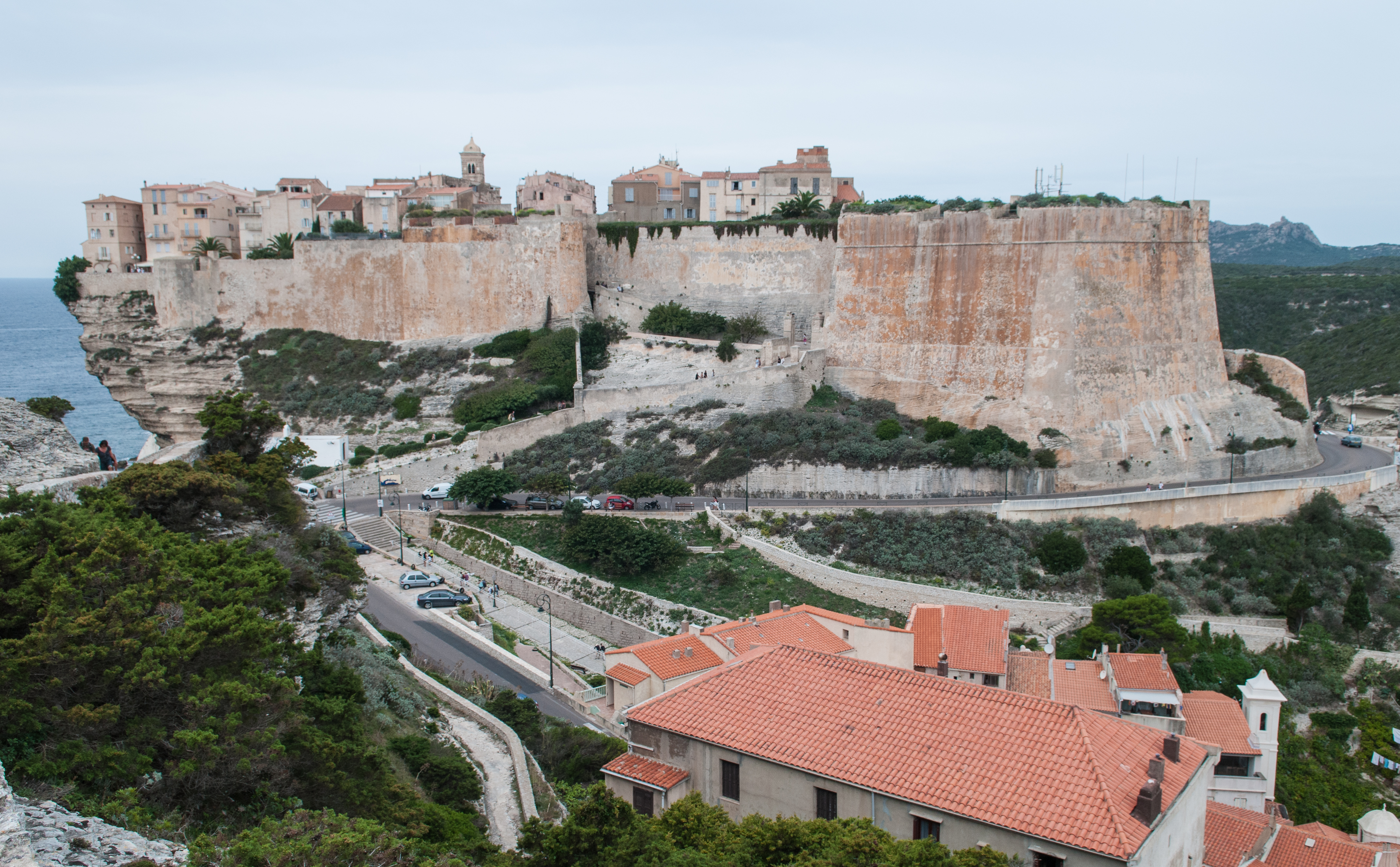
The citadel

=== Prehistoric period ===
Bonifacio has two prehistoric sites of some importance: the ancient cave shelter of Araguina-Sennola near the village of Capello on Route N96 just north of the city and a chambered tomb of Vasculacciu further north near Figari. The first is the site of the notable Lady of Bonifacio, a female burial carbon-dated to about 6570 BC, which is either late Mesolithic or Early Neolithic, and the second belongs to the Megalithic Culture and is dated to the Middle Neolithic. The alignment of the two and the extensive use of chert from Monte Arci in Sardinia shows that the Bay of Bonifacio was a route to inland Corsica from the earliest times.

=== Roman period ===
The only record of southernmost Corsica in Roman times comes from the geographer Ptolemy. He reports the coordinates of Marianum Promontory and town, which, plotted on a map, turn out to be the farthest south of Corsica. After listing the peoples of the east coast he states that the Subasani (ancient Greek Soubasanoi) were "more to the south."

The people do not appear subsequently and the town and promontory have not been identified, nor do any Roman roads point to it. The only official road, the Via Corsica, ran between the Roman castra of Mariana and Aleria on the east coast and further south to Pallas, according to the Antonine Itinerary. Ptolemy places Pallas unequivocally on the east coast north of Marianum. Although unrecorded tracks and paths to the far south are possible, it is unlikely they would have carried any significant Roman traffic.

Maritime traffic through the strait however was significant and it could hardly have neglected the fine harbour at Bonifacio. The most popular choice for Marianum Promontory therefore is Cape Pertusato, southernmost point of Corsica island, about 9 kilometers (6 mi) east of the harbor, with Bonifacio itself as Marianum town. A second possibility would be the first century AD Roman ruins adjoining Piantarella Beach near the village of Ciappili and next to the grounds of Sperone golf course, a recreational suburb to the west of Bonifacio, but those ruins appear to represent a Roman villa and the beach though eminently suitable for recreation is of little value as a port. More likely the villa belonged to a citizen of Bonifacio as Marianum.

=== Tuscan period ===
Corsica was taken from the Roman Empire in 469 by Genseric, king of the Vandals, and recovered by the Eastern Empire in 534. The Lombards having taken it again in 725, Charlemagne cleared them out by 774 and handed the island over to the Papacy, which had been the most powerful complainant of the island's devastation by Germanic peoples. Starting in 806 the Moors of Spain began to contend for the island and held it for a short time but in 828 the Papacy assigned its defense to the margrave of Tuscany, a powerful state of the Holy Roman Empire nominally under the Kingdom of Italy.

The city in evidence today was founded as a fortress by and subsequently named after Boniface II of Tuscany in 828. He had led a naval expedition to suppress the Saracens of North Africa and returned to build an unassailable fortress and naval base from which the domains of Tuscany could be defended at the outermost frontier. Most of the citadel postdates the 9th century or is of uncertain date but Il Torrione, a round tower, was certainly part of the original citadel.

== Climate ==
Bonifacio has a Mediterranean climate (Köppen climate classification Csa). The average annual temperature in Bonifacio is 16.8 °C (62.2 °F). The average annual rainfall is 582.2 mm (22.92 in) with November as the wettest month. The temperatures are highest on average in August, at around 24.8 °C (76.6 °F), and lowest in February, at around 10.5 °C (50.9 °F). The highest temperature ever recorded in Bonifacio was 39.7 °C (103.5 °F) on 23 July 2009; the coldest temperature ever recorded was −4.2 °C (24.4 °F) on 23 January 1963.

Climate data for Bonifacio, Corse-du-Sud (Cape Pertusato) 1991–2020 averages, extremes 1917–present)
Month	Jan	Feb	Mar	Apr	May	Jun	Jul	Aug	Sep	Oct	Nov	Dec	Year
Record high °C (°F)	22.8 (73.0)	23.4 (74.1)	26.0 (78.8)	26.4 (79.5)	33.4 (92.1)	35.4 (95.7)	39.7 (103.5)	39.1 (102.4)	33.7 (92.7)	30.6 (87.1)	26.4 (79.5)	21.2 (70.2)	39.7 (103.5)
Mean maximum °C (°F)	16.0 (60.8)	16.7 (62.1)	18.6 (65.5)	22.0 (71.6)	26.1 (79.0)	30.4 (86.7)	33.7 (92.7)	33.5 (92.3)	29.2 (84.6)	25.9 (78.6)	21.8 (71.2)	17.8 (64.0)	34.6 (94.3)
Mean daily maximum °C (°F)	13.0 (55.4)	12.9 (55.2)	14.5 (58.1)	16.9 (62.4)	20.4 (68.7)	24.2 (75.6)	27.0 (80.6)	28.0 (82.4)	24.9 (76.8)	21.3 (70.3)	17.1 (62.8)	14.1 (57.4)	19.5 (67.1)
Daily mean °C (°F)	10.7 (51.3)	10.5 (50.9)	12.0 (53.6)	14.1 (57.4)	17.5 (63.5)	21.2 (70.2)	24.0 (75.2)	24.8 (76.6)	21.9 (71.4)	18.7 (65.7)	14.7 (58.5)	11.8 (53.2)	16.8 (62.2)
Mean daily minimum °C (°F)	8.4 (47.1)	8.0 (46.4)	9.4 (48.9)	11.2 (52.2)	14.5 (58.1)	18.1 (64.6)	20.9 (69.6)	21.7 (71.1)	18.9 (66.0)	16.1 (61.0)	12.3 (54.1)	9.5 (49.1)	14.1 (57.4)
Mean minimum °C (°F)	3.6 (38.5)	3.6 (38.5)	4.4 (39.9)	7.2 (45.0)	10.7 (51.3)	14.5 (58.1)	18.0 (64.4)	18.7 (65.7)	14.6 (58.3)	11.3 (52.3)	7.2 (45.0)	4.4 (39.9)	1.8 (35.2)
Record low °C (°F)	−4.2 (24.4)	−3.4 (25.9)	−2.0 (28.4)	2.0 (35.6)	6.2 (43.2)	5.0 (41.0)	9.8 (49.6)	10.0 (50.0)	8.6 (47.5)	1.4 (34.5)	1.2 (34.2)	−1.0 (30.2)	−4.2 (24.4)
Average precipitation mm (inches)	60.6 (2.39)	48.7 (1.92)	51.9 (2.04)	54.2 (2.13)	39.9 (1.57)	18.1 (0.71)	7.1 (0.28)	12.5 (0.49)	55.5 (2.19)	74.5 (2.93)	89.2 (3.51)	70.0 (2.76)	582.2 (22.92)
Average precipitation days (≥ 1.0 mm)	7.8	6.7	6.6	6.7	4.6	2.4	0.8	1.6	5.3	7.3	9.9	8.8	68.5
Source: Météo France Infoclimat

Comparison of local Meteorological data with other cities in France
Town	Sunshine (hours/yr)	Rain (mm/yr)	Snow (days/yr)	Storm (days/yr)	Fog (days/yr)
National average	1,973	770	14	22	40
Bonifacio	N/A	541.9	1.8	23.8	18.5
Paris	1,661	637	12	18	10
Nice	2,724	767	1	29	1
Strasbourg	1,693	665	29	29	56
Brest	1,605	1,211	7	12	75

== Population ==
Historical population

Year	Pop.	±% p.a.
1800	3,181	—
1806	3,105	−0.40%
1821	2,479	−1.49%
1831	2,944	+1.73%
1836	3,031	+0.58%
1841	3,017	−0.09%
1846	3,271	+1.63%
1851	3,383	+0.68%
1856	3,100	−1.73%
1861	3,453	+2.18%
1866	3,594	+0.80%
1872	3,616	+0.10%
1876	3,375	−1.71%
1881	3,116	−1.58%
1886	3,357	+1.50%
1891	3,703	+1.98%
1896	3,858	+0.82%
1901	4,188	+1.66%

Year	Pop.	±% p.a.
1906	3,797	−1.94%
1911	3,660	−0.73%
1921	2,816	−2.59%
1926	2,688	−0.93%
1931	3,331	+4.38%
1936	3,628	+1.72%
1946	2,048	−5.56%
1954	2,157	+0.65%
1962	2,418	+1.44%
1968	2,431	+0.09%
1975	2,693	+1.47%
1982	2,736	+0.23%
1990	2,683	−0.24%
1999	2,658	−0.10%
2007	2,852	+0.88%
2012	2,950	+0.68%
2017	3,118	+1.11%
2023	3,344	+1.17%

Source: EHESS and INSEE (1968-2023)

== Sights ==
The town's charm and proximity to idyllic beaches makes it a popular tourist destination in the summer, predominantly for residents of mainland France.

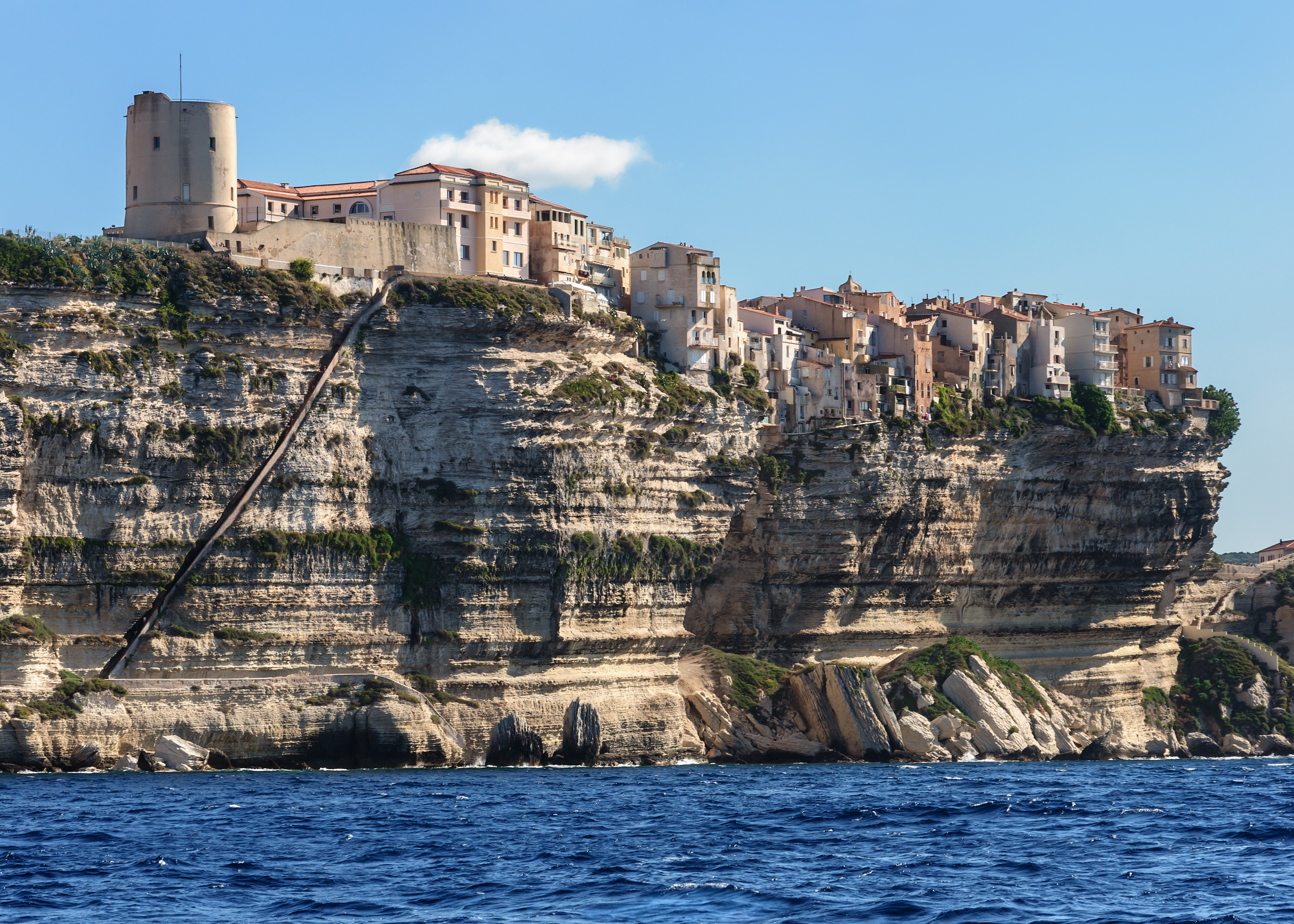
Bonifacio above the sea. The King of Aragon's Staircase is on the left of the cliff.

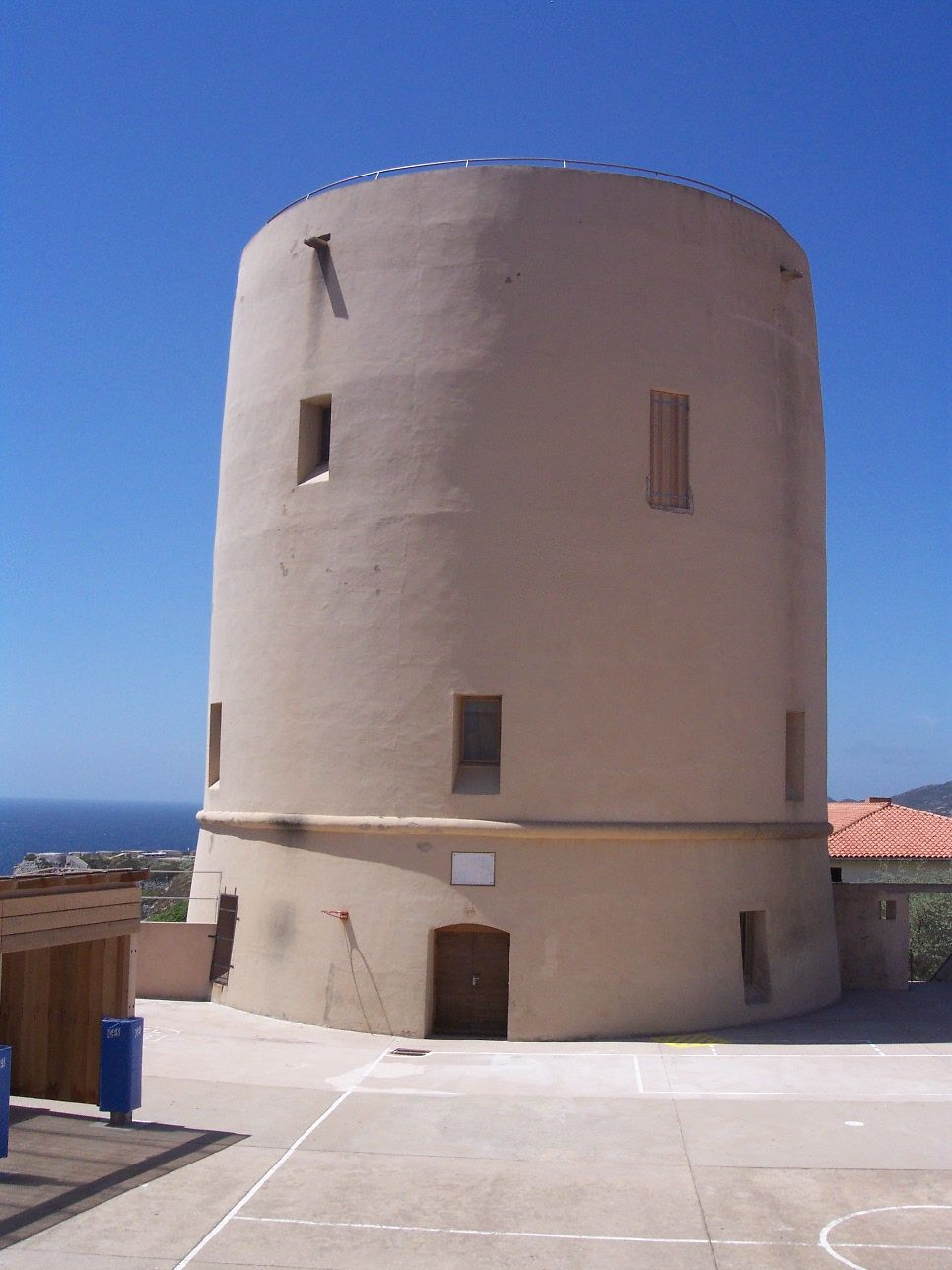
Il Torrione

Two Genoese towers are in the neighbourhood:

- Torra di Sant'Amanza
- Torra di Sponsaglia
- Église Saint-Dominique de Bonifacio
- Église Sainte-Marie-Majeure de Bonifacio

== Beaches and recreation ==
- La Tonnara Beach

== Transportation ==
The town is served by Figari airport (car or taxi required), and ferry service to Sardinia is available multiple times daily.

== Personalities ==
The following persons of note were born in Bonifacio:

- Tommaso Maria Zigliara (1833–1893), Roman Catholic cardinal, theologian, and philosopher.
- The film star Marie-José Nat.

== See also ==
- Communes of the Corse-du-Sud department
