= Porto-Vecchio =

Commune in Corsica, France

Porto-Vecchio Purtivechju (Corsican)
- Commune
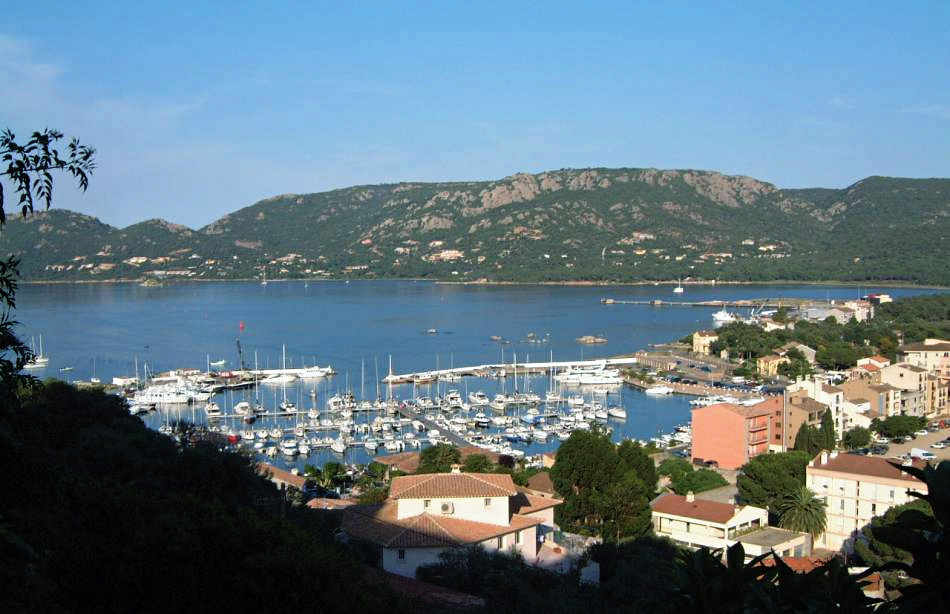
- A view of Porto-Vecchio, looking across the Gulf of Porto-Vecchio, with the marina in the foreground and the ferry pier beyond

- Coat of arms
- Location of Porto-Vecchio
- Location within France Location within Corsica
- Coordinates: 41°35′30″N 9°16′49″E
- Country: France
- Region: Corsica
- Department: Corse-du-Sud
- Arrondissement: Sartène
- Canton: Bavella and Grand Sud

Government
  - Mayor (2020–2026): Jean-Christophe Angelini
- Area^{1}: 168.65 km^{2} (65.12 sq mi)
- Elevation: 40 m (130 ft)
- Highest elevation: 1,316 m (4,318 ft)
- Lowest elevation: 0 m (0 ft)
- Population (2023): 11,198
  - Density: 66.398/km^{2} (171.97/sq mi)
- Demonym(s): Porto-Vecchiais (French) portivechjacciu (Corsican) (North) purtivichjacciu (Corsican) (South)
- Time zone: UTC+01:00 (CET)
  - Summer (DST): UTC+02:00 (CEST)
- INSEE/Postal code: 2A247 /20137
- ^{1} French Land Register data, which excludes lakes, ponds, glaciers > 1 km^{2} (0.386 sq mi or 247 acres) and river estuaries.

Porto-Vecchio (/ˌpɔːrtoʊ ˈvɛkioʊ/, French: [pɔʁto vekjo]; Italian: Porto Vecchio or Portovecchio [ˌpɔrtoˈvɛkkjo]; Corsican: Portivechju [ˌportiˈbecu], Portivecchju [ˌpɔrtiˈvɛtju], or Purtivechju [ˌpurtiˈvetju] (South)) is a commune in the French department of Corse-du-Sud, on the island of Corsica.

Porto-Vecchio is a medium-sized port city placed on a good harbor, the southernmost of the marshy and alluvial east side of Corsica. It is the seat of two cantons: Bavella and Grand Sud.

== Prehistory ==
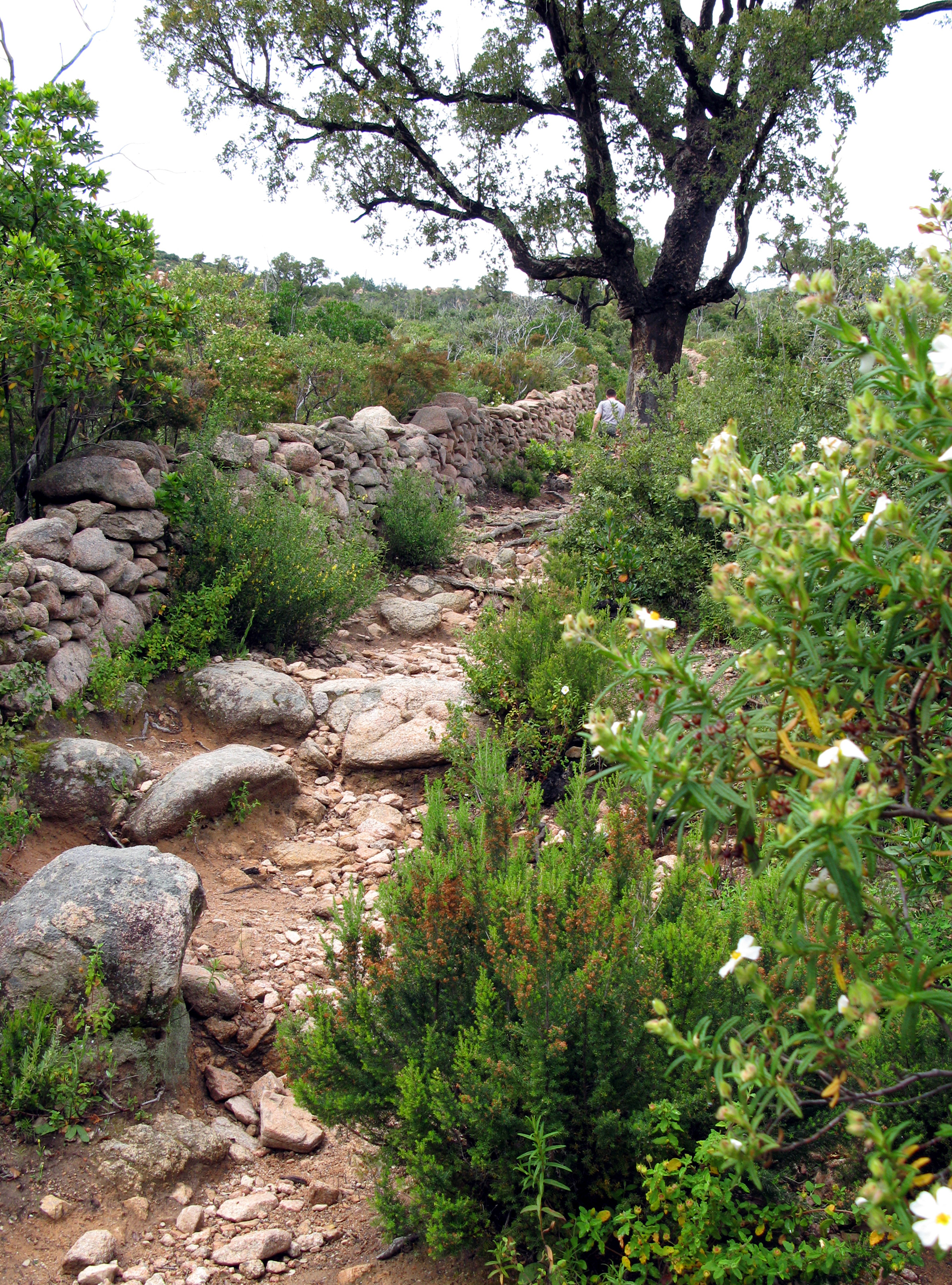
Ancient path at Araghju

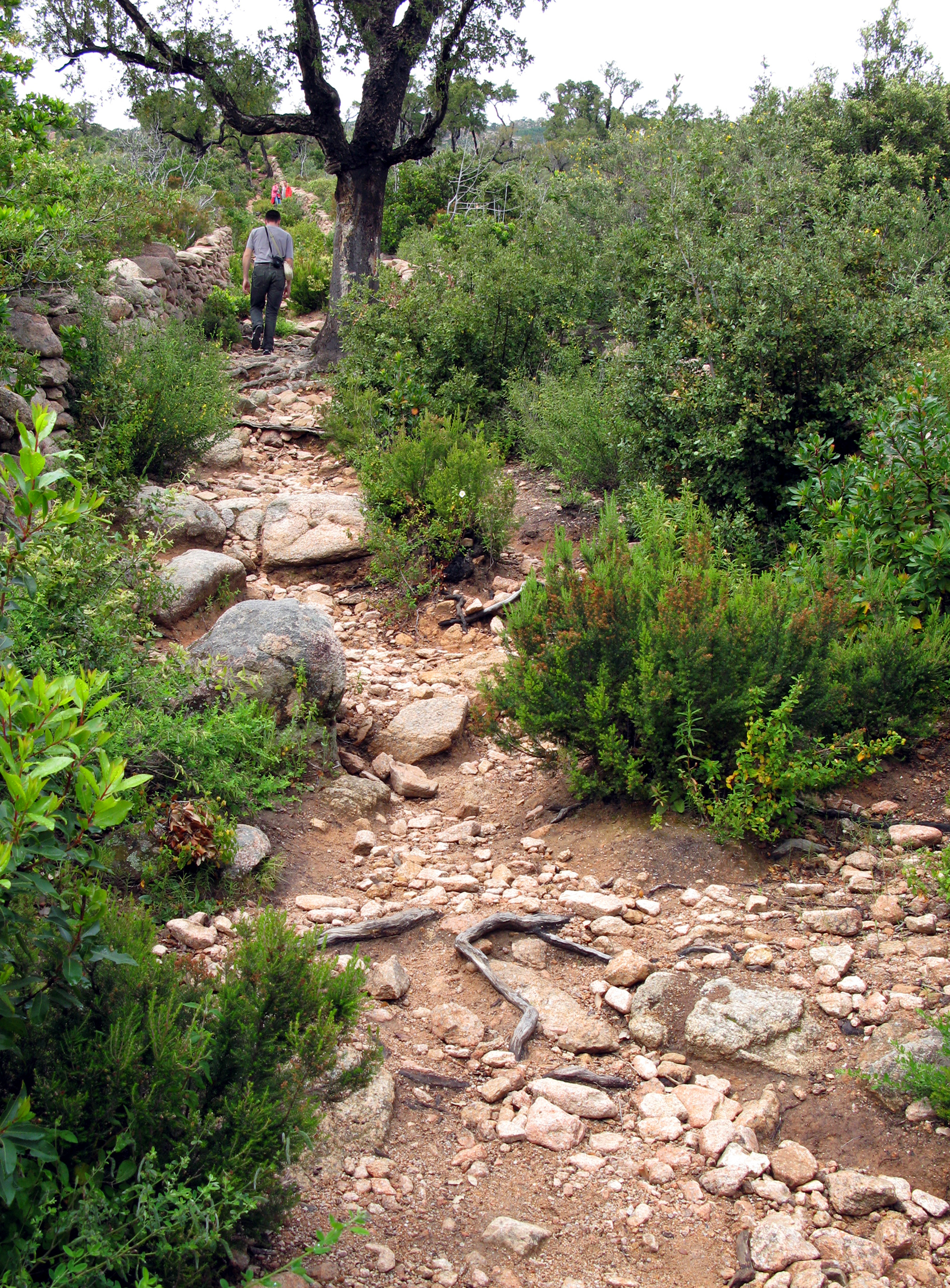
Ancient path, different view

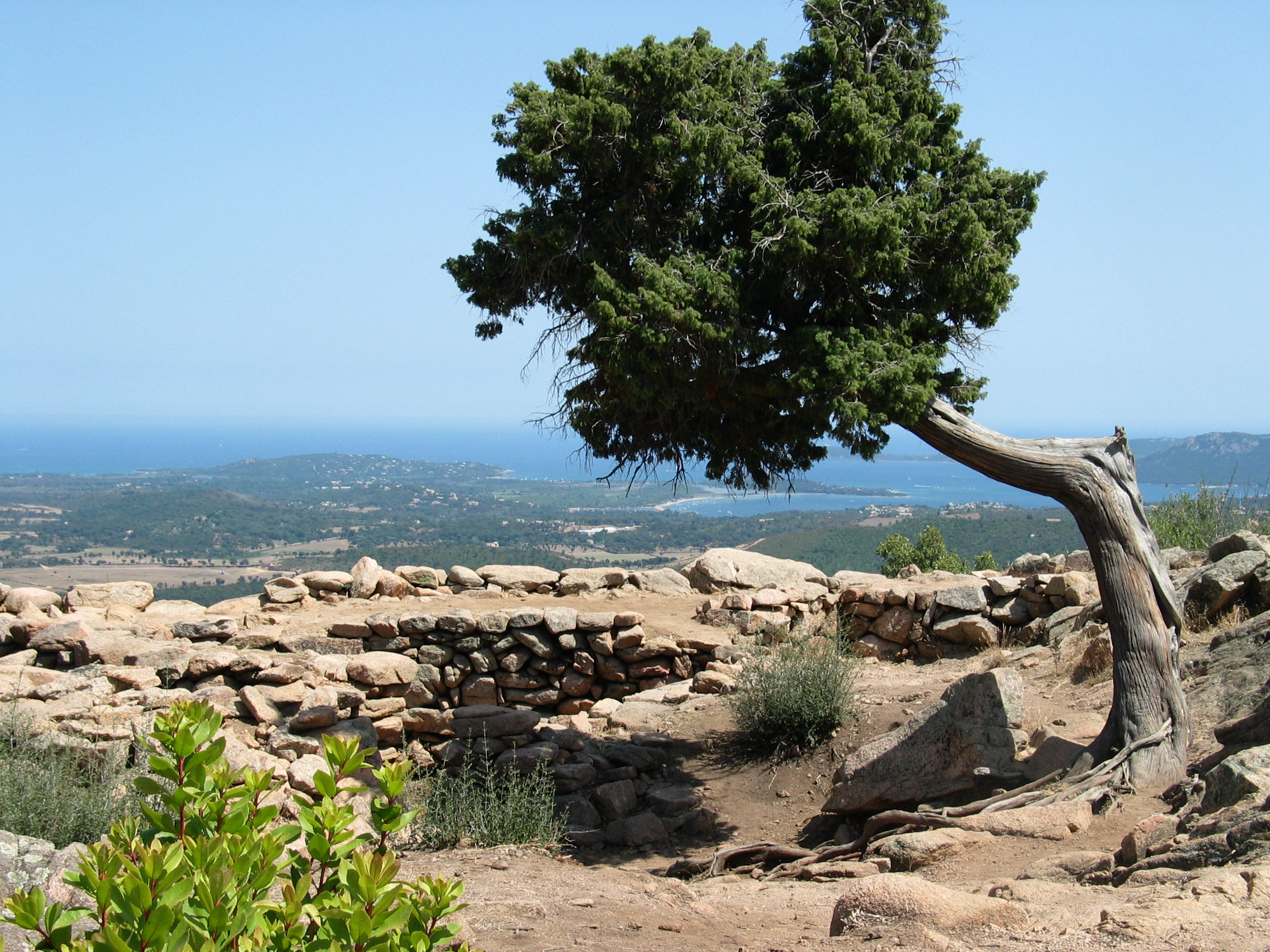
View from the Bronze Age citadel at Araghju

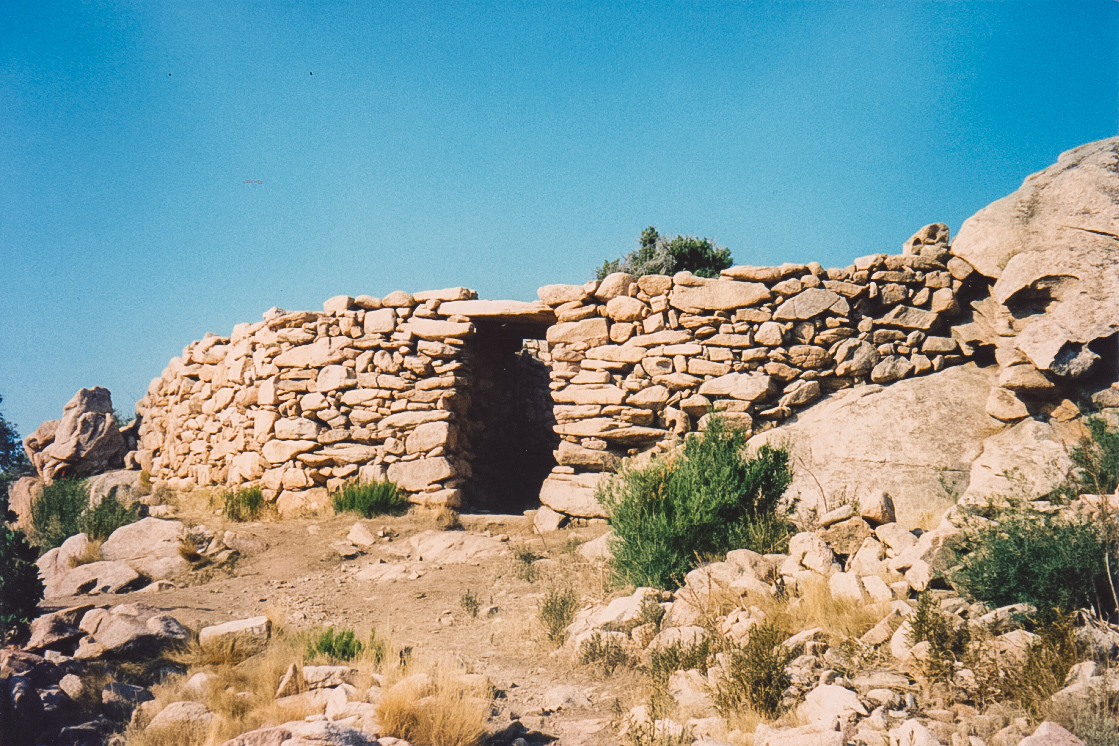
Casteddu d'Araghju

To the north of the commune is to be found the prehistoric site of Torré, which has given its name to the Torréen Culture. Dated to the Corsican Bronze Age, it features circular or semi-circular (abutting) citadels of stone.

In the direction of Figari, the hamlet of Ceccia also has prehistoric remains, and not far away is another Torréen site, Castellu di Tappa. Castellu d'Araghju is at 45 meters (148 ft), just above the village of Araggio. It has a circuit wall 2 meters (6 ft 7 in) thick and 4 meters (13 ft) high.

West of the commune is the prehistoric site of Tivulaghju.

== History ==
Porto-Vecchio is placed in a region that in earlier times was marshy and suffered greatly from malaria; however, the anchorage for a port is excellent. The name means "Old Port", which may refer to the Roman port that left traces in the vicinity. Subsequently, the region was more or less abandoned because of the malarial marshes but became part of a large Christian parish. The city was refounded in 1539 by the Bank of Saint George at Genoa on a 70 meters (230 ft) hill overlooking the gulf. They already had a presence in Bastia.

The Genoese were careful to preserve the Roman port within the walls, which are trapezoidal and enclose the main square, place de la République, near the church, Église St.-Jean Baptiste. The Genoese intended a colonia, or replacement of the population, but malaria soon killed most of the Genoese settlers. Another colony in 1546 suffered the same fate and subsequently the colony became a conurbation instead.

Sempiero Corso occupied the city for a few months in 1564.

Some of the population began to return with the drainage projects instituted under the Second Empire, but they were minimally successful. World War II brought the presence of allies who were determined to eradicate malaria for the health of all concerned, but especially the soldiers and airmen. Through drainage, filling and spraying they succeeded, making the region newly attractive because less pestilential. The current population derives from an expansion that started about 1950.

== Geography ==
The commune of Porto-Vecchio is 64 kilometers (40 mi) east of Sartène. The north shore of the gulf has many resorts, such as Benedettu, Marina di Fiori, and others of the commune of Lecci. The east coast, a shore with cliffs, is less habitable; beyond Chiappa Point (a naturist site) the coast goes southwest to the border of Bonifacio commune. The commune has an area of 168.65 km^{2} (65.12 sq mi), of which 120.70 km^{2} (46.60 sq mi) is forest.

Off the southeast shore are the four îles Cerbicale (seldom shown on the map but visible from satellite photographs), protected by a nature reserve of 36 hectares (89 acres), which are part of the larger reserve of Bouches de Bonifacio ("Straits of Bonifacio"; see under Bonifacio). From north to south are: Forana; Maestro Maria, the smallest; Piana, the largest, which ascends to 36 meters (118 ft) and Pietrocaggiosa a little more distant.

Hills to the northwest are included in the national park; the village of Ospedale there probably takes its name and origin from a large ancient hospital of the Roman era. It never lost that function but continues as a health center employing about 150 people. Nearby is a reservoir, the Lac de l'Ospedale, created with a dam at the foot of punta di Corbu in the forest of Ospedale. These hills culminate at the 1,314 meters (4,311 ft) "peak of the dead cow" (punta di a Vacca Morta).

=== Climate ===
Porto-Vecchio has a hot-summer mediterranean climate (Köppen climate classification Csa). The average annual temperature in Porto-Vecchio is 17.5 °C (63.5 °F). The average annual rainfall is 599.4 mm (23.60 in) with November as the wettest month. The temperatures are highest on average in August, at around 26.1 °C (79.0 °F), and lowest in February, at around 10.8 °C (51.4 °F). The highest temperature ever recorded in Porto-Vecchio was 41.0 °C (105.8 °F) on 11 July 1968; the coldest temperature ever recorded was −2.9 °C (26.8 °F) on 10 February 1986.

Climate data for Porto-Vecchio (La Chiappa) (1991–2020 normals, extremes 1932−present)
Month	Jan	Feb	Mar	Apr	May	Jun	Jul	Aug	Sep	Oct	Nov	Dec	Year
Record high °C (°F)	23.4 (74.1)	25.8 (78.4)	27.0 (80.6)	27.6 (81.7)	31.6 (88.9)	38.4 (101.1)	41.0 (105.8)	40.7 (105.3)	36.0 (96.8)	31.5 (88.7)	26.2 (79.2)	25.0 (77.0)	41.0 (105.8)
Mean daily maximum °C (°F)	13.9 (57.0)	14.1 (57.4)	16.1 (61.0)	18.5 (65.3)	22.6 (72.7)	27.0 (80.6)	30.2 (86.4)	30.6 (87.1)	26.6 (79.9)	22.6 (72.7)	18.0 (64.4)	14.9 (58.8)	21.3 (70.3)
Daily mean °C (°F)	10.9 (51.6)	10.8 (51.4)	12.5 (54.5)	14.8 (58.6)	18.5 (65.3)	22.6 (72.7)	25.6 (78.1)	26.1 (79.0)	22.7 (72.9)	19.1 (66.4)	14.9 (58.8)	12.0 (53.6)	17.5 (63.5)
Mean daily minimum °C (°F)	7.8 (46.0)	7.4 (45.3)	9.0 (48.2)	11.0 (51.8)	14.5 (58.1)	18.2 (64.8)	21.0 (69.8)	21.6 (70.9)	18.7 (65.7)	15.6 (60.1)	11.9 (53.4)	9.0 (48.2)	13.8 (56.8)
Record low °C (°F)	−2.0 (28.4)	−2.9 (26.8)	−0.2 (31.6)	3.3 (37.9)	1.1 (34.0)	9.6 (49.3)	12.2 (54.0)	12.0 (53.6)	10.8 (51.4)	5.4 (41.7)	1.2 (34.2)	0.0 (32.0)	−2.9 (26.8)
Average precipitation mm (inches)	66.1 (2.60)	49.9 (1.96)	57.9 (2.28)	62.2 (2.45)	39.1 (1.54)	20.3 (0.80)	6.2 (0.24)	13.8 (0.54)	49.3 (1.94)	73.6 (2.90)	84.8 (3.34)	76.2 (3.00)	599.4 (23.60)
Average precipitation days (≥ 1.0 mm)	7.4	6.5	6.4	6.7	4.4	2.5	1.0	1.9	4.9	7.0	9.2	7.9	65.9
Source: Météo-France

== Demographics ==
Historical population

Year	Pop.	±% p.a.
1800	1,241	—
1806	1,438	+2.49%
1821	1,298	−0.68%
1831	1,738	+2.96%
1836	2,007	+2.92%
1841	2,015	+0.08%
1846	2,071	+0.55%
1851	1,971	−0.98%
1856	2,117	+1.44%
1861	2,290	+1.58%
1866	2,203	−0.77%
1872	1,811	−3.21%
1876	2,636	+9.84%
1881	2,655	+0.14%
1886	2,844	+1.38%
1891	3,018	+1.19%
1896	3,195	+1.15%
1901	3,353	+0.97%

Year	Pop.	±% p.a.
1906	3,512	+0.93%
1911	3,929	+2.27%
1921	4,242	+0.77%
1926	4,743	+2.26%
1931	4,746	+0.01%
1936	5,304	+2.25%
1946	3,339	−4.52%
1954	5,091	+5.41%
1962	4,494	−1.55%
1968	5,148	+2.29%
1975	7,510	+5.54%
1982	8,095	+1.08%
1990	9,307	+1.76%
1999	10,326	+1.16%
2007	11,326	+1.16%
2012	10,064	−2.34%
2017	12,042	+3.65%
2023	11,198	−1.20%

Source: EHESS and INSEE (1968-2023)

== Ecology ==
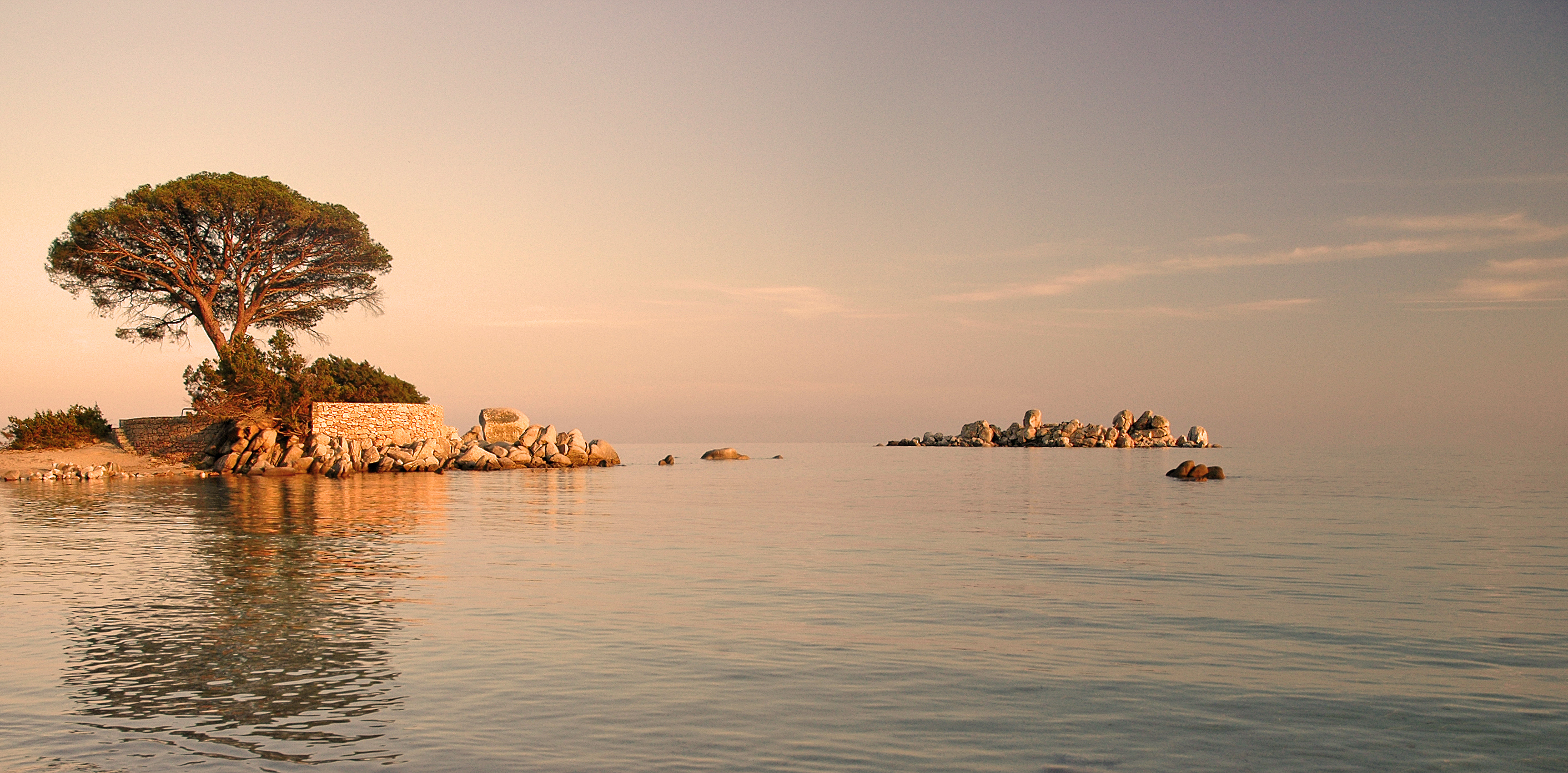
Islets off Palombaggia Beach, Corsica, 2005

The heights of l'Ospédale (u Spidali in Corsican, or Spedale in earlier literature) are noted for their forest of Corsican pines. Between them and the coast extends a plain drained by the Stabiacciu river, which flows into the Gulf of Porto-Vecchio through salt marshes, where cork oaks and eucalyptuses grow. Some marshland was used to make space for the modern city and the now inactive salt pans.

== Facilities ==
Porto-Vecchio is easily accessed through Figari–Sud Corse Airport, which is 24 kilometers (15 mi) away. It has a public high school and two community colleges, a private hospital of 107 beds, a medical school, a cork industry and extensive tourist facilities. The port includes moorings for 450 small craft, commercial facilities and a ferry station. The population expands to 50,000 in the summer, predominantly Italian. The beaches are well-populated, especially Palombaggia Beach 3 kilometers (2 mi) to the south-east. In 1983 it acquired a Film Institute, which organizes an annual film festival.

== Politics ==
List of recent mayors:

- Since March 2004 Georges Mela
- 1997–2004 Camille de Rocca Serra (UMP)
- –1997 Jean-Paul de Rocca Serra (RPR)

== Transport ==
This town is a terminus of a branch line of the now closed metre gauge Corsican Railways, which junctioned off the main system at Casamozza.

== Gallery ==
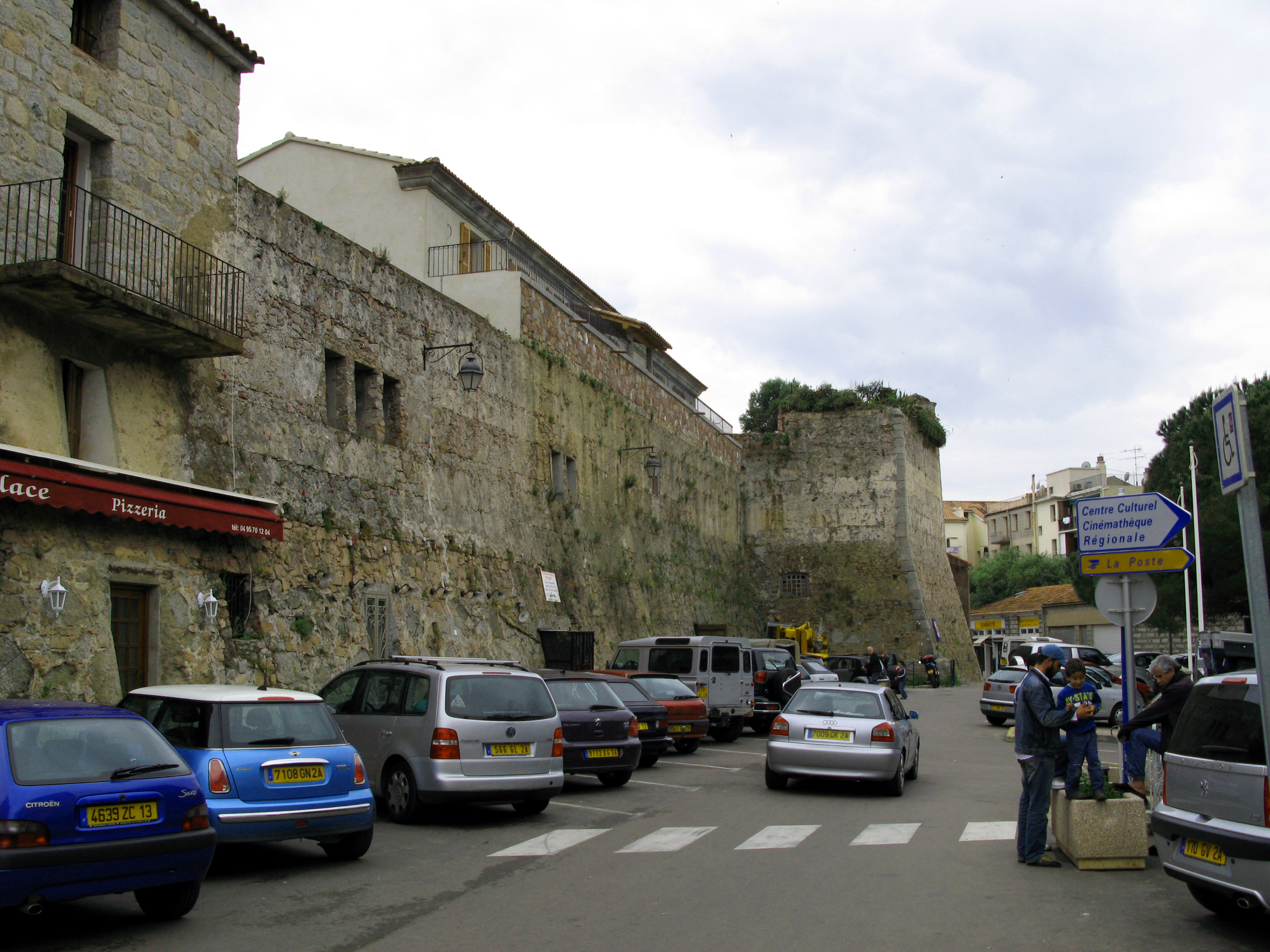
The bastion

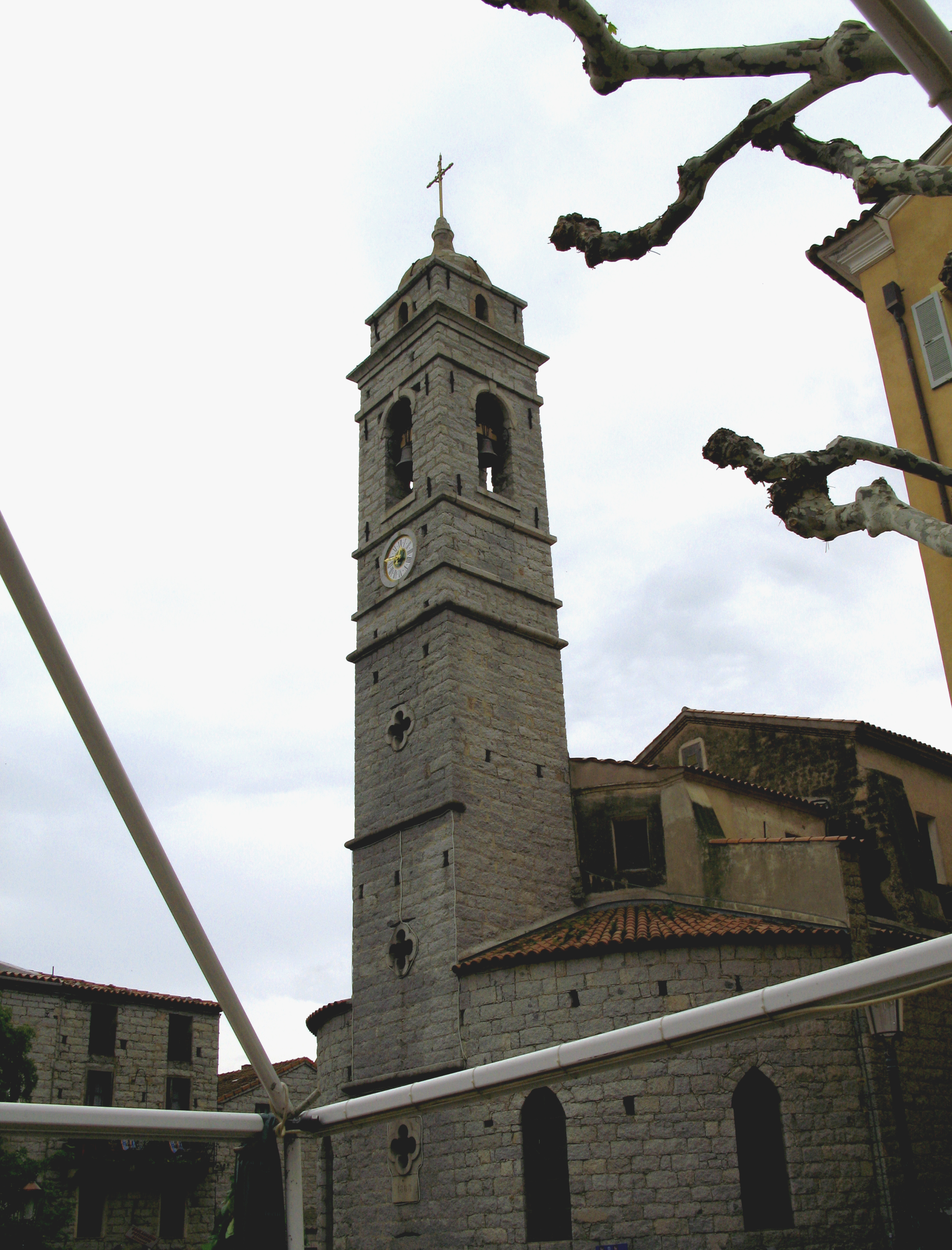
Église St-Jean-Baptiste

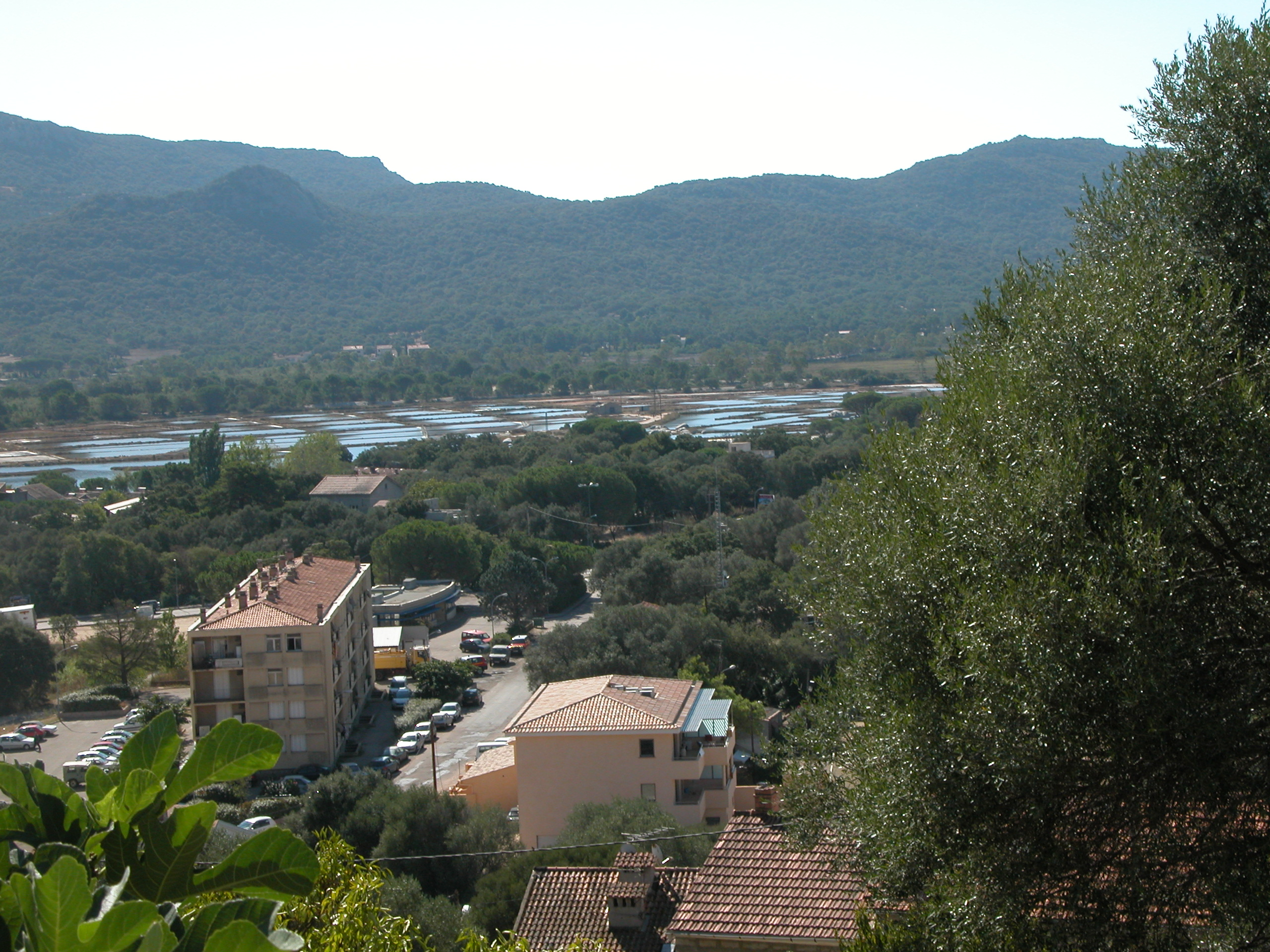
Salt pans

== See also ==
- Former railway station
