= Église Sainte-Marie-Majeure de Bonifacio =

Church in Corse-du-Sud, France

Coordinates: 41°23′14″N 9°9′32″E

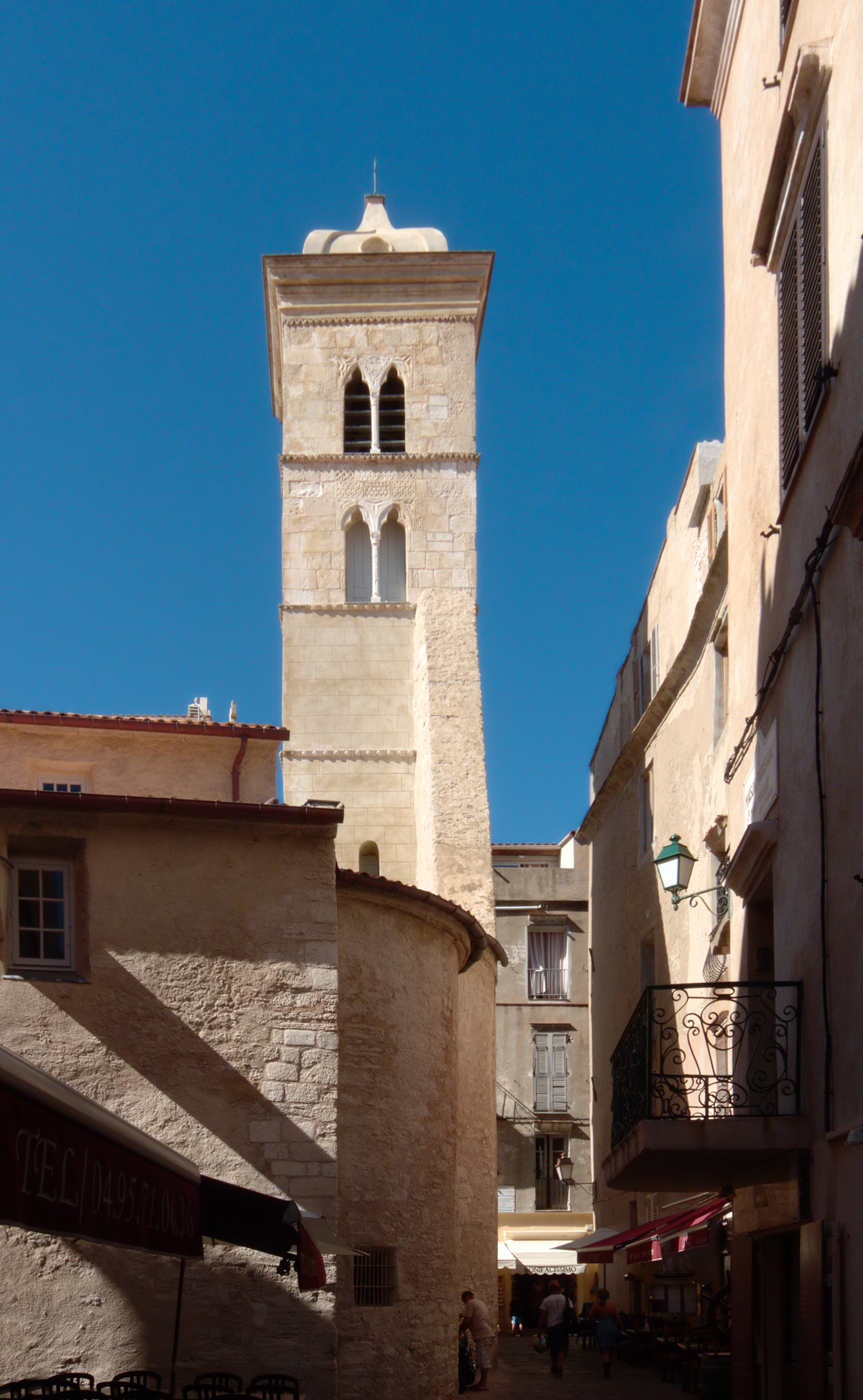
Église Saint-Dominique de Bonifacio

Église Sainte-Marie-Majeure de Bonifacio (Corsican: Ghjesgia Santa Maria Maiò) is a Roman Catholic church in Bonifacio, Corse-du-Sud, southeastern Corsica. The building was classified as a Historic Monument in 1982. It was built in the 12-13th century.
