= Jean Pérez (entomologist) =

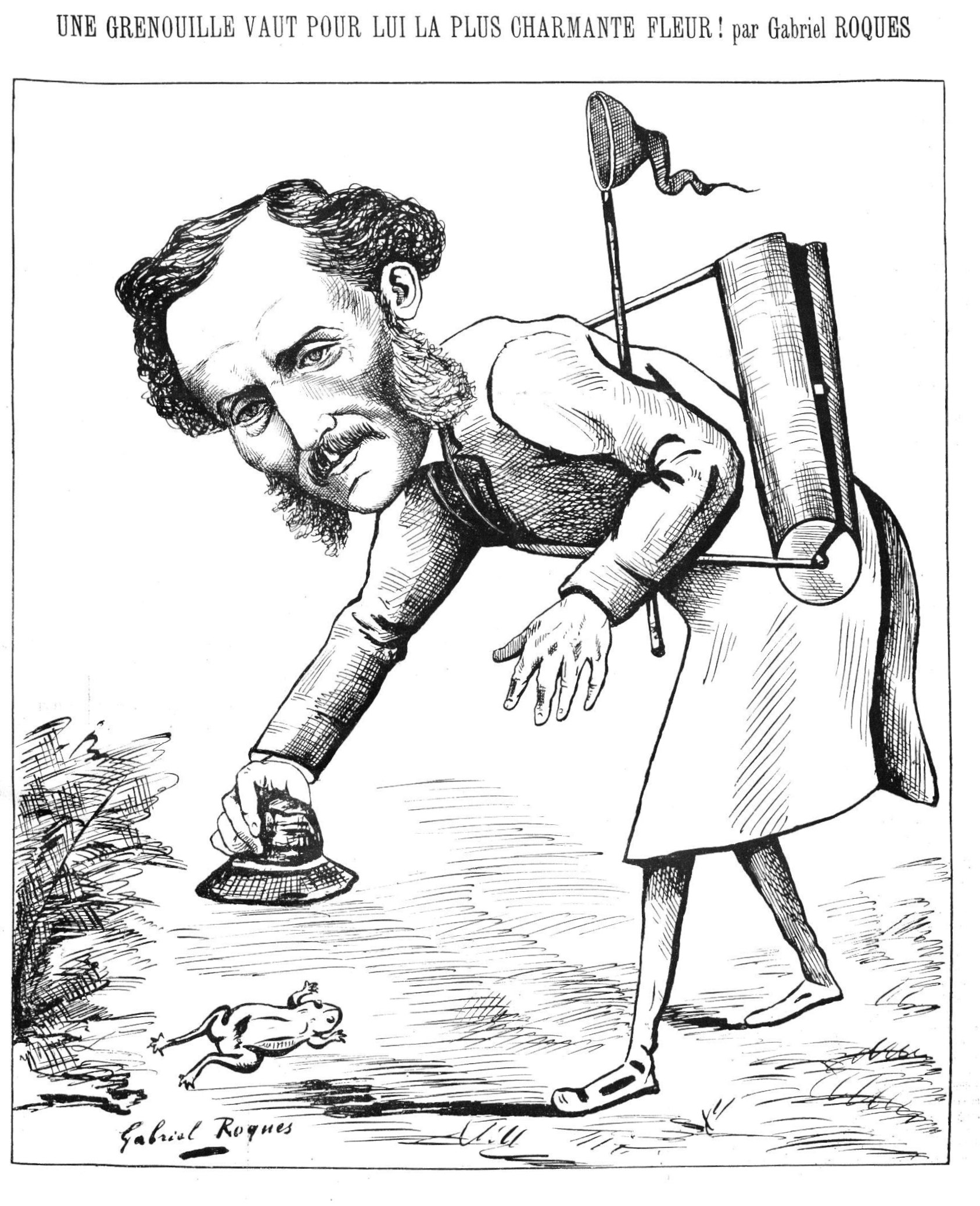
- Born: 4 December 1833
- Died: 11 September 1914 (aged 80)
- Citizenship: France
- Scientific career
- Fields: Entomology
- Thesis: Recherches sur l'Anguillule Terrestre (1866)

Jean Pérez (4 December 1833 – 11 September 1914) was a professor of zoology at the faculty of science in the University of Bordeaux. He took a special interest in the Hymenoptera and collaborated with Jean-Marie Léon Dufour and Jean-Henri Fabre.

Pérez was born in Tarbes and joined the University of Bordeaux in 1852 becoming a professor of zoology on 27 September 1867. He worked on anatomy and physiology, studying regeneration in cephalopods, reproduction in bees and an examination of the theory of Dzierzon, and segmentation in molluscs. In 1889 he published a book called Les Abeilles, a popular and influential examination of the life of bees which examined the evolution of flowers, bee society, and aural communication. He credited Johann Stahala of Dolein, Olmutz with identifying bee communication through varying sounds. He also worked on agricultural applications of entomology. In July 1892 he was made a Knight of the Legion of Honour. He was a member of the Linnean Society of Bordeaux from 1876. His publications numbered more than a 100. He described several new bee species including those from collections made in the Americas by Carlos Emilio Porter (1867‒1942) and Léon Diguet (1859‒1926). His son Charles Pérez was also an entomologist.
