= Bilger =

Origin
- Language: Middle High German
- Origin: Bilgerīm
- Meaning: "pilgrim"

Bilger is a surname. Notable people with the surname include:

- Audrey Bilger, American academic administrator
- Camille Bilger (1879–1947), French politician
- Grace Bilger (1907–2000), American painter
- Leonora Bilger (1893–1975), American chemist
- Pierre Bilger (1940–2011), French businessman
- Steffen Bilger (born 1979), German politician
- Joseph Bilger, French journalist born under the German rule and his son Philippe, a French judge (born de facto in the Gau Westmark)
