= Lauvray =

Lauvray is a surname. Notable people with the surname include:

- Abel Lauvray (1870–1950), French painter
- Léon Lauvray (1877–1965), French politician
