= Comités de défense paysanne =

Peasant Defence Committee
- Comités de Défense Paysanne
- Successor: Action de Défense Paysanne
- Formation: January 1929
- Founder: Henri Dorgères
- Founded at: Rennes, Brittany, French Third Republic
- Dissolved: 1939
- Type: Agrarian organization
- Purpose: Peasant rights, opposition to social security reforms, direct action
- Region served: Primarily northern France (Brittany, Normandy, etc.)
- Official language: French
- Youth Wing President: Modeste Legouez
- Key people: Henri Dorgères
- Main organ: Jeunesses Paysannes
- Affiliations: Front Paysan, Union nationale des syndicats agricoles
- Remarks: Known for direct action, anti-tax stance and paramilitary style uniforms

The Peasant Defence Committee (French: Comités de Défense Paysanne) was a network of radical agrarian peasant groups in France founded in 1929.

== Foundation ==
There had previously been groups that espoused agrarian militancy such as the "Assault Sections" of the secretive Franc-Paysannerie movement.

It was originally founded by an agricultural editor Henri Dorgères in January 1929 in Rennes, Brittany as the Comité de défense paysanne contre les assurances sociales, the promised extension of which was seen as unacceptably expensive to many small farms. Dorgères' credibility came from a popular service his newspaper offered to farmers which checked avertissements (land tax notices) for errors in the cadastral land surveys they were based on to reduce the taxes.

The historian Robert Paxton said there were three elements to the rise of militant right wing Peasant action in interwar France; an agricultural recession triggered by low farm prices, the Third Republic's cultural contempt for rural life and a lack of conventional political leadership for small farmers which meant that public policy was committed to cheap food for urban voters.

== Greenshirts ==
It had a youth section, the Jeunesses Paysannes, more commonly known as the Greenshirts which was how his general movement was often known. The Greenshirts got their name from a uniform, inspired by Joseph Bilger's Elsässischer Bauernbund in Alsace. They were involved in strikebreaking on farms (to “save the harvests”) and blocked seizures of property for nonpayment of taxes.

The first President of the Jeunesses Paysannes was Modeste Legouez, a future Senator for Eure who opposed the socialist leader Pierre Mendes France in the 1936 French legislative election.

== Ideology ==
A book written by Dorgeres during that time "Haut les fourches" ("Raise the Pitchforks") laid out an anti-Republican and anti-Parliamentary back to the land program. They were hostile to the agencies of the Third Republic, particularly teachers. The established links with anti-parliamentary groups such as the Fédération des contribuables and its leader Jacques Lemaigre-Dubreuil.

The Peasant Defense Committees were seen as differing from the more established and conservative Syndicats agricoles through a willingness to embrace direct action (including tax strikes and opposing foreclosure sales), a more egalitarian organisational structure that did not rely on aristocratic rural social hierarchies and the use of more militaristic attributes such as oaths and uniforms. Dorgères himself was regarded as a very skillful market day orator, in a rural culture where up until that point oratory had been overlooked.

== Peasant Front ==
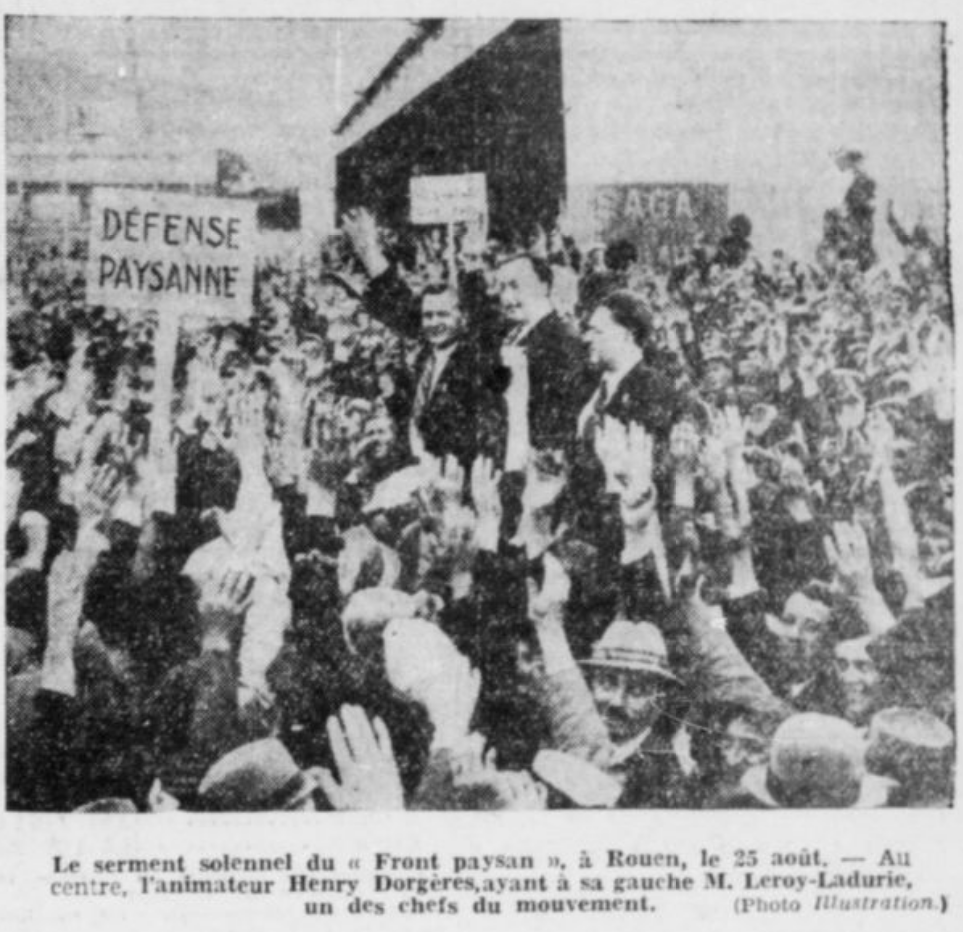
An image from La Liberté showing supporters of the Peasant Defence Committee at a Front paysan rally in Rouen, September 1935

In 1934 it would join up with the larger and more conservative Union nationale des syndicats agricoles and the politically eclectic French Agrarian and Peasant Party to form the Front paysan. This meant that the official stance of the Comités turned from calling for state support for agriculture to a more Corporatist stance where farmers would control the production and marketing of their produce. The rural elites represented by the UNSA also showed their radicalisation by allying with the Comités de défense paysanne.

Despite its common stance against the Popular Front government the front fell apart in 1936 due to differences in political strategy.

Although it was not listed among the far right leagues that the Popular Front government dissolved in 1936, the Minister of the Interior Roger Salengro did order prefects to keep close watch on the comités. During the previous election local activists had disrupted election meetings.

== Geographical spread ==
The Committees were far more widespread and popular in the North of France compared to the South of France. In the early years they were particularly strong in the Finistère region in the west of Brittany, but had quite a large presence across Brittany and Normandy. As well as the North West of France before the 1936 elections it also had some success in Algeria as well as parts of the Rhône, the Loire and the lower Pyrenées.

There was later success among market gardeners in Vaucluse and Var but no success in places such as the wine growing areas of the Midi. It kept out of other areas such as Alsace due to the presence of local groups such as the Elsässischer Bauernbund.

== End and aftermath ==
Its expansion stopped at the outbreak of the Second World War in 1939, although the organisation did manage to hold regional congresses that year. Dorgeres supported the National Revolution of Philippe Pétain and was named the general delegate for organization and propaganda for the Peasant Corporation, a Vichy government organization that tried to embody the agrarian corporatism that the Comités and their allies embodied. He supported Pétain from 1940 but was suspicious of the Germans due to his internment in the First World War.

Dorgeres was detained after the war for his work with the Peasant Corporation, tried and sentenced to ten years of indignité nationale although he was immediately released for his work with the resistance. In 1953 Dorgeres regained his citizenship rights and started Action de Défense Paysanne which revived a lot of the themes of the Comités and were active in many of the same areas. They had a cooperative but tense relationship with Paul Antier's Parti Paysan and Pierre Poujade's UCDA, for which Dorgeres was elected as a deputy.

== Sources ==
- d'Appollonia, Ariane Chebel (1998), L'extrême-droite en France: De Maurras à Le Pen (in French), Editions Complexe, ISBN 978-2-87027-764-5
- Bensoussan, David (2006-09-20), Fayard (ed.), Combats pour une Bretagne catholique et rurale: Les droites bretonnes dans l'entre-deux-guerres (in French), Fayard, ISBN 978-2-213-64181-2
- Bensoussan, David (2004). "Les droites en Bretagne dans l'Entre-deux-guerres. Tensions et déchirements dans un monde catholique et rural". Ruralia. 14.
- Bernet, J (1979), "Un Compiégnois célèbre dans l'entre-deux-guerres : Fleurant Agricola, fondateur du Parti Agraire", Annales historiques compiégnoises modernes et contemporaines, No. 6 1979 (in French)
- Charpon, Françoise; Léonard, Yves (2015), Pierre Mendès France, élu d'un département rural (in French), Presses universitaires de Rennes, ISBN 978-2-7535-2339-5
- Cordellier, Serge (2015), Organisations professionnelles agricoles: histoire et pouvoirs (in French), Cairn.info
- Dorgères, Henri (1959), Au XXe siècle : 10 ans de jacquerie (PDF) (in French), FeniXX réédition numérique, ISBN 978-2-307-06264-6
- Dreux, F. (1999), "R. O. Paxton, Le temps des chemises vertes [note critique]", Politix. Revue des sciences sociales du politique (in French)
- Handman, Marie-Elizabeth (1967), "Les agriculteurs et la politique depuis Méline", Après-Demain. Journal Mensuel de Documentation Politique (in French) (94–95)
- Hubscher, Ronald; Lagrave, Rose-Marie (1993), "Unité et pluralisme dans le syndicalisme agricole français - Un faux débat", Annales ESC (in French)
- Hubscher, Ronald (1996), "Robert O PAXTON, Le temps des Chemises vertes. Révoltes paysannes et fascisme rural, I929-1939, Paris, Éditions du Seuil, I996, 315", Cahiers d'Histoire (in French) (42–1), doi:10.4000/ch.22
- Irvine, William D. (1999), Forum on Robert O. Paxton, French Peasant Fascism
- Lynch, Édouard (2010), "Mobilisations paysannes et antiparlementarisme dans la première moitié du XXe siècle", Siècles (in French), 32, doi:10.4000/siecles.1008
- Ory, Pascal (1975), "Le dorgérisme, institution et discours d'une colère paysanne (1929-1939)", Revue d'Histoire Moderne et Contemporaine (in French), 22 (2): 168–190, doi:10.3406/rhmc.1975.2416
- Passmore, Kevin (2013), The Right in France from the Third Republic to Vichy (online ed.), Oxford: Oxford Academic, doi:10.1093/acprof:oso/9780199658206.003.0004, ISBN 9780191745034
- Paxton, Robert O. (1997-09-26), French Peasant Fascism : Henry Dorgeres' Greenshirts and the Crises of French Agriculture, 1929-1939, Oxford University Press, USA, ISBN 978-0-19-535474-4
- Allais, Jean-Luc (1997), "Paysans d'abord", Annales de Normandie, 47 (3): 243–264, doi:10.3406/annor.1997.4792
- Rissoan, Jean-Pierre (2002), Traditionalisme et révolution Volume 2 (in French), Lulu.com, ISBN 9781409277576
