= Patrick Kron =

French businessman

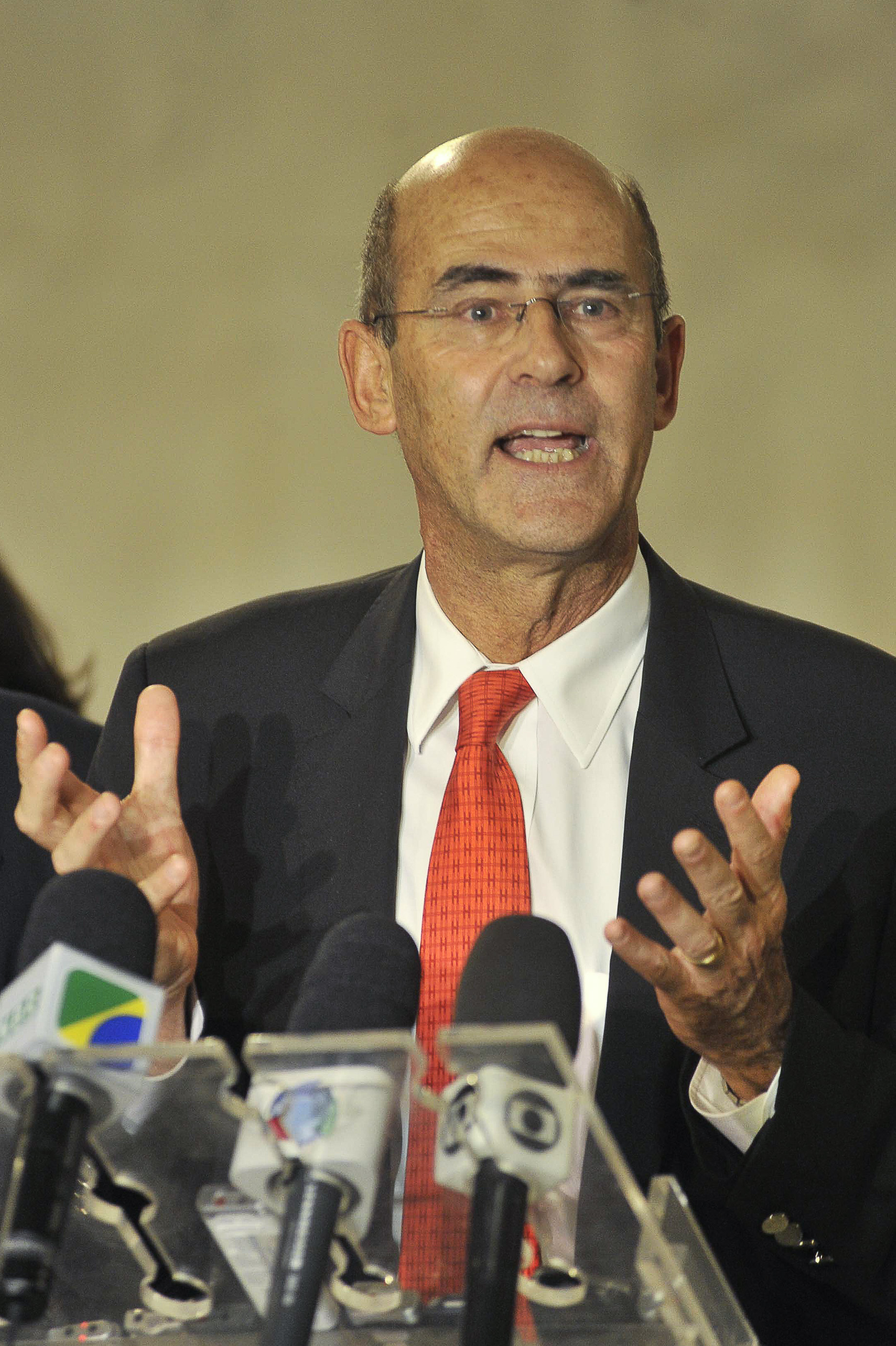
- Born: 26 September 1953 (age 72); Paris, France
- Education: Lycée Louis-le-Grand
- Alma mater: École Polytechnique; Mines ParisTech
- Occupation: CEO of Alstom (2003-2016)
- Predecessor: Pierre Bilger
- Successor: Henri Poupart-Lafarge

Patrick Kron (born 26 September 1953) was the chairman and chief executive (Président-directeur général) of the French engineering conglomerate Alstom. Alstom is most well known for its TGV trains, and is headquartered at Saint-Ouen. Since 2019, he has been chairman of the board for Imerys.

== Early life and education ==
Kron is the son of Polish-Jewish immigrants who survived the Nazi concentration camps and detention at the end of the 1940s, when they moved to France.

Kron started his education after high school at Collège-lycée Jacques-Decour as a young boy at the elite university École Polytechnique in Paris, and attended the École Nationale Supérieure des Mines.

== Career ==
=== Career in the public sector ===
Kron started his career at the French Ministry of Industry (Minister of the Economy, Finances and Industry, the Ministère de l'Économie, des Finances et du Commerce extérieur), where he worked from 1979 to 1984. From 1979 to 1983 he was stationed at the Direction régionale de l'Industrie, de la Recherche et de l'Environnement (DRIRE) in the Pays de la Loire.

=== Career in the private sector ===
From 1984 to 1997, Kron worked for Pechiney, becoming president of the Electrometallurgy Division, and later chairman of the board of the Carbone Lorraine Company from 1993 to 1997.

Kron became chief executive of Alstom on 1 January 2003. He became chairman of Alstom on 11 March 2003. While under Kron’s leadership, Alstom was investigated by the United States Department of Justice and ultimately agreed to pay a $772 million fine. Some mid-level Alstom executives were arrested in the United States, and then either enrolled as FBI informants in the company, or jailed as part of that investigation, such as Frédéric Pierucci. This forced Kron to warn his other executives not to travel to the United States to avoid such fate. In 2015, General Electric acquired Alstom’s power generation and transmission businesses; following the completion of that transaction, Kron retired as Alstom’s CEO.

The transaction was heavily criticized in France, as many in the French government considered the assets that were sold as strategic. France had initially blocked General Electric's acquisition of Alstom. But after Arnaud Montebourg's resignation as Minister of the Economy and Finance, he was replaced by Emmanuel Macron, who relented and approved the sale. Pierucci was released on bail during the same week of the purchase.

The affair is frequently presented in France as an example of hostage diplomacy and economic warfare by the United States government to favor large companies in commercial transactions. Indeed, the deal included the stipulation that General Electric would bare the responsibility for Alstom's judicial troubles in the United States, but the DoJ fined the remaining French leftover of Alstom anyway in December that year. Kron maintains that the controversial transaction was done for purely commercial reasons. As evidence, Kron points to General Electric's share price drop following the acquisition of Alstom's unprofitable assets, while Alstom recorded higher profits since the transaction.

In 2016, Kron started the international consulting firm PKC&I.

== Other activities ==
- Imerys, Chair of the Board of Directors (since 2019)
- Holcim, Member of the Board of Directors (since 2017)
- Truffle Capital, Chair (since 2016)
- Sanofi, Independent Member of the Board of Directors (since 2014)
- SEGULA Technologies, Member of the Board of Directors
- Viohalco, Non-Executive Member of the Board of Directors

== Honours ==
He was awarded the Légion d’honneur (Legion of Honour) on 30 September 2004 and became an Officer of National Order of Merit (Ordre national du Mérite) on 18 November 2007.

Business positions
Preceded by Pierre Bilger	CEO of Alstom; 2003–2016	Succeeded by Henri Poupart-Lafarge
