= Modeste Legouez =

French politician (1908–1989)

Sénateur
- In office 1959–1989
- Preceded by: Jean Brajeux
- Succeeded by: Jean Guénier
- Parliamentary group: Independent Republicans Group
- Constituency: Eure

Mayor
- In office 1971–1983
- President: Valéry Giscard d'Estaing
- Constituency: Épreville-près-le-Neubourg

Personal details
- Born: 24 September 1908 Épreville-près-le-Neubourg, Eure, French Third Republic
- Died: 30 January 1989 (aged 80) Épreville-près-le-Neubourg, Eure, French Fifth Republic

Modeste Legouez (1908–1989) was a French farmer in Normandy and senator for Eure from 1959 to 1989.

== Biography ==
Legouez was born on 24 September 1908 in Épreville-près-le-Neubourg, Normandy. He was a farmer of a reasonably large farm who inherited his land from his parents in 1930. He started in politics by becoming the first president of the Jeunesses Paysannes, popularly known as the "Greenshirts", the youth section of Henri Dorgères' far-right Comités de défense paysanne in the 1930s. He came within 700 votes of defeating the future prime minister Pierre Mendès France in the 1936 French legislative election in what Mendès France regarded as his hardest electoral fight.

Legouez became the head of the Peasant Corporation for the Eure from 1942 to 1944 for which he was interned for a few months after the liberation of France.

As a senator, Legouez was a member of the Independent Republicans Group.

Legouez was a knight of the Order of Agricultural Merit. He died on 30 January 1989.

== Sources ==
- Charpon, Françoise; Léonard, Yves (2015), Pierre Mendès France, élu d’un département rural, Presses universitaires de Rennes, ISBN 978-2-7535-2339-5
- Ory, Pascal (1975), "Le dorgérisme, institution et discours d'une colère paysanne (1929-1939)", Revue d'Histoire Moderne et Contemporaine, 22 (2): 168–190, doi:10.3406/rhmc.1975.2416
- Paxton, Robert O. (1997-09-26), French Peasant Fascism : Henry Dorgeres' Greenshirts and the Crises of French Agriculture, 1929-1939, Oxford University Press, USA, ISBN 978-0-19-535474-4
- Senate of France (2014), Legouez Modeste, Ancien sénateur de l'Eure, Senate of France
