= Lordonbahn =

Coordinates: 48.32595°N 7.17758°E

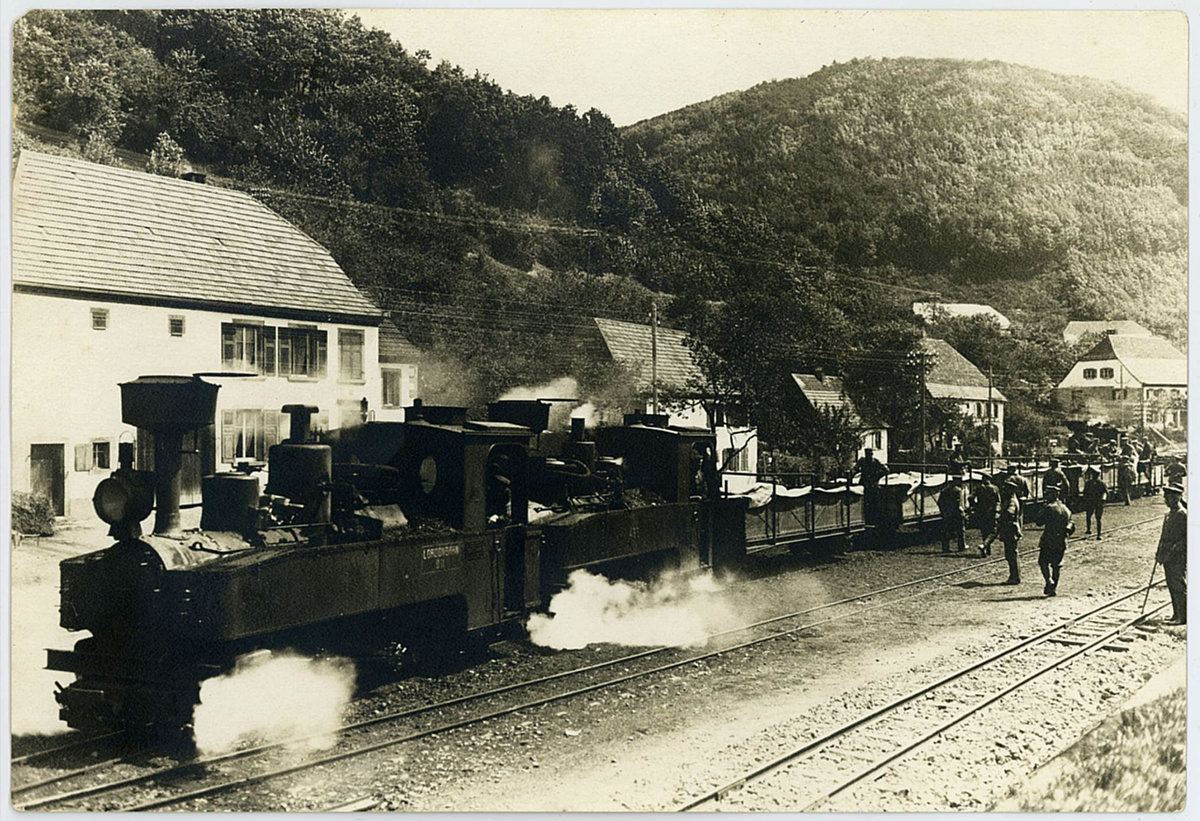
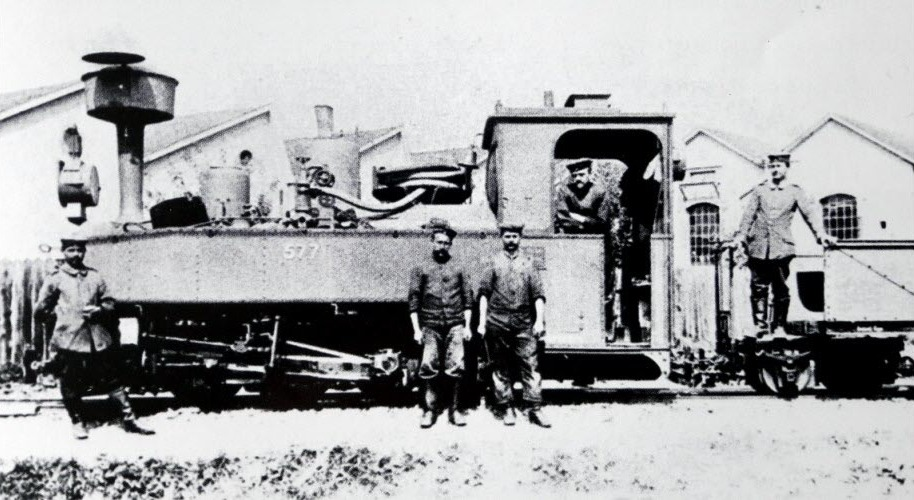
- Military locomotives N° 90 and N° 435 of the Lordonbahn: Train exiting the tramway station Urbeis in the direction of the tramway station at Passhöhe 28.5. – 3.6.1918 One of the military steam locomotives of the Lordonbahn

Technical
- Line length: 42 km (26 mi)
- Track gauge: 600 mm (1 ft 11 5/8 in)
Route map
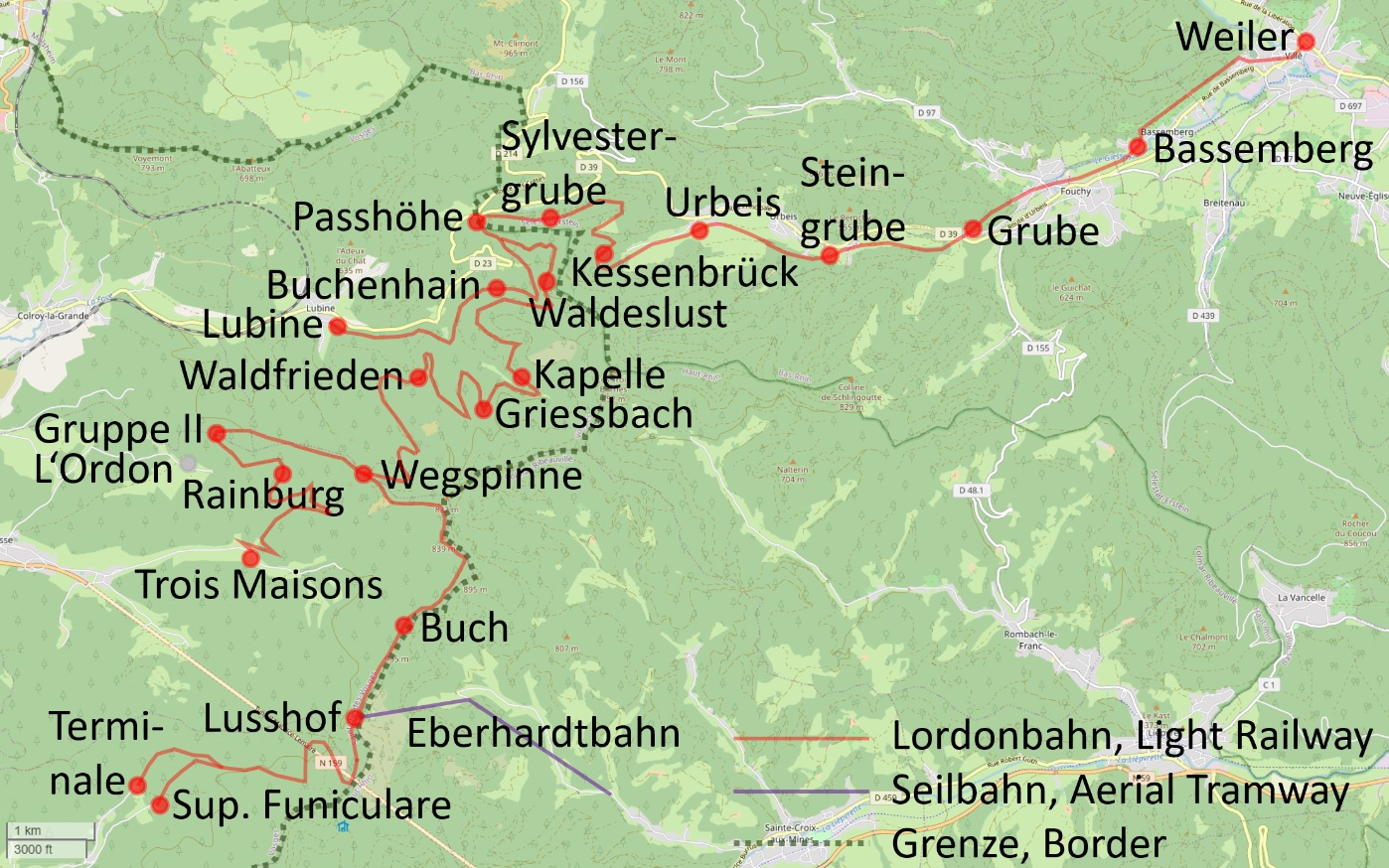
Route of the tramway superimposed onto a modern map

The Lordonbahn was a 42 km (26 mi) long narrow-gauge railway network with a gauge of 600 mm (1 ft 11 5/8 in) from Weiler (Villé) to Chaume de Lusse in the Vosges in France. It was laid and used in World War I to pass a height difference of more than 567 metres (1,860 ft).

== History ==
The light railway was built in early 1915 by German pioneers and Russian prisoners of war.

== Name ==
The Lordonbahn was named after the village of L'Ordon, which is 2.25 kilometres (1.40 mi) northeast of the Chaume de Lusse. Locals called the light railway Tacot Allemand.

== Route ==
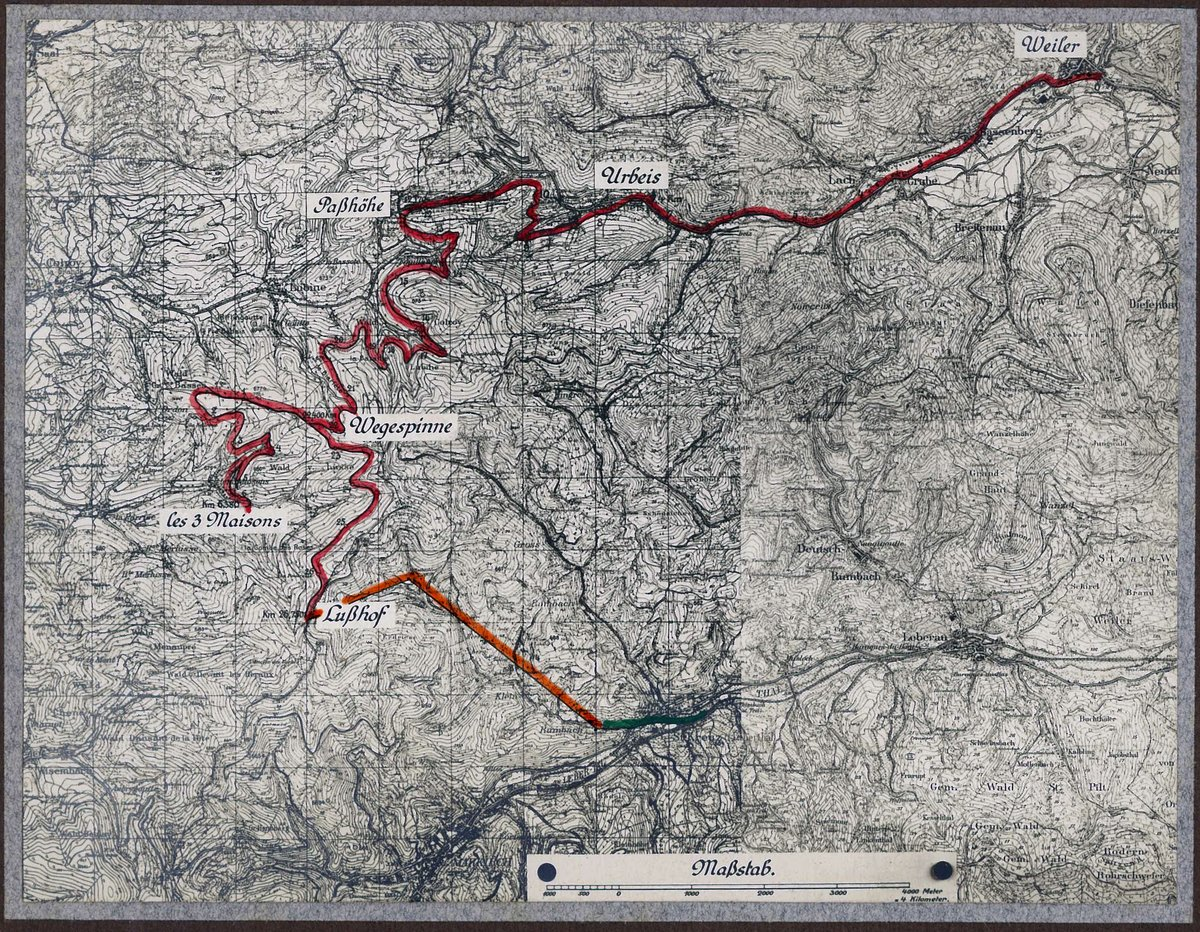
Route of the Lordonbahn

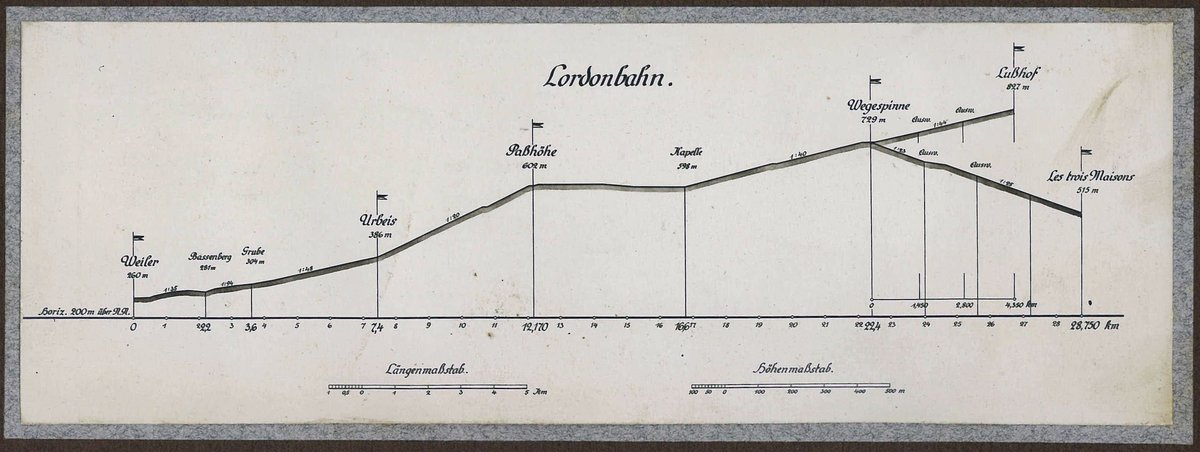
Profile of the Lordonbahn

The Lordonbahn light railway network consisted of a 27 kilometres (17 mi) long main line from Villé to Chaume de Lusse and three branches from Col d'Urbeis to Lubine, from Wegspinne to Trois Maisons and from Gare du Lusshoff-les-Yraux to the hamlet of La Pouxe.

The route with a gauge of 600 mm ran along the Val de Villé in Alsace to the 602 metres (1,975 ft) high Col de Urbeis, where it crossed the border to France. Behind the border a branch branched off to the west to Lubine. At Wegspinne (German for track spider) station, another branch line branched off to the east to Trois Maisons from the main line leading south to Lusshof station (Chaume de Lusse). The Lusshof was above today's Tunnel Maurice-Lemaire at a station of the Eberhardt aerial tramway to Klein Rumbach (Petit Rombach). From Lusshof, a branch line led around an 876 metres (2,874 ft) high mountain peak to the Terminale station at La Pouxe near Wisembach with another branch to the top station of a cable car at Les Yraux Fermes.

== Operation ==
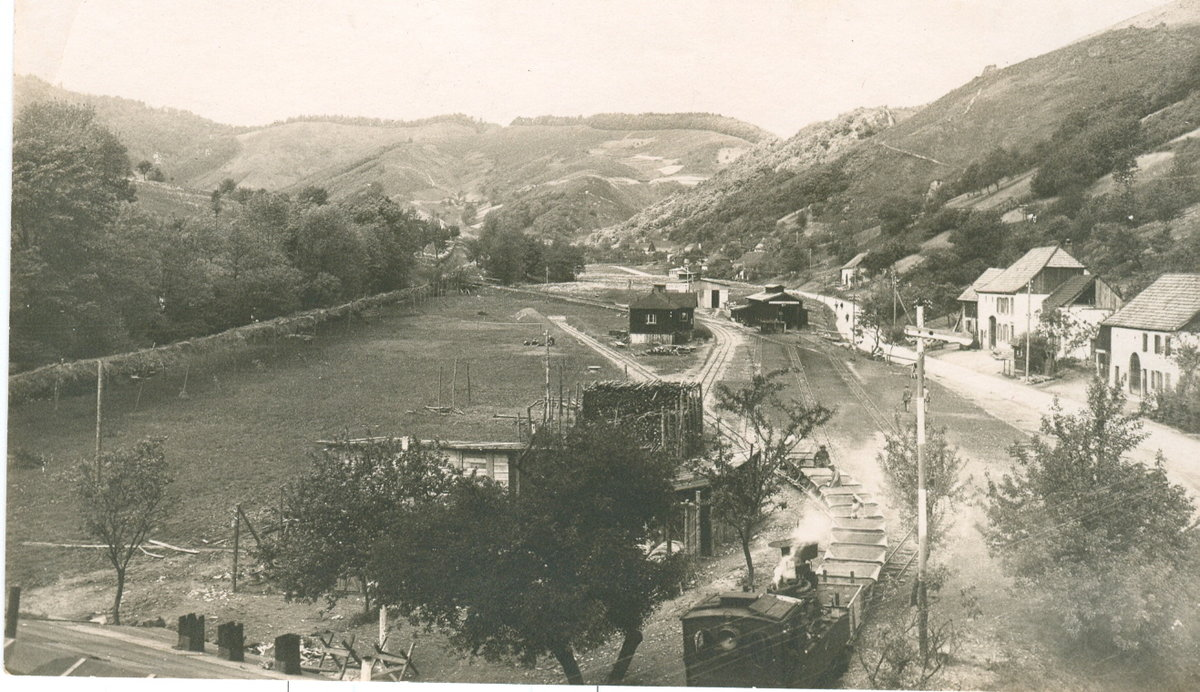
Urbeis tramway station, May/June 1918

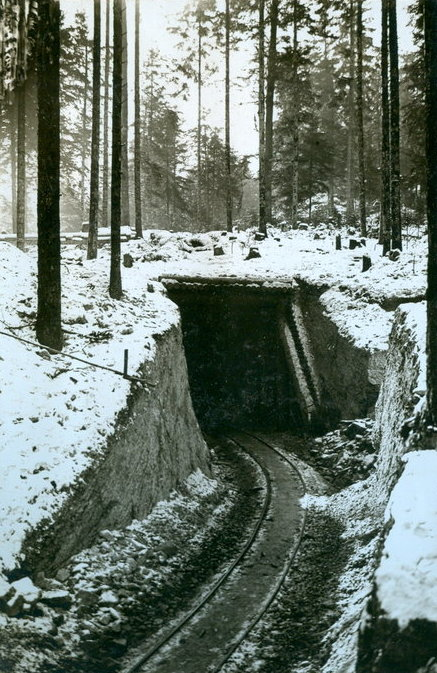
Tunnel at Passhöhe

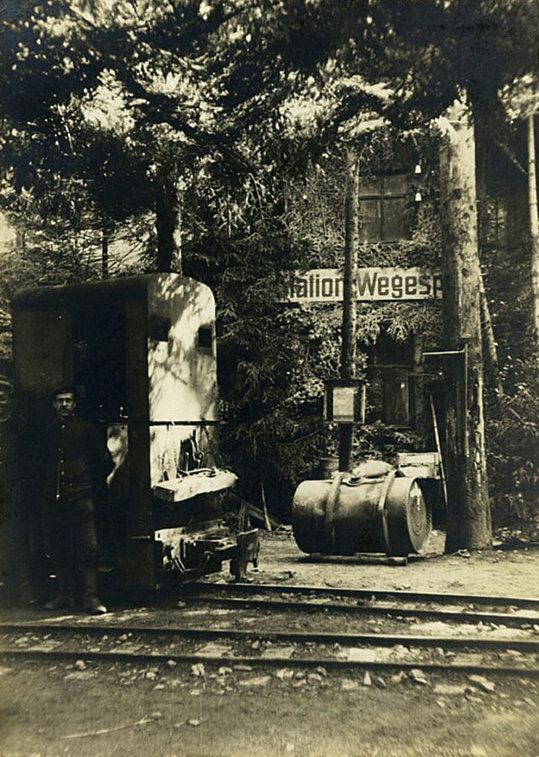
Wegspinne tramway station

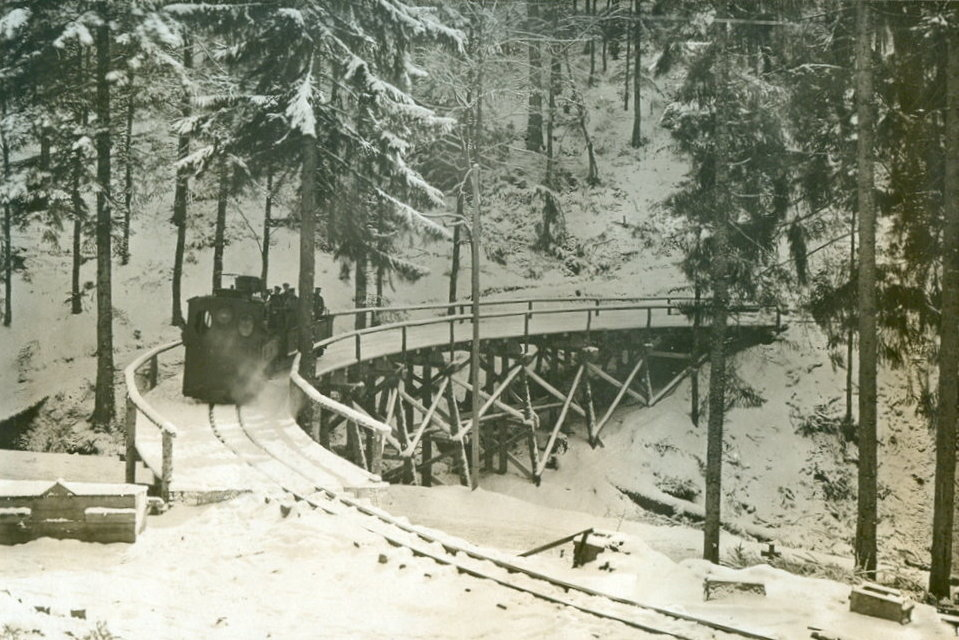
Bridge at km 16.7

On 31 December 1917 five military steam locomotives, eight benzene locomotives and 97 wagons were in use on the Lordonbahn, which were operated and maintained by 193 men. 77 of them belonged to the 24th Bavarian Brigade and 87 were soldiers from other military units. They were supported by 19 civilians and 10 prisoners of war from Russia and Romania. Every day, an average of 160 tons of weapons, ammunition and supplies were transported on 6 round trips with 32 wagons, as well as wounded soldiers in the opposite direction. In addition, a brand-new Borsig steam locomotive with five coupled wheel sets drove on the route (Borsig, 0-10-0, N° 10235/1917).
