= Joseph Bilger =

Joseph Théodore Bilger (1905–1975) was an Alsatian Catholic agrarian activist and autonomist politician during the late years of the French Third Republic.

== Early life and career ==
He was born in born September 27, 1905, in Seppois-le-Haut.

Joseph Bilger began his career as a journalist in Alsatian autonomist and clerical media under the Alsatia group. He was also a member of the Union populaire républicaine (UPR). At the age of 22, he founded a farmers' union in Sundgau, which later aligned with the Elsässischer Bauernbund (Union paysanne d'Alsace) which had been established in February 1924 as a reaction against the pro-government agricultural federation of Alsace-Lorraine.

== The Union Paysanne and the Front National du Travail ==
Bilger became the secretary-general of the Union paysanne d'Alsace in 1928 and led peasant protests in Alsace-Moselle during the 1930s. In 1934, Bilger transitioned the Bauernbund from a professional to a political organisation amidst a crisis affecting small farmers in Alsace and Moselle. In 1935, he founded the Front national du travail (FNT), integrating the Union paysanne. The FNT was anticommunist, antiliberal, antisemitic, and antiparliamentarian. The group adopted green shirts as uniforms, adorned with a Lorraine cross emblem.

Bilger unsuccessfully ran for election in 1936 in Guebwiller, coming fourth. During this time, his movement intensified its opposition to the Popular Front, organizing protests and resisting accusations of fascism or autonomy-seeking. However, his ties to both the antiparliamentary French right, particularly Henri Dorgeres who appropriated his idea of a greenshirt uniform, and the Nazi German regime became increasingly evident.

== Later life and legacy ==
Following the Second World War, Bilger faced accusations of collaboration with Nazi Germany. He was sentenced to ten years of forced labor and twenty years of indignité nationale in 1947. Released in the 1950s, he resumed political activity, advocating for a Christian corporatist state and supporting French Algeria.

He was involved with Henri Dorgères’ Défense paysanne and other agrarian movements. He also joined the right wing Mouvement populaire du 13-Mai.

Joseph Bilger had four children, one daughter Marie-Christine, and three sons, economist François Bilger, businessman Pierre Bilger and magistrate Philippe Bilger. Following his imprisonment and divorce, they lived with their mother, Suzanne Gillet.

He died on October 2, 1975, in Clichy.

== Sources ==
- Carrol, Alison (2018), The Return of Alsace to France, 1918–1939
- Robert-Diard, Pascale (July 21, 2008), "Les Bilger, fils d'une ambition", Le Monde
- Lerch, Dominique (2013), "Du journalisme au syndicalisme paysan, entre Alsace, Moselle et Algérie, un itinéraire d'extrême droite, proche du nazisme : Joseph Bilger (1905–1975)" (PDF), Annales de l'Est
- Passmore, Kevin (2013), "11 Apogee and Crisis (1928–1932)", The Right in France from the Third Republic to Vichy (online ed.), Oxford: Oxford Academic, doi:10.1093/acprof:oso/9780199658206.003.0004, ISBN 9780191745034
- Paxton, Robert O. (1997-09-26), French Peasant Fascism: Henry Dorgeres' Greenshirts and the Crises of French Agriculture, 1929–1939, Oxford University Press, USA, ISBN 978-0-19-535474-4
