= Bauernbund =

Bauernbund means "Peasants' League" in German. There were examples in:

- Bavaria - Bavarian Peasants' League
- Lower Austria
- The Elsässischer Bauernbund in Alsace, led by Joseph Bilger
- The Belgian Boerenbond
- The Hessische Bauernbund
- The Südtiroler Bauernbund
