= Poupart =

Poupart can refer to:

- Alfred Poupart (1876-1963), French archer who competed at the 1908 Summer Olympics in London
- Brigitte Poupart, Canadian actress and filmmaker
- Chaiyapol Julien Poupart (born 1990), Thai actor and model
- François Poupart (1661–1708) French physician, anatomist, entomologist, who described:
  - Poupart's ligament, another name for the inguinal ligament in anatomy
- Henri-Pierre Poupart or Henri-Pierre Poupard, renamed himself Henri Sauguet, (1901-1989), French composer
- Henri Poupart-Lafarge (born 1969), French business executive
- Jean Frédéric André Poupart de Neuflize (1850 – 1928), French banker and equestrian
- Roberte Ponsonby, Countess of Bessborough, née Poupart de Neuflize (1892–1979), French noblewoman
- Samuel Poupart, English owner of the land that became:
  - Shaftesbury Park Estate which is served by the rail junction
- Susan "Suzy" Poupart (1960–1990) victim in the Murder of Susan Poupart
