= Lionel-Max Chassin =

French Air Force general

Guillaume Jean Max Chassin, known as Lionel-Max Chassin (26 April 1902 – 16 August 1970), was a French Air Force general, resister, colonial activist and supporter of Catholic extreme-right-wing politics.

== Biography ==
He was born in Bordeaux to Suzanne Meriochaud and Max Chassin, a notary. He studied at the Collège de Blaye and the Lycée de Bordeaux. He joined the École navale [Naval School] in France in 1919, taking part in naval operations during the Rif War and obtaining an engineering diploma in 1921. He graduated first from the Aeronautics School at Rochefort (Charente-Maritime) and entered the Aeronavale [Naval Air Force] in 1926, also teaching a higher course in air navigation from 1927 as a young lieutenant and becoming a director there two years later. He was a keen rugby player and an excellent shot with a rifle.

In 1935, he joined the Air Force at the time of its creation and was one of the first to qualify from the Avignon-Puault parachuting school in 1936, where he became a captain. He became president of the Air Force shooting society and of the National Military Sports Council. Promoted to commander in 1938, he graduated from the École de guerre aérienne (Air Warfare School) in 1939. In 1940, he obtained a diploma from the Sciences Po (Free School of Political Science) and represented France on the strategic committee in London before being assigned in May to the cabinet of chief of staff of the Air Force. Two days after the Nazi-French Armistice of 22 June 1940, he flew to Algiers and was sent to Morocco. In September, he commanded group 1/32 on the Vichy-directed mission to bomb Gibraltar but his group's bombs were dropped in the sea by mistake. He was assigned to the military office of the secretary of state for aviation in Vichy but contemporaneously was a member of the Ronsard-Troine resistance network. Chassin piloted admiral François Darlan's plane to Algiers on 5 November 1942, three days before the Allied invasion. He actively participated in negotiations during the American landing and went to Morocco and Dakar to rally French forces to the Allies' effort. Made lieutenant-colonel in 1943, he was appointed director of military personnel of the air force.

He was promoted to colonel in 1944, brigadier-general in 1946 and major-general in 1949. He was deputy chief-of-staff of national defence (1946–1948), commanded the 3rd air region (1948–1951) and was commander of aviation in Indochina (1951–1953), where he succeeded general fr:André Hartemann. From 1953 to 1956, Chassin was commander-in-chief of the Territorial Air Defence in Versailles. He influenced prime minister Pierre Mendès France to commence the French military nuclear program in 1954. In 1956, he was made commander and coordinator of Allied Air Defence in Central Europe with NATO i.e. part of Supreme Headquarters Allied Powers Europe (SHAPE). He had been promoted to air force general in 1957. He wrote in a German military periodical that year that Germany should produce nuclear weapons. At the end of his term with SHAPE he benefited from permanent aircrew leave in April 1958.

=== Involvement in far-right politics ===
Chassin's particular Catholic views aligned with Jean Ousset's so-called Cité catholique, a mooted Catholic French state similar to Francoist Spain. Chassin was uncompromising in denigrating others, even Catholic critics, dismissing them as "communist", for example. In October 1954, in the Revue Militaire d’Information, he wrote of the “ideological role” of the army, its mission of “moral recovery” and guardianship of values.

He was a leader - nicknamed le grande B - of militant nationalist Henri Martin's Grande O plot (Martin was le grande V) along with general Paul Cherrière (le grande A) which ran from 1954 to 1958. The aim of the plot, after an uprising in Algeria and France - in which Chassin would seize the Saint-Étienne arms factory and take control of Lyon - was a Catholic, corporatist right-wing state inspired by Portugal's existing Estado Novo. In January 1957, he succeeded general Raoul Salan as head of the patronage committee of the Association des combattants de l’union française (ACUF) [Association of French Union Combatants]. Because of his involvement in he counter-revolutionary Opération Résurrection, his arrest was ordered under Pierre Pflimlin's brief prime ministership and he went underground. He tried to mobilise French-Algerian partisans in opposition to the Fourth Republic. In June 1958, he founded the Mouvement populaire du 13-Mai party, which initially supported the return of Charles de Gaulle; with anger and embarrassment at party differences, including ACUF members leaving, he resigned in September, passing control to Robert Martel.

He ran in the legislative elections of November 1958 in the 2nd constituency of Gironde against future prime minister Jacques Chaban-Delmas but was well beaten. He became interested in Georges Sauge's anti-communist Centre d'études supérieures de psychologie sociale (CESPS) [Centre for Advanced Studies in Social Psychology], which advocated defence of the "Christian West", attending and speaking at meetings in 1959. In January 1960, having tried to reach Algeria during the right-wing insurrection known as La semaine des barricades, he was arrested by the police but released shortly after. From 1961, his activism was cut short by serious illness but he continued as ACUF president until the beginning of 1966. That year, he co-signed an anti-communist declaration denouncing Viet Cong guerrilla aggression in South Vietnam.

=== Interest in ufology ===
Chassin was passionate about the subject of UFOs. In 1957, his dismissive opinions on the perceived threat to the West after the success of the Soviet Union's Sputnik satellite were widely reported. The following year, he provided the preface to Aimé Michel's work A propos des soucoupes volantes - about flying saucers - in which he wrote: "We can therefore affirm that there really are, in the sky around us, mysterious objects" adding that their identification as distinct from enemy missiles was essential given the US reaction to Sputnik. From 1964 to 1970, he chaired the fr:Groupe d'étude des phénomènes aériens (GEPA) [Study Group of Aerial Phenomena], a private ufological association of five hundred members.

=== Family and death ===
Chassin married Marcelle Momard and had three children, Max, Pierre - also an extreme-right-wing political activist who became an elected official of the Front National - and Claude. After Marcelle Chassin died, he remarried to Micheline Poggi-Chalais in 1961. Chassin died on 18 August 1970 in Marseille after a long illness.

== Published works ==
- Les conquérants de l’infini, Lajeunesse, 1945
- Histoire militaire de la Seconde Guerre mondiale, Payot, 1947
- Stratégie et bombe atomique, Lavauzelle, 1948
- Anthologie des classiques militaires français, Lavauzelle, 1950
- La conquête de la Chine par Mao Tse-Tung, Payot, 1952 (the English translation published as The Communist Conquest of China, Harvard University Press, 1965)
- L’ascension de Mao Tse-Tung, Payot 1953
- Aviation Indochine, Amiot-Dumont, 1954
- Bélisaire, généralissime byzantin, Payot, 1957

Prefaces

- Raymond Cauchetier, Ciel de guerre en Indochine (photographies), Lausanne, 1953
- Georges Hilaire Gallet, À l'assaut de l'espace, collection la Marche du monde, Paris, 1956
- Aimé Michel, Mystérieux objets célestes, Arthaud, 1958

From the 1930s, Chassin also wrote under a pseudonym - Guy Severac - in military journals.

== Awards ==
- Grand officier de la Légion d'honneur
- Croix de guerre 1939-1945
- Croix de guerre des théâtres d'opérations extérieures
- Médaille de la France libérée
- Commandeur des palmes académiques
- Médaille coloniale
- Médaille d'or de l’éducation physique
- Officer of the Order of the British Empire
- Grand officier de l'ordre du Vietnam
- Grand Croix du Nichan El-Anouar
