= Imerys =

French multinational company specializing in the production of industrial minerals

Imerys S.A.
- Type: Société Anonyme
- Traded as: Euronext: NK; CAC Mid 60 Component
- ISIN: FR0000120859
- Industry: Mining
- Incorporated: France
- Founded: 1880
- Headquarters: Paris, France
- Area served: Worldwide
- Key people: Alessandro Dazza (CEO); Patrick Kron (President, Chairman of the Board)
- Products: Specialty minerals
- Revenue: €3,794 million (2023)
- Operating income: €108 million (2023)
- Net income: €51 million (2023)
- Owner: Belgian Securities BV (53.91%); Blue Crest Holding SA (4.86%); Others (41.00%)
- Website: www.imerys.com

IMERYS S.A. is a French multinational company that specialises in the production and processing of industrial minerals. The main headquarters is located in Paris and are constituents of the CAC Mid 60 index.

Groupe Bruxelles Lambert is the largest shareholder of Imerys.

== History ==
The company was first founded in 1880, when the Rothschild family combined some of their metals and mining interests into the Spanish company Peñarroya. Over the next century it specialized in extracting and processing non-ferrous metals, becoming one of the world leaders in mining extraction.

After operating as a stand-alone company, in 1970 Peñarroya branched out and merged with the Société Le Nickel (now Eramet) and Mokta (now Société Mokta El Hadid) and created a new holding company called Imétal to manage the new business.

By the end of the 1990s, the company had become entirely focused on industrial mineral processing, following more acquisitions and a few divestments. In 1999, Imétal changed its name to Imerys. The company continued to expand its product lines, geographic reach, and markets.

In 2018, the Imerys group sought to simplify its structure through a transformation plan, reorganising the company around two segments, and grouping five newly created business areas.

In October 2022, Imerys announced the commencement of a mining operation for a lithium deposit at Allier from 2027. A press release issued by the group specified that this exploitation of lithium should last at least 25 years and will constitute one of the largest deposits of the mineral in Europe.

== Business organization and operations ==
Imerys has undergone numerous restructurings over the last decade with changing leadership.

=== Leadership ===
As of 17 February 2020 Alessandro Dazza assumed the role of Imerys’ Chief Executive Officer. Former Imerys CEOs are Patrick Kron, Gérard Buffière, Gilles Michel and Conrad Keijzer.

Since June 2019, Patrick Kron has served as chairman of the board of directors at Imerys.

=== Locations ===
Imerys’ headquarters are located in Paris. Imerys is based in over 40 countries and has 230 industrial sites. The group operates across the Americas and Europe Middle East Africa (EMEA) and Asia-Pacific (APAC).

The company's North American Operations are headquartered in Roswell, Georgia.

Other major offices are located in Kifisia, Greece, in Shanghai, China and in Nagpur, India.

== Corporate social responsibility ==
Imerys runs various initiatives in the field of corporate social responsibility (CSR). Since 2010, it has been part of Eco-Bos, a joint venture in Cornwall with Orascom Development to develop a series of sustainable communities on the site of former china clay mines, starting with the West Carclaze Garden Village, currently under construction.

In 2017, Imerys Minerals received the Natural England Award for Landscape-scale Restoration in the Biodiversity Category, recognition for a large-scale project recreating close to 2,000 acres of lowland heathland in Cornwall.

=== Science Based Targets ===
The Science-Based Targets Initiative (SBTi) has validated Imerys’ 2030 greenhouse gas (GHG) emission reduction targets in July 2023.” "Imerys commits to reducing absolute scope 1 and 2 GHG emissions by 42% by 2030 from a 2021 base year. Imerys also commits to reduce absolute scope 3 GHG emissions from purchased goods and services, capital goods, fuel and energy-related activities, upstream and downstream transportation and distribution, waste generated in operations, business travel, employee commuting, and investments 25% within the same timeframe.”

=== Carbon Disclosure Project (CDP) ===
In 2019, Imerys was recognized by the CDP (formerly the Carbon Disclosure Project) and received a score of B for the group's efforts on climate change. The group affirms this grade is higher than the European average and the mining industry average (both grade C).

=== French Museum of Natural History and Act4Nature ===
On 28 May 2018 Imerys signed a convention for collaboration, research and expertise with the UMS 2006 Patrimoine Naturel and other organizations, including the National Museum of Natural History, France, the French Agency for Biodiversity (now the French Office for Biodiversity) and the French National Centre for Scientific Research (CNRS). The three-year partnership of three years is meant to help Imerys structure a global plan for diversity preservation.

The convention centers around “the knowledge and conservation of biodiversity” and relies on four main pillars: site analysis and identification of best practices; sharing expertise, methodology, and tools; participating in and supporting innovation, and highlighting research findings, which includes raising awareness and informing personnel.

The UMS Patrimoine Naturel offers its scientific expertise, support, advice, and methodological tools to support Imerys in the development of an action plan and commitment project that is aligned with the objectives of the National Biodiversity Strategy (SNB) and Act4Nature. The aim of this program is to develop and deploy methodological tools to characterize and assess biodiversity on Imerys sites in France and abroad, aiming to ensure that biodiversity is taken into account during all phases of a mining project. In October 2020 the program was officially renewed, taking effect in June 2021 for another three years.

In 2018, Imerys also joined Act4Nature International, an initiative launched on 10 July 2018 by Entreprises pour l’environnement (EpE), the World Business Council for Sustainable Development (WBCSD) Global Network partner in France. In a public announcement, the group declared its plans to implement concrete measures to integrate and reinforce efforts to preserve biodiversity in their operations over the period 2020-2024.

== Controversies and criticisms ==
=== Imerys Talc America worker lockout ===
After Imerys Talc America in Three Forks, Montana unveiled plans to phase out union workers' retiree insurance, seniority, and overtime clauses and to alter work rules and classifications, Boilermakers Local D-239 union workers did not ratify a new contract. On 2 August 2018 Imerys informed union workers by letter that they would be locked out of the workplace and escorted the remaining employees off of the property. The mill's union president, Randy Tocci, stated that the company brought in employees from other sites around Montana to run the mill in Three Forks, crossing picket lines. Over August and September, multiple Montana elected officials and candidates visited the picket lines, such as Democratic Governor Steve Bullock, Senator Jon Tester, and US House candidate Kathleen Williams. On 9 August Montana Governor Steve Bullock stood with the unionized plant employees for more than an hour, offering his support and expressing hope that the parties would return to negotiations.

On 6 October 2018, in response to the lockout, Tester introduced a bill called Prohibiting Incentives for Corporations that Kickout Employees Tax Act, or PICKET Act (S. 3544 ), that would raise tax rates and eliminate tax breaks for corporations while they are engaged in labor lockouts. Deduction of wages and benefits for temporary workers during the lockout would also be prohibited under the Act, and certain tax credits for hiring replacement workers would be prevented. This bill has no co-sponsors and has not received a hearing in the Finance Committee during the 119th Congress.

On 31 October 2018, after three months of negotiations, union workers voted to approve a new three-year contract with Imerys, effectively ending the lockout and allowing workers to return to the plant. Randy Tocci said that “Imerys brought some different people to the table on Oct. 25, which helped move the negotiations forward.” About the contract, Tocci further said that it “protects seniority while also considering skills in applying for jobs and will continue to provide health benefits to retirees who leave the company through 2019. Workers will get a 3 percent increase in base pay, but their pensions will be frozen”.

=== Talc business ===
Through Imerys Talc America, Imerys led operations in talc mining and talc transformation for many years in Montana and Texas. These activities served local markets, as varied as paper & board, plastics, and cosmetics. As a talc supplier for Johnson & Johnson, the company was a co-defendant with Johnson & Johnson in mass tort litigation in the USA involving powder products that some consumers alleged to have contained asbestos and caused them to develop cancer. Imerys Talc America has always denied that its talc products contain asbestos and stands by the safety of its products. Faced with a growing number of complaints, on 13 February 2019 the North American Talc Subsidiaries of Imerys (Imerys Talc America, Imerys Talc Vermont, Imerys Talc Canada) filed bankruptcy under Chapter 11 of the United States Bankruptcy Code.

On 15 May 2020 Imerys came to an agreement with representatives of the current and future tort claimants to resolve their historic talc-related liabilities. As part of the plan, the North American Talc subsidiaries agreed to sell their assets and contribute the proceeds to a Trust to compensate claimants. That sale process was completed in November 2020, when the Court approved the sale of the North American talc business to Magris Resources, a Canadian mining group, for $223 million. The debtors are aiming to close the sale in early 2021. Under the plan, the trust would also receive all insurance and indemnities related to the talc liabilities in North America, as well as a cash contribution from the Imerys Group. This plan of reorganization is pending approval by the claimants and the Court.
