= Mouvement populaire du 13-Mai =

French political party

- President: Lionel-Max Chassin 1958
- President: Robert Martel 1958-1960
- Founded: June 1958
- Dissolved: January 1960
- Ideology: French colonialism French nationalism
- Political position: Far-right
- Religion: Roman Catholicism

The Mouvement populaire du 13-Mai (Popular Movement of 13 May), or the MP-13, was an extreme-right-wing French political party formed after the failure of the French Fourth Republic and the onset of the Fifth Republic.

== Development ==
It was founded in June 1958 by general Lionel-Max Chassin following the May 1958 crisis in France caused by events of 13 May in Algiers. Prior to this, different reactionary organisations of European colonists in Algeria had formed after the uprising of Algerian nationalists in 1955. Headquartered in Paris, the MP-13 was rooted in support for Christianity, the family, working traditions and rejection of the left, capitalism, freemasonry, and atheism. Its broad aims were to put an end to the actions of the Front de libération nationale (Algérie) (FLN) - the Algerian independence movement - a “refusal to give up French land” (i.e. colonial Algeria and the Sahara) and “the will to end an incompetent régime” (i.e. the administration of the French Fourth Republic). A Committee of Public Safety, with general Jacques Massu as its leader, had been formed to demand Charles de Gaulle's return but many supporters became anti-Gaullist. Leading supporters demonised Jews and Muslims, conflating their influence with capitalism and socialism respectively. No voting advice was given to members for de Gaulle's subsequent 1958 French constitutional referendum because opinions within the group were so polarised. The majority were led by Robert Martel - a counter-revolutionary French-Algerian vineyard owner nicknamed “the Chouan of Mitidja”. He wrote to Massu, announcing his resignation from the Safety Committee.

== Organisation ==
In the inaugural Congress of September 1958 - and by prior agreement - the MP-13 merged with the Union française nord-africaine (UFNA) which had been created in 1955 by Louis Boyer-Banse and later led by Martel; Boyer-Banse had been expelled from Algeria after a demonstration against its governor general, Robert Lacoste. Martel had effectively relied on Chassin's connexions in France. Chassin was the head of the patronage committee of the Association des combattants de l’union française (ACUF) which had amongst its members prominent military and right-wing elements. At the Congress, he became embarrassed and angry at the violent words of Martel. Some senior members of the ACUF - including army generals and commanders - left the party in disgust and Chassin resigned. Martel succeeded him as the MP-13 leader and a logo of a heart mounted by a cross (as that worn by the celebrated local Roman Catholic martyr Charles de Foucauld) was agreed upon. The movement had about 22 000 members, 17 000 in Algeria and 5 000 in France. The Congress was set at fifty members. Nine regional delegations were formed. On its national council of twenty members were former Alsatian regionalist and Nazi collaborator Joseph Bilger - general secretary and treasurer of the party - lawyer Roger Girard and militant nationalist Dr. Henri Martin, all former Cagoulards. Prominent members included Martel's right-hand man Maurice Crespin, neo-fascist white nationalist Dominique Venner, Vichyiste Pierre Sidos, resister and counter-espionage agent fr:Pierre de Villemarest and Paul Chevallet formerly of the fr:Union de défense des commerçants et artisans. There were different newspapers of the Movement including Salut public de l'Algérie française.

The MP-13 collapsed in 1960 after an arrest order was issued for Martel, Martin and Crespin because of their support of "la semaine des barricades" which began on 24 January of that year, leading to the Algerian War; they went into hiding. Venner and Sidos were imprisoned. Most of the Movement's members joined the Organisation de l'armée secrète the following year.
