= Franc-Paysannerie =

French agrarian organisation

The Franc-Paysannerie movement, founded by Edmond Jacquet in 1929, was a French agrarian organization which pioneered agrarian direct action through its "Combat Sections" and "Assault Sections", often disguised as social or recreational groups. Its militant tactics were seen as a forerunner of the more open Comités de défense paysanne.

== Sources ==
- Hubscher, Ronald; Lagrave, Rose-Marie (1993), "Unité et pluralisme dans le syndicalisme agricole français - Un faux débat", Annales ESC (in French)
- Ory, Pascal (1975), "Le dorgérisme, institution et discours d'une colère paysanne (1929-1939)", Revue d'Histoire Moderne et Contemporaine (in French), 22 (2): 168–190, doi:10.3406/rhmc.1975.2416
