= Tristan Mendès France =

French educator and writer

- Born: 7 March 1970 (age 56); Bordeaux, Aquitaine, France
- Education: Paris 1 Panthéon-Sorbonne University (Maîtrise)
- Occupations: Essayist, Columnist, Film director
- Relatives: Pierre Mendès France (grandfather)

Tristan Mendès France (French pronunciation: [tʁistɑ̃ mɑ̃dɛs fʁɑ̃s]; born 7 March 1970) is a French teacher, columnist, essayist, and film director who works in the digital field.

== Early life and education ==
Son of Joan and Michel Mendès France, and grandson of Pierre Mendès France, Tristan Mendès France was born in 1970 in Bordeaux, Gironde.

In 1995, he obtained a master's degree in public law at the University of Paris 1, then went on to study political science at the Sorbonne, where he specialized in new communication technologies. He obtained a postgraduate degree in political science in 1996. He then began a thesis, which he did not finish, under the supervision of Lucien Sfez at Credap (Centre for Research and Studies on Administrative and Political Decision), which was hosted by the University of Paris I until its closure.

== Activism ==
In his youth, he was an activist in Ras l'Front, a far-left association created in the 1990s. While working as a parliamentary assistant for socialist senator Michel Dreyfus-Schmidt, Mendès France pushed him to call on the Minister of the Interior, Jean-Pierre Chevènement, to expel the traditionalist Catholic movement of the Priestly Fraternity of Saint Pius X from the church of Saint-Nicolas-du-Chardonnet in Paris, without success.

He was a director of the association Together Against the Death Penalty until 2007 and is a sponsor of the Anticor association, founded by magistrate Éric Halphen, whose aim is to "fight corruption and restore ethics in politics".

A member of the scientific committee of the journal ProChoix, he has been an abortion rights activist since 1998. He is a director of the Institut Pierre-Mendès-France, of which he was also secretary general until March 2017.

== Professional career ==
He was the parliamentary assistant to the Socialist senator Michel Dreyfus-Schmidt from 1998 to 2008.

Since the end of 2008, he has been a lecturer at the École des hautes études en sciences de l'information et de la communication - Celsa, where he teaches courses in Master 1 and 2 on new digital cultures. He has been an associate lecturer at the University of Paris-Cité in Master 1 since September 2018. He has also taught at the Sorbonne-Nouvelle on the same theme since 2015, and has delivered "web2" training courses at the École des métiers de l'information in Paris since 2009.

== Media activity ==
=== Radio ===
From 1996 to 2001, he participated in a series of radio programs on politics and history on RCJ and was a columnist for TOC magazine. He was also an occasional columnist on France Culture in the show Place de la toile from 2008 to 2009, and has been one on France Inter in the show Instant M since 2016 . On 4 December 2020, he became a columnist for the 7/9 of France Inter on Fridays ("Antidote" section).

=== Web ===
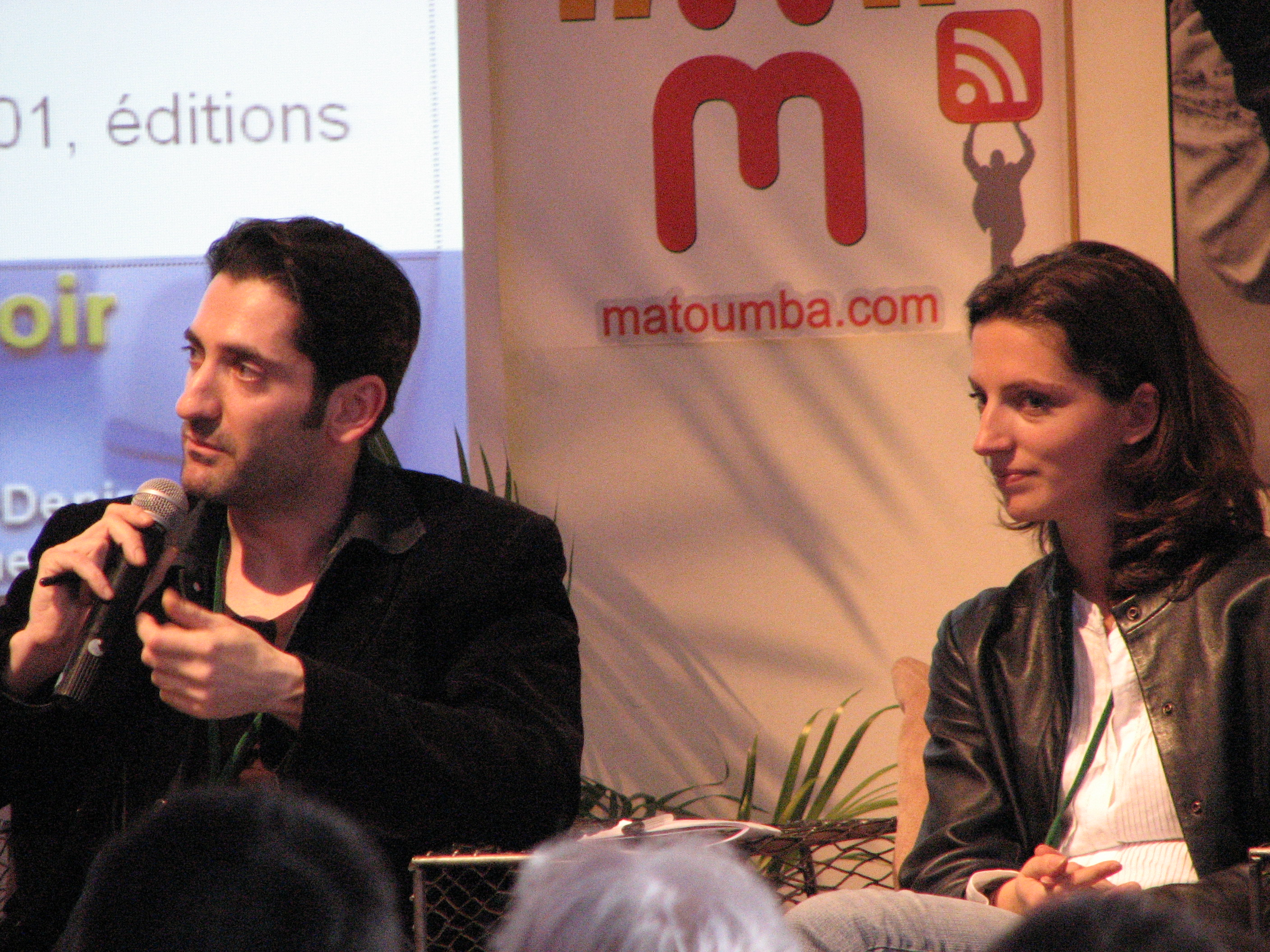
Tristan Mendès France and Quitterie Delmas during the first meetings of the ^{5th} power organized by AgoraVox at "L'Usine", in Saint-Denis on 24 March 2007.

Beginning in 2006, he developed, with Alban Fischer, a participatory video-blog report on subjects such as the genocide by the Khmer Rouge in Cambodia, the Armenian genocide in Turkey and, in May 2007, the question of refugees from Darfur, in partnership with the National Audiovisual Institute (INA). This led them to make A Day in Gaga: Darfur Refugee Camp, a documentary produced by INA. In 2007, for this blogtrotters initiative, they were awarded the Michel Colonna d'Istria prize by the Groupement des éditeurs de services en ligne (Geste), and they were finalists in the Online Journalism Awards 2008.

In 2011, he launched a satirical web-documentary about the Burmese dictatorship, Happy World, with Cinquième étage production.

In 2019, he launched the "Stop Hate Money" project, the objective of which is to "hold accountable financial actors and intermediaries who facilitate (sometimes unknowingly) the spread of hate speech online".

== Works ==
=== Books ===
- Mendès France, Tristan; Prazan, Michaël (1998). Une tradition de la haine: figures autour de l'extrême-droite (in French). Paris-Méditerranée. ISBN 978-2-84272-054-4.
- Mendès France, Tristan; Prazan, Michaël (2001). La maladie no 9: Récit historique, d'après le Journal officiel du 3 décembre 1920. Paris: Berg international. ISBN 2-911289-28-5.
- Mendès France, Tristan (2002). Dr la mort (in French). Lausanne-Paris: Favre. ISBN 978-2-8289-0682-5.
- Mendès France, Tristan (2003). Gueule d'Ange (in French). Éditions Favre SA. ISBN 978-2-8289-0723-5.
- Mendès France, Tristan; Leeds, Quintin (2021). Homo Graphicus. Paris: CNRS Éditions. ISBN 978-2-271-13901-6.

=== Documentaries ===
- Happy World: Burma, the Dictatorship of the Absurd, Planète, 2011 Orson-Welles Award at the California Film Awards
- A Day in Gaga, Darfur Refugee Camp, INA, 2007
- Docteur la mort, (film directed by Jean-Pierre Prévost on an investigation by Tristan Mendès France, a documentary about the South African doctor Wouter Basson) broadcast on France 3 on Thursday, May 31, 2001.
- Disease Number 9, The Fifth, 2000
