= List of senators of Eure =

Location of Eure in France

Following is a list of senators of Eure, people who have represented the department of Eure in the Senate of France.

== Third Republic ==
Senators for Eure under the French Third Republic were:

- Camille Clément de La Roncière-Le Noury (1876–1881)
- Albert, 4th duc de Broglie (1876–1885)
- Jean-Louis Lepouzé (1882)
- Alphonse Lecointe (1882–1890)
- Charles d'Osmoy (1885–1894)
- Victor Milliard (1890–1921)
- Anatole Guindey (1891–1898)
- Albert Parissot (1895–1911)
- Jules Thorel (1898–1906)
- Léon Monnier (1907–1923)
- Maurice Hervey (1912–1936)
- Abel Lefèvre (1921–1939)
- Ernest Neuville (1930–1939)
- Prosper Josse (1924–1930) then (1939–1945)
- André Join-Lambert (1937–1945)
- Léon Lauvray (1939–1945)

== Fourth Republic ==
Senators for Eure under the French Fourth Republic were:

- René Cardin (1946–1948)
- Georges Chauvin (1946–1948)
- Georges Bernard (1948–1957)
- Raymond Laillet (Montullé) (1948–1959)
- Jean Brajeux (1957–1959)

== Fifth Republic ==
Senators for Eure under the French Fifth Republic:

In office	Name	Group	Notes
1959–1962	Jean Brajeux	Républicains et Indépendants	
1959–1989	Modeste Legouez	Union des Républicains et des Indépendants	Died in office 30 January 1989
1962–1981	Gustave Héon	Gauche Démocratique	Died in office 29 September 1981
1980–1983	René Tomasini	Rassemblement pour la République	Died in office 5 May 1983
1981–1998	Henri Collard	Rassemblement Démocratique et Social Européen	Replaced Gustave Héon on 30 September 1981
1983–1998	Alain Pluchet	Rassemblement pour la République	Replaced René Tomasini on 6 May 1983
1989	Jean Guénier	Union Centriste	Replaced Modeste Legouez on 31 January 1989
1998–present	Ladislas Poniatowski	Les Républicains	
1998–2008	Jean-Luc Miraux	Union pour un Mouvement Populaire	
1989–2014	Joël Bourdin	Union pour un Mouvement Populaire	
2008–present	Hervé Maurey	Union Centriste	
2014–present	Nicole Duranton	Les Républicains	

== Sources ==
- Liste des anciens sénateurs de la IIIème République par circonscription (in French), Sénat de France
- Liste des anciens sénateurs de la IVème République par circonscription (in French), Sénat de France
- Liste des anciens sénateurs de la Vème République par circonscription (in French), Sénat de France
- Liste par département – Eure (in French), Sénat de France
