= Maurice Lemaire =

French politician

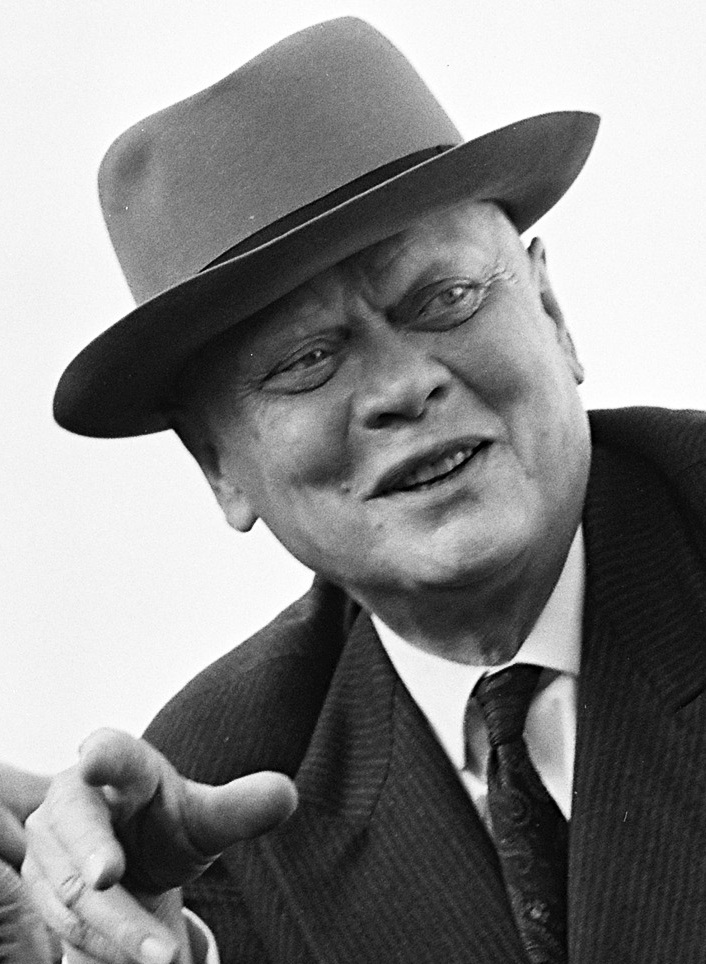
Maurice Lemaire in 1964

Maurice Lemaire (French pronunciation: [mɔʁis ləmɛʁ]) was a French Gaullist politician, born on 25 May 1895 at Gerbépal in the Vosges region: he died in Paris on 29 January 1979.

Lemaire’s background was as a railway engineer. He was the Director General of the SNCF following the liberation of France from German occupation. He was bald from an early age, and thereby acquired the nickname "Saint-Pierre-du-Gros-Caillou".

He represented the Vosges department in the National Assembly between 1951 and 1978. He occupied various senior regional political posts between 1947 and 1977, throughout which period Lemaire also served as the mayor of Colroy-la-Grande. He was also Representative of France in the European Parliament from 1951 to 1955.

Nationally he achieved ministerial office under three of the Fourth Republic prime ministers as follows:

- Minister for Housing and Reconstruction under Joseph Laniel between 1953 and 1954.
- Minister for Housing and Reconstruction under Pierre Mendès France between 1954 and 1955 (with a break between August and November 1954).
- Secretary of State for Trade and Industry under Guy Mollet between 1956 and 1957.

During his political career, Maurice Lemaire promoted the modernization of the tunnel which carries his name.
