= Seppois-le-Bas =

Commune in Grand Est, France

- Commune
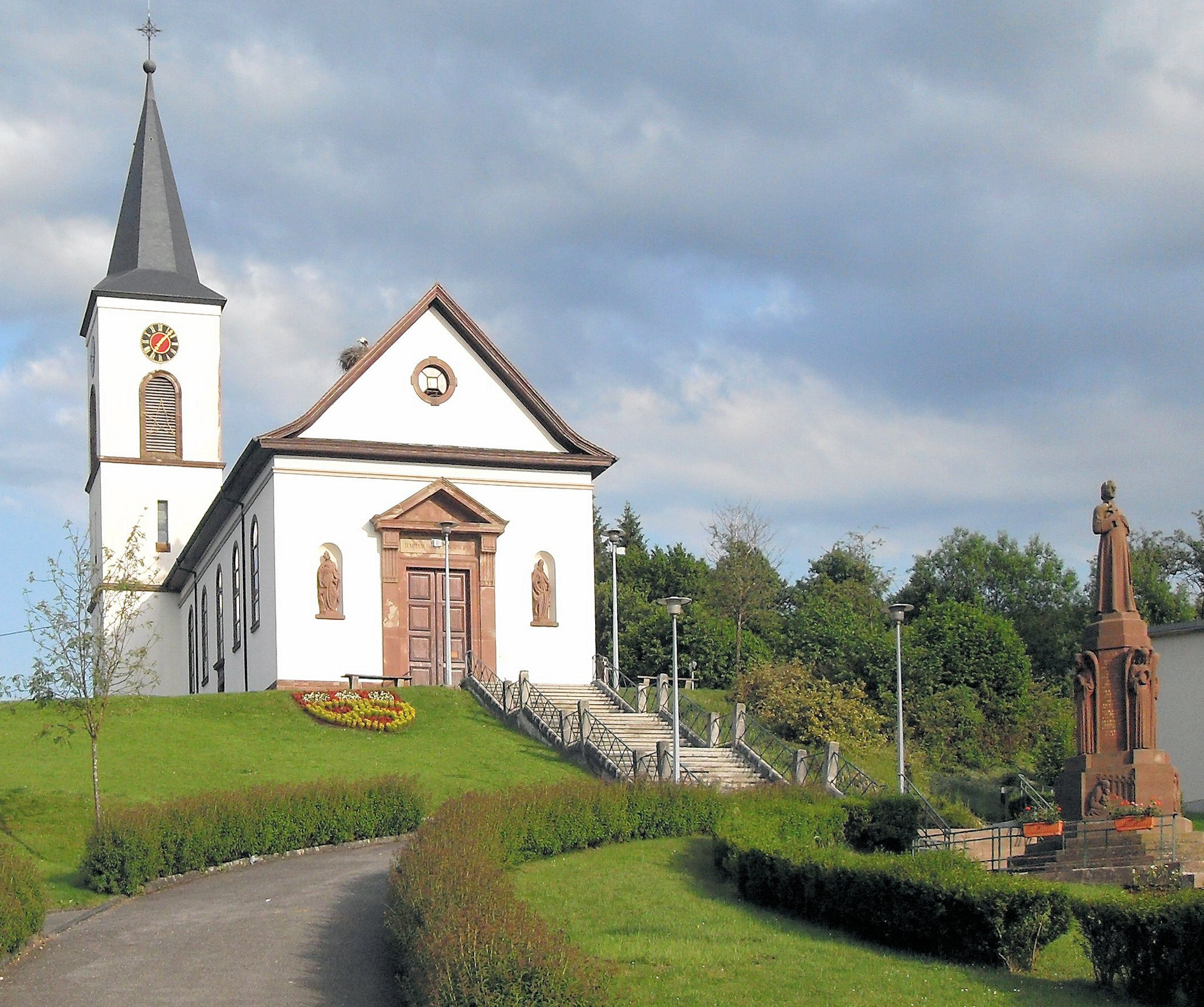
- The church in Seppois-le-Bas

- Coat of arms
- Location of Seppois-le-Bas
- Location within France Location within Grand Est
- Coordinates: 47°32′13″N 7°10′31″E
- Country: France
- Region: Grand Est
- Department: Haut-Rhin
- Arrondissement: Altkirch
- Canton: Masevaux-Niederbruck

Government
  - Mayor (2020–2026): Maurice Barnabe
- Area^{1}: 6.73 km^{2} (2.60 sq mi)
- Elevation: 385 m (1,263 ft)
- Highest elevation: 440 m (1,440 ft)
- Lowest elevation: 365 m (1,198 ft)
- Population (2023): 1,443
  - Density: 214/km^{2} (555/sq mi)
- Time zone: UTC+01:00 (CET)
  - Summer (DST): UTC+02:00 (CEST)
- INSEE/Postal code: 68305 /68580
- ^{1} French Land Register data, which excludes lakes, ponds, glaciers > 1 km^{2} (0.386 sq mi or 247 acres) and river estuaries.

Seppois-le-Bas (French pronunciation: [sɛpwa lə ba]; German: Niedersept; Alsatian: Needersept) is a commune in the Haut-Rhin department in Alsace in north-eastern France. The inhabitants of Seppois-le-Bas are called Bas-Seppoisiens and Bas-Seppoisiennes.

== Geography ==
Bordering the neighboring town of Seppois-le-Haut, it is located at the intersection of the Basel - Montbéliard (the old national road 463) and Porrentruy - Altkirch roads. The nearest major cities are Bâle 40 kilometers to the east, Mulhouse 30 kilometers to the north, Belfort 40 kilometers to the northwest, Montbéliard 35 km to the west and Delémont 35 km to the south. The Largue is the main river that crosses the town.

== History ==
While the village may have existed as far back as the time of the Celts, the oldest document referring to Saipoy dates from 1164. Another from 1264 and kept in the Lucelle collection confirms its existence. A text dated 1302 reveals a distinction between Seppois-le-Bas (Septen inferioris) and Seppois-le-Haut.

In 1530, the religious authorities and the faithful of a parish comprising the two Seppois, Luffendorf and part of Bisel, signed a charter of 32 decrees, which would be the first of its kind on Alsatian territory.

It is also around this date that the marriage of Marie de Hagenbach and Jean Eusèbe de Breitenlandenberg was celebrated. Their descendants lived in a manor in the village until 1818.

During the Thirty Years' War, the Swedes ravaged the country and in 1633, only one house in the village remained standing.

In 1789, the Lord of Seppois represented the nobility of Southern Alsace at the Estates General in Versailles. At the end of July 1789, during the Great Fear, the peasants attacked the manor. During the Terror, Jean Bochelen, vicar of the village who celebrated masses in secret, was arrested and shot in Colmar in 17989.

In 1871, by the Treaty of Frankfurt, Alsace was ceded to the German Empire, with the exception of the southwestern part of the Haut-Rhin which became the Territoire de Belfort. Due to its bordering position with this new French department, Seppois-le-Bas became a border village and hosted a customs post.

At the beginning of the 20th century, Seppois-le-Bas benefited from the effects of the economic growth of the time. Four annual fairs were set up and a market was established every Wednesday; both have had some success. Although farmers remain largely in the majority, the village also has four restaurants, three carpenters, two bakers, two wheelwrights, two shoemakers, two grocers, two tailors, one butcher, one farrier, one clog maker, one saddler and one cooper. as well as a forge, a mill and a watch case manufacturing unit.

A small Jewish community, essentially commercial, established itself and had its own synagogue. This was destroyed during the First World War and will never be rebuilt. Nowadays, the only vestiges of this community are a Rue des Juifs close to their old place of worship and former cemetery.

A Dannemarie-Pfetterhouse railway line passing through the village was built in 1908 and inaugurated in 1910. This line will continue to operate until 1968, then abandoned. Most of its route was converted into a cycling track in the 1990s.

The village experienced unrest and uncertainty as a result of the First World War: on August 23, 1914 the German army occupied the locality in the morning and the French in the afternoon. On September 3, dragoons from Belfort invaded the village and took behind their lines all the able-bodied men they could still find and who were between the ages of twenty and thirty-two. On September 17, it was the turn of the Germans to come and proceed in the same way.

In October 1914, the front stabilized a few kilometers from the village, which became a cantonment for the French army, with the church tower serving as a watchtower. However, this new status meant that Seppois-le-Bas suffered numerous bombardments until the end of the war.

On January 1, 1915, a ceremony marked the return of the locality to France. But faced with the intensification of the shelling, the civilian population was evacuated at the end of January 1916 and did not return until the spring of 1919 to a village transformed into a field of ruins. These events earned the village the Croix de Guerre of 1914-1918 (Official Journal of November 6, 1921).

During the Second World War, Seppois, like the rest of Alsace, was again annexed to the German Reich, and returned to its status as a border post. Due to its proximity to Switzerland, the village then welcomed several smugglers. However, the village's participation in war came to an end on November 19, 1944, when the Colonial Infantry Regiment of Morocco, part of the 1st Army of General de Lattre de Tassigny, made Seppois-le-Bas the first liberated village in Alsace.
