= Robert Martel =

French-Algerian colonialist politician

Robert Martel (5 March 1921 - 21 December 1997), nicknamed "the Chouan of Mitidja", was a French-Algerian farmer, counter-revolutionary French nationalist, founder member of the Union Française Nord-Africaine (UFNA) then leader of the extreme-right-wing political party the Mouvement populaire du 13-Mai (MP-13) following the coup d'état of 13 May 1958.

Martel was born in Algiers. His family came from Brittany. He owned 300 hectares of vineyards in the Mitidja plain, in Chebli. He was known as an ultra, a monarchist, a passionate colonialist and Catholic, with nostalgia for the Vichy régime. A member of the poujadiste UDCA shopkeepers' union, in 1954 he joined the fr:Groupe des sept (Group of Seven), a secret anti-independence alliance formed during the Algerian War between leaders of counter-revolutionary groups, poujadist personalities and revolutionary theorists. They infiltrated Gaullist activist fr:Léon Delbecque's 'Vigilance Committee' with the aim of overthrowing the régime of the French Fourth Republic and placing power in the hands of the army under general Raoul Salan. Martel was also the leader of the Union française nord-africaine (French North-African Union) (UFNA).

He was one of the main organizers of the coup d'état: Opération Résurrection commenced with deputy Pierre Lagaillarde ramming the gate of the government building with a lorry before Martel and his supporters took over the building. The next day, Martel tried to have general Salan declared in charge but Delbecque persuaded Salan to finish his speech to the crowd with "Vive de Gaulle!" ("Long live de Gaulle!"). Despite this setback, Martel continued to protest against Gaullism. The new MP-13 party was formed in June by Lionel-Max Chassin. Martel became a member of the 'Safety Committee' of general Jacques Massu, who had temporary command over civil and military matters in Algeria, with Salan as chair. However, Martel then merged UFNA with MP-13 and took over the latter's leadership in September 1958 while tendering his resignation to Massu from his Committee.

Martel took part in "La semaine des barricades", a week of protests in Algiers from January 24, 1960, with about 20 000 demonstrators and reservists. He declared, "With Deputy Pierre Lagaillarde, Maurice Crespin and farmers from the Mitidjia Plain, we are entrenched in the university. We will hold out till the end." The protests led to significantly increased fighting in the Algerian War with the formation of the Organisation armée secrète (OAS), an underground dissident paramilitary terrorist force of which Martel became a leader of the Constantinois district. An arrest order was issued for him and others and he went into hiding. In March 1961, he was sentenced to five years' prison in absentia for his part in the barricades. After three years, he was arrested in western France on January 21, 1963, and sentenced to a further year for his protest and eighteen months for plotting against the state. His former alliances had not lasted and he claimed to disavow OAS methods. He was released in 1968, following that year's amnesty law. He retired to Poitiers. He died in Bain-de-Bretagne in 1997.
