= Abel Lauvray =

French painter

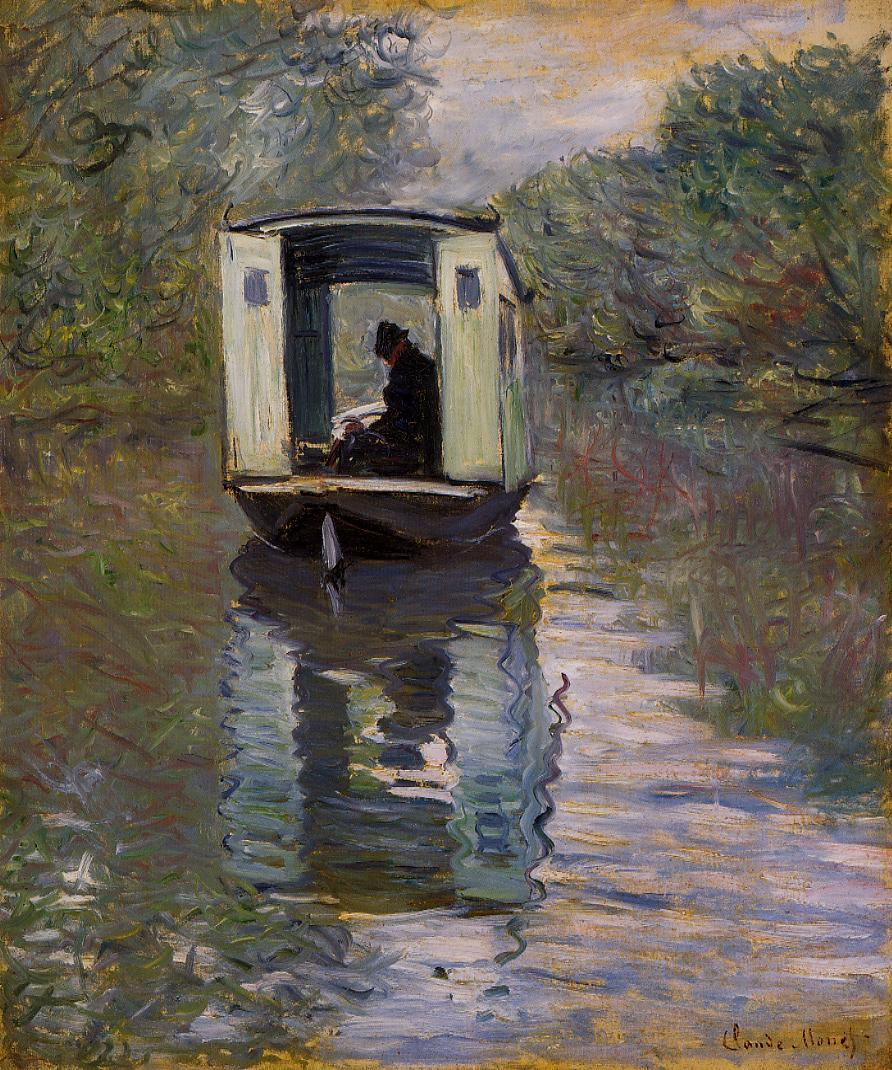
Claude Monet, Le Bateau atelier (1876), Philadelphia, Barnes Foundation.

Abel Lauvray (21 November 1870 – 19 December 1950) was a French Post-Impressionist painter.

== Biography ==
Born in Rennes and attached to the Post-Impressionism movement, Lauvray was a painter of landscapes and portraits. Coming from a wealthy family of notaries, he met Claude Monet for the first time around 1880, then settled about thirty metres from the family home in Vétheuil. He quickly became friend with the painter who, ruined, was helped by the Lauvray family. When Monet returned to Vétheuil in 1893, Abel Lauvray accompanied the painter on the Seine on his workboat, which he later handed over to him. He married Jeanne Lejard on 3 February 1908 who gave birth to his only child, Geneviève, in 1913.

After studying law, Lauvray decided to enrol in the Fernand Cormon's workshop in Paris and, on the advice of Claude Monet, to paint by himself. Following Monet's advice, without copying it, he produced about 1,500 paintings during the 60 years of his career. One-third of these canvases were destroyed during the fire of his workshop in Mantes-la-Jolie at the time of the events related to the French Liberation during World War II. His work was notably revealed to the public during his first posthumous exhibitions in 1963, then during the exhibition organized in 1970 at the Yves Jaubert gallery in Paris for the centenary of his death.

Following the tradition of Post-Impressionism and strongly marked by his admiration for Claude Monet, Lauvray excels at restoring the soft lights of the surrounding landscapes, which he represents with great delicacy. While most of his work paints the banks of the Seine from Vétheuil to Mantes-la-Jolie, he also illustrates his frequent passages in Touraine and Villeneuve-lès-Avignon, as well as his travels in Normandy, Antibes, the Somme (French department), Venice or Greece.

Abel Lauvray died in Vétheuil on 19 December 1950.
