= Seppois-le-Haut =

Commune in Grand Est, France

- Commune
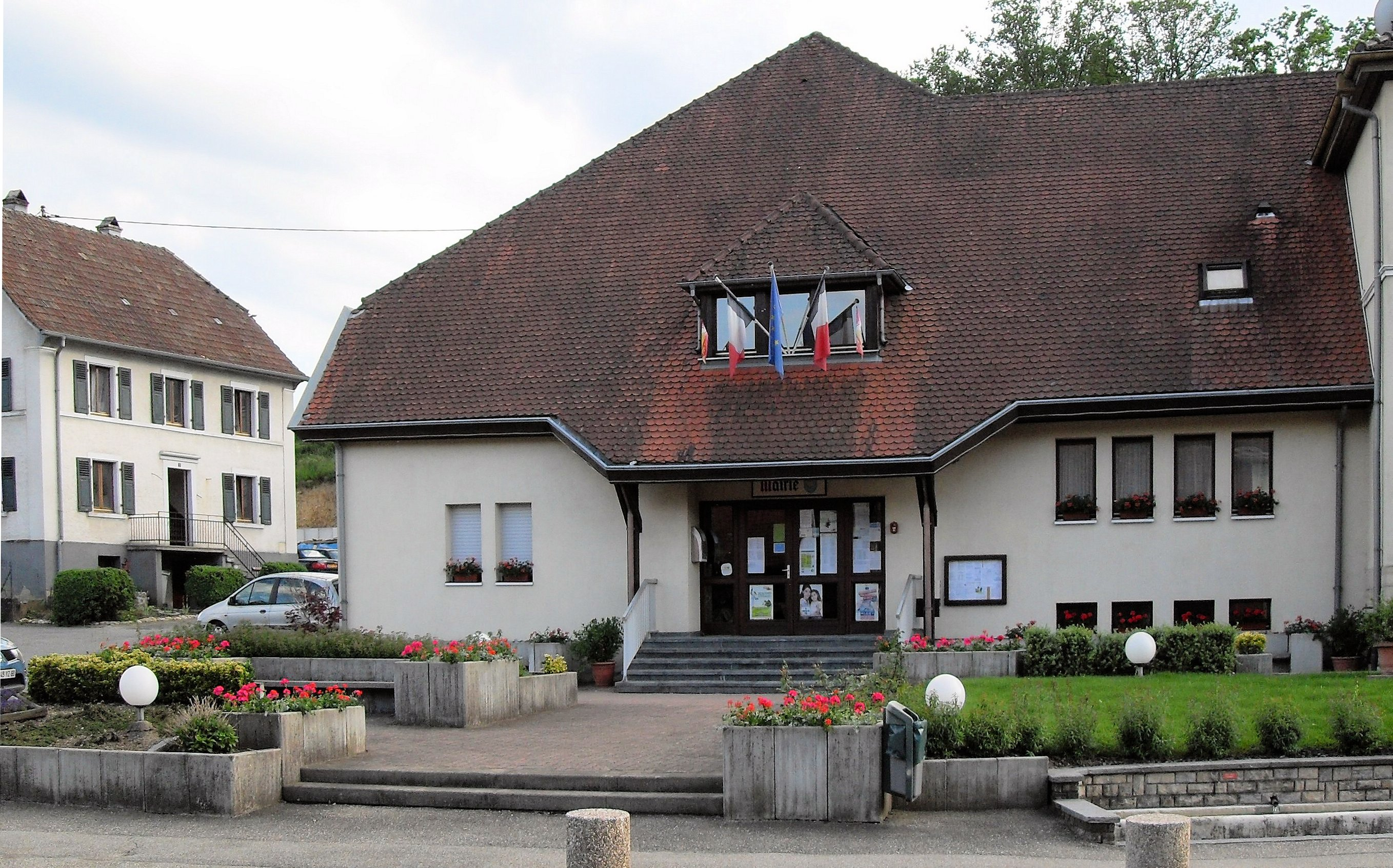
- The town hall in Seppois-le-Haut

- Coat of arms
- Location of Seppois-le-Haut
- Location within France Location within Grand Est
- Coordinates: 47°32′02″N 7°11′04″E
- Country: France
- Region: Grand Est
- Department: Haut-Rhin
- Arrondissement: Altkirch
- Canton: Masevaux-Niederbruck

Government
  - Mayor (2020–2026): Fabien Ulmann
- Area^{1}: 6.27 km^{2} (2.42 sq mi)
- Elevation: 390 m (1,280 ft)
- Highest elevation: 432 m (1,417 ft)
- Lowest elevation: 379 m (1,243 ft)
- Population (2023): 505
  - Density: 80.5/km^{2} (209/sq mi)
- Time zone: UTC+01:00 (CET)
  - Summer (DST): UTC+02:00 (CEST)
- INSEE/Postal code: 68306 /68580
- ^{1} French Land Register data, which excludes lakes, ponds, glaciers > 1 km^{2} (0.386 sq mi or 247 acres) and river estuaries.

Seppois-le-Haut (French pronunciation: [sɛpwa lə o]; German: Obersept; Alsatian: Owersept) is a commune in the Haut-Rhin department and, since January 1, 2021, in the territory of the European Community of Alsace, in the Grand Est region.

== Geography ==
The village is located in the extreme southwest of Sundgau. It is at the confluence of the Largue, which crosses it, and the Grumbach. It is more or less equidistant from Mulhouse to the north, Belfort to the southwest and Basel to the east. It borders the neighboring village of Seppois-le-Bas.

== History ==
Seppois-le-Bas was hard hit during the conflicts of the First World War. The commune was decorated on November 2, 1921 with the Croix de Guerre 1914-1918.

== Economy ==
Despite its location near the “automotive of the future” competitiveness cluster (Mulhouse, Belfort, Sochaux-Montbéliard) and the Basel site in full economic expansion, the village remains largely rural.

== Demography ==
In 2019, the town had 507 inhabitants, an increase of 4.75% compared to 2013 (Haut-Rhin: +1.1%, France excluding Mayotte: +2.17%).

== Places and monuments ==
The Sainte-Croix chapel, erected in the middle of the village. Mentioned for the first time in 1620, it is certainly older because it has a choir in Gothic architecture with a semicircular vault; converted into a socio-cultural center, exhibitions and conferences are held there regularly;

The Saint-Hubert church was destroyed during the First World War and rebuilt in 1928, replacing the original 1859 church. It contains sculptures and paintings, including stations of the cross, a communion bench, a high altar, paintings representing Saint Sebastian and Saint Roch, and an organ by Frédéric Haerpfer. Fountains are located along the main axis.

Memorials: The monument to the shots of Ballersdorf;

The felled Kreuzengarten lime tree, located in the garden of the old Sainte-Croix chapel, was several hundred years old.

== See also ==
- Communes of the Haut-Rhin department
