= Tunnel Maurice-Lemaire =

French tunnel

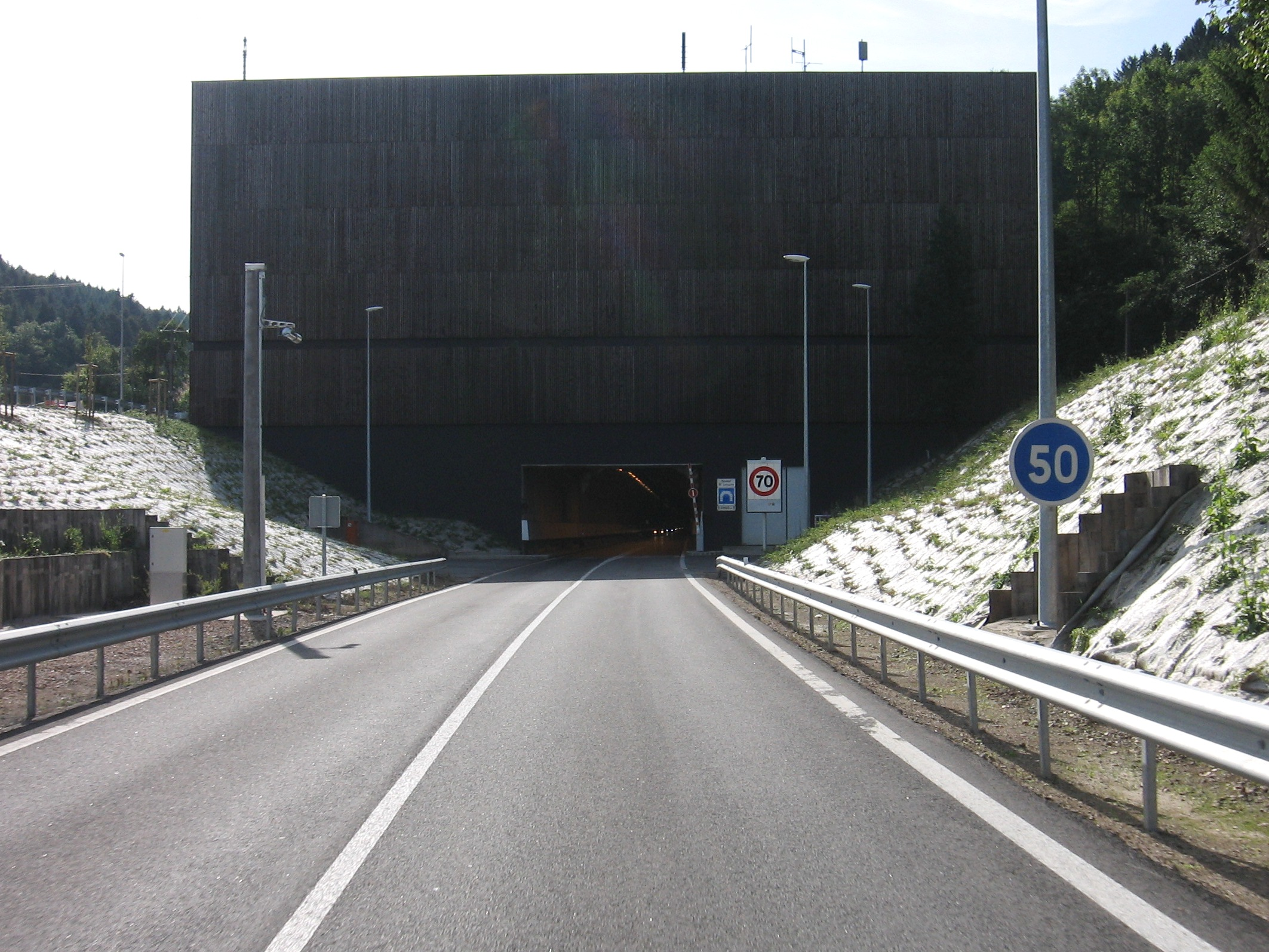
- Interactive map of Tunnel Maurice-Lemaire

Overview
- Route: Route nationale 159 (France) from 48°15′13″N 7°11′37″E to 48°17′18″N 7°7′1″E
- Crosses: Vosges Mountains
- Start: Vosges
- End: Haut-Rhin

Operation
- Opened: 8 August 1937 (rail); 7 February 1976 (road)
- Closed: 2 June 1973 (rail)
- Operator: Autoroutes Paris-Rhin-Rhône
- Traffic: Automotive
- Character: Railway tunnel (1937-1976); Single carriageway road tunnel with service tunnel (since 1976)
- Toll: € 9.40 (2019)

Technical
- Length: 6,950 m
- No. of lanes: 2

The Tunnel Maurice-Lemaire, commonly known as the Tunnel de Sainte-Marie-aux-Mines is a former rail tunnel adapted to permit road traffic to drive between Sainte-Marie-aux-Mines (Haut-Rhin, Alsace) and Saint-Dié (Vosges, Lorraine), France, without needing to drive over the mountain pass. The tunnel is 6,950 m (7,600 yd) long, which till 2011 made it the longest road tunnel wholly within France. The tunnel owes its current name to Maurice Lemaire, a former Director General of the SNCF and a senior politician nationally and regionally during the third quarter of the twentieth century. Lemaire promoted the tunnel's modernisation.

== Origins ==
The tunnel was first mooted in 1866, but the annexation of Alsace-Lorraine by Germany put an end to the project until France recovered the 'lost provinces' in 1919. The tunnel was finally opened to rail traffic in August 1937. Although it was planned only to take a single rail track, the tunnel was wide enough to accommodate two lines: this was a common solution to ventilation issues that plagued French rail tunnels during the years when trains were steam powered. The extra width of the tunnel would prove particularly prescient in view of the tunnel's subsequent uses.

== 1940–1944 ==
In March 1944, the tunnel was adapted to accommodate a factory for the manufacture of aircraft components. The factory was staffed by prisoners from the concentration camp of Struthof who were also forced to build, at the eastern end of the tunnel, a camp where they were accommodated. Like the main camp, this camp was evacuated and the detainees removed to Dachau in September 1944.

== After the war ==
With the liberation of France, the tunnel returned to use as a rail tunnel. In June 1973 the rail connection was closed, however, and the SNCF sold the tunnel to the local authorities, reportedly for a good price which reflected the known plans for the future of the tunnel. Plans for conversion of the tunnel to road use had been under serious discussion at least since 1966. The route nationale 59 at that time was required to cross the Vosges Mountains via the Pass of Sainte-Marie-aux-Mines, which has an altitude of 772 meters. The area experiences a relatively high level of precipitation in the winter, and the pass frequently becomes barely passable. The Tunnel Maurice-Lemaire was accordingly converted for road use and opened as a toll tunnel in February 1976.

Used, on average, by 3,400 vehicles per day of which approximately 40% were trucks, the tunnel became an important economic artery for the Vosges department despite being closed to vehicles carrying flammable loads (which continued to use the Pass of Sainte-Marie-aux-Mines) on safety grounds.

== Closure for safety upgrade 2004–2008 ==
A major fire in the Mont Blanc Tunnel in March 1999 involved 39 fatalities and led to a general review of road tunnel safety in France. The Tunnel Maurice-Lemaire was closed, initially to trucks and subsequently, in April 2004, to all vehicles, in order that major safety improvements could be implemented. The principal development was the construction of a second parallel ‘safety tunnel’, having a diameter of six meters, bored through the mountain beside the main tunnel. The main tunnel is connected to the safety tunnel by means of a series of safety connections. The upgrade having been completed, the tunnel reopened to vehicles early in October 2008. In the meantime, alternative autoroute based routes were signed for long-distance traffic, while local drivers were obliged to renew their acquaintance with the Pass of Sainte-Marie-aux-Mines. Fortunately most motor vehicles used in France in the present decade are significantly more powerful than their 1970s predecessors.
