= Camille Bilger =

French politician

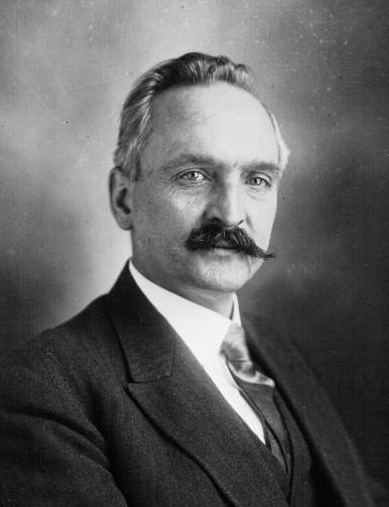
- Born: 17 October 1879; Mulhouse, France
- Died: 2 March 1947 (aged 67); Soultz, France
- Occupation: Politician

Camille Bilger (17 October 1879 – 2 March 1947) was a French politician. He served as a member of the Chamber of Deputies from 1919 to 1936, representing Haut-Rhin.
