= Elsässischer Bauernbund =

The Elsässischer Bauernbund (French: L'Union paysanne d'Alsace) was a farmers' organization in interwar Alsace.

The Union paysanne d'Alsace was established in February 1924 in Colmar by farmers from Haut-Rhin as a reaction against the pro-government agricultural federation of Alsace-Lorraine. Initially a professional organisation, it advocated a corporative structure, rejected Marxism and capitalism, and drew on social Christianity.

Joseph Bilger became its secretary-general in 1928, leading peasant protests in Alsace-Moselle during the 1930s. In 1934, Bilger transitioned the Bauernbund into politics amidst a crisis affecting small farmers in Alsace and Moselle.

It was strongest in the Bas-Rhin region and had strong links with the German Nazi regime. It had about 6,000 activists. Although they were Alsatian regionalists they had close links with the French nationalist Comités de défense paysanne, who did not organize in Alsace because of the Bauernbund's presence.

In 1935, the Union paysanne was integrated into the newly founded antiparliamentary Front national du travail (FNT).

== Sources ==
- Carrol, Alison (2018), "3", The Return of Alsace to France, 1918-1939 (online ed.), Oxford: Oxford Academic
- Goodfellow, Samuel Huston (2013), "Fascism as a Transnational Movement: The Case of Inter-War Alsace", Contemporary European History, Cambridge: Cambridge University Press
- Irvine, William D. (1999), Forum on Robert O. Paxton, French Peasant Fascism
- Ory, Pascal (1975), "Le dorgérisme, institution et discours d'une colère paysanne (1929-1939)", Revue d'Histoire Moderne et Contemporaine, 22 (2): 168–190, doi:10.3406/rhmc.1975.2416
- Passmore, Kevin (2013), "11 Apogee and Crisis (1928–1932)", The Right in France from the Third Republic to Vichy (online ed.), Oxford: Oxford Academic, doi:10.1093/acprof:oso/9780199658206.003.0004, ISBN 9780191745034
- Robert-Diard, Pascale (July 21, 2008). "Les Bilger, fils d'une ambition". Le Monde.
