= Grace Bilger =

American painter

Grace Olive Reeve Bilger (g.Bilger)
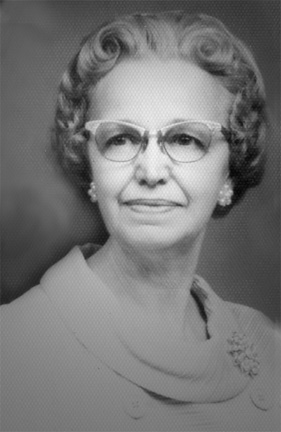
- Grace Reeve in 1960s, Kansas
- Born: June 25, 1907; Nebraska, U.S.
- Died: October 1, 2000 (aged 93); Sabetha, Kansas, U.S.

Grace Olive Reeve-Bilger (June 25, 1907 – October 1, 2000) was an American painter. Often signing the name of g.Bilger (and later g.Stansbury) to her work. Bilger is mainly noted for her watercolor paintings of buildings, landscapes and structures, many of historical significance throughout the mid-west, USA.

== Biography ==
Grace Reeve Bilger (g.Bilger and g. Stansbury) was a resident and artist in Olathe, Kansas from 1941 until 1999. She taught art at the Kansas School for the Deaf for 25 years. In addition to meeting her requirements as a teacher, she studied art with the following; Dong Kingman, Don Stone, Eliot O’Hara, Frank Szaaz, Richard Yip, Zalton Szabo, Tony Van Hasselt, and Asertio Pascolini. She traveled the world extensively and sketched in such places as Europe and Mexico as well as throughout the USA and Hawaii.

Bilger’s watercolor paintings have been reproduced along with her articles in the Ford Times, NEBRASKALand, and Kansas Magazine. She won a first prize in London, England for the design of a Christmas Card for the Heraldry Society. She also produced original historical murals which hung in the Johnson County Courthouse at Olathe . One of her works is in the permanent collection of the Sierra Museum of San Diego, California.

Bilger exhibited widely and her some of her works reside in collections in Europe, India, Philippines, and the U.S.A. She also had exhibited shows which include but is not limited to: the Kansas City area, Heritage, Discovery, Plaza, Ward Parkway, Oak Park, Crown Center, Prairie Village, Kansas, and Metcalf South.

In 1979 one of her watercolors was selected to be in the exhibition of Eastern Kansas Artists in the Rotunda of the Kansas State Capitol in Topeka, Kansas . She was a member of the International Society of Artists (Artists' International Association), the Greater Kansas City Art Association, and Tri-County Art League. "Grace Bilger" day was established June 25, 2007 in Olathe, Kansas to commemorate Olathe's 150th birthday and Grace's contributions artistically and historically to the city and county.

Grace Reeve Bilger is survived by her daughter Sarah, granddaughter Suzanna Reeves, two grandchildren, and four great-grandchildren.
