= Épreville-près-le-Neubourg =

- Commune
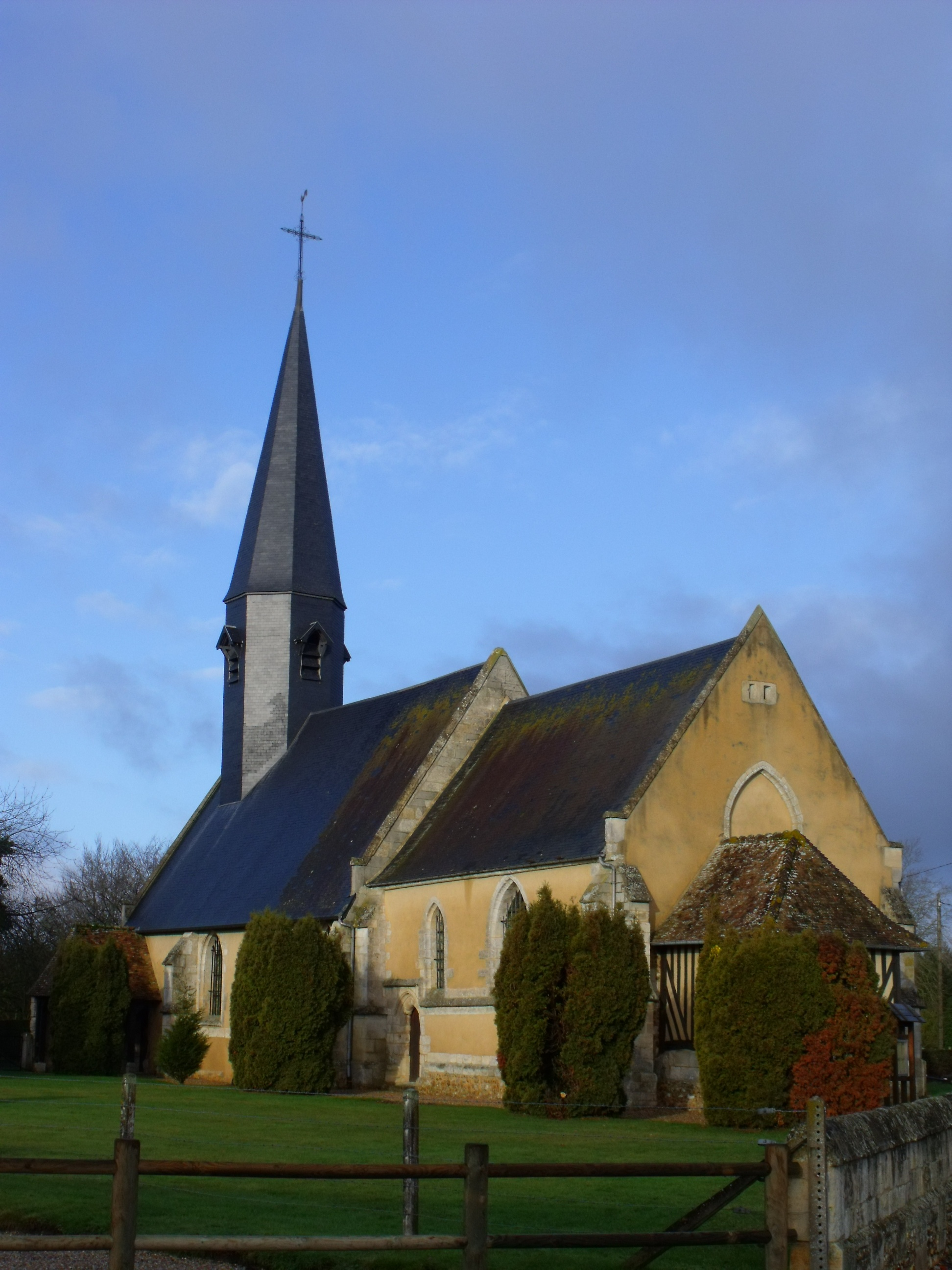
- The church in Épreville-près-le-Neubourg

- Coat of arms
- Location of Épreville-près-le-Neubourg
- Location within France Location within Normandy
- Coordinates: 49°08′12″N 0°52′53″E
- Country: France
- Region: Normandy
- Department: Eure
- Arrondissement: Bernay
- Canton: Le Neubourg

Government
  - Mayor (2022–2026): Patrick Eliot
- Area^{1}: 7.73 km^{2} (2.98 sq mi)
- Elevation: 139 m (456 ft)
- Highest elevation: 153 m (502 ft)
- Lowest elevation: 129 m (423 ft)
- Population (2023): 438
  - Density: 56.7/km^{2} (147/sq mi)
- Time zone: UTC+01:00 (CET)
  - Summer (DST): UTC+02:00 (CEST)
- INSEE/Postal code: 27224 /27110
- ^{1} French Land Register data, which excludes lakes, ponds, glaciers > 1 km^{2} (0.386 sq mi or 247 acres) and river estuaries.

Épreville-près-le-Neubourg (French pronunciation: [epʁəvil pʁɛ lə nøbuʁ], Épreville near Le Neubourg) is a commune in the Eure department in the Normandy region in northern France.

== Population ==
Historical population
Year	Pop.	±% p.a.
1968	279	—
1975	335	+2.65%
1982	332	−0.13%
1990	349	+0.63%
1999	361	+0.38%
2007	431	+2.24%
2012	508	+3.34%
2017	471	−1.50%
2023	438	−1.20%
Source: INSEE

== See also ==
- Communes of the Eure department
