= Assurances sociales =

History of French social insurance

Assurances Sociales
- Established: c. 19th century
- Type: Social Insurance Program
- Purpose: Protection against social risks, including illness, unemployment, old age, and family responsibilities
- Region served: France

Assurances sociales referred to the French social insurance framework to address social risks such as illness, unemployment, disability, old age, and family responsibilities. Its evolution reflects the broader history of social protection systems and the interplay between private initiative, public intervention, and collective solidarity. The current system is known as Sécurité sociale or Sécu.

== History ==
=== Origins ===
The roots of assurances sociales trace back to the Middle Ages, where certain guilds organized mutual aid among members. This was dismantled during the French Revolution by the 1791 Allarde decree, which abolished guilds, leaving workers without institutionalized social protections. Informal mutual aid societies persisted, often in defiance of legal restrictions.

In 1835, the Humann Law formally recognized sociétés de secours mutuel (mutual aid societies), establishing a regulated framework for collective risk sharing. However, these societies remained limited in scale and accessibility due to costs.

=== Development of state-led social insurance ===
The late 19th and early 20th centuries saw the state assume a more active role in social insurance. Key milestones included:

- 1893: Introduction of free medical assistance for indigent citizens under the Loi sur l'assistance médicale
- 1898: Passage of the Loi sur l'indemnisation des accidents du travail, enabling workers to claim compensation for workplace injuries
- 1910: Implementation of mandatory retirement insurance for workers under the Loi sur les retraites ouvrières et paysannes

These measures laid the foundation for a national solidarity system, complementing private mutual aid initiatives.

=== Impact of the World Wars ===
The social upheaval of the First World War accelerated the role of the state in social insurance, recognizing its necessity for societal stability. A major leap occurred in 1928 and 1930 with laws extending mandatory health and maternity insurance to salaried workers and agricultural laborers.

The Second World War further reshaped social insurance. Influenced by the resistance movement and principles from the Conseil national de la Résistance, reforms culminated in the establishment of the modern Sécurité sociale system via the Ordonnances des 4 et 19 octobre 1945.

=== Creation of Sécurité sociale ===
The unified system of Sécurité sociale in 1945 consolidated existing fragmented schemes. It aimed to guarantee universal access to healthcare, pensions, and family allowances. Under the leadership of figures like Ambroise Croizat, the system adopted principles of solidarity, pooling resources from employers and employees to cover various social risks.

=== Reforms and challenges ===
The subsequent decades witnessed expansions, including the 1978 removal of employment prerequisites for healthcare coverage and the introduction of Couverture maladie universelle (universal health coverage) in 1999. However, financial constraints and political debates led to periodic reforms to balance funding and expenditures, culminating in the 2023 retirement reforms.

== Principles ==
Assurances sociales are characterized by:

- Compulsory Participation: All salaried workers are mandated to contribute.
- Solidarity: Contributions are proportionate to income, ensuring equitable access.
- Risk Pooling: Funds are collectively managed, with benefits distributed based on need rather than contributions.
