= Pierre Mendès France =

French politician (1907–1982)

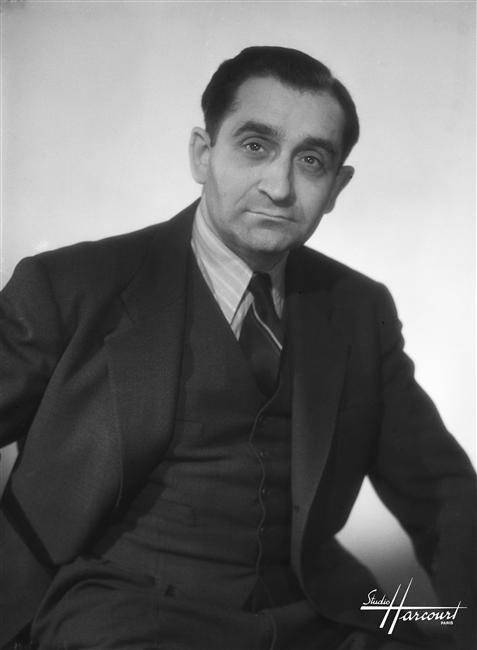
- Mendès France in 1948

Prime Minister of France
- In office 18 June 1954 – 23 February 1955
- President: René Coty
- Preceded by: Joseph Laniel
- Succeeded by: Edgar Faure

Minister of Foreign Affairs
- In office 18 June 1954 – 20 January 1955
- Prime Minister: Himself
- Preceded by: Georges Bidault
- Succeeded by: Edgar Faure

Mayor of Louviers
- In office 13 March 1953 – 27 November 1958
- Preceded by: Marcel Malherbe
- Succeeded by: André Vincelot
- In office 17 May 1935 – 20 September 1939
- Preceded by: Raoul Thorel
- Succeeded by: Auguste Fromentin

President of the General Council of Eure
- In office 6 October 1945 – 6 December 1958
- Preceded by: Office established
- Succeeded by: Gustave Héon

Minister of National Economics
- In office 4 September 1944 – 6 April 1945
- Prime Minister: Charles de Gaulle
- Preceded by: Office established
- Succeeded by: René Pleven

Commissioner for Finances
- In office 3 November 1943 – 4 September 1944
- President: Charles de Gaulle
- Preceded by: Maurice Couve de Murville
- Succeeded by: Aimé Lepercq

Personal details
- Born: Pierre Isaac Isidore Mendès France; 11 January 1907 Paris, France
- Died: 18 October 1982 (aged 75) Paris, France
- Party: Radical (1924–1959); Autonomous Socialist (1959–1960); Unified Socialist (1960–1971)
- Spouses: Lily Cicurel (m. 1933; died 1967) Marie-Claire Servan-Schreiber (m. 1971)
- Children: 2
- Education: University of Paris

Pierre Isaac Isidore Mendès France (French pronunciation: [pjɛʁ izak izidɔʁ mɑ̃dɛs fʁɑ̃s]; 11 January 1907 – 18 October 1982) was a French politician who served as prime minister of France for eight months from 1954 to 1955. As a member of the Radical Party, he headed a government supported by a coalition of Gaullists (RPF), moderate socialists (UDSR), Christian democrats (MRP) and liberal-conservatives (CNIP). Pierre-Mendès France is primarily remembered as the French Prime Minister who was in office at the outbreak of the Algerian independence war in 1954. During his tenure, France initiated close military cooperation with Israel, selling arms and aircraft to the young state. Mendès-France laid the groundwork for France’s military nuclear program and the early transfer of nuclear technology to Israel.

== Early life ==
Mendès France was born on 11 January 1907 in Paris, the son of a textile merchant from Limoges. He was descended from Portuguese Jews who settled in France in the 16th century. He studied at the École des sciences politiques and the Faculty of Law of Paris, graduating with a doctorate in law and becoming the youngest member of the Paris bar association in 1926, at age 19. In 1924, Mendès France joined the Radical Party, the traditional party of the French middle-class centre-left (not to be confused with the mainstream SFIO, often called the Socialist Party). He married Lili Cicurel, the niece of Salvator Cicurel.

== Third Republic and World War II ==
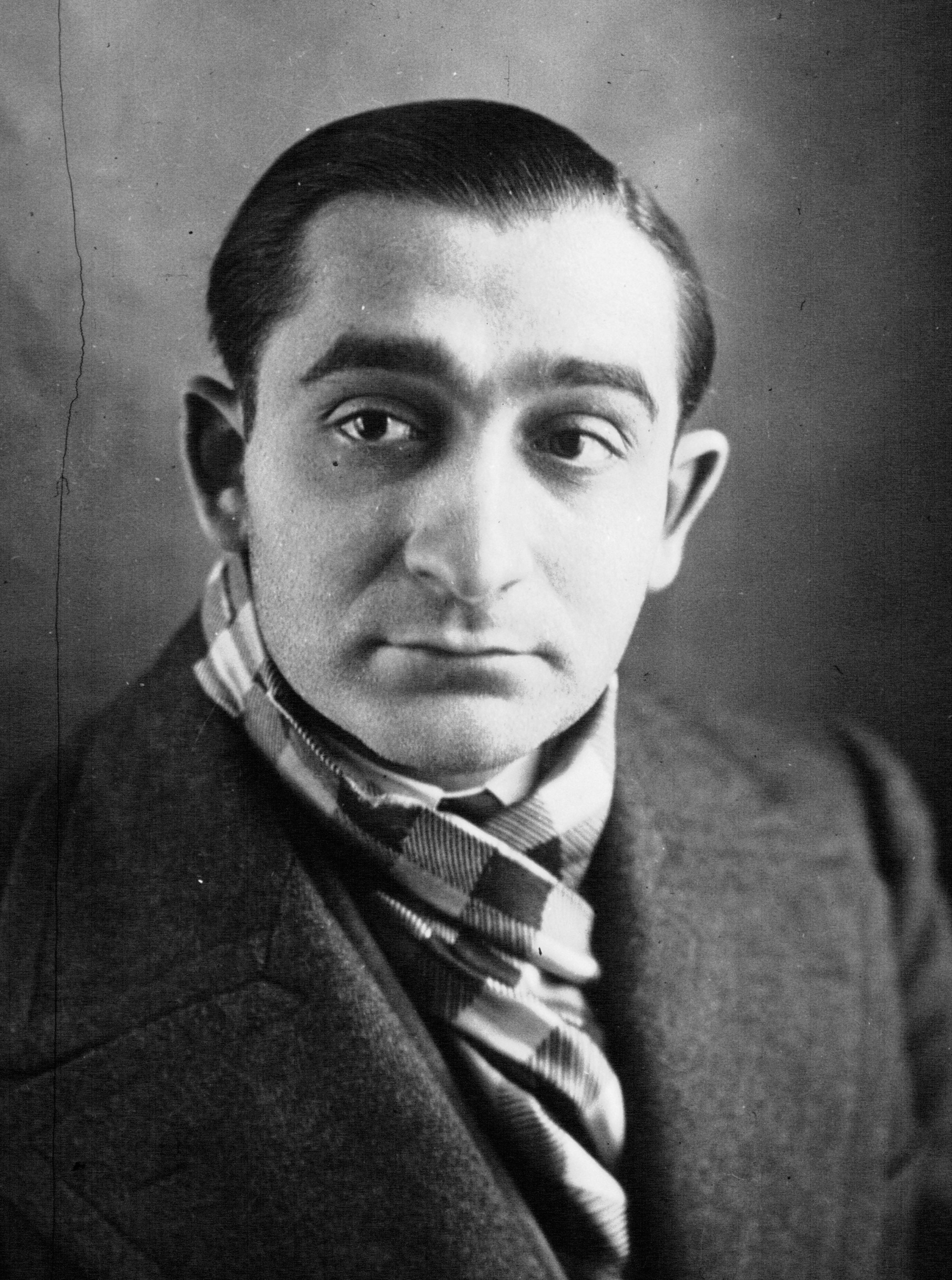
Mendès France in 1932

In 1932, Mendès France was elected member of the Chamber of Deputies for the Eure department; he was the Assembly's youngest member. In 1936 he came within 700 votes of losing to Modeste Legouez, the president of the radical agrarian group the Comités de défense paysanne in what he said was his hardest electoral fight. His ability was soon recognized, and in 1938 the government of Léon Blum appointed him Under Secretary of State for Finance.

In October 1940, France was put on trial by the Vichy regime at the courthouse in Clermont-Ferrand for desertion after he boarded the liner SS Massilia for Casablanca in Morocco to continue the fight against the Nazis. He was imprisoned for desertion. He escaped and succeeded in reaching Britain, where he joined the Free French forces led by Charles de Gaulle. Mendès France later described his trial, conviction and subsequent escape in the celebrated documentary "The Sorrow and the Pity".

During the latter years of the war, Mendès France served in the Free French Air Forces and flew in a dozen bombing raids. After the Liberation of Paris in August 1944, he was appointed Minister for National Economy in the French provisional government by de Gaulle. He later headed the French delegation to the 1944 United Nations Monetary and Financial Conference at Bretton Woods.

Mendès France soon fell out with the Finance Minister, René Pleven. Mendès France supported state regulation of wages and prices to control inflation, while Pleven favoured generally laissez-faire policies. When de Gaulle sided with Pleven, Mendès France resigned. Nonetheless, de Gaulle valued Mendès France's abilities, and appointed him as a director of the International Bank for Reconstruction and Development, and as French representative to the United Nations Economic and Social Council.

== Fourth Republic ==
In 1947, after democratic French politics resumed under the Fourth Republic, Mendès France was re-elected to the National Assembly. He first tried to form a government in June 1953, but was unable to gain the numbers in the Assembly. From 1950 he had been a consistent opponent of French colonialism, and by 1954 France was becoming hopelessly embroiled in major colonial conflicts: the First Indochina War and the Algerian War of Independence. Vietnamese Communists inflicted a serious defeat on French forces at the Dien Bien Phu in May 1954. The government of Joseph Laniel resigned on June 12, and Mendès France formed a government with support from the centre-right.

Mendès France immediately negotiated an agreement with Ho Chi Minh, the Vietnamese Communist leader. There was, he said, no choice but total withdrawal from Indochina, and the Assembly supported him by 471 votes to 14. Nevertheless, nationalist opinion was shocked, and Roman Catholic opinion opposed abandoning the Vietnamese believers to Communism. A tirade of abuse, much of it anti-Semitic, was directed at Mendès France. Jean-Marie Le Pen, then a Poujadist member of the Assembly, described his "patriotic, almost physical repulsion" for Mendès France.

At the outbreak of the Algerian War of Independence in 1954, Pierre Mendès France firmly reaffirmed that Algeria was an integral part of France and rejected any notion of negotiation with nationalist movements. He declared to the French parliament : "There can be no compromise when it comes to defending the internal peace of the nation, its unity, and the integrity of the Republic. The departments of Algeria are an integral part of the French Republic [...] The idea of secession is unthinkable".

Later, Mendès France next came to an agreement with Habib Bourguiba, the nationalist leader in Tunisia, for the independence of that colony by 1956, and began discussions with the nationalist leaders in Morocco for a French withdrawal. He also favoured concessions to the nationalists in Algeria; but the presence of a million Pied-noirs there left the colonial power no easy way to extricate itself from that situation. The future mercenary Bob Denard was convicted in 1954 and sentenced to fourteen months in prison for an assassination attempt against Mendès France.

Mendès France hoped that the Radical Party would become the party of modernization and renewal in French politics, replacing the SFIO. An advocate of greater European integration, he helped bring about the formation of the Western European Union, and proposed far-reaching economic reform. He also favoured defence co-operation with other European countries, but the National Assembly rejected the proposal for a European Defence Community, mainly because of misgivings about Germany's participation.

His cabinet fell in February 1955. In 1956 he served as Minister of State in the cabinet headed by the SFIO leader Guy Mollet, but resigned over Mollet's handling of the Algerian War, which was coming to dominate French politics. His split over Algeria with Edgar Faure, leader of the conservative wing of the Radical Party, led to Mendès France resigning as party leader in 1957.

== Fifth Republic ==
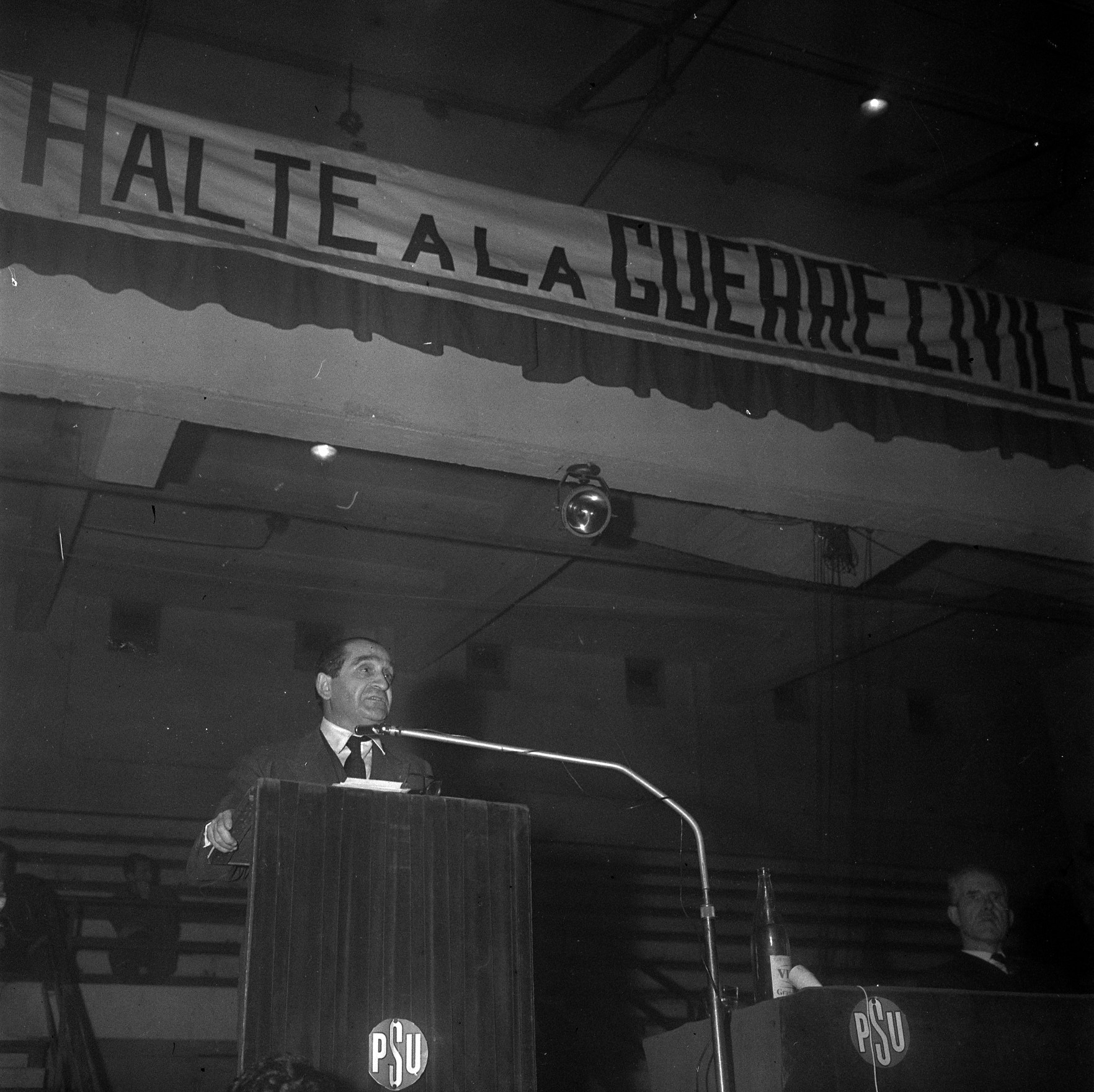
Mendès France, against the Algerian War during a PSU meeting in January 1962.

Like most of the French left, Mendès France opposed de Gaulle's seizure of power in May 1958, when the mounting crisis in Algeria brought about a breakdown in the Fourth Republic system and the creation of a Fifth Republic. He led the Union of Democratic Forces, an anti-Gaullist group, but in the November 1958 elections he lost his seat in the Assembly. After being expelled from the Radical Party, whose majority faction supported de Gaulle, in late 1959 he joined the Autonomous Socialist Party (PSA), a breakaway group from the SFIO.

In April 1960, the PSA merged with several other groups to form the Unified Socialist Party (PSU). He made an unsuccessful bid to regain his seat in the National Assembly representing Eure in the 1962 election.

In 1967 he returned to the Assembly as a PSU member for the Isère, but again lost his seat in the 1968 landslide election victory of the Gaullist party UDR. Mendès France and the PSU expressed sympathy for the sentiments and actions of the student rioters during the events of May 1968, a position unusual for a politician of his age and status. One year later, Pompidou's socialist opponent in the presidential election of 1969, Gaston Defferre of the SFIO, designated him his preferred Prime Minister prior to the election. The two campaigned together in what was the first – and so far only – dual "ticket" in a French presidential election. Defferre gained only 5% of the vote and was eliminated in the election's first round. When François Mitterrand formed a new Socialist Party in 1971, Mendès France supported him, but did not attempt another political comeback. He lived long enough to see Mitterrand elected president.

== Political career ==
Governmental function

- President of the Council of Ministers : 1954–1955.
- Minister of Foreign Affairs : 1954–1955.
- Minister of State : January–May 1956 (Resignation).

Electoral mandates

National Assembly of France

- Member of the National Assembly of France for Eure : 1932–1942 (Deposition by Philippe Pétain) / 1946–1958. Elected in 1932, reelected in 1936, 1946, 1951, 1956.
- Member of the National Assembly of France for Isère (2nd constituency) : 1967–1968. Elected in 1968.

General Council

- President of the General Council of Eure : 1951–1958. Reelected in 1955.
- General councillor of Eure : 1937–1958. Reelected in 1945, 1951.

Municipal council

- Mayor of Louviers : 1935–1939 (Resignation) / 1953–1958 (Resignation). Reelected in 1953.
- Municipal councillor of Louviers : 1935–1939 (Resignation) / 1953–1958 (Resignation). Reelected in 1953.

== Mendès France's first Ministry, 19 June 1954 – 20 January 1955 ==
- Pierre Mendès France – President of the Council and Minister of Foreign Affairs
- Marie Pierre Koenig – Minister of National Defense and Armed Forces
- François Mitterrand – Minister of the Interior
- Edgar Faure – Minister of Finance, Economic Affairs, and Planning
- Maurice Bourgès-Maunoury – Minister of Commerce and Industry
- Eugène Claudius-Petit – Minister of Labour and Social Security
- Émile Hugues – Minister of Justice
- Jean Berthoin – Minister of National Education
- Emmanuel Temple – Minister of Veterans and War Victims
- Roger Houdet – Minister of Agriculture
- Robert Buron – Minister of Overseas France
- Jacques Chaban-Delmas – Minister of Public Works, Transport, and Tourism
- Louis Aujoulat – Minister of Public Health and Population
- Maurice Lemaire – Minister of Reconstruction and Housing
- Christian Fouchet – Minister of Moroccan and Tunisian Affairs
- Guy La Chambre – Minister of Relations with Partner States

Changes

- 14 August 1954 – Emmanuel Temple succeeds Koenig as Minister of National Defense and Armed Forces. Maurice Bourgès-Maunoury succeeds Chaban-Delmas as interim Minister of Public Works, Transport, and Tourism. Eugène Claudius-Petit succeeds Lemaire as interim Minister of Reconstruction and Housing.
- 3 September 1954 – Jean Masson succeeds Temple as Minister of Veterans and War Victims. Jean-Michel Guérin de Beaumont succeeds Hugues as Minister of Justice. Henri Ulver succeeds Bourgès-Maunoury as Minister of Commerce and Industry. Jacques Chaban-Delmas succeeds Bourgès-Maunoury as Minister of Public Works, Transport, and Tourism and Claudius-Petit as Minister of Reconstruction and Housing. Louis Aujoulat succeeds Claudius-Petit as Minister of Labour and Social Security. André Monteil succeeds Aujoulat as Minister of Public Health and Population.
- 12 November 1954 – Maurice Lemaire succeeds Chaban-Delmas as Minister of Reconstruction and Housing.

== Mendès France's second Ministry, 20 January 1955 – 23 February 1955 ==
- Pierre Mendès France – President of the Council and Minister of Foreign Affairs
- Edgar Faure – Minister of Foreign Affairs
- Jacques Chevallier – Minister of National Defense
- Maurice Bourgès-Maunoury – Minister of Armed Forces
- François Mitterrand – Minister of the Interior
- Robert Buron – Minister of Finance, Economic Affairs, and Planning
- Henri Ulver – Minister of Commerce and Industry
- Louis Aujoulat – Minister of Labor and Social Security
- Emmanuel Temple – Minister of Justice
- Raymond Schmittlein – Minister of Merchant Marine
- Jean Berthoin – Minister of National Education
- Jean Masson – Minister of Veterans and War Victims
- Roger Houdet – Minister of Agriculture
- Jean-Jacques Juglas – Minister of Overseas France
- Jacques Chaban-Delmas – Minister of Public Works, Transport, and Tourism
- André Monteil – Minister of Public Health and Population
- Maurice Lemaire – Minister of Reconstruction and Housing
- Christian Fouchet – Minister of Moroccan and Tunisian Affairs
- Guy La Chambre – Minister of Relations with Partner States

== Honours ==
=== National honours ===
- Commander of the Legion of Honour
- Croix de Guerre 1939–1945
- Resistance Medal

=== Foreign honours ===
- Belgium: Grand Officer of the Order of Leopold (Belgium)
- Morocco: Grand Cordon of the Order of Ouissam Alaouite
- Monaco: Gran Cross of the Order of Saint-Charles
- Tunisia: Grand Cordon of the Order of Glory (Tunisia)

== See also ==
- Tristan Mendès France

Political offices
Preceded by Maurice Couve de Murville	Free French Commissioner for Finance; 1943–1944	Succeeded by –
Preceded by Pierre Cathala	Minister of National Economy; 1944–1945	Succeeded by René Pleven
Preceded by Joseph Laniel	Prime Minister of France; 1954–1955	Succeeded by Edgar Faure
Preceded by Georges Bidault	Minister of Foreign Affairs; 1954–1955	Succeeded by Edgar Faure
Preceded by —	Minister of State; 1956	Succeeded by —
