= Henri Poupart-Lafarge =

French engineer and businessman

- Born: 10 April 1969 (age 57); Nancy, France
- Education: École polytechnique École des ponts ParisTech; MIT
- Occupation: CEO of Alstom

Henri Poupart-Lafarge (born 10 April 1969) is a French business executive and the current CEO of Alstom, a post which he has occupied since February 2016.

== Career ==
=== Career in the public sector ===
After acquiring degrees from École polytechnique in 1988, École des ponts ParisTech (Corps des Ponts et Chaussées), and MIT, Poupart-Lafarge went to work for the World Bank. In 1994, he joined the French Ministry for the Economy and Finance.

=== Career in the private sector ===
By 1998, Poupart-Lafarge became Alstom's Head of Investor Relations. Then, he became the Vice President of Distribution Finance.

Before occupying the position of Alstom's CEO, Poupart-Lafarge was successively Chief Financial Officer of Alstom and President of two sectors of the Alstom Group, Alstom Grid for one year, then Alstom Transport for five years.

== Other activities ==
- Société Générale, Independent Member of the Board of Directors (since 2021)
- Vallourec, Independent Member of the Board of Directors (2014–2018)
- Transmashholding, Independent Member of the Board of Directors (2012–2019)

Business positions
Preceded by Patrick Kron	CEO of Alstom; 2016–present	Succeeded by Incumbent
