= Pierre Bilger =

French businessman (1940–2011)

- Born: 27 May 1940; Colmar, France
- Died: 4 March 2011 (aged 70); Paris, France
- Education: Sciences Po, ÉNA
- Occupations: Businessman and civil servant
- Known for: CEO of Alstom (1991-2003)
- Children: 5
- Family: Philippe Bilger (brother)

Pierre Bilger (May 27, 1940 – March 4, 2011) was a French high-ranking civil servant and businessman. He was a tax inspector and advisor to several ministers. He served as the chief executive officer of Alstom from 1991 to 2003.

== Early life ==
Pierre Bilger was born on May 27, 1940, in Colmar, France. His father, Joseph Bilger, was an agrarian politician who received a ten-year jail sentence after World War II for collaborating with Nazi Germany. Bilger grew up in Montargis with his mother, his two brothers (economist François Bilger and prosecutor Philippe Bilger), and his sister.

Bilger was educated at the Collège Saint-Louis, a Roman Catholic school in Montargis. He graduated from Sciences Po and the École nationale d'administration.

== Career ==
Bilger served as a tax inspector and he authored a report on the monthly payment of the income tax (as opposed to annually). His report subsequently led to a new law passed by parliament. Meanwhile, Bilger worked for Treasury Minister Jean-Pierre Fourcade, Labour Ministers Michel Durafour and Robert Boulin, and Budget Minister Maurice Papon.

Bilger joined Alstom in 1987. He served as its chief executive officer from 1991 to 2003. During his tenure, two of its shareholders, General Electric Company plc and Alcatel, divested from Alstom. Meanwhile, Bilger spearheaded its international expansion. Upon his retirement in 2003, he turned down a 4.1 million Euro golden parachute because Alstom was experiencing difficulties.

Bilger served on the boards of directors of Société Générale, Thales Group and Eurotunnel.

Bilger was the author of two books. He became an Officer of the Legion of Honour and a Commander of the National Order of Merit.

== Personal life and death ==
Bilger was married, and had 5 children.

Bilger died of leukemia on March 4, 2011, in Paris. He was 70 years old.

== Works ==
- Bilger, Pierre (2004). Quatre millions d'euros : le prix de ma liberté. Paris: Bourin éditeur. ISBN 9782849410080. OCLC 418960320.
- Bilger, Pierre (2007). Causeries à bâtons rompus. Paris: Le Publieur. ISBN 9782350610115. OCLC 470849564.
