= Léon Lauvray =

French politician

- Born: 24 September 1877; Évreux, Eure, France
- Died: 4 June 1965 (aged 87); Évreux, Eure, France
- Occupation(s): Engineer, politician

Léon Lauvray (24 September 1877 – 4 June 1965) was a French politician. He served as a member of the Chamber of Deputies from 1928 to 1932 and the Senate from 1938 to 1945, representing Eure.
