= International Agrarian Bureau =

International political organization

International Agrarian Bureau (International Peasant Union)
- Four-leaf clover logo as used by the Republican Party of Farmers and Peasants; popularized by the IAB as an agrarian symbol

- Countries and regions with IAB members, before 1935 Founding members (joined 1921) Joined by 1927 Joined by 1934 Bavarian People's Party (involved in 1921) Greek Agrarian Party (joined in 1930, dropped out in 1931) Note: Shaded areas represent regional parties.
- Abbreviation: IAB/IPU
- Formation: November 1921; 105 years ago
- Dissolved: 1971; 55 years ago
- Type: Political international
- Purpose: Agrarianism; Cooperative movement Pan-Slavism (to 1927); European federalism Anti-communism; Anti-fascism
- Location(s): Prague (1921–1938); Washington, D.C. (1947–1964?, 1971); New York City (1964?–1971)
- Region served: Europe (originally); Central and Eastern Europe (from 1947)
- President: Karel Mečíř (first); Ferenc Nagy (last)
- Secretary-General: G. M. Dimitrov (first)
- Main organ: Bulletin du Bureau International Agricole; Monthly Bulletin of the International Peasant Union

The International Agrarian Bureau (IAB; Czech: Mezinárodní Agrární Bureau, French: Bureau International Agraire), commonly known as the Green International (Zelená Internacionála, Internationale Verte), was founded in 1921 by the agrarian parties of Bulgaria, Czechoslovakia, Poland and Yugoslavia. The creation of a continental association of peasants was championed by Aleksandar Stamboliyski of the Bulgarian Agrarian National Union, but originated with earlier attempts by Georg Heim. Following Stamboliyski's downfall in 1923, the IAB came to be dominated by the Republican Party of Farmers and Peasants in Czechoslovakia, whose member Karel Mečíř served as its first leader. Mečíř was able to extend the IAB beyond its core in Slavic Europe, obtaining support from the National Peasants' Party in Greater Romania; as an ideologue, Milan Hodža introduced the Green International to European federalism.

Hodža also redefined international agrarianism as a "Third Way" movement. The Bureau was thus a key competitor with the Krestintern, or "Red Peasant International", which existed as a proxy of the Communist International (or Comintern). In 1929 to 1934, the IAB also gathered allegiances from parties in other areas of the continent, managing to draw the Croatian Peasant Party away from the Krestintern, and helping to create the French Agrarian and Peasant Party. This drive was interrupted by the spread of fascism, which identified Greens as its enemies—although some sections of the IAB came to favor cooperation with the various fascist movements. From 1933, Nazi Germany also interfered directly in the politics of IAB countries. Germany's occupation of Czechoslovakia, and subsequently its takeover of Continental Europe, put an end to IAB activities, though attempts were still made to revive it from London.

In 1947, the Bureau was reestablished as the International Peasant Union (IPU), grouping agrarianist refugees from the Eastern Bloc. This group incorporated the Polish People's Party and the Hungarian Smallholders Party, whose leaders Stanisław Mikołajczyk and Ferenc Nagy were successively IPU presidents. Primarily anti-communist, this Green International fought a propaganda war against the Soviet Union, exposing its involvement in mass murders and its brutal oppression of agrarian movements.

This new Green International was powerless in effecting political change in Soviet-dominated countries, although its activities attracted the attention of communist regimes, who described the IPU as "fascist". In 1952, authorities in the Czechoslovak Socialist Republic indicted a number of political and intellectual figures during a show trial of the Green International; the sentences were overturned in the 1960s. Beset by financial troubles, apathy, and disagreements between its leaders, the IPU itself was inactive from 1971.

== IAB ==
=== Origins ===
The concept of a "Green International" in the service of peasant interests dates back to the 1900s: in 1905, an Italian Socialist Party newspaper voiced hopes that such a movement would be formed around the International Institute of Agriculture. In 1907, an International Confederation of Agricultural Associations was formed in the German Empire, but it failed to survive World War I. It was later partly revived as a Pan-German Peasants' Association, which received memberships from the Low Countries and Scandinavia. The notion of a "Green International" was again explored during the early interwar period, being embraced by Georg Heim of the Bavarian People's Party (BVP). From late 1918, at a height of a revolutionary upheaval in Europe in 1918, Heim worked on the unification of "peasant and conservative forces from all countries." His effort only touched the former Central Powers and countries that had been neutral in World War I: a conference at Berlin in mid-1919 had delegates from Weimar Germany, German Austria, Hungary, and the Netherlands; Swiss and Belgian politicians sent messages of support, although the Dutch delegation itself remained skeptical about the possibility of Heim's movement being successful.

In November 1920, Heim was in Budapest, advocating for a parallel rapprochement between the Hungarian Kingdom, the Austrian Republic, and Bavaria. He also channeled support for the Green International, described by one of his Hungarian disciples as an effective way to combat Comintern influence—since "the so-called 'bourgeois' classes proved incapable of toppling Bolshevism on their own." According to the same source, the International was supposed to diffuse the "ideas of order" among the peasant class, while endorsing the cooperative movement and regulating the market for the benefit of all classes, "not just peasant producers".

The emerging organization was centered on Vienna, selected by Heim because of its location, but also because of his belief that Austria needed to be kept distinct from Germany; another factor was that Austria was governed by the Christian Social Party, whose members were "principally recruited among the peasant masses". Heim earned pledges of support from throughout Central and Eastern Europe; his project therefore superseded a rival attempt by the Farmers' League (BdL) in Sudetenland to form a Pan-German "Congress of Peasants". He was unable to prevent competition by the International Peasant Congress, which was centered on Strasbourg and reserved membership for countries that had also joined the League of Nations—thus excluding Weimar Germany.

This group, itself dubbed a "Green International", held its second meeting in Paris in November 1920. During its sessions, Angelo Mauri of the Italian People's Party proposed a merger with Heim's group, which Heim himself welcomed. Reports of the following year suggest that Heim had also earned promises of support from Venstre in Denmark, from the Peasants' League (PB) of the Netherlands, and from the Agrarian Party in Hungary. The Peasants' Party (PȚ) of Greater Romania and the Agrarian Party (ZS) of Yugoslavia were also participants in Heim's exchange. In mid-1921, Hungarian agrarianist János Mayer made an effort to mediate between the French- and German-centered peasant Internationals, but the former adamantly refused. Managed by Swiss farmer Ernst Laur, the International Peasant Congress survived to at least 1929, when its European and American members met in Bucharest. However, it had by then evolved into a non-political movement.

=== Creation ===
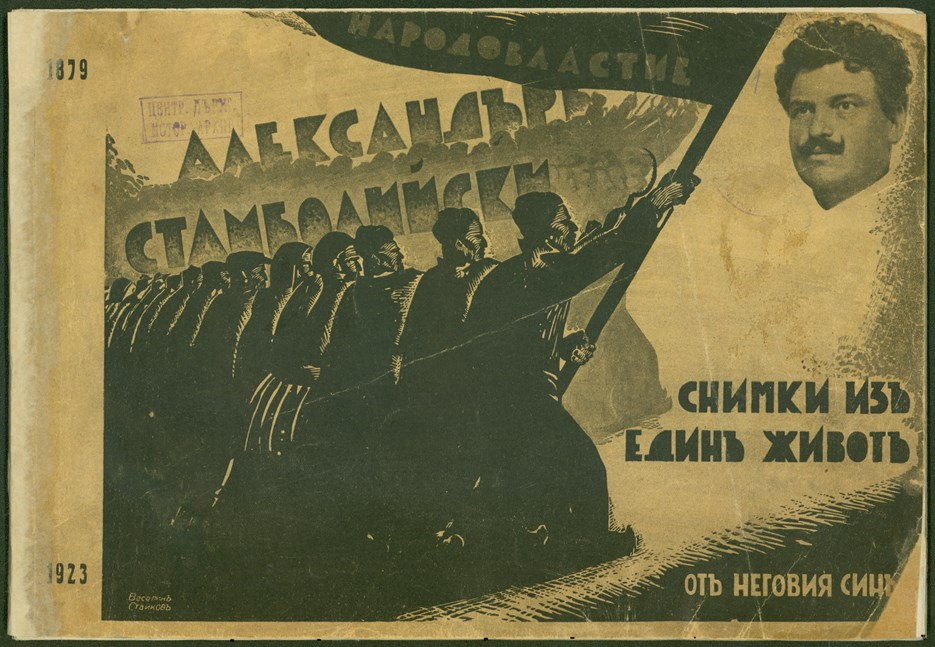
Allegory of Aleksandar Stamboliyski's leadership of the peasants. From a 1935 album by his son

Other early efforts to organize peasant representatives into an international lobby were carried by the Bulgarian Agrarian National Union (BZNS), whose leader, Aleksandar Stamboliyski, was the then-Prime Minister of Bulgaria. In May 1920, he declared his intention to establish a form of "agrarian representation" alongside the Republican Party of Farmers and Peasants (RSZML) in Czechoslovakia. He believed that RSZML would also ensure reconciliation between Bulgarians and Yugoslavs, after the nations had been separated by World War I. These attempts achieved public notoriety in February 1921. In that context, Stamboliyski openly described his project as resistance to the red peril, a "peasant dictatorship to oppose the dictatorship of the proletariat". French journalist P. de Docelles also noted that Stamboliyski had "transposed all of Lenin's formulas": "he will oppose the Green International to the Red International; and private property to communism".

While visiting Czechoslovakia earlier that year, Stamboliyski had approached the RSZML directly, announcing that they would form an "International Peasant Union" as a League of Nations subsidiary. Antonín Švehla of the RSZML was to serve as its leader, with Stamboliyski expressing new hopes that this mediation would bring Yugoslav agrarianists into his movement. The original International Bureau, set up in Prague in November 1921, was still limited to three countries in Slavic Europe (including Yugoslavia). It was also briefly joined by White émigrés representing the by-then-defunct Russian Republic. However, in January 1921 Stamboliyski also visited non-Slavic Romania, meeting with the PȚ's Ion Mihalache and Virgil Madgearu, and discussing prospects for regional cooperation.

The new peasant caucus is described by scholar Saturnino M. Borras Jr and colleagues as a continuation of Heim's movement. However, it found itself criticized by Austrian conservative Erik von Kuehnelt-Leddihn, who described the Green International as a front for agrarian socialism, the "peasant-boot dictatorship". On such grounds, Stamboliyski's initiative was well-received by Europe's anti-communist left. Anarchist Augustin Hamon saw it as the peasant's coming of age, noting that agrarian countries had all gone through a land reform. This meant that "capitalists" controlled the "agrarian revolution", but only for a brief moment; Hamon identified an ideological incompatibility between BVP conservatives and Stamboliyski's radicals. According to Hamon, industrial and agricultural workers were natural allies, since "one cannot be strong without the other", meaning that the Green International would find itself "pushed" into an alliance with the Comintern. Similarities between the two bodies were noted by journalist Albert Londres, who called attention to Stamboliyski's "little terror" in Bulgaria, including his institution of compulsory labor. Hamon's sympathetic vision was criticized by Adolphe Hodee, an agricultural trade unionist, who suggested that the "Green International" was fundamentally reactionary, a corollary of Luigi Sturzo's "White International". As Hodee put it: "Stronger and more dangerous than ever, peasant individualism opposes social progress under the communist banner, under the white banner, under the green banner."

Both assessments are dismissed by more modern scholars, who note that Stamboliyski wished to found "an international agricultural league that would serve as protection against both the reactionary 'White International' of the royalists and landlords and the 'Red International' of the Bolsheviks". As argued by the writing duo known as Marius-Ary Leblond, European socialists, their prestige greatly damaged by the Russian Revolution, were no longer able to exercise any influence over the peasant movement and "coalesce [it] against Capital." Leblond proposed that "the Greens in Danubian countries, who are some of the most conscious and determined, alongside those of France and Russia, will form a powerful anti-Red coalition." Historian Bianca Valota Cavallotti believes that the Greens could have been natural allies of the Second International, but also notes that they developed their movement in poorly industrialized countries, where social democracy had no pull.

At the BZNS' 1921 reunion in Sofia, banners read: "Long live the International that will consecrate the fraternity of European peoples and will suppress minority rule!"; and "To the gallows with those responsible for the disaster [of World War I] and with the militarists!" As argued by Docelles, the congress was superficial in its attempt to discuss the "international side of the peasant issue". Though invitations to attend were extended to the BVP and the German Agrarian League, as well as to the RSZML and Balkan agrarianists, "few foreign delegates were able to reach the Bulgarian capital." In June, Prague was announced as the seat of a "Green International Bureau", which was set to gather worldwide affiliations in preparation for the actual establishment of a plenary body. From July of that year, members of earlier initiatives, including Mauri and the BZNS' Nikola Petkov, also joined Adrien Toussaint's International Confederation of Agricultural Syndicates.

In August 1921, scholar Gustave Welter proposed that the Green International would emerge as the strongest one in existence, and would bring about world peace, "since [peasants] are always the first ones to get killed". This hope was contrasted by reality, with Valota Cavallotti defining Stamboliyski's network as "surely one of the least important ones to have emerged on the Continent in the 19th and 20th centuries", a "series of attempts" rather than a coherent movement. The BZNS was able to obtain representation from the RSZML, the ZS, and the Piast Party of Poland.

=== 1923 hiatus ===
Other interwar agrarian alliances: Bloc of Agrarian Countries Maniu Plan for a federal "Little Europe"

The project was disrupted by the BSNS' fall from power in the Bulgarian coup of 1923, during which Stamboliyski was murdered. As noted by journalist Paul Gentizon, these events were intimately related to Stamboliyski's vision of peasant internationalism, since this implied containing old rivalries between Bulgaria and Yugoslavia, while overshadowing the agenda of Macedonian Bulgarians. Agrarian cooperation was also enhanced after the September Uprising, when Mihalache's PȚ organized a relief campaign in support of Bulgarian refugees to Romania. In late 1923, the Comintern's competing agrarian body emerged in Moscow as the Krestintern. Its profile suggested that the new Soviet Union had entered a "uniquely pro-peasant period". The new group was nevertheless hastily created, as "there were practically no peasant organizations on which it could be based", and as such had to recruit among mainstream agrarian groups. Viktor Chernov, the Russian anti-communist, noted in 1924 that Krestintern agents were active "in the same countries as the Green International, an organization which, as a matter of fact, has failed."

By 1924, groups situated on the BZNS' left had formed a tactical alliance with the Krestintern, preparing another ill-fated insurgency against Bulgarian dictator Aleksandar Tsankov; in May 1926, they adhered to the Moscow International, but kept the matter secret, so that the party would not be split apart. By contrast, BZNS right-wingers only looked to the IAB. Red Peasants and Bulgarian Communists made overtures toward the Bulgarian agrarianist exiles in Prague, but the talks were inconclusive. Tsankov then used the Krestintern's documented activities as a pretext to allege that the Green International had always been a Comintern plot, in conjunction with the local Comintern chapters; Tsankov noted that some of Stamboliyski's former ministers had since been co-opted by Moscow.

In Yugoslavia, the Croatian Peasant Party (HSS), led at the time by Stjepan Radić, embraced separatism and agreed to join the Krestintern as a means to advance it. Radić explained at the time that his agrarianism was spectral-syncretic, combining elements of the "revolutionary east" and the "conservative west". His decision upset Yugoslavist intellectuals, with the Obzor group suggesting that the HSS had better join the mainstream Greens. During late 1924, PȚ activists Madgearu and Nicolae L. Lupu visited Radić and discussed with him new forms of agrarian rapprochement; Madgearu also visited the Bureau in Prague, discussing his projects with Švehla, who was serving as Czechoslovak Premier. Such contacts were observed by the Krestintern, which reportedly sent friendly letters to be read at the PȚ's National Congress in 1924. Romanian Peasantists refrained from answering, since Romania had not yet established diplomatic contacts with the Soviets. Comintern sources describe the letters as black propaganda by anti-communist exiles.

Radić was eventually arrested in 1925; his confiscated papers included notes by Grigory Zinoviev, in which the Green International was referred to as a tool for "the rich landowners and the bourgeoisie". Days later, Radić signed a truce with the Yugoslav establishment, and left the Krestintern. The latter was forced to attempt recruitment in other parts of Yugoslavia, and was joined by a numerically smaller Agrarian Democratic Party, while also seeking to infiltrate and influence the HSS' left-wing. From Romania, the PȚ observed and condemned the clampdown in Yugoslavia, before rejoicing at news that the HSS had reconciled with the establishment. Nevertheless, the agrarian movement was again inhibited by the Polish Coup of May 1926, upon which the Piast Party was outlawed. Forced into exile, Piast leader Wincenty Witos moved to Prague as a guest of the IAB.

In the wake of the Bulgarian and Polish coups, agrarianist leaders in Central Europe were absorbed into projects for regional economic cooperation. During this period, Iuliu Maniu, who became Prime Minister of Romania, proceeded to champion a Danubian Federation, and put effort into creating the rudiments of a Central European single market. His "Maniu Plan" for a "Little Europe", circulated in 1930, proposed the confederation of 8 Central European states. Attempting to reconcile small democracies with Italian fascism, Maniu also argued in favor of including Italy as a ninth member of "Little Europe". Dissatisfied with the World Economic Conference of 1927, which appeared to favor industrialized nations, Poland opened up to such offers; it led regional partners in creating the Bloc of Agrarian Countries, formed at a conference in Warsaw in August 1930. The Bloc also won over Romania's agrarian ideologues, in particular Madgearu.

=== 1927 revival ===
Unofficially overseen by Švehla, and in practice directed by Karel Mečíř, the Bureau put out a trilingual (Czech–French–German) Bulletin. Its first issue, appearing in 1923, included critical analyses of the Russian Revolution, expressing hopes that the New Economic Policy would enshrine peasant property in the Soviet Union, and that "passive peasant resistance to communism" would follow from this. As noted the following year by reviewer André Pierre, the agrarian movement in Europe appeared to have stalled; peasants, he argued, "have very specific national problems to tackle". Pierre proposed instead that the Second International open up an Agrarian Section, to mirror and compete with the Krestintern. Cooperatist doctrinaire G. D. H. Cole similarly argues that Stamboliyski's removal "was the end of the Green International as a serious factor in European affairs and therewith of the peasant revolutionism which, in its Russian manifestation, the Bolsheviks had already subdued to their centralising, industrialist control. This peasant revolutionism never had, I think, much chance of constructive success; but if it had any chance, [Stamboliyski] was the man to lead it."

The IAB relaunched in 1927, after renewed efforts by the RSZML's Milan Hodža. He attended the First Congress of Slavic Peasant Youth in Ljubljana (September 1924), where he spoke of economic liberalism as being "in crisis", and articulated a vision of agrarianism as a "Third Way", rather than as a syncretic policy. This vision was immediately echoed by Witos, who agreed that Polish peasants needed to reject right- and left-wing ideologies. In later interviews, Hodža also argued that "peasant democracy" would reconcile the constituent "races" of Czechoslovakia, including both Czechs and Sudeten Germans, leading to "internal peace from social defense". He wished to export this model for the benefit of "toiling, liberal, peaceful peasants", who rejected all extremes; he also commended the BZNS for having adopted a more "reasonable" stance. In addition, Hodža viewed agrarianism as subsumed to his own take on the Danubian Federation, explaining in 1928: "For the past eight years, I've been searching for a collaborative element for the countries of Central Europe, one that would result in stable equilibrium; I believe to have found it in peasant democracy. If we manage to organize a new Central Europe on this basis, it will then be possible, as an automatic development, to also include Austria".

This ideal coincided with Maniu's plans for economic unification, through the Bloc of Agrarian Countries. Mečíř also contributed, specifically in that he toned down Pan-Slavism, advocating for a purely internationalist line, which welcomed representatives from outside Slavic Europe. However, the notion of Slavic unity was not entirely dropped from IAB statutes, with Švehla declaring that Slavs, as naturally predisposed farmers, were selected to preach a "gospel of land" during a time when, as he saw it, both socialism and liberalism were in crisis. Summits of the Slavic Peasant Youth continued to be held—at Prague, Poznań, and Bratislava; however, Piast delegates were suspicious of such ethnic cooperation, and resented the BZNS's authoritarian tendencies. In October 1926, Mečíř visited Romania and obtained promises that the PȚ would join the IAB as its first non-Slavic member. In fact, later that month, the PȚ fused with Maniu's Romanian National Party to become the National Peasants' Party (PNȚ). This stronger and less radical group was finally accepted into the IAB in October 1927.

In 1928, the IAB had made a final change to its name, becoming known as the International Agrarian Bureau. It was still informally the "Green International". Despite being the least agrarian state of the region, Czechoslovakia was still the centerpiece of all agrarian projects, through both the RSZML and the BdL, which represented the Sudeten Germans. The IAB's permanent seat was in Prague, with Švehla serving as IAB Chairman. Among the founding parties, the BZNS remained factionalized, with one wing still attending Krestintern sessions until being expelled by the party mainstream in 1930.

=== Final expansion ===
In addition to all its other original members, the IAB was able to obtain allegiance from the HSS, as well as from the Dutch PB and the Romanian PNȚ; Piast was eventually replaced by its successor, the Polish People's Party (SL). Other new recruits included four national parties: the Landbund (Austria), the Farmers' Assemblies (Estonia), the Maalaisliitto (Finland), and the Farmers' Union (Latvia); the BdL, ZS and HSS were regional members, as were the Slovene Peasant Party and two Swiss Parties of Farmers and Traders (in Argovia and Bern). An additional member was France's Agrarian and Peasant Party (PAPF). Explicit in its praise of Eastern European agrarianism, it was criticized by left-wing journalist Guy Le Normand as inauthentic and makeshift: "Founded by some slick and dodgy 'intellectuals' [...] who knew how to cleverly exploit a desire of the 'Green International', which was to set up a chapter in France". The PAPF's first congress, held at Paris in January 1929, was attended by Mečíř, for the IAB, and Ferdinand Klindera, of the Czechoslovak cooperative movement.

Though Mečíř claimed to have enlisted 17 political parties from all over Europe into his International, entire regions remained uncovered—including the one-party states. It was never able to canvass for support in Hungary, possibly because Hungarian agrarianists viewed the IAB as an instrument for Czechoslovak foreign policy; most Nordic agrarian groups were also glaringly absent. The Maalaisliitto exception showed that Finnish peasants were becoming aware of similarities between their own agricultural markets and those in "new independent states of the eastern half of Europe". During early 1928, the Ukrainian Agrarian Statist Party (USKhD), founded in Berlin by exiled supporters of the Ukrainian Hetmanate, also looked into the possibility of joining the IAB. This project was quickly vetoed from within by M. Kochubei, who underscored ideological incompatibilities: the USKhD viewed itself as anti-intellectualist, anti-democratic, and corporatist, dismissing the Green International as an intelligentsia movement which "[does] not have a sense of homeland". Kochubei described the IAB's commitment to democracy as "pathological".

Meanwhile, Yugoslavia's agrarian movements experienced crisis, triggered by Radić's murder in 1928. The "Dictatorship of January 6" outlawed them and all other political groups, replacing them with the Yugoslav National Party. The opposition continued to organize clandestinely, and, in the Slovene case, maintained a direct link with the IAB. The Second IAB Congress was held at Prague on May 23–May 25, 1929, but officially reunited only delegates from Austria, Czechoslovakia, Estonia, Finland, France, Latvia, Romania, and Switzerland; these unanimously reconfirmed Švehla as Chairman. The Congress was also tinged by controversy: earlier that month, Švehla had spoken at the RSZML to describe agrarianism as embracing class conflict and proposing that the political makeup of Czechoslovakia be refined to give peasants a decisive role; such statements were immediately condemned by a majority of Czechoslovak political journals. A RSZML cadre, Karel Viškovský, spoke during the IAB proceedings to reassure the audience that agrarians still believed in class collaboration; by contrast, the BdL's Franz Spina took the rostrum to note that "peasant parties" stood for a "pure community of economic interests", replacing the nationalist allegiances of past decades.

The closing resolution of 1929 "affirmed the necessity of establishing a peasant party in each country, based on the principles of private property and private initiative. [It] demanded the full equality of treatment for all classes in customs policy, the development of credit and cooperative societies, as well as of vocational training. It ends on this phrase: 'Peasant power will bring about world peace'." That year, membership criteria were introduced. Member or candidate parties were expected to endorse agricultural cooperatives, pledge themselves to protecting smallholding, and support the peaceful resolution of international conflicts. By 1932, Paris was home to another "Green International", which, despite the name, was a network of pacifists, "supporting, confronting, publicizing and uniting as one fraternal vision all movements working to organize peace across the world."

Also in 1929, the Krestintern's activities were toned down by Joseph Stalin. The Soviet regime ended in bloodshed its attempt to reach out to the peasantry, inaugurating "Dekulakization". During this process, agrarian theorist Alexander Chayanov was arrested on various charges of treason, including allegations that he had kept in contact with the IAB and with Chernov. A new IAB Congress was held in Prague in October–November 1930; delegates represented the Czechoslovak parties and Swiss parties, the BZNS, PAPF, PB, PNȚ, the Latvian Farmers' Union, and the Agrarian Party of Greece. The core topic for discussion was the Great Depression. In greeting his foreign colleagues, Hodža supported price controls at an international level.

=== Dissolution ===
Historians Eduard Kubů and Jiří Šouša view the reincarnated IAB as not fully measuring up to its mission: "the scope its action did not exceed the area of professional consolidation and information exchange. [...] As an alternative foreign policy field of the Czechoslovak agrarian movement, it failed." According to French syndicalist Émile Guillaumin, the old Green International continued to exist in Prague in 1932, having established "branches in Nordic and Danubian countries, as well as in Switzerland"; PAPF was its westernmost member, as well as that region's "most active". As noted by economist Paul Bastid, the regulation of wheat prices, as advocated by the IAB and the Bloc of Agrarian Counties, was detrimental to the interest of French peasants, who needed to "calmly analyze" their international commitments. The IAB briefly extended into other countries, enlisting the Belgian Agricultural League of Wallonia; while Greek Agrarianists were no longer IAB members in 1931, the Spanish Agrarian Party (PAE) joined in 1934.

Agrarian initiatives were sabotaged from 1933 by Nazi Germany, whose leadership viewed the entirety of Central Europe as a German Lebensraum. The Bloc of Agrarian Countries held its last conference in Bucharest in June 1933, after which it faded away due to the hostility of great powers and a lack of commitment among Polish statesmen. Although Italy participated in the 1931 Grain Conference, which was a triumph for the small agrarian states, its fascist government singled out peasant internationalists as crucial enemies. In 1934, as part of the Italo–German rapprochement, it maneuvered to have Hungary withdraw from the Bloc of Agrarian Countries. In December of the following year, a piece in Corriere della Sera alleged that a continental conspiracy, comprising both the Red and Green Internationals, was set out to destroy Italy, and, through it, "the order of Europe".

The advent of authoritarian and fascist regimes slowly encroached on the IAB, reducing its representation. Green activists recorded the fascization of some peasant parties, describing the Lapua Movement as incompatible with its agenda, and restated that the IAB remained equally opposed to Nazism and Bolshevism. Eventually, democratic agrarianism was shunned in its countries of origin. Following Radić's assassination, the HSS had drifted into radical right-wing politics. The Landbund supported the notion of an Austrian Corporate State, which dissolved it in early 1934. During the same weeks, agrarianist leaders Konstantin Päts (in Estonia) and Kārlis Ulmanis (in Latvia) staged self-coups to set up personal dictatorships, banning all political groups—including their own. These measures were justified as protection against more radical groups: the Vaps Movement and the Pērkonkrusts (see 1934 Latvian coup d'état). In Latvia, an ideological synthesis was performed, transforming the agrarian youth organization, Mazpulki, along quasi-fascist lines.

In November 1934, asked by Romanian Ion Clopoțel if the IAB had been abandoned, Hodža responded: "No. Not at all. However, the terrifying agricultural crisis which has been unfolding over these past three years made our reunions pointless. Please inform Mr Mihalache of my wish to convene the next international bureau in February or March [1935]." Radicalization, meanwhile, was also embraced by the PAPF, who, at the height of the Stavisky Affair, proposed the death penalty by hanging for politicians found guilty of forgery or embezzlement. The group had formed the Front paysan with the conservative Union nationale des syndicats agricoles and the militant Comités de Défense Paysanne, and PAPF's more moderate members left in the 1936 party congress. Though a close collaborator of the PAPF, the PAE remained loyal to the Second Spanish Republic, integrating with a family of "right-wing republicans" which also included CEDA. After years of tacit collaboration with the Romanian left, the PNȚ also dealt a serious blow to the development of democracy by sealing a pact with the fascist Iron Guard ahead of national elections in 1937.

On February 28, 1937, Mečíř attended the Ninth PAPF Congress in Compiègne as the IAB overseer. The RSZML had by then entered its own transition toward the far-right. According to historian Roman Holec, the process had begun with Švehla's death in 1933, and was overseen by his successor Rudolf Beran (noted earlier for his support of the IAB). Its size reduced following the Munich Agreement, Czechoslovakia's "Second Republic" was governed by the Party of National Unity, into which the RSZML was dissolved. Most of its activists, including its leader Beran, had belonged to the nationalist right-wing of agrarianism. The decisive movement in this drift to the right was the German occupation of Czechoslovakia in 1938, after which the IAB was no longer active.

The notion of a Green International centered on anti-fascist policies was embraced in 1939 by the HSS' Vladko Maček, who proposed that such an "agrarian autarky", if properly armed by Britain and France, could function as a bulwark against Nazi Germany. A Croat autonomist, Maček also believed that any such arming needed to be conditioned by a Croat–Yugoslav settlement. From 1940, the effective Nazi hegemony in Continental Europe relocated peasant internationalism to London. The IAB was partly reconstructed as the Fabian Society's East European Discussion Group, frequented by the likes of Milan Gavrilović, Jerzy Kuncewicz, and David Mitrany. This initiative produced in July 1942 an International Agrarian Conference, overseen by Chatham House, during which delegates formally pledged themselves to the Atlantic Charter, while restating support for cooperative farming and introducing calls for a planned economy.

== IPU ==
=== Consolidation ===
Map of countries nominally represented in the IPU. Joined by 1948 Joined by 1950 Joined by 1964 Areas of the Eastern Bloc not represented in the UPU Note: Shaded areas represent regional parties.

Following the King Michael Coup in Romania and the September putsch in Bulgaria, the PNȚ and BZNS could organize legally. Shortly after, party representatives Mihalache and G. M. Dimitrov announced that they intended to restore a Green International. Their project was put on hold in 1945, when Dimitrov was expelled from Bulgaria by the communist Fatherland Front; from Italy, Dimitrov contacted Stanisław Mikołajczyk and Stanisław Kot of the Polish People's Party (PSL), with whom he discussed plans for an agrarianist counter-offensive in Eastern Europe. Upon moving to the United States in 1946, Dimitrov also obtained pledges from Maček and Gavrilović, who represented the HSS and ZS, respectively, and from Ferenc Nagy of Hungary's Smallholders Party (FK). The IAB was ultimately revived as the International Peasant Union (IPU). It grouped only parties from the Eastern Bloc and the former Baltic states, represented by political exiles to the United States. The constitutive session was held at Washington, D.C., on July 4, 1947, producing the "Independence Day Declaration". This document specifically linked the IPU to the interwar IAB; it also described the IPU as a legitimate representative of the Eastern European peasants, and restated support for the cooperative movement, viewed as a decent alternative to the "red feudalism" of collective farming.

The four founding sections (BZNS, FK, HSS, ZS) were joined by the PNȚ later in 1947—that is, shortly before leaders Maniu and Mihalache were imprisoned in what became known as the "Tămădău Affair". The decision to "participate in all manifestations" of the IPU was taken by Grigore Gafencu. Although estranged from the PNȚ, he contacted its members in the diaspora, arguing that Alexandru Cretzianu had a mandate from Maniu to represent the party in exile; Gafencu was also impressed that the IPU had spontaneously protested against the PNȚ's outlawing. A delegation of the PSL was also admitted in January 1948; six parties were thus represented at the First IPU Congress in May 1948. All these groups made up the original IPU Presidium. Mikołajczyk was elected President, and Dimitrov General Secretary; the four Vice Presidents were Maček (the only IPU leader to have served in the higher echelons of the IAB), Gavrilović, Nagy, and the PNȚ's Augustin Popa. By 1948, the Vice Presidents had been grouped into a Central Committee, and Popa had been replaced by Grigore Niculescu-Buzești.

During the same period, with the revival of Czechoslovak independence, the RSZML found itself unable to organize: indicted as a pro-Nazi organization, it was banned by the National Front of Czechs and Slovaks. As a result, its activists gravitated toward the smaller Democratic Party of Slovakia. Two rival parties claiming to represent the RSZML were formed in Paris and London—respectively led by Josef Černý and Ladislav Feierabend. After a series of failed attempts at merger, Feierabend lost his prestige, and his followers joined Černý's party, which had achieved IPU recognition. Discussions about joining the IPU were then initiated by Martin Hrabík, who was still skeptical about Mikołajczyk's ability to shape Western policies.

The project received initial grants from the United States Department of State and the National Association of Manufacturers, before obtaining stipends from the National Committee for a Free Europe (NCFE) starting in June 1949. The new International continued to view itself as a regional rather than universal body, and, unlike the IAB, never recruited in Western Europe. Here, the IAB economic agenda was also revived by an International Federation of Agricultural Producers. In that context, Maček openly argued that the Eastern-Bloc peasantry was not just a separate social class, but in fact a singular "people", whose values (including traditionalism and religiosity) made it stand apart from all other components of society, while largely distinguishing them from Western counterparts. From 1953, the IPU began publishing Hodža's manuscripts on Central European federalism.

By 1950, the IPU had also taken in delegates from the RSZML, including Černý, who became IPU Vice President. Bohumil Jílek, once a leader of the Czechoslovak Communists, was co-opted as well and, from 1954, was a member of the IPU Secretariat. Also joining in 1948–1950 were the Slovak Democrats, the Albanian League of Peasants, the Estonian Settlers, the Lithuanian Popular Peasants' Union. By 1952, the IPU was also seeking a rapprochement with the FK's national rival, the Hungarian National Peasant Party, whose former Secretary Imre Kovács had escaped to the United States. Like the IAB, the IPU had problems obtaining support from the Ukrainian diaspora. The contentious issue was its apparent endorsement of the territorial status quo. As noted in 1953 by Yaroslav Stetsko of the Anti-Bolshevik Bloc of Nations, "whoever sympathizes with the 'Green International', is sympathizing with an indivisible Russian Empire." Roman Smal-Stotskyi's Ukrainian Agrarian Party finally joined the IPU in 1964. The IPU was never interested in representing the agrarian anti-communists of East Germany. An affiliate magazine, Agrarpolitische Rundschau, was published irregularly in West Germany. Overall, however, postwar Greens remained proudly Germanophobic, as noted by the PSL's Stanisław Wójcik in 1954.

Despite being ideologically linked to Eastern European agrarianism, IPU leaders maintained a working relationship with France's National Centre of Independents and Peasants, as well as with Italy's Christian Democracy and Coldiretti, and established contacts in Latin America, as well as in South and East Asia. IPU congresses were reportedly attended by peasant delegates from Taiwan. From 1948, the Greens declared European federalism as an ultimate goal of anti-Soviet policies. IPU sections were still organized in Western Europe; however, the IPU was mired by financial difficulties, and by 1954 was forced to contain its outreach efforts—particularly so under Democratic administrations, which reduced federal grants for anti-communist groups.

=== Decline ===
Overall, the IPU was effectively powerless in opposing communism, as membership remained symbolic, and entirely cut off from the source countries. In their countries of origin, all participating groups were depicted using lines of criticism first tested by the Krestintern, as "pro-fascist, bourgeois, and counterrevolutionary". State propaganda consistently accused the IPU branches of having collaborated with Nazism—charges which, as noted by scholar Miguel Cabo, were almost universally groundless. The IPU's own propaganda works highlighted Nazi and communist state terrorism as used against Nikola Petkov, Wincenty Witos, and other "peasant martyrs for democracy". Soon after being set up, the group began a large-scale awareness campaign about the status of peasants in communist countries. One of its memorandums was drafted for the United Nations Security Council in April 1948, but went unheard due to being vetoed by the Soviet delegation.

From 1952, the Czechoslovak Socialist Republic staged a clampdown against alleged "Green International" cells led by Antonín Chloupek, Josef Kepka, Josef Kostohryz, Vilém Knebort, and Otakar Čapek—the accused were not RSZML members, though most had a background in Beran's Party of National Unity. Kostohryz was indicted for having co-signed a 1949 Memorandum calling for a Western intervention in Czechoslovakia. The prosecution fabricated charges according to which the group were all IPU infiltrators, who wished to dilute Czechoslovak sovereignty into a "European Federation" and an "agrarian colony of the USA." Caving in during the interrogations, Kepka supported this claim, noting that the Greens wished "to create a federal state of 100 million inhabitants", in accordance with Hodža's interwar blueprints. At the end of a show trial, Kepka received the death penalty, while Chloupek and others were sentenced to life in prison. A wave of trials for similar charges resulted in charges for other alleged IPU cells. The prosecution obtained more minor sentences for two former RSZML leaders, Josef Dufek and František Machník—though neither had been politically active after 1948. Sentences were revised during the following decade of De-Stalinization, when the regime acknowledged that confessions were obtained under torture. A smaller trial occurred in the People's Republic of Bulgaria following the September 1954 abduction of two political exiles in Austria, Petar Penev Trifonov and Milorad Mladenov. Both were made to confess that they had left Austria voluntarily, as they "grew disgusted of serving the National Bulgarian Committee, a propaganda organ of the United States, and the 'Green International', which is also subsidized from American coffers."

According to IPU communiques, the cases of Petkov, Maniu and Béla Kovács showed that "peasant movements are main obstacles in the path of Soviet imperialism." The Greens also criticized the Bulgarian regime for its reclamation of Stamboliyski as a cult figure, noting that such practices glossed over his anti-communism. The Greens' agenda was mainly focused on criticizing Western politicians who talked of deescalating tensions with the Soviet Union, referring to such an agenda as "appeasement". Mikołajczyk took on the mission of reminding Westerners about historical issues that the Soviet government had either obscured or denied, including the Molotov–Ribbentrop Pact and the Katyn massacre, while Nagy popularized "totalitarianism" as an umbrella term for both fascism and communism. David Mitrany and other IPU intellectuals dedicated much study to Marxism's take on agrarian questions, concluding that peasants and Marxists were forever incompatible. This development, Cabo argues, signaled that the Greens were no longer searching for a "Third Way", but rather folded into a standard capitalist vision; the IPU reserved some praise for Nordic agrarianism and highlighted the progress of mechanized agriculture in the West, but refrained from advancing any specific model for future development.

The organization was weakened from within by a conflict between Mikołajczyk and Dimitrov, which flared up as early as 1953 and required arbitration by the NCFE. Erupting shortly after, the Hungarian Revolution lifted hopes of defeating communism, but apathy followed in the wake of its defeat; at the time, American politicians began avoiding the IPU, which they now saw as inefficient. In 1964, following renewed disputes with other IPU leaders, and a decline of his health, Mikołajczyk resigned and Nagy became the IP President; by then, the central office had moved to New York City. The organization remained centered on the Eastern Seaboard, which hosted eight of its nine congresses, down to its last, held in New York City in 1969. Its final activities were directed at condemning the Warsaw Pact invasion of Czechoslovakia and honoring Jan Palach's memory. In 1970, an IPU executive officer, Robert Bohuslav Soumar, deposed a wreath at the Palach Statue in Rome; he also directed the effort to erect a monument to Palach in the West, resulting in the 1973 installation of a sculpture inside Cleveland Public Library.

Despite his efforts to restore the IPU's prestige, Nagy was unable to prevent its demise. Under his watch, high-ranking figures such as Černý, Popa, and Jozef Lettrich no longer made an effort to attend meetings, and "IPU activity was more or less driven only by Bulgarians and Poles." In 1971 the IPU had closed down its bulletin, as well as its offices in New York, though announcing that it remained nominally active from Washington. It is presumed to have been entirely inactive after that moment, though attempts to revive it were made in 1978 and 1986. With the advent of relative liberalization ("Goulash Communism") in the Hungarian People's Republic, Nagy contemplated abandoning his political exile and returning home. He was still undecided at the moment of his death in 1979.

== Political symbolism ==
Despite commonplace reference to the "Green International" and its "green banner", that political color was not officially adopted by the organization. In its original, Stamboliyskian incarnation, international agrarianism was visually associated with the color orange. This paradox was noted in 1921 by Albert Londres, according to whom "the Green International has an orange banner". The color was chosen early on to represent "ripe wheat fields", lending its name to the "Orange Guard"; it endured as the main component of BZNS flags until the 1940s, when green was added. Scholar Fabien Conord notes of the IAB (which "historians commonly designate [as] the 'Green International'"): "The color does not in fact show up on the organization's bulletin, whose successive editors never make a point of using the term 'green' in their discourse". However, the Bureau began popularizing the four-leaf clover, usually green, as a universal agrarian symbol.

In 1927, upon being convened by Jan Dąbski, the Polish People's Party used red flags with the IAB logo as the agrarian banner. Both fell into disfavor by 1931, when the party adopted ears of wheat on green as the banner, while still using clovers on member badges. Also in 1931, the PNȚ's newspaper Țara de Mâine informed its readers that "the symbolic color of peasant (or agrarian, agricultural etc.) parties is green." In 1937, Romanian fascist Ion Valeriu Emilian pointed to Mihalache's usage of green flags as a direct homage to the IAB—which, according to Emilian, also stood for a "communist orientation", being "created by the Jews to undermine the unity of Christian nations." The PAPF had been using a green flag with the French tricolor in canton. It popularized green flags and armbands, which appeared during demonstrations in Beauvais (1929) and Chartres (1933), but used as its main symbol the pitchfork, selected for its revolutionary connotations.

Other IAB members also chose clovers, though not always from the same source: a four-leaf clover, adopted by Latvian agrarianists in 1929, was a direct reference to the 4-H movement in the United States; it was displayed on green-and-white flags. A variant (gold on green) was also used in Romania, and seen for instance at a PNȚ rally in 1936, while another one showed up in Czechoslovakia as the main emblem of the RSZML. The four-leaf clover was to be finally selected as the IPU logo.

Green banners associated with IAB members
Banner of the Farmers' League

French Agrarian and Peasant Party flag

Mazpulki flag

Banner used in World War II by the Polish People's Party Bataliony Chłopskie
