= Charles Moser =

Charles Moser may refer to:

- Charles Kroth Moser (1877–1968), American novelist, journalist, and U.S. Consul to foreign nations
- Chuck Moser (1918–1995), American football coach
- Charles Arthur Moser (1935–2006), American literary critic and political activist
- Charles Allen Moser (born 1952), American physician and sexologist
