= White International =

Anti-Bolshevik monarchist plot after WWI collapse

The White International was a proposed plan to establish an international reactionary-monarchist organisation in the aftermath of World War I. It was characterised by anti-Bolshevik positions, opposition to the Entente powers, and alignment with right-wing and traditionalist ideologies. The initiative aimed to create a coordinated counter-revolutionary movement in response to the German revolution of 1918–1919, the Russian Revolution, and the Dissolution of Austria-Hungary. Its objectives included the restoration of monarchies under the Hohenzollern, Habsburg-Lorraine, Wittelsbach, and Romanov dynasties, as well as the suppression of liberal democratic and communist revolutionary movements. The project also opposed the emerging political order in Central Europe and Eastern Europe that was being shaped during the Paris Peace Conference (1919–1920).

The project also aspired to renew traditionalist political movements by proposing alternative reforms to monarchical institutions. These proposals rejected the legacy of Enlightened absolutism and advocated a more decentralised German Empire, limiting Protestant Prussian dominance in favour of greater autonomy for Catholic Southern Germany. This vision included a confederation with the Habsburg Danubian Crowns, with the restoration of institutions such as the Bohemian Estates and the Transylvanian Diet, and the removal of policies of Centralisation, Germanisation, and Magyarization. In the case of Russia, the plan envisaged a restored Russian Empire with representative institutions, such as the Zemsky Sobor or Ukrainian hetmanates, intended to moderate Tsarist autocracy and Russification.

== Background ==
Europe before and after the fall of the three empires

During World War I, the Russian Empire entered a period of crisis that culminated in the Abdication of Nicholas II and the establishment of the Russian Republic. These developments provoked opposition among Russian monarchists, some of whom began plotting the restoration of the Romanov dynasty, including the consideration of seeking assistance from forces associated with the Central Powers intervention in the Russian Civil War, particularly the Freikorps in the Baltic. At the same time, the defeat of the Central Powers generated a series of social and economic crises that contributed to anti-monarchical and revolutionary sentiment in the German Empire and the Austro-Hungarian Empire. In the latter case, these pressures were compounded by multi-ethnic tensions and nationalist movements.

By late 1918, these developments resulted in the Abdication of Wilhelm II and the establishment of the Weimar Republic, as well as the proclamation of the Republic of German-Austria, which also exiled the Habsburg dynasty. In early 1919, the collapse of the Russian, German, and Austro-Hungarian empires contributed to an atmosphere marked by Civil war and Extremism, with near-Anarchy conditions in several societies. During this period, prominent figures associated with the far left, such as Béla Kun of the Hungarian Soviet Republic and Rosa Luxemburg of the Spartacus League, rose to prominence. These developments heightened concern among right-wing groups about the potential radicalisation of social democratic governments, such as Karl Renner's Austria and Friedrich Ebert's Germany. These fears were further intensified by Vladimir Lenin's calls for a Marxist World revolution and the Soviet westward offensive of 1918–1919, which sought to establish direct contact between Russian Bolsheviks and revolutionary movements in Germany.

In this context, pro-Hohenzollern German monarchists relocated to East Prussia, which at the time lay outside effective control of the Weimar Republic, and formed the Ostpreußischer Heimatbund (East Prussian Home League). The group planned to use the Baltic port of Königsberg as a base for operations aimed at overthrowing the Berlin government led by Gustav Noske. These objectives were publicly framed as efforts to repel Bolshevism and strengthen national unity, drawing on widespread hostility toward the Communist Party of Germany's attempted uprisings, including among moderate left-wing groups.

Meanwhile, the Allies of World War I, led by liberal major powers such as the British Empire, the French Third Republic, and the United States, viewed the situation in Central Europe as an opportunity to promote a new political order based on Liberal democracy and the Nation state. To this end, the Entente supported national movements, including Czechoslovakia, the State of Slovenes, Croats and Serbs, and the Second Polish Republic, as well as moderate revolutionary parties such as the social democrats. This approach marginalised monarchical representative institutions, which were widely blamed for the outbreak of the war and viewed as incompatible with the political reconstruction of the defeated states.

Amid these conditions of political instability and marginalisation, conservative and royalist forces in Germany, Austria, and Hungary increasingly adopted extremist positions. These trends were reinforced by reports that the Paris Peace Conference (1919–1920) intended to impose punitive peace terms on the defeated Central Powers. In Russia, illiberal and nationalist factions of the White movement, distrustful of the Allied intervention in the Russian Civil War, sought assistance from the Imperial German Army and the Austro-Hungarian Army, which had occupied parts of Eastern Europe following the Treaty of Brest-Litovsk. Shared ideological positions between these groups and far-right Russian legitimists facilitated cooperation.

== History ==
During the German revolution of 1918–1919, significant segments of the German Army refused to serve the government of the Weimar Republic established under Friedrich Ebert. Many within these circles accused the Social Democratic Party of Germany of betraying the nation, particularly because of its acceptance of the Treaty of Versailles, which was widely regarded as humiliating. The abolition of the monarchy was also viewed by these groups as illegitimate, with Wilhelm II and other German princes still considered the rightful rulers.

A turning point within the Reichswehr occurred in January 1920 with the Demilitarisation of the Freikorps in the Baltic. This step was taken to comply with Entente demands to limit the German Army to 100,000 men. Many right-wing and monarchist circles regarded this as a further betrayal, arguing that irregular paramilitary units should not be included in the troop limit. These developments reinforced the belief among sections of the right wing that Berlin had become an Anglo-French proxy and that the Weimar Republic could not be trusted to pursue nationalist objectives. As a result, numerous Freikorps units joined monarchist and traditionalist circles opposed to the republic.

By January 1920, exchanges of information and resources during the Russian Civil War among Habsburg legitimists, German monarchists—particularly elements of the Freikorps—and Russian White forces contributed to the emergence of an informal intelligence network linking reactionary groups from the former empires. Within this network, a set of common objectives was articulated against revolutionary movements:

- The formation of a transnational league involving the Kingdom of Bavaria, Austria, and the Kingdom of Hungary to seek the annulment of the Paris peace treaties, notably the Treaty of Versailles and the Treaty of Trianon, through coordinated paramilitary action.
- The suppression of Bolshevism and all Marxist movements allied with it, including the Bavarian Soviet Republic and the Hungarian Soviet Republic, across Europe.
- The dismantling of Entente-backed successor states and the declaration of war on the Entente, drawing on the traditions of the League of the Three Emperors and the Holy Alliance in opposition to nationalist revolutions.
- A territorial reorganisation involving a Political union between Hohenzollern Germany and Habsburg Austria to establish a Großdeutschland (Greater Germany), confederated with the Kingdom of Hungary and a Baltic Duchy within a proposed Danubian Federation. In parallel, the Russian Empire would confederate with the Kingdom of Finland, the Kingdom of Poland, and the Ukrainian Hetmanate.
- The restoration of traditional monarchy in the former empires, with the exclusion of liberal and constitutional systems, while avoiding a return to Absolute monarchy. Instead, proposals envisaged alternative institutional reforms influenced by Medieval philosophy, customary law, corporatist representation, and degrees of polyarchic autonomy for minorities.
- The extension of the coalition to other royalist and Counter-revolutionary movements across Eurasia, including Italian royalists, Spanish Carlists, Portuguese Miguelists, Chinese legitimists, Iranian monarchists, and Ottoman loyalists. The long-term aim was to isolate the Entente internationally and encourage Reactionary uprisings against regimes such as the French Third Republic and, eventually, the British monarchy.

Key figures associated with this reactionary network included Erich von Ludendorff, Max Bauer, and Ignaz Trebitsch-Lincoln. The plot was reportedly developed in Rosenheim with the participation of a wider circle of counter-revolutionary actors, including Miklós Horthy, Vasily Biskupsky, Pavel Bermondt-Avalov, Gustav Ritter von Kahr, Hermann Ehrhardt, Waldemar Pabst, Rüdiger von der Goltz, Josef Bischoff, Max Hoffmann, Wolfgang Kapp, Franz von Stephani, Georg Escherich, and Georg Heim.

German monarchists in East Prussia and in exile increasingly viewed the Freikorps as a force that could be deployed both outside Germany and within its borders against the Weimar government. However, they often distrusted Prussian nationalists, whom they regarded as influenced by Enlightenment and Romantic ideas. These critics blamed what they termed "bourgeois values" for the failure of the Kapp Putsch, a right-wing coup attempt, and instead favoured the Bavarian monarchists, whom they saw as more closely aligned with Traditional values through Catholic integralism. At the same time, the Weimar authorities regarded the presence of approximately 150,000 Russian internees in and around Berlin—many of whom were developing links with German dissidents—as a potential security risk.

The Kapp Putsch disaster of mid-March 1920 served as the ultimate example of how not to orchestrate a coup d'état. Such lessons were all to appear in the next phase of the conspirators' ceaseless endeavours at counter-revolution: the Rosenheim plan. One lesson was that the decisive strike could not come from the Prussians, whom Bauer now blamed as being tainted by 'Jewish socialism and bourgeois values'. The Reichswehr too had proven their unreliability in Defence Minister General Noske's refusal to support the Freikorps units with regular troops. Bauer was also convinced that it had been a mistake to attempt to set up a civilian government that did not have the courage to trust in the Freikorps component that had marched on Berlin to do the job. In fact, Bauer was now certain that the enterprise had failed not because it was too radical but because it was not radical enough; and his next plan would reflect this judgement. It was for this reason that the Ludendorff circle, especially the group around Colonel Bauer, sought and was granted exile in the rightist-friendly atmosphere of Bavaria after the failure of the Kapp Putsch; and it was here that the Rosenheim plan was conceived.

— Nicholas Alforde

Following the failure of the Kapp Putsch, Erich von Ludendorff continued efforts to overthrow the Weimar Republic. He sought to link German domestic opposition with similar movements in neighbouring countries, hoping to secure external assistance and potentially restore elements of Germany's former Sphere of influence. To this end, Ludendorff compiled a list of political actors opposed to republican systems and the Entente, including members of the White Russian émigré community in Germany, the Bavarian Minister-President Gustav von Kahr, and political figures in Austria, Hungary, and Italy.

At the same time, the Russian monarchist leader Vasily Biskupsky established political networks among the White émigré community, pursuing parallel conspiracies against Soviet Russia. Biskupsky developed close contacts with the German extreme right through his involvement in the Berlin-based National Union (Nationale Vereinigung or NV), founded by Freikorps leader Major Waldemar Pabst. The NV brought together industrialists, journalists, senior officials, monarchists from the Russian émigré community, and several émigré Baltic Germans. Many within this circle were also connected to Ludendorff's counter-revolutionary network, which included his close adviser Max Bauer. Bauer is frequently described as the principal intellectual architect of the Rosenheim Plan and a key driving force behind the White International project, particularly for his role in identifying shared grievances across diverse groups.

Through Bauer, figures such as the Hungarian-born Ignatius Trebitsch-Lincoln and Freikorps commander Major Franz von Stephani joined the plot, with von Stephani acting as an intermediary between Bavarian and Prussian monarchists, including through advocacy of Federalism. The Bavarian government under Gustav von Kahr appeared to be a promising ally, and the Einwohnerwehr was identified as a potential organisational core and successor to the dissolved NV. Bauer, Trebitsch-Lincoln, and von Stephani subsequently relocated south of Munich, where many right-wing political exiles had settled, and began developing a new coup plan with the support of the Bavarian People's Party, Hungarian conservatives, and elements of the White Russian diaspora.

In May 1920, a secret meeting in Regensburg between representatives of the Bavarian People's Party and around 60 Freikorps units agreed that paramilitary groups across Germany with reactionary orientations would recognise the Organisation Escherich (Orgesch) as their coordinating body. Shortly thereafter, Bauer and Trebitsch-Lincoln met with leading figures from the Russian émigré community in Munich, establishing contacts with Vasily Biskupsky and soldiers associated with Pavel Bermondt-Avalov.

Colonel Bauer, Trebitsch-Lincoln and Major von Stephani resettled south of Munich in Garmisch-Partenkirchen and wasted no time in formulating a new plan, more ambitious than anything heretofore. It called for the creation of an international 'white alliance' of all vanquished nations, whose goal would be the destruction of all so-called socialist regimes and the annulment of the treaties of Paris by force of arms, as mentioned above. The plot devised in Rosenheim, where General Ludendorff had taken up residence, was approved by the general and then presented to the new Bavarian Minister-President, Gustav von Kahr, and his government dominated by the Bayerische Volkspartei (BVP; Bavarian People's Party), which had replaced that of moderate socialist Johannes Hoffmann in the wake of the Kapp fiasco (...) The Regensburg Meeting of May 1920 and the creation of Orgesch, coupled with the enthusiasm of certain émigré Russians and Baltic Germans, marked the first milestones in the realization of the Rosenheim plan. Relations between the Bavarian right and the Ludendorff group were not closely defined at this point. There remained areas of disagreement that would surface later. For the time being, however, Colonel Bauer, Trebitsch-Lincoln and their co-conspirators were ready to move on to the next phase in the establishment of the White International. Securing travel passes in false names provided them by both the Munich Police Chief and the Hungarian Consulate, Colonel Bauer, his private secretary and Trebitsch-Lincoln passed over the border into Austria and then on to Budapest to set up their central base of operations with the help of Admiral Horthy, or so they hoped.

— Nicholas Alforde

Following meetings in Munich, the Ludendorff circle dispatched Max Bauer to Budapest on 05-15-1920 with the aim of inviting Miklós Horthy to participate in the formation of a multinational counter-revolutionary organisation referred to as the "International White". Hungary was viewed as a key potential ally because of the relative stability of the Hungarian Regency, its leadership's anti-communist stance, and Hungary's interest in revising the Treaty of Trianon. Horthy reportedly expressed agreement with the plan and hoped that a coordinated anti-Bolshevik alliance might gain approval from the Entente and lead to more favourable territorial outcomes for Hungary.

During these discussions, German representatives presented the Hungarians with a military proposal known as the Rosenheim Plan, which envisaged the following elements:

- The deployment of German Freikorps disguised as Hungarian settlers to support a two-front invasion of Austria from Hungary, diverting defences while German forces from Bavaria advanced, restoring the Habsburg monarchy and suppressing Karl Renner's Social Democratic Party of Austria.
- A coordinated invasion of Czechoslovakia from Southern Germany and Hungary, followed by an advance on Berlin involving forces from northern Germany, White émigré units, and allied paramilitaries, with the aim of overthrowing the Weimar Republic and establishing a regency under Ludendorff.
- A subsequent multinational expedition to invade Poland, advance on Moscow, and restore the House of Romanov, accompanied by territorial adjustments involving the United Baltic Duchy and East Prussia.
- A final phase involving the division of Entente-backed successor states among the participating powers and a declaration of war against the Allies of World War I to overturn the postwar settlement of the Paris Peace Conference (1919–1920).

By mid-1920, an extensive network of reactionary groups had taken shape in Budapest and Munich. Financing was expected to come from German industrialists, Hungarian state funds, and the circulation of counterfeit Russian Duma roubles. The strategy relied heavily on Guerrilla warfare and paramilitary action rather than regular armies, drawing inspiration from the recent rise of Miklós Horthy in Hungary, which had depended on radical paramilitary forces rather than the Royal Hungarian Honvéd.

The signing of the Versailles Treaty was also the event that moved future Kapp Putsch organizer and White International plot creator Colonel Bauer to the forefront of counter-revolutionary activity. For Bauer it was simple: from this point on, his goal was the annulment of the Versailles Treaty and the removal of the Weimar Republic. He judged the treaty to be 'a noose placed round our throats which they hope to pull closed', and a mindless expression of power politics. Frustrated by the hesitancy of the army and generally reluctant to believe that meticulous preparation was necessary, Bauer put his complete trust—misplaced, as it turned out—in the Freikorps units and excluded the Reichswehr from his plans before and after the Kapp fiasco. In fact, in the military component of Bauer's plan for the White International, there was no specific role mentioned for the armed forces of any of the countries involved.

— Nicholas Alforde

Despite early support from Hungarian and Russian circles and sympathies in Bavaria and Austria, internal divisions emerged by August 1920. Commitment to the Ludendorff circle was often conditional, with participants supporting the project only insofar as it served their immediate interests. Factors such as Bavarian separatism, parliamentarian sentiment in Austria, and pro-Entente positions among some White Russian and Hungarian factions undermined cohesion. Italian reactionaries declined to participate, while Horthy's government and Russian émigré leaders increasingly pursued alternative diplomatic options, including contacts with France, in response to shifting conditions in Eastern Europe.

The project effectively collapsed in mid-September 1920, when Ignaz Trebitsch-Lincoln disclosed confidential White International documents to the Entente at the French legation in Vienna, reportedly in exchange for personal protection.

== Failure of the plot ==
One of the principal weaknesses of the project was its ambitious international scope. National priorities among the participating groups frequently outweighed commitments to transnational cooperation. Representatives from the Kingdom of Hungary and the Kingdom of Bavaria, for example, were already pursuing treaty revision through tentative rapprochement with the Entente and sought inclusion within a new European order promoted by the victorious powers. Bavarian actors pursued their own agenda, including proposals for confederation with Austria and the creation of a southern German Catholic state, while Hungarian leaders prioritised the recovery of Burgenland from Austria.

Similarly, factions within the White Russian camp tended to favour French support over German assistance, owing to France's greater economic and diplomatic resources and to concerns over German ambitions in the Baltikum. These groups were also reluctant to recognise entities such as the Ukrainian State or the Kingdom of Lithuania. As a result, many participants in the proposed White International pursued bilateral diplomatic opportunities to advance their immediate national interests—including negotiations with the Entente—while only nominally supporting the multinational objectives outlined in the Rosenheim Plan.

Munich's approach in its independent foreign policy was thus particularist, and in some circles even separatist, as well as being Francophile and patently anti-Prussian. Bavaria played the anti-Prussian card to ingratiate itself with the French who, in the opinion of BVP leader Georg Heim, would rather see a weak confederation of Germany than a strong, Berlin-based federation. The key issues regarding Bavaria's negotiations with France were the pending disarmament order and the proposed Anschluß between the two Catholic states of Bavaria and Austria, leaving Prussia and the rest of Germany out of the equation entirely. The Bavarian overtures to France serve as the first example of one of the problems which would plague the plotters: the practice of White International partners negotiating with outside powers not included within their ranks. (...) What Horthy, especially his legitimist-oriented Foreign Ministry, did not tell Bauer was that negotiations with France had been in progress since January 1920 concerning economic concessions in exchange for French support for territorial revisions of the soon-to-be-signed Treaty of Trianon. Thus during the summer of 1920, the Hungarians played a double game of going through the motions of support for Bauer's White International scheme while being equally active in talks with the sworn enemies of Ludendorff's emissaries. (...) Such was also the case with the Austrians. The initial goal of the plan was the removal of the 'socialist' Renner government in Vienna by coordinated military incursions of Hungarian troops and Bavarian Freikorps units who had recently been placed under the overall command of Georg Escherich at the Regensburg Meeting. The Austrian extreme right was willing to allow this, as long as it seemed necessary. By August, however, strong indications that the Renner government would lose its parliamentary majority in favour of a conservative coalition at the polls prompted the Austrian right to rethink their collaboration with the Bavarian Orgesch, and they decided to withdraw from the whole affair. Constitutional processes had thus made moot one of the chief reasons for the very existence of the White International. The Russian connection unravelled in a similar fashion. It lasted only until General Biskupsky was summarily rebuffed by White Russian General Wrangel, then fighting in southern Russia. After receiving promises of support from France, General Wrangel refused to recognize the authority of the Budapest Russian Committee of the White International.

— Nicholas Alforde

Another factor contributing to the project's failure, acknowledged by its own proponents, was the limited effectiveness of the paramilitary forces on which it relied. Many of these units were untested or poorly coordinated and were unlikely to match the regular armies of the successor states or the forces of the Entente. The Reichswehr declined to participate without extensive preparation, which conflicted with the plotters' emphasis on rapid action. As a result, the less disciplined Freikorps assumed a central role, further undermining operational reliability.

The plan also faced serious logistical and financial difficulties. German–White Russian cooperation depended on resources that were largely unavailable, leading the conspirators to resort to printing their own currency. This highlighted broader logistical shortcomings, compounded by the volatile political environment, frequent changes of government, and shifting military situations across the region. These conditions left little opportunity for sustained planning or coordination.

There were also significant ideological divisions. At an early stage, some conspirators reportedly considered reaching out to elements of the German far left, including Bolsheviks then active in Berlin, on the basis of shared hostility toward social democratic and liberal democratic governments in Germany and Austria. This idea, sometimes viewed retrospectively as a precursor to National Bolshevik concepts, was ultimately abandoned because of mutual distrust and ideological incompatibility. Nevertheless, it underscored a recognition that the Working class would play a decisive role in any political transformation, raising unresolved questions about the need for a coherent social programme. Divergent views on these issues further weakened cohesion within the Ludendorff circle and contributed to internal disagreements and defections among its allies.

== Aftermath ==
Despite the disintegration of the plot following the betrayal by Ignaz Trebitsch-Lincoln, contacts between Austro-Bavarian right-wing politicians and the Hungarian Regency were nevertheless maintained, and attempts were made to develop new initiatives. In the spring of 1922, Hungarian Prime Minister István Bethlen sent Miklós Kozma to Munich to renew relations between monarchist circles in the two regions, which had cooled after the failure of the White Internationale project. Figures such as Gustav von Kahr, Erich von Ludendorff, and a young Adolf Hitler expressed interest in renewed cooperation. Kozma reportedly suggested to Ludendorff that Hungarian government circles might purchase weapons from Germany, thereby providing economic assistance. Ludendorff, however, whose political influence had declined by this time, argued that deep divisions among Bavarian right-wing politicians made meaningful agreement unlikely.

Following these discussions, Kozma and Gyula Gömbös informed Bethlen that sustained cooperation between German and Hungarian reactionary circles was impracticable and should be suspended, despite protests from Colonel Tihamér Siménfalvy, leader of the far-right Double Cross Blood Union, who favoured maintaining close ties with Bavarian and Austrian extremist movements. Further efforts to promote international cooperation among European far-right groups emerged at the 1920 international antisemitic congress in Vienna. These initiatives met with limited support: only the Association of Awakening Hungarians expressed interest in forming an International Antisemitic League. Bethlen's policy of political consolidation subsequently contributed to a decline in attempts to strengthen cooperation between the Hungarian Regency and German–Austrian monarchist circles.

A final attempt to establish far-right cooperation between Hungarian and German anti-communist groups—grounded more in Ultranationalism than in Traditionalist conservatism or Monarchism—was associated with the so-called Hungarian Beer Hall Putsch. This plan was proposed by Friedrich Fritz Döhmel, a representative of the Hitler–Ludendorff-aligned Bavarian National Socialist movement and its allied paramilitary organisation, the Kampfbund, to Gyula Gömbös, Ferenc Ulain, and Béla Szemere. The scheme targeted Bethlen's government, which was criticised as overly liberal and pro-Entente, but it ultimately failed because it depended on the success of the Nazi Party's attempted coup during the Beer Hall Putsch. At the same time, between 1920 and 1923, Hitler collaborated with the German–White émigré conspiratorial organisation Aufbau (Reconstruction), which emerged from remnants of Ludendorff's White Internationale networks.

Some of the ideologues associated with the plot went on to influence interwar movements with a broadly counter-revolutionary agenda. Many of these movements emerged in territories of the former empires. In Bavaria, for example, the Bund Bayern und Reich advocated a return to traditional corporatist forms of governance rooted in local Landtag institutions, or at minimum the preservation of federalism within the new constitutional framework. While these groups did not uniformly support the racial völkisch nationalism characteristic of parts of the far right, they generally opposed the centralising tendencies and totalitarian aspects of Nazism.

Comparable developments occurred outside Central and Eastern Europe. In Norway, organisations such as Samfundshjelpen (Society Aid) and the Society Guard evolved into a transnational strikebreaking network during the interwar years. This network operated across much of Europe and was sustained through regular conferences, correspondence, and other forms of coordination.

During the 1930s, following the rise of Fascism, some former participants in the White Internationale plot—having abandoned traditionalist and monarchist positions while retaining strong anti-communist and illiberal views—sought to revive elements of international cooperation. These efforts focused on alliances with right-wing factions in Fascist Italy, Austrofascist circles, Nazi movements, and Hungarian fascist groups, which were perceived as having greater prospects for power and international backing, particularly from the Mussolini government. Such initiatives contrasted with the marginalisation of royalist groups and the international isolation of former Royal houses during this period.

These projects ultimately failed. Opposition from left-wing fascist currents and from irredentist factions prioritising national objectives—such as Nazi Germany's pursuit of Anschluss, which conflicted with Austrofascist goals—undermined broader cooperation. The establishment of the Rome–Berlin Axis further rendered such schemes obsolete, as it prioritised strategic and military objectives associated with the New Order and embraced elements of Reactionary modernism rather than rejecting modernity altogether.

== See also ==
- Operation Frühlingssonne
- Russian Civil War
  - 1918 Ukrainian coup d'état
  - Central Powers intervention in the Russian Civil War
  - Finnish Civil War
  - White émigré
- Revolutions and interventions in Hungary (1918–1920)
  - Hungarian–Romanian War
  - Hungarian Republic (1919–1920)
