= Louis Guillon =

French agrarian leader

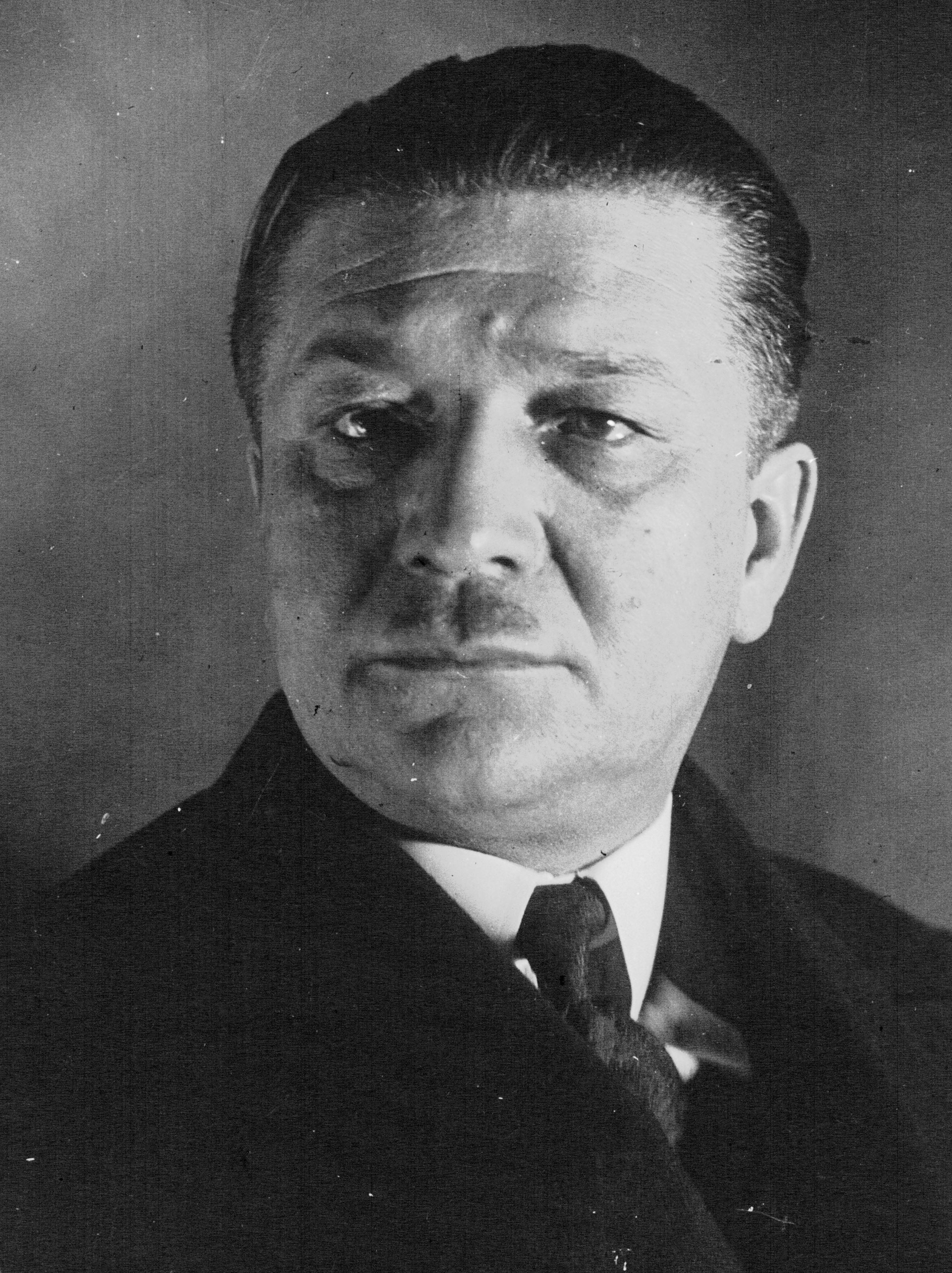

Louis Guillon was a French agrarian leader and deputy for Vosges between 1932 and 1936.

His political career started off in the French Agrarian and Peasant Party (PAPF) which when he was active in it was an agrarian party with eclectic views on both the right and the left. In 1932 he was elected as the only deputy for Vosges.

However in 1934 it moved right and it joined the Front paysan with the activist and radically right wing Comités de défense paysanne and the conservative Union nationale des syndicats agricoles. Initially going along with the radicalization for example at the height of the Stavisky Affair proposing the death penalty by hanging for politicians found guilty of forgery or embezzlement.

This move to the right in 1936 divided the PAPF into two factions, while both were right wing on the French political spectrum, he led the more Republican and centrist faction out of the party and founded the Republican, Social and Agrarian Party (French: Parti républicain agraire et social, PRAS). The more right-wing element remained known as the PAPF and was led by Pierre Mathé (Côte-d'Or).

He also led the small parliamentary technical group in the Chamber of Deputies the Independents of Economic, Social and Peasant Action (French: Indépendants d'action économique, sociale et paysanne, IAESP).

== Sources ==
- Bernet, J (1979), "Un Compiégnois célèbre dans l'entre-deux-guerres : Fleurant Agricola, fondateur du Parti Agraire", Annales historiques compiégnoises modernes et contemporaines, No. 6 1979
- Jolly, Jean (1994), "Louis Guillon", Dictionnaire des parlementaires français 1940 - 1958 tome 3
- Ory, Pascal (1975), "Le dorgérisme, institution et discours d'une colère paysanne (1929-1939)", Revue d'Histoire Moderne et Contemporaine, 22 (2): 168–190, doi:10.3406/rhmc.1975.2416
- Passmore, Kevin (2013), "11 Apogee and Crisis (1928–1932)", The Right in France from the Third Republic to Vichy (online ed.), Oxford: Oxford Academic, doi:10.1093/acprof:oso/9780199658206.003.0004, ISBN 9780191745034
