= Independents of Economic, Social and Peasant Action =

French political group (1932–1936)

The Independents of Economic, Social and Peasant Action (French: Indépendants d'action économique, sociale et paysanne, IAESP) was a small French parliamentary technical group in the Chamber of Deputies of France during the French Third Republic in existence in 1932 and 1936 led by Louis Guillon a deputy for Vosges.

It was a small conservative agrarian group partly composed of members of the French Agrarian and Peasant Party.

== Sources ==
- Bernet, J (1979), "Un Compiégnois célèbre dans l'entre-deux-guerres : Fleurant Agricola, fondateur du Parti Agraire", Annales historiques compiégnoises modernes et contemporaines, No. 6 1979
- Jolly, Jean (1994), "Louis Guillon", Dictionnaire des parlementaires français 1940 - 1958 tome 3
