= Gabriel Fleurant =

French corporatist (??–1936)

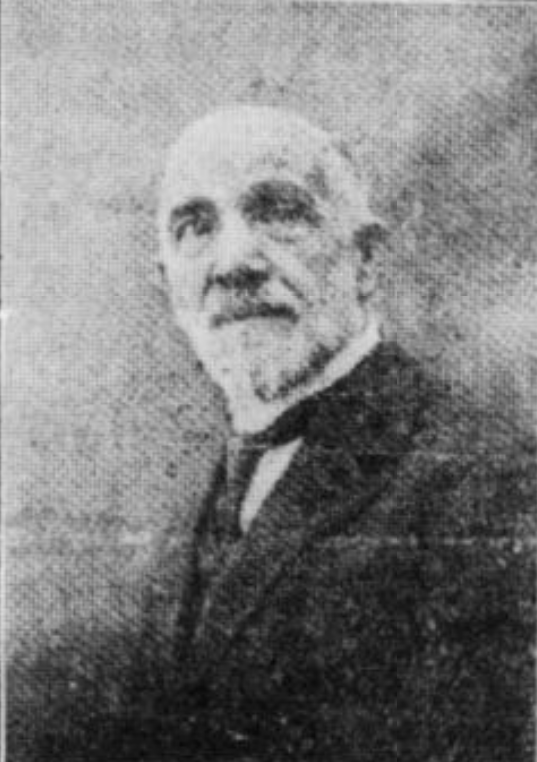
Fleurant in 1933

Gabriel Fleurant (also Gabriel Fleurant-Agricola) d. June 1936 was the founder and leader of the French Agrarian and Peasant Party (French: Parti agraire et paysan français, PAPF), a corporatist, right-wing populist and agrarian party.

He set up a sugar beet producers association in France.

The party was founded after Fleurant visited Eastern Europe, visited existing peasant based parties and was from the start aligned with the International Agrarian Bureau.

In 1934 it joined the Front paysan with the more right wing Comités de défense paysanne and the Union nationale des syndicats agricoles. although it fell apart in 1936 due to differences in political strategy.

== Sources ==
- Bernet, J (1979), "Un Compiégnois célèbre dans l'entre-deux-guerres : Fleurant Agricola, fondateur du Parti Agraire", Annales historiques compiégnoises modernes et contemporaines, No. 6 1979
- Ory, Pascal (1975), Le dorgérisme, institution et discours d'une colère paysanne (1929-1939)
- Passmore, Kevin (2013), The Right in France from the Third Republic to Vichy (online ed.), Oxford: Oxford Academic, doi:10.1093/acprof:oso/9780199658206.003.0004, ISBN 9780191745034
- Paxton, Robert O. (1997-09-26), French Peasant Fascism : Henry Dorgeres' Greenshirts and the Crises of French Agriculture, 1929-1939, Oxford University Press, USA, ISBN 978-0-19-535474-4
