= François de Clermont-Tonnerre (politician) =

French politician (1906–1979)

- Born: François Marie Amédée Joseph de Clermont-Tonnerre; September 19, 1906; Paris, France
- Died: December 2, 1979 (aged 73); Paris, France
- Education: École Nationale des Chartes
- Occupation: Politician
- Political party: French Agrarian and Peasant Party
- Spouse: Charlotte de Rohan-Chabot
- Children: 4
- Parent(s): Louis de Clermont-Tonnerre; Jeanne de Kergorlay

François de Clermont-Tonnerre (French pronunciation: [fʁɑ̃swa də klɛʁmɔ̃ tɔnɛʁ]; 1906–1979) was a French aristocrat and agrarian conservative politician.

== Early life ==
He was born on September 19, 1906, in Paris, France. Both his father, Louis de Clermont-Tonnerre and his mother, Jeanne de Kergorlay, were aristocrats.

He graduated from the École Nationale des Chartes in Paris.

== Career ==
He joined the French Agrarian and Peasant Party, an agrarian conservative political party He served as a member of the Chamber of Deputies for the Somme from 1936 to 1942.

He co-authored Le manifeste paysan: essai d'une doctrine humaniste appliquée à l'agriculture française with Pierre Mathé, published in 1937.

On 10 July 1940, he voted in favour of granting the cabinet presided by Marshal Philippe Pétain authority to draw up a new constitution, thereby effectively ending the French Third Republic and establishing Vichy France. Later, he went to French North Africa and joined the Free French forces. After World War II, he was active in the Rally of the French People (RPF).

== Personal life ==
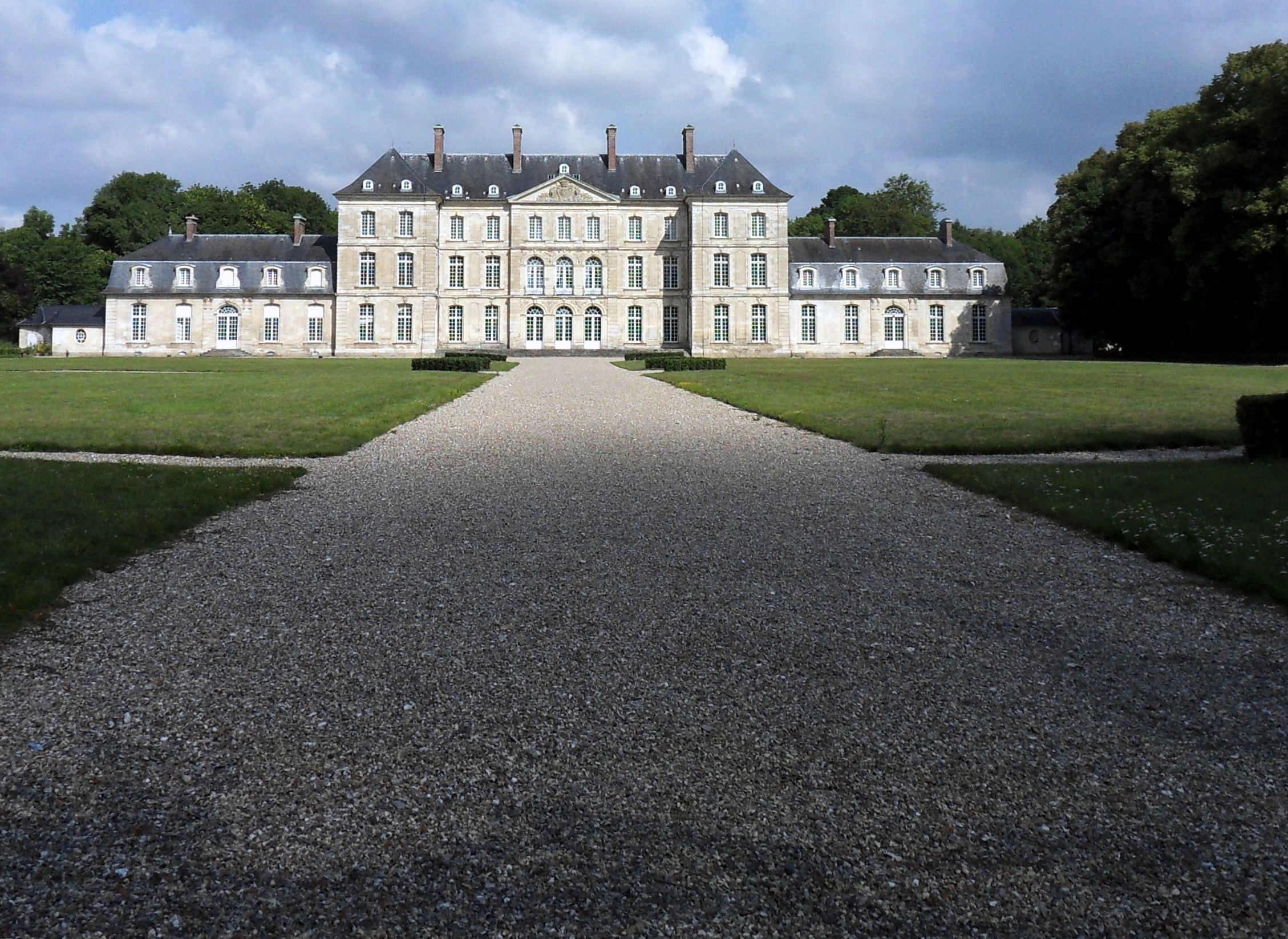
Château de Bertangles.

He married Charlotte de Rohan-Chabot. They had four children. They resided at the Château de Bertangles in Bertangles, Somme.

== Death ==
He died on December 2, 1979, in Paris, France.
