= Leidangen =

Organization for volunteer military education in Norway

Leidangen was an organisation for volunteer military education in Norway. The organisation was started in 1931, and had its background in various 1920s volunteer organisations such as the Society Guard. Leidangen differed from the former, in that Leidangen was integrated fully into Norway's military planning. Its name was derived from the medieval levy Leidang. Leidangen received public support from 1933, including a loan of weaponry, and was subordinated to a committee that was in part appointed by the state. The organisation was dissolved in 1936.
