= Charles Arthur Moser =

American literary critic and political activist (1935–2006)

- Born: 6 January 1935; Knoxville, Tennessee, United States
- Died: 11 December 2006 (aged 71); Sofia, Bulgaria
- Resting place: Cedar Hill Cemetery, Suitland, Prince George's County, Maryland, USA
- Education: Yale University Columbia University; Leningrad University
- Occupations: Literary critic, educator
- Employer(s): Yale University; George Washington University
- Spouse: Anastasia Dimitrova-Moser (m. 1968; death 2006)
- Parent(s): Arthur Hurst Moser (father); Sara Ridlehoover Moser (mother)

Charles Arthur Moser (January 6, 1935 – December 11, 2006) was an American literary critic and political activist. As a literary critic he is known for his interests in Russian and Bulgarian literatures and cultures. His political views are described as conservative.

== Biography ==
Charles Arthur Moser was born in Knoxville, Tennessee, United States, as the son of Arthur Hurst Moser, Professor of Classics at the University of Tennessee and Sara Ridlehoover Moser.

In 1956, Charles Moser earned his B.A. (summa cum laude) in Slavic Languages from Yale University. In 1958 he earned his M.A. in Slavic Languages from Columbia University. The thesis of his 1962 Ph.D. (Columbia University) was "Antinihilism in the Russian Novel of the 1860s".

During 1958-1959 he studied at Leningrad State University, as part of the first graduate student exchange between the United States and the Soviet Union.

After teaching at Yale (1960-1967), he joined the Department of Slavic Languages and Literatures at the George Washington University, where he was chairman during 1969-1974 and 1980–1989.

He founded and cofounded a number of organizations, including University Professors for Academic Order (1970), Committee for a Free Afghanistan, and Freedom League. In 1986 and 1987 President Ronald Reagan nominated Charles Moser for membership on the National Council for the Humanities, however the nominations were rejected by the Senate.

His wife, Anastasia Dimitrova-Moser, was the daughter of Bulgarian politician G. M. Dimitrov. in 1992, after Anastasia Moser was elected General Secretary of the Bulgarian Agrarian Union, the Mosers moved to Sofia, Bulgaria. In the same year, in Bulgaria, Moser founded the Free Initiative Foundation, to promote the transition of Bulgaria to democracy.

== Selected bibliography ==
- — (February 1960). "Mayakovsky's Unsentimental Journeys". The American Slavic and East European Review. 19 (1): 85–100. doi:10.2307/126954. JSTOR 126954.
- — (February 1961). "A Nihilist's Career: S. M. Stepniak-Kravchinskij". The American Slavic and East European Review. 20 (1): 55–71. doi:10.2307/3001245. JSTOR 3001245.
- — (Spring–Summer 1963). "Pisemskij's Literary Protest: An Episode from the Polemics of the 1860's in Russia". Études Slaves et Est-Européennes / Slavic and East-European Studies. 8 (1–2): 60–72. JSTOR 41055820.
- — (Summer 1963). "The Journal Zlatorog and Modern Bulgarian Letters". The Slavic and East European Journal. 7 (2): 117–133. doi:10.2307/304605. JSTOR 304605.
- — (1964). Antinihilism in the Russian Novel of the 1860s. London, Hague and Paris: Mouton & Co.
- — (December 1964). "Dr Krăstyu Krăstev: A Bulgarian Mentor". The Slavonic and East European Review. 43 (100): 130–151. JSTOR 4205612.
- — (Summer 1965). "Antinihilism in Russian Poetry of the 1860's". The Slavic and East European Journal. 9 (2): 155–173. doi:10.2307/304921. JSTOR 304921.
- — (July 1966). "Mayakovsky and America". The Russian Review. 25 (3): 245–256. doi:10.2307/3000877. JSTOR 3000877.
- — (Spring 1967). "The Visionary Realism of Jordan Jovkov". The Slavic and East European Journal. 11 (1): 44–58. doi:10.2307/305501. JSTOR 305501.
- — (Winter 1969). "Russian meždu/mež with the Genitive". The Slavic and East European Journal. 13 (4): 473–478. doi:10.2307/306225. JSTOR 306225.
- — (July 1969). "Korolenko and America". The Russian Review. 28 (3): 303–314. doi:10.2307/127397. JSTOR 127397.
- — (1969). Pisemsky: A Provincial Realist. Cambridge, MA: Harvard University Press. ISBN 978-0-674-66975-8 – via Internet Archive.
- — (March 1971). "Reviewed Work: Romantizmut v Bŭlgarskata Literatura. Krust'o Genov". Slavic Review. 30 (1): 219–220. doi:10.2307/2493528. JSTOR 2493528.
- — (April 1971). "Lomonosov's "Vecherneye razmyshleniye"". The Slavonic and East European Review. 49 (115): 189–199. JSTOR 4206365.
- — (1972). Ivan Turgenev. New York and London: Columbia University Press. ISBN 978-0-231-03412-8 – via Internet Archive.
- — (1972). "Turgenev: The Cosmopolitan Nationalist". In Moser, Charles A. (ed.). Russia: The Spirit of Nationalism. Jamaica, NY: St John University. pp. 56–88 – via Internet Archive.
- — (1972). A History of Bulgarian Literature 865–1944. Berlin, Boston: De Gruyter Mouton. doi:10.1515/9783110810608. ISBN 9783110810608.
- — (December 1972). "Reviewed Work: Istoriia na Bŭlgarskata Literatura. Vol. 3: Bŭlgarskata Literatura ot Osvobozhdenieto (1878) do Kraia na Pŭrvata Svetovna voina. by Pantelei Zarev, Stoian Karolev, Georgi Tsanev". Slavic Review. 31 (4): 932–933. doi:10.2307/2493822. JSTOR 2493822.
- — (1973). "The Problem of the Igor Tale". Canadian-American Slavic Studies. 7 (2): iii-154. doi:10.1163/221023973X00803.
- — (1974). "Why UPAO?; Teaching and Its Evaluation". In Moser, Charles A. (ed.). Continuity in Crisis: The University at Bay. Washington, DC: University Professors for Academic Order, Inc. pp. 15–18, 141–144 – via Internet Archive.
- — (March 1976). "Reviewed Work: Training the Nihilists: Education and Radicalism in Tsarist Russia. Daniel R. Brower". Slavic Review. 35 (1): 129–130. doi:10.2307/2494834. JSTOR 2494834.
- — (Spring 1979). "National Renown and International Reputation: The Case of Ivan Vazov". The Slavic and East European Journal. 23 (1): 87–93. doi:10.2307/307802. JSTOR 307802.
- — (1979). Denis Fonvizin. Boston: Twayne Publishers. pp. xi–xxiv. ISBN 978-0-8057-6402-4 – via Internet Archive.
- — (1979). Dimitrov of Bulgaria: А Political Biography of Dr. Georgi M. Dimitrov. Ottawa, IL.: Caroline House Publishers. ISBN 978-0-89803-011-2 – via Internet Archive.
- — (Summer 1984). "Reviewed Works: Letters by Ivan S. Turgenev, A. V. Knowles; Letters by Ivan S. Turgenev, David Lowe". The Slavic and East European Journal. 28 (2): 260–262. doi:10.2307/307713. JSTOR 307713.
- — (1985). "Toward a Theory of Anti-Communist Insurgency". In Moser, Charles A. (ed.). Combat on Communist Territory. Lake Bluff, IL: The Free Congress Research and Education Foundation, Regnery Gateway, Inc. pp. 190–211. ISBN 0-89526-592-3.
- — (Winter 1985). "Teachers of Russian, the Revolutionary Wave of 1862, and Orthographical Reform". The Slavic and East European Journal. 29 (4): 422–436. doi:10.2307/307463. JSTOR 307463.
- — (1986). "Pushkin and the Russian Short Story". In Moser, Charles A. (ed.). The Russian Short Story: A Critical History. Boston: Twayne Publishers. pp. xi–xxiv. ISBN 978-0-8057-9360-4 – via Internet Archive.
- — (Summer 1988). "TRANSLATION: The Achievement of Constance Garnett". The American Scholar. 57 (3): 431–438. JSTOR 41211554.
- — (1989). Esthetics as Nightmare: Russian Literary Theory 1855-1870. Princeton, NJ: Princeton University Press – via Internet Archive.
- — (Spring 1989). "Reviewed Work: Slavic and East European Arts. Satire Cum Poesis: Three Bulgarian Plays by Yordan Radichkov, Stanislav Stratiev, E. J. Czerwinski". The Slavic and East European Journal. 33 (1): 141–142. doi:10.2307/308404. JSTOR 308404.
- — (July 1989). "Georgi Markov in the 1960s". The Slavonic and East European Review. 67 (3): 357–377. JSTOR 4210027.
- — (1992). "Bibliography". In Moser, Charles A. (ed.). Cambridge History of Russian Literature (2nd ed.). Cambridge: Cambridge University Press. pp. 615–652. doi:10.1017/CHOL9780521415545. ISBN 978-0-521-41554-5 – via Internet Archive.
- — (Spring 1992). "Prince Mirsky: A History". The American Scholar. 61 (2): 260–266. JSTOR 41212012.
- — (1994). Theory and History of the Bulgarian Transition. Sofia: Free Initiative Foundation. ISBN 954-639-002-X.
- Rollberg, Peter, ed. (1997). And meaning for a life entire: Festschrift for Charles A. Moser on the occasion of his sixtieth birthday. Columbus, Ohio: Slavica. ISBN 0-89357-249-7.
