= Anastasia Dimitrova-Moser =

Bulgarian politician (born 1937)

- Анастасия Георгиева Димитрова-Мозер
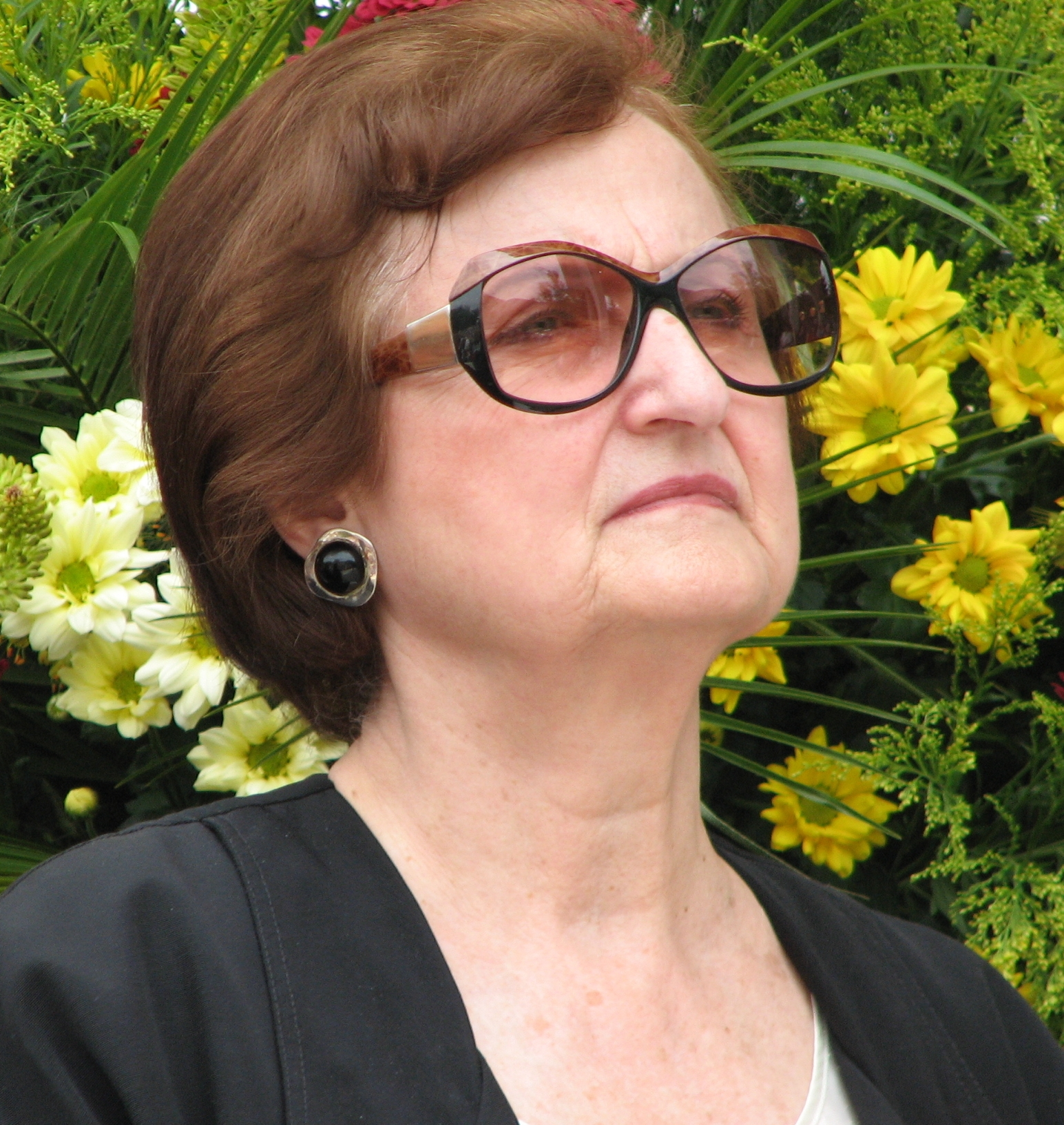

Personal details
- Born: June 30, 1937 (age 89) Sofia, Bulgaria
- Party: Bulgarian Agrarian National Union
- Education: Georgetown University; George Washington University
- Occupation: Politician

Anastasia Georgieva Dimitrova-Moser (Bulgarian: Анастасия Георгиева Димитрова-Мозер; born 30 June 1937) is a Bulgarian politician of the Bulgarian Agrarian National Union.

== Biography ==
Dimitrova was born on 30 June 1937 in Sofia as the daughter of agrarian politician G. M. Dimitrov. In May 1945 her father was exiled from the country and moved to the United States, but Dimitrova remained in Bulgaria and was continuously exerted pressure on by the communist authorities. She was asked to renounce her father several times and upon her refusal was expelled from high school and had to finish as a private student.

At age 25, she was allowed, to an extent as a propaganda move, to leave for the United States and live with her family. Living in the USA since 1962, she received a bachelor's degree in French studies from Georgetown University and a doctoral degree in Romance studies from The George Washington University.

After her graduation she worked as a doctor of Romance studies at The George Washington University (1966–1972) and at the World Bank. In 1972, she was employed by the Center for Hellenic Studies as an administrative worker. Between 1987 and 1992, she worked at the US branch of the International Institute for Strategic Studies and as a Voice of America journalist. From 1972 on, she was a member of the Bulgarian National Committee in the United States, founded by her father.

Dimitrova returned to Bulgaria in 1992 (after the Revolutions of 1989 removed the communist government) and joined the country's political life. She founded and headed the agrarian party Bulgarian Agrarian People's Union–People's Union from 1992 to 1997. She has been a member of the National Assembly of Bulgaria's 37th, 38th, 39th and 40th sessions, from 1995 until 2009. The chairwoman of the People's Agrarian Flag newspaper, she was a vice-chairperson of the 40th National Assembly.

Dimitrova was married to the late Charles Arthur Moser, a reader of Bulgarian and Slavic studies at the American University in Bulgaria, Blagoevgrad. Dimitrova is fluent in Bulgarian, English, French and Russian.
