= Republican, Social and Agrarian Party =

French agrarian party from 1936 to 1940

The Republican, Social and Agrarian Party (French: Parti républicain agraire et social, PRAS) was a small agrarian party in France which lasted from 1936 to 1940.

It split from the French Agrarian and Peasant Party (PAPF) which disagreed with the extra-parliamentary turn that the main party had taken by joining the Front paysan. Although PRAS were seen as left wing agrarians on the French political spectrum PRAS was centre-right. It included PAPF's only deputy in 1932, Louis Guillon, the party's General Secretary Henri Moilhant and a large part of the youth wing, the Jeunesses agraires et paysannes.

PRAS's failure led the youth wing's organizers to create the Republican Agrarian Union, closely aligned with the Radical Socialist Party.

== Sources ==
- Bernet, J (1979), "Un Compiégnois célèbre dans l'entre-deux-guerres : Fleurant Agricola, fondateur du Parti Agraire", Annales historiques compiégnoises modernes et contemporaines, No. 6 1979
- Jolly, Jean (1994), "Louis Guillon", Dictionnaire des parlementaires français 1940 - 1958 tome 3
