= Ignaz Trebitsch-Lincoln =

Hungarian adventurer and fraudster

Ignatius Timothy Trebitsch-Lincoln
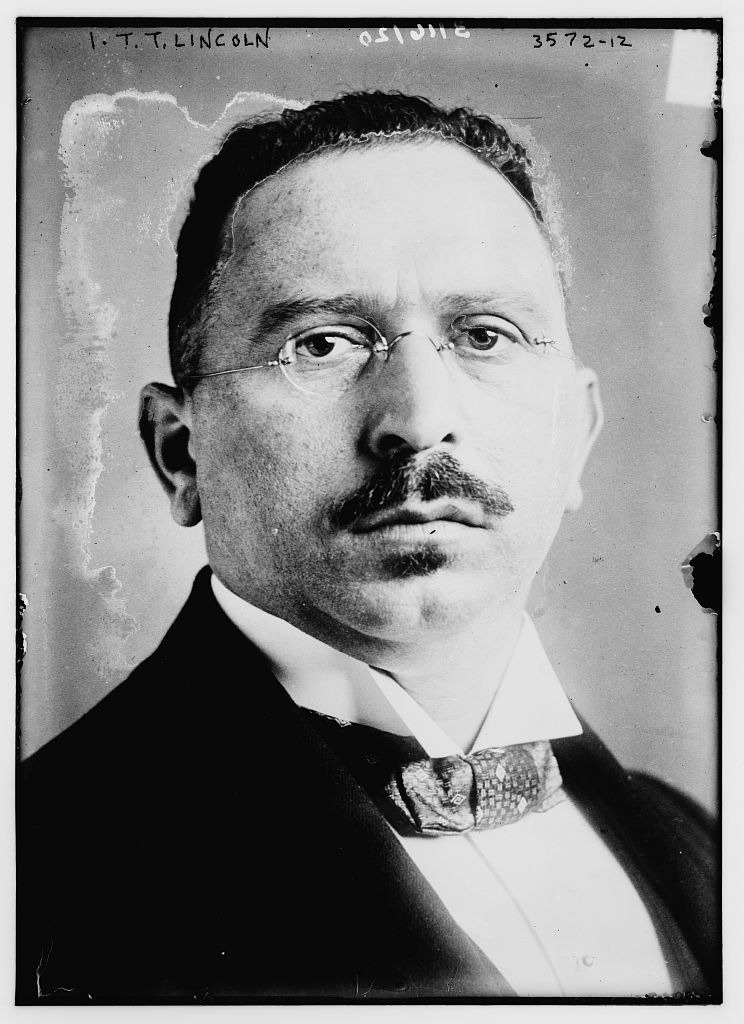
- Trebitsch-Lincoln c. 1915

Member of Parliament for Darlington
- In office January 1910 – November 1910
- Preceded by: Herbert Pease
- Succeeded by: Herbert Pease

Personal details
- Born: 4 April 1879 Paks, Austria-Hungary
- Died: 6 October 1943 (aged 64) Shanghai, Reorganized National Government of the Republic of China
- Occupation: Adventurer, con artist

Ignatius Timothy Trebitsch-Lincoln (Hungarian: Trebitsch-Lincoln Ignác, German: Ignaz Thimoteus Trebitzsch; 4 April 1879 – 6 October 1943) was a Hungarian-born adventurer and convicted con artist. Born in Hungary of Jewish descent, he spent much of his life traveling the world engaging in various confidence scams. Among his adventures, he worked as a Protestant missionary, Anglican priest, British Member of Parliament for Darlington, German right-wing politician and spy, Nazi collaborator, Buddhist abbot in China, and self-proclaimed Dalai Lama.

== Early clerical career ==
Ignácz Trebitsch (Hungarian: Trebitsch Ignác(z)) was born to an Orthodox Jewish family in the town of Paks in Hungary in 1879, subsequently moving with his family to Budapest. His father, Náthán Trebitsch (Hungarian: Trebitsch Náthán), was from Moravia.

After leaving school he enrolled in the Royal Hungarian Academy of Dramatic Art, but was frequently in trouble with the police over acts of petty theft. In 1897 he fled abroad, ending up in London, where he took up with some Christian missionaries and converted from Judaism. He was baptised on Christmas Day 1899, and set off to study at a Lutheran seminary in Breklum in Schleswig-Holstein, Germany, destined for the ministry. Restless, he was sent to Canada to carry out missionary work among the Jews of Montreal, first on behalf of the Presbyterians, and then the Anglicans. He returned to England in 1903 after a quarrel over the size of his stipend.

He became Tribich Lincoln (or I. T. T. Lincoln) by deed poll in October 1904 and secured British naturalisation on 11 May 1909.

== Member of Parliament ==
Trebitsch-Lincoln made the acquaintance of the Archbishop of Canterbury, who appointed him as a curate in Appledore, Kent, his last ecclesiastical post. Soon thereafter he met Seebohm Rowntree, a prominent member of the Liberal Party, who offered him the position of his private secretary. With Rowntree's support, he was nominated in 1909 as the Liberal candidate for the Parliamentary constituency of Darlington in County Durham, even though he was still a Hungarian citizen at the time. In the election of January 1910 he beat the sitting Unionist member Herbert Pease, whose family had held the seat since 1895. However, at the time of this dramatic entrance to political life, MPs were not paid and Lincoln's financial troubles grew worse. He was unable to stand when a second general election was called in November 1910 and lost the post. Darlington returned to Pease.

== International confidence man ==
In the years leading up to the outbreak of the First World War, he was involved in a variety of failed commercial endeavours, living for a time in Bucharest, hoping to make money in the oil industry. Back in London with no money, he offered his services to the British government as a spy. When he was rejected he went to the Netherlands and made contact with the Germans, who employed him as a double agent.

Returning to England, he narrowly escaped arrest, leaving for the United States in 1915, where he made contact with the German military attaché, Franz von Papen. Papen was instructed by Berlin to have nothing to do with him, whereupon Trebitsch sold his story to the New York World Magazine, which published it under the banner headline "Revelation of I. T. T. Lincoln, Former Member of Parliament Who Became a Spy". His book Revelations of an International Spy was published by Robert M. McBride in New York in 1916.

The British government, anxious to avoid any embarrassment, employed the Pinkerton agency to track down Trebitsch-Lincoln. He was returned to England—though not on a charge of espionage, which was not covered by the Anglo-American extradition treaty, but of fraud. He served three years in Parkhurst Prison on the Isle of Wight, and was released and deported in 1919. His British nationality was revoked by the Home Secretary on 3 December 1918.

== Germany and Austria ==
A penniless refugee, Trebitsch-Lincoln worked his way bit by bit into the extreme right-wing and militarist fringe in Weimar Germany, making the acquaintance of Wolfgang Kapp and Erich Ludendorff among others. In 1920, following the Kapp Putsch, he was appointed press censor to Kapp's provisional government. In this capacity he met Adolf Hitler, who flew in from Munich the day before the Putsch collapsed.

With the fall of Kapp, Trebitsch fled south from Munich to Vienna to Budapest, intriguing all along the way, linking up with a whole variety of fringe political factions, such as a loose alliance of monarchists and reactionaries from all over Europe known as the White International. Entrusted with the organization's archives, he promptly sold the information to the secret services of various governments. Tried and acquitted on a charge of high treason in Austria, he was deported yet again. His name was also used by other impostors; following the assassination of the Italian MP Giacomo Matteotti in 1924, the police arrested a certain Otto Thierschadl alias Chirzel, who gave as his name Tribisch Lincoln.

== Family ==
In March 1926 Trebitsch-Lincoln's 23-year-old son, John Lincoln, was hanged for murder at Shepton Mallet prison. There was extensive newspaper coverage of the father's desperate journey from Ceylon to see his son before his execution, which proved to be in vain.

== Conversion to Buddhism ==
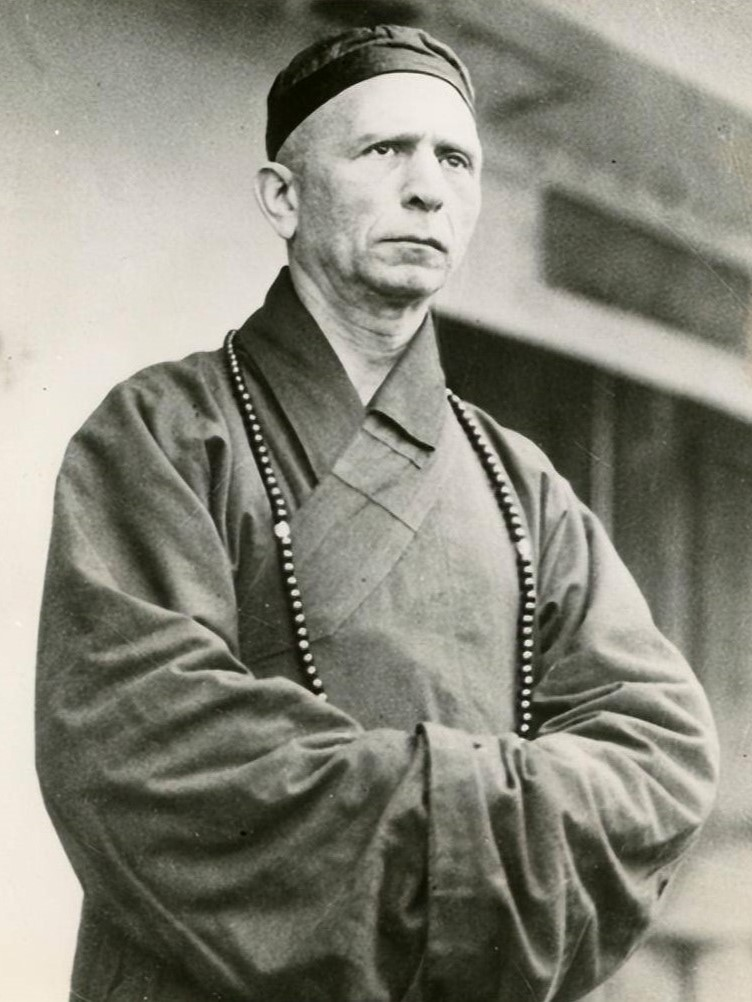
Trebitsch-Lincoln as Chao Kung

He ended up in China, where he took up employment under three different warlords including Wu Peifu. Supposedly after a mystic experience in the late 1920s, Trebitsch converted to Buddhism, becoming a monk. In 1931, he rose to the rank of abbot, establishing his own monastery in Shanghai. All initiates were required to hand over their possessions to Abbot Chao Kung (Chinese: 照空; pinyin: Zhào Kōng), as he now called himself.

In 1937, he transferred his loyalties yet again, this time to the Empire of Japan, producing anti-British propaganda on their behalf. Chinese sources say that he also wrote numerous letters and articles for the European press condemning Japanese imperial aggression in China. After the outbreak of the Second World War, he also made contact with the Nazis, offering to broadcast for them and to raise up all the Buddhists of the East against any remaining British influence in the area. The chief of the Gestapo in the Far East, SS Colonel Josef Meisinger, urged that this scheme receive serious attention. It was even seriously suggested that Trebitsch be allowed to accompany German agents to Tibet to implement the scheme. He proclaimed himself the new Dalai Lama after the death of the 13th Dalai Lama, a move that was supported by the Japanese but rejected by the Tibetans.

== Death ==
Trebitsch-Lincoln died of stomach trouble in Shanghai in 1943, aged 64. Yosef Nedava, who attended his funeral, assumed that the coffin was empty. In 1956, he wrote Trebitsch's biography in Hebrew.

== See also ==
- Sidney Reilly

Parliament of the United Kingdom
Preceded by Herbert Pease	Member of Parliament for Darlington; January 1910 – December 1910	Succeeded by Herbert Pease
