= Society Guard =

Paramilitary organisation in Norway

The Society Guard (Norwegian: Samfundsvernet), sometimes Norwegian Society Guard (Norsk Samfundsvern), was a volunteer paramilitary organisation in Norway. It was founded in 1923 in connection to the anti-strike Society Aid (Samfundshjelpen). Organised by the centre-right parties, these "emergency groups" were prepared to mobilise in case of war or revolution. The organisation was directed specifically against the Marxist labour movement, and recruited officers and volunteers for an armed guard against revolutionary activists. Led by officers, it was organised in small secret armed groups. In accordance with the "police law" of 1928, it could be used as a reserve police force. Around 1930, it reportedly had between 10,000 and 15,000 members.

From 1925, the organisation was led by Ragnvald Hvoslef. Other leading figures included Hjalmar Riiser-Larsen. The organisation Leidangen which emerged in 1931 had its background in the Society Guard. To counter such organisations, the Labour Party started organising "Labour Protection Groups" in the 1930s. The Society Guard was dissolved in 1935 following the establishment of the Labour Party Nygaardsvold's Cabinet, after it was revealed that it operated military training with material from the Norwegian Army. According to Hans Fredrik Dahl, the Society Guard was the closest Norway came to a White Guard.
