= G. M. Dimitrov =

Bulgarian politician (1903–1972)

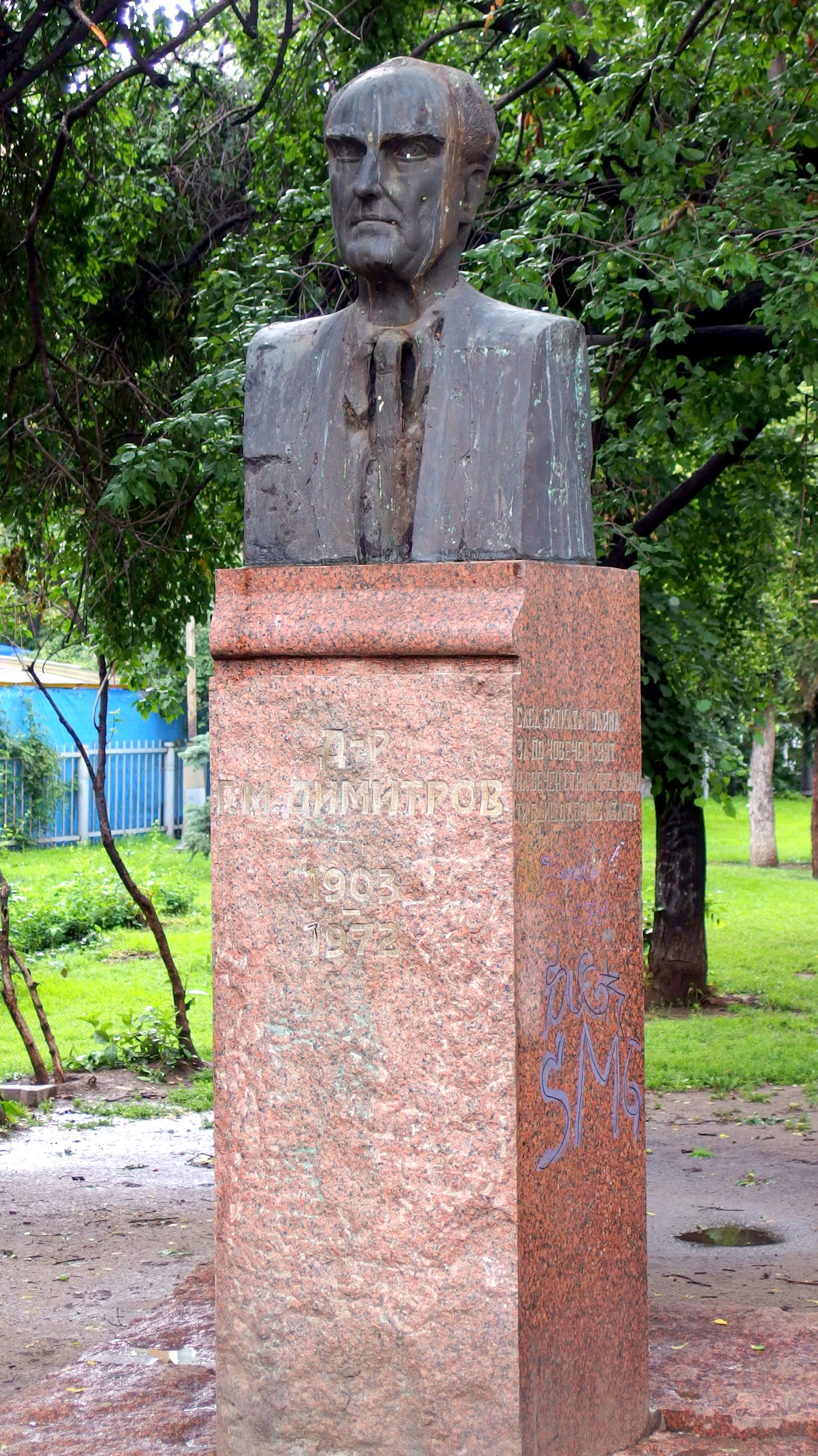
Bust of Dimitrov in Sofia, Bulgaria

Georgi Mihov Dimitrov (Bulgarian: Георги Михов Димитров; 15 April 1903 – 21 November 1972), known as Gemeto (Bulgarian: Гемето, lit. 'The G. M.') to distinguish him from Georgi Dimitrov Mihaylov, was a Bulgarian politician, a leading figure of the Bulgarian Agrarian National Union during the 1930s and 1940s, and an opponent of fascism and communism alike.

== History ==
G. M. Dimitrov was born in the Eastern Thracian village of Eni Chiflik by the Sea of Marmara (then part of the Ottoman vilayet of Edirne, today Yeniçiftlik in Tekirdağ Province, Turkey) on 15 April 1903 to a Bulgarian family. His family, along with practically all Bulgarians in Eastern Thrace, was forced to move to Bulgaria in 1913 after the Balkan Wars, and settled in the village of Doyrentsi in Lovech Province.

In 1922, he became a member of the Bulgarian Agrarian National Union (BANU), a party devoted to representing the causes of the Bulgarian peasantry. During the September Uprising Dimitrov organized a peasant revolt in the Lovech region to counter the coup d'état of 1923. He was imprisoned and may have been sentenced to death had it not been for his young age. After the St Nedelya Church assault in 1925, he was arrested again along with other opposition figures.

In 1923, he began to study diplomacy at the Free University of Political and Economic Sciences (today UNWE) in Sofia, and in 1929 he graduated in medicine from the University of Zagreb in 1929 and quickly engaged in politics upon settling in Sofia, the capital of Bulgaria. He was part of the Board of Managers of BANU from 1932–1933 and later worked for the Standing Committee of the United BANU ("Aleksandar Stamboliyski" and "Vrabcha 1"). In the wake of the coup d'état of 1934 he was in opposition to the monarchist regime and semi-legally headed BANU.

In 1941, G. M. Dimitrov organized a large-scale campaign against Bulgaria's growing political and military alignment with the Axis powers during World War II. As his campaign failed, he was forced to go underground and promptly left the country. Between 1941 and 1944 G. M. Dimitrov headed the pro-Allied Bulgarian National Committee, headquartered in Cairo. He also served as director of the illegal radio station Free and Independent Bulgaria. After the coup d'état of 1944, G. M. Dimitrov returned to Bulgaria and became the leader of BANU. Due to his anti-Fatherland Front activities he was deprived of his leadership and expelled from the party. Thanks to the intervention of the United States ambassador, Dimitrov was saved from death. His fellow leader of the party Nikola Petkov was executed by the Bulgarian Communist Party after a show trial in 1947.

In May 1945, G. M. Dimitrov left the country; two years later, he founded the Agrarian Committee or Green Front, an anti-communist union of Eastern European émigrés in the West. He also headed the Bulgarian National Committee, a strictly Bulgarian organization with similar goals. In 1951, he assisted the foundation of the first Bulgarian NATO company, the Bulgarian Volunteer Company 4093, that consisted of 200 émigrés.

Dimitrov died in Washington, D.C., on 21 November 1972. His daughter Anastasia Dimitrova-Moser (b. 1937) is also a BANU politician. He also had a son called Aleksandar.

== See also ==
- List of Eastern Bloc defectors
