= Operation Frühlingssonne =

Military plan

Operation Frühlingssonne (Note: German: Unternehmen Frühlingssonne, lit.: "Spring Sun") was the code name for a military plan created by Paul von Hindenburg, during the 1918–1919 Greater Poland uprising, according to which the Weimar Republic and the Russian SFSR were meant to attack the Second Polish Republic. According to the plan, Germany would attack Poland in multiple outflanking points: Suwałki, Grodno, Toruń, and Upper Silesia, heading to Warsaw.

On 21 June, 1919, AKO Süd ordered the realization of the plan. The next day, German aircraft crossed the Polish border, in the region of Częstochowa. From 23 to 27 June, German troops fought with the Polish army near Bolesławiec and Wieruszów. The operation was canceled in late June. On 28 June, 1919, Germany had signed the Treaty of Versailles, ending any plans to continue the conflict against Poland.

== Bibliography ==
- Encyklopedia Białych Plam, vol. 18.
