= Yeniçiftlik =

- Neighbourhood
- Location in Turkey Yeniçiftlik (Marmara)
- Coordinates: 41°01′N 27°51′E
- Country: Turkey
- Province: Tekirdağ
- District: Marmara Ereğlisi
- Elevation: 75 m (246 ft)
- Population (2022): 11,777
- Time zone: UTC+3 (TRT)
- Postal code: 59740
- Area code: 0282

Yeniçiftlik (literally "new farm") is a neighbourhood of the municipality and district of Marmara Ereğlisi, Tekirdağ Province, Turkey. Its population is 11,777 (2022). Before the 2013 reorganisation, it was a town (belde). It is situated in Rumeli (Eastern Thrace, the European part of Turkey) between Tekirdağ and Marmara Ereğlisi. Although the original settlement was a few kilometers north of the sea side, the new quarters of the town are at the Marmara Sea coast. The distance to Marmara Ereğlisi is 10 kilometres (6.2 mi) and to Tekirdağ is 30 kilometres (19 mi).

The town was mostly a Bulgarian settlement during the Ottoman Empire era. But according to agreement the former population of the town was replaced by the Turks from Bulgaria in the first quarter of the 20th century. The settlement was specialized vinification in the early years of the Turkish republic with the help of German investors. But the main agricultural product is sun flower. Fishery and cattle rising are among the other activities.
