= Pierre Mathé =

French politician (1882–1956)

- Born: Pierre Cyprien Mathé; 1 August 1882; Giry, Nièvre, France
- Died: 3 June 1956 (aged 73); Paris, France
- Occupation: Politician
- Political party: French Agrarian and Peasant Party

Pierre Mathé (1882-1956) was a French conservative agrarian politician.

== Early life ==
Pierre Mathé was born on 1 August 1882 in Giry, rural France.

== Career ==
Mathé joined the French Agrarian and Peasant Party, an agrarian conservative political party, and became its President. He served as a member of the Chamber of Deputies for the Côte-d'Or from 1936 to 1942.

He co-authored Le manifeste paysan: essai d'une doctrine humaniste appliquée à l'agriculture française with François de Clermont-Tonnerre, published in 1937.

On 10 July 1940, Mathé voted in favour of granting the cabinet presided by Marshal Philippe Pétain authority to draw up a new constitution, thereby effectively ending the French Third Republic and establishing Vichy France. In November 1941, he was made a member of the National Council of Vichy France.

== Death ==
He died on 3 June 1956 in Paris, France.
