= Charles Kroth Moser =

American novelist

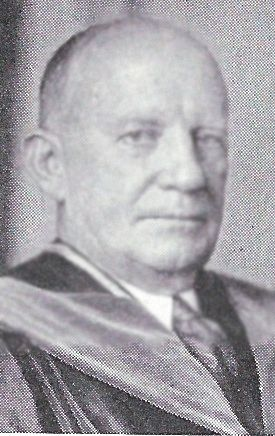

Charles Kroth Moser (August 27, 1877 – September 23, 1968) was an American novelist, journalist, U.S. Consul to foreign nations and was stationed in Aden, Ceylon, Harbin, Manchuria, and Tiflis (in the Republic of Georgia). His writing was published in various magazines.

He was born in Marlon, Virginia and went to schools in Richmond, Virginia.

Moser received a law degree at University of California at Berkley in 1902 and practiced law until 1905. He was a journalist for the San Francisco Chronicle from 1900 until 1904 and an associate editor for The Washington Post in 1908. A prolific writer, he wrote many short stories from 1905 until 1928.

His first published short story in 1905 was "In Chinatown". Subsequently, another 27 of his short stories and 3 novellas were published over the next 20 years. He wrote an autobiography entitled, Grandfather's Story, published in 1965.

He was appointed U.S. Consul to Aden, Arabia in 1909 and as U.S. consul to Ceylon (now called Sri Lanka) in 1911. He also served as U.S. Consul to Harbin, Manchuria in 1914, as US Consul to Tiflis, the capital of Georgia in 1919. He arrived in Tiflis in January 1920.

He authored publications on trade. He wrote an article about San Bernardino, California.

== Bibliography ==
- "An Episode in the Desert"
- "The Hour of the Rat"
- The Cotton Textile Industry of Far Eastern Countries by Charles Kroth Moser. Pepperell manufacturing Company, 1930
- The United States in India's Trade
- Grandfather's story; the autobiography of a maverick
