= Nikola Petkov =

Bulgarian politician (1893–1947)

- Никола Димитров Петков
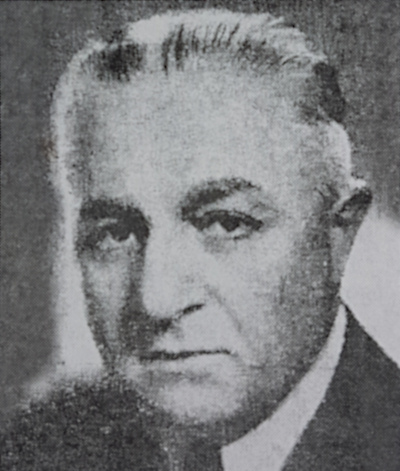
- Born: July 8, 1893; Sofia, Bulgaria
- Died: September 23, 1947 (aged 54); Sofia, Bulgaria
- Cause of death: Execution by hanging
- Occupation: Politician

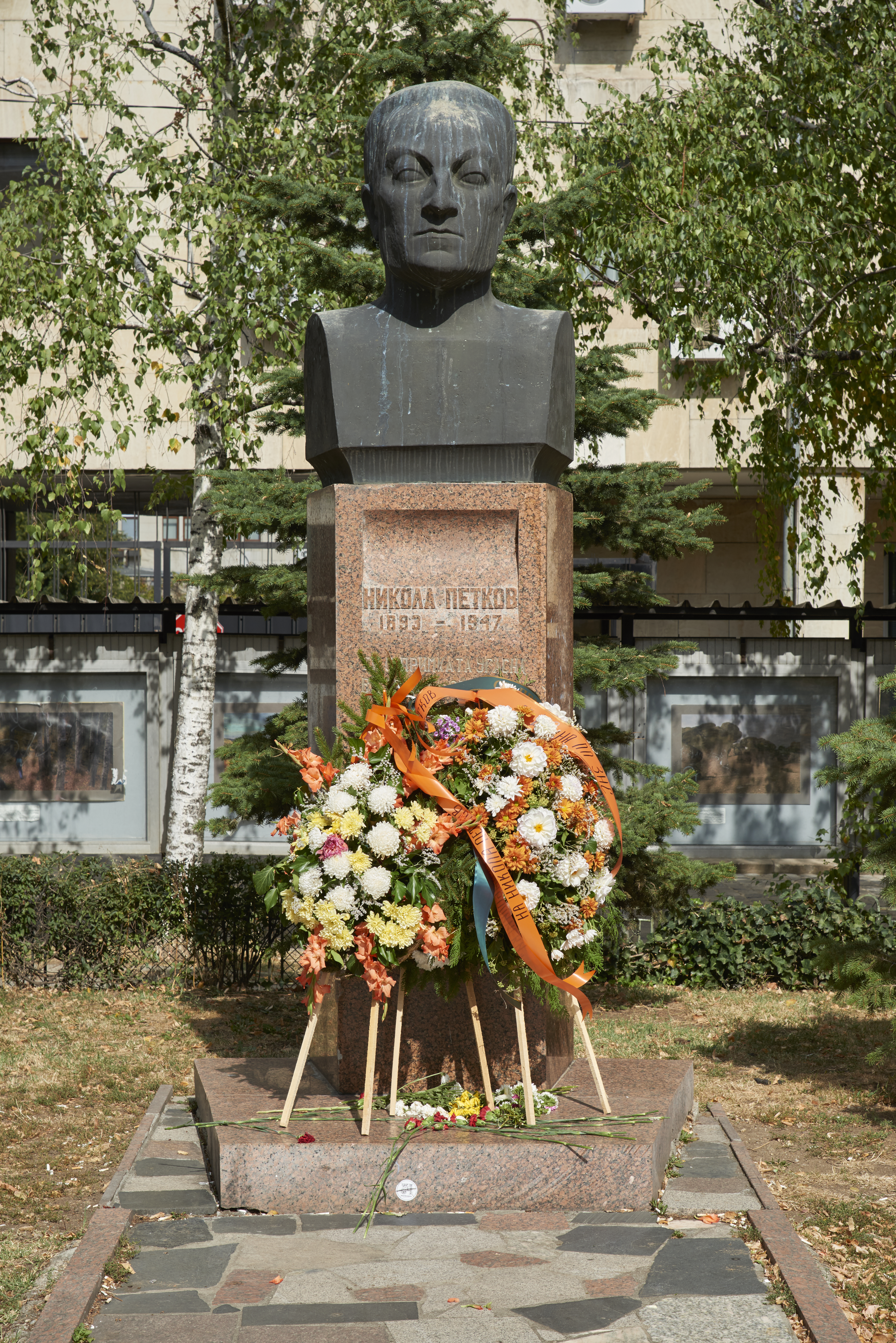
Bust of Nikola Petkov in Sofia

Nikola Dimitrov Petkov (Bulgarian: Никола Димитров Петков; July 8, 1893 – September 23, 1947) was a Bulgarian politician, one of the leaders of the Bulgarian Agrarian National Union (usually abbreviated as BZNS). He entered politics in the early 1930s. Like many other peasant party leaders in Poland, Hungary, and Bulgaria in 1945–1947, Petkov was tried and executed soon after postwar Soviet control was established in his country. State Department emissary, Mark Ethridge, sent to Bulgaria in 1945 to report on conditions to President Truman, called him "the bravest man I've ever known." He was a son of the politician Dimitar Petkov. His brother Petko Petkov was shot dead by an unknown assassin in 1924. Nikola Petkov was among the founders of the Fatherland Front (FF) in 1943 and participated in the establishment of the new government before becoming its target.

== Early years ==
He graduated from the 1st Sofia Boys High School in 1910 and after that studied law and politics at the Sorbonne, Paris. He returned to Bulgaria to participate in the Balkan Wars (1912–1913) serving in a Guards regiment. After World War I Petkov continued his studies in Paris and graduated with excellent marks in 1922. He worked in the Bulgarian legation in Paris. After the coup of 9 June 1923 when the BZNS government under Aleksandar Stamboliyski was removed from office, Nikola Petkov resigned and stayed in France where he worked as a journalist.

== Civil activities ==
In 1929 he returned to Bulgaria and became an editor of the newspapers Zemya (1931–1932) and Zemedelsko zname – an organ of Bulgarian Agrarian People's Union "Aleksandar Stamboliyski" (1932–1933). He prepared and published a book on Aleksandar Stamboliyski in which he made political analysis and characteristics on the personality and the activities of the agrarian leader.

After the coup of 19 May 1934 Petkov cooperated with democratic parties including the Labours' Party – the legal organization of the banned Bulgarian Communist Party. He was elected to the 24th National Assembly (1938–1939).

Due to his anti-fascist activity his election as a member of the parliament was invalidated in December 1938 and Nikola Petkov was interned in Ivailovgrad.

After Dr G. M. Dimitrov emigrated in 1941, Nikola Petkov took the leadership of BZNS "Aleksandar Stamboliyski". That same year he was sent to the Gonda Voda camp. He negotiated with the other democratic parties for the establishment of the Fatherland Front and represented BZNS in the national council of the FF. In 1943 Nikola Petkov was interned in Svishtov where he continued with his political activity and was engaged in the organization of the FF. He was meeting with Kosta Lulchev and other political activists.

Petkov returned to Sofia in the summer of 1944.

== Political activity ==
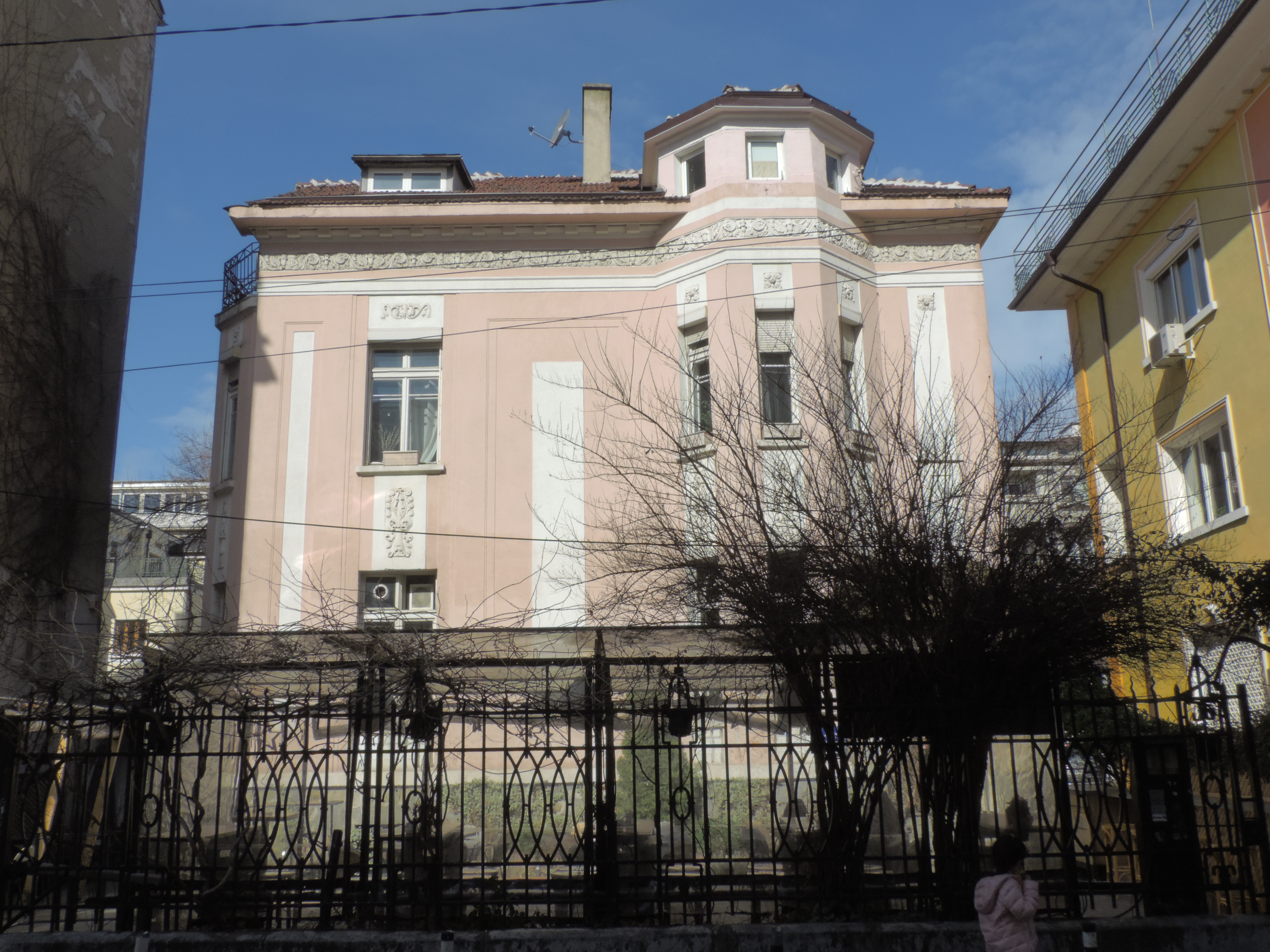
The house on 12 Tsar Ivan Shishman Str., Sofia

From 9 September 1944 to 26 August 1945 he was a minister without portfolio in the first government of the FF. From January 1945 he became a leader of the anti-communist United opposition. From 26 November 1946 he was an MP in the 6th Great National Assembly.

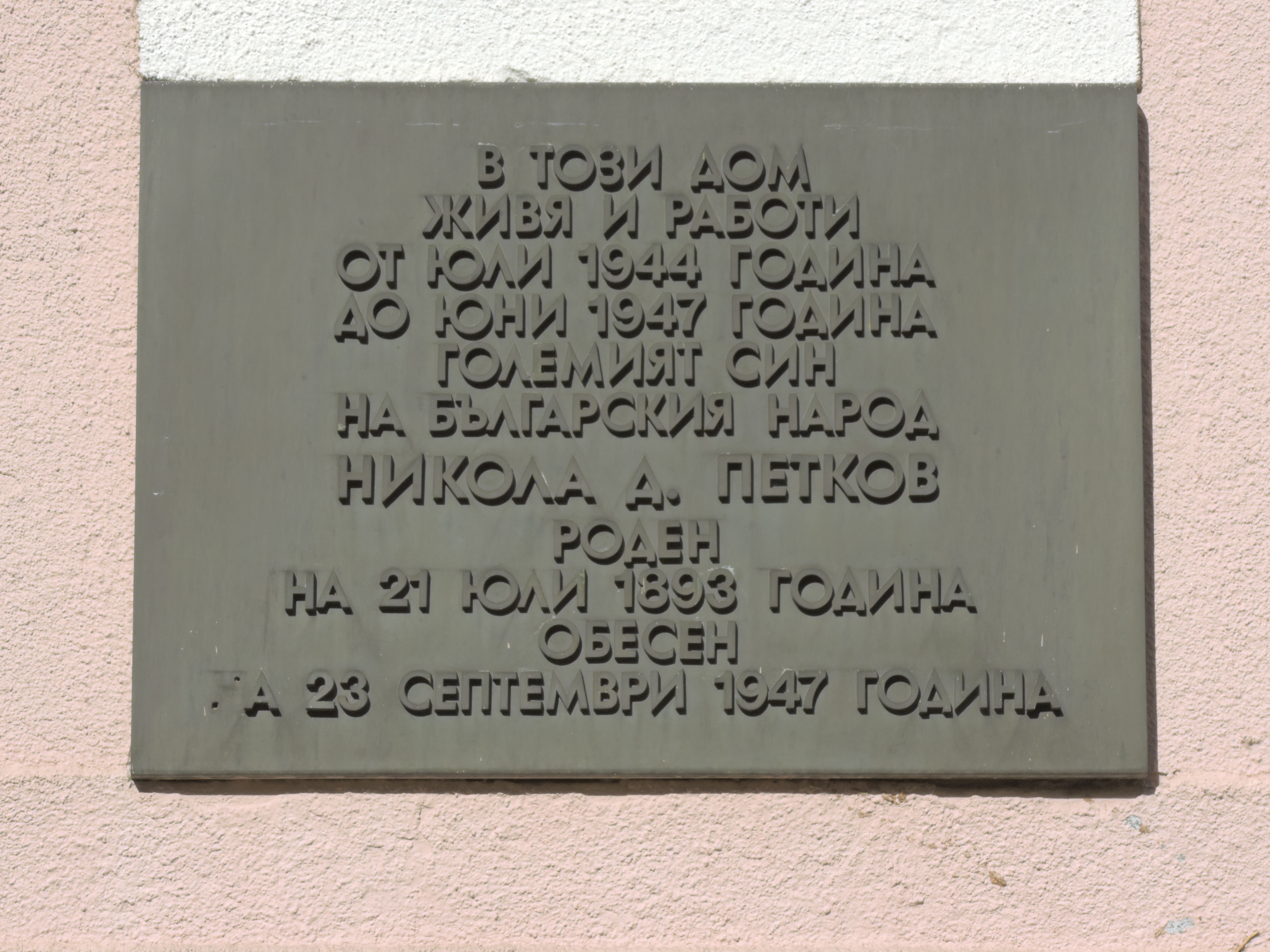
Memorial plaque on the facade of the house, where Petkov lived from July 1944 to June 1947

His struggle to preserve parliamentary democracy was viewed by the communists as a form of counter-revolutionary activity. His parliamentary immunity was lifted on 5 June 1947 and he was arrested in the Parliament building itself; colleagues who tried to prevent the arrest were beaten up. After a show trial in which the defence was denied the rights to legal representation or to present evidence, he was found guilty of espionage and sentenced to death on 16 August that year. Though he protested his innocence during his staged group trial with four other 'co-conspirators,' and despite the protests of Western nations, Nikola Petkov was executed by hanging on 23 September 1947 and buried in an unknown grave. The Bulgarian secret police arranged for a false confession to be publicly printed after Petkov's death, but it was so obviously faked that the move quickly became an embarrassment and ceased to be mentioned by the authorities. Petkov had been denied a Christian burial or last rites, despite being one of Bulgaria's few genuinely religious public figures. At his death, Reuben Markham wrote, "I have known no nobler friend of common people, no stauncher anti-Fascist, no more devoted democrat." He was posthumously rehabilitated on 15 January 1990.

== See also ==
- Bulgarian Agrarian National Union
- Georgi Dimitrov
