= Georg Heim =

Bavarian politician and agriculturalist (1865–1938)

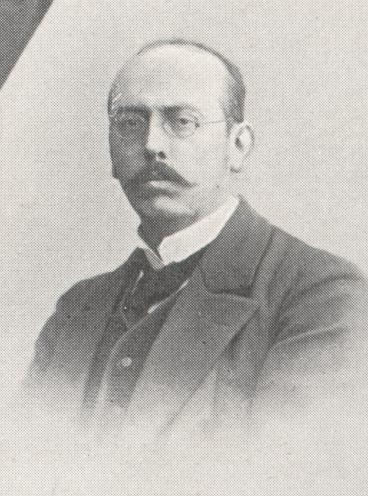
- Heim in 1906
- Born: April 24 1865; Aschaffenburg, Kingdom of Bavaria
- Died: August 17 1938; Würzburg, Gau Main Franconia, Nazi Germany
- Occupation: Politician
- Political party: Bavarian Centre Party (1895-1918); Bavarian People's Party (1918-1933)

Georg Heim (April 24 1865–August 17 1938) was a Bavarian politician and agriculturalist. He was a leading figure in Bavarian conservatism and agrarianism. After earning a doctorate in economics in 1894, he founded the Bavarian Christian Peasants' Association in 1898 and was elected to both the Bavarian Landtag and the Reichstag. Following the German Revolution he emerged as a prominent Bavarian nationalist and co-founded the Bavarian People's Party, serving as its first leader from 1918 to 1921. A committed anti-fascist, he publicly denounced Hitler and attempted to restore the Wittelsbach monarchy to prevent the Nazi takeover of Bavaria in 1933, after which he was stripped of his positions and spent his remaining years as an agricultural advisor in Würzburg.

== Biography ==
Heim was born in 1865 as the youngest of 6 kids in Aschaffenburg. His parents died early which lead him to begin work as a journalist while studying English and French. In 1890 he became a teaching assistant in Freising and ran a new paper called the Freisinger Tagblatt on behalf of the Bavarian Centre Party until he was transferred to Wunsiedel. After he completed a doctorate in economics in 1893 he founded a loan association and Raiffeisen cooperative, which he merged at the end of 1894 to form the Fichtelgebirge Sales Cooperative, he later got a teaching position in Ansbach which further increased his popularity in Franconia.

Riding off this popularity he was elected to both the Bavarian Landtag and the German Reichstag as a member for the Bavarian Centre Party's agrarian wing. In 1898 he founded the Bavarian Christian Peasants’ Association (German: Bayerischer Christliche Bauernverein), a right-wing co-operative meant to serve as a counterweight to the liberal Bavarian Peasants League, the Bauernverein was headquartered the Regensburg and was primarily active in Bavaria's protestant north. While the Peasants League focused primarily on state aid from farmers the Bauernverein focused primarily on self-help for farmers. It was responsible for the Bavarian Centre Party's 1918 rebranding to the Bavarian People's Party in order the separate the party from the less federalist Centre Party. In 1899 he founded another cooperative and using the profits from this he financed social services and education for young farmers. Throughout Heim's political career he was primarily a supporter of the Bavarian peasantry, and outside of that his political beliefs were shaped mostly by opportunism, and despite his education he was able to campaign effectively among the peasantry. In 1911 Heim left politics and dedicated himself solely to the Bauernverein.

During World War 1 he worked to relieve food shortages and was one the primary public figures accusing the central government of harming Bavarian peasantry for the sake of other groups. He was also a strong proponent of Ultranationalism and expansionism in service to the economic interests of the Bavarian peasantry. The German Revolution drew him back into politics, where in Bavaria there was a bitter conflict between the Freikorps and the Bavarian Soviet Republic. He was part of a faction of counter-revolutionaries who were willing to conciliate with the Soviet in order to pursue Bavarian Independence and a separate, more lenient, peace with the Allies. And while more cautious than some members he definitely a sympathy for Bavarian Nationalism and a separate peace. With him writing an editorial arguing for a "Greater Bavaria" with the Main river as its northern border and the incorporation of Tyrol and Upper Austria, though he later retreated from this position. There have been claims he held negotiations with the Allies but whether he actually did or not by the end of 1918 he was the definite figurehead of Bavarian nationalism. 1920 Heim sponsored the creation of a monarchist and separatist political group in Bavaria the Bavarian League for King and Homeland (German: Bayerische Hesmat und Konigsbund) though this and another monarchist/separatist groups failed the attracted many supporters despite there being significant support for the return of the House of Wittelsbach, as most Bavarian monarchists supported the Bavarian People's Party. Throughout this era he, along with other Bavarian separatists, worked to establish relations between France and the Bavarian separatists as France wanted a weakened Germany and Bavaria would need French protection from Germany to become independent, though little came of this and little is known of the specifics of these relations. As time went on however Heim abandoned his Bavarian nationalist ideas in favor of federalist system, with him being a staunch anti-prussianist.

Simultaneously in 1918 he was a founding member of the Bavarian People's Party, and from 1919-1920 he served in the Weimar National Assembly. After the founding of the Bavarian People's Party he served as the party's first leader from 1918-1921 and ruled through fear. He was elected to the Reichstag in the 1920 election for the BVP and served until 1924, in 1920 he became president of Bavaria's newly established State Peasants' Chamber. On the federal level he opposed the Weimar constitution believing it was not sufficiently federalist, and opposed the fiscal reforms of Matthias Erzberger for similar reasons. He broke the BVP's alliance with the Centre Party, and during the 1925 German Presidential election he convinced the BVP to support Paul von Hidenburg over Wilhelm Marx, likely costing the latter the presidency.

Heim was a committed anti-fascist who dubbed Hitler "worse than Eisner" and a charlatan, with the Nazi's consequently accusing Heim of fermenting Bavarian separatism. He again supported Hindenburg in 1932 and in 1933 he attempted to restore the Wittelsbach's to prevent the Nazi takeover in Bavaria though this was ineffective. After the rise of the Nazi's he was stripped of his positions and lived the rest of his life as an agricultural advisor in Würzburg.
