= French Agrarian and Peasant Party =

Defunct political party in France

French Agrarian and Peasant Party Parti agraire et paysan français
- Abbreviation: PAPF
- Founder: Gabriel Fleurant
- Founded: 1927
- Dissolved: January 30, 1939
- Succeeded by: Farmers' Party
- Newspaper: La Voix de la terre
- Ideology: Agrarianism; Conservativism; Corporatism; Right-wing populism
- Political position: Far-right
- National affiliation: Farmers' Front (1934–1936)
- International affiliation: International Agrarian Bureau

The French Agrarian and Peasant Party (French: Parti agraire et paysan français, PAPF) was a French political party founded in 1927 during the French Third Republic by Gabriel Fleurent.

The PAPF was founded on a corporatist, right-wing populist and agrarian program after Fleurent visited Eastern Europe, visited existing peasant based parties and was from the start aligned with their International Agrarian Bureau. The party's first congress, held at Paris in January 1929.

In 1932 they managed to elect one deputy to the National Assembly, Louis Guillon of Vosges.

It was initially politically eclectic, but in 1934 it moved right and it joined the Front paysan with the activist and radically right wing Comités de défense paysanne and the conservative Union nationale des syndicats agricoles. One sign of radicalization was at the height of the Stavisky Affair, proposing the death penalty by hanging for politicians found guilty of forgery or embezzlement.

This move to the right in 1936 divided the PAPF into two factions, while both were right wing on the French political spectrum, the more Republican and centrist faction founded the Republican, Social and Agrarian Party led by the PAPF's sole deputy in the 1932 Assembly, Louis Guillon. The more right-wing element remained known as the PAPF and was led by Pierre Mathé (Côte-d'Or).

In 1936 PAPF elected eleven deputies.

The Front paysan itself fell apart in 1936 due to differences in political strategy.

Post-war a small Peasant Party existed, with a large section splitting off in 1951 as the Independants Paysans and then joining the liberal National Centre of Independents and Peasants (CNI), which exists to this day (though much weaker than in the past).

== Sources ==
- Bernet, J (1979), "Un Compiégnois célèbre dans l'entre-deux-guerres : Fleurant Agricola, fondateur du Parti Agraire", Annales historiques compiégnoises modernes et contemporaines, No. 6 1979
- Handman, Marie-Elizabeth (1967), "Les agriculteurs et la politique depuis Méline", Après-Demain. Journal Mensuel de Documentation Politique (in French) (94–95)
- Ory, Pascal (1975), "Le dorgérisme, institution et discours d'une colère paysanne (1929-1939)", Revue d'Histoire Moderne et Contemporaine, 22 (2): 168–190, doi:10.3406/rhmc.1975.2416
- Passmore, Kevin (2013), "11 Apogee and Crisis (1928–1932)", The Right in France from the Third Republic to Vichy (online ed.), Oxford: Oxford Academic, doi:10.1093/acprof:oso/9780199658206.003.0004, ISBN 9780191745034
- Paxton, Robert O. (1997-09-26), French Peasant Fascism : Henry Dorgeres' Greenshirts and the Crises of French Agriculture, 1929-1939, Oxford University Press, USA, ISBN 978-0-19-535474-4
