= Front paysan =

French political group, 1934 to 1936

Farmers' Front Front paysan
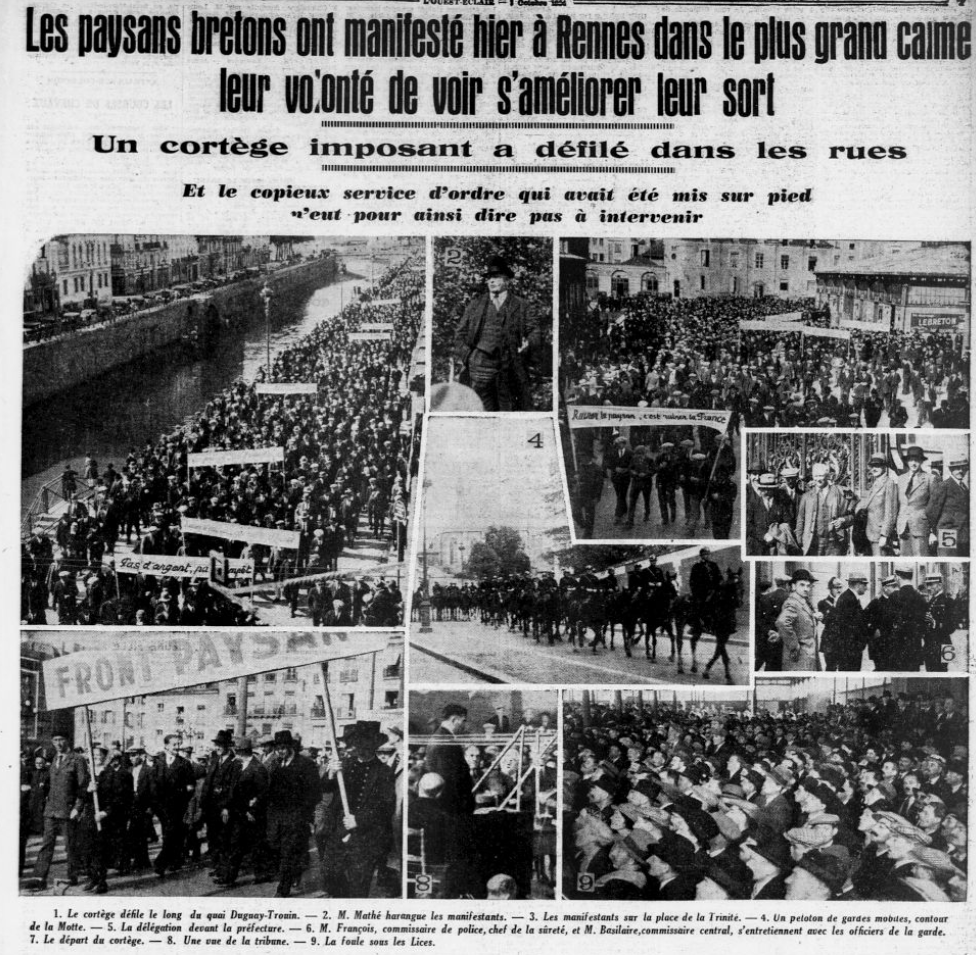
- Report in L'Ouest-Éclair on a demonstration held by the Farmers' Front in Rennes, October 1934
- Abbreviation: FP
- General Secretary: Jacques Le Roy Ladurie
- Leaders: Gabriel Fleurant; Henri Dorgères; Jacques Le Roy Ladurie
- Founder: Henri Dorgères
- Founded: 22 June 1934
- Dissolved: 1 March 1936
- Newspaper: Syndicats paysans
- Ideology: Agrarianism; Corporatism; Para-fascism
- Political position: Far-right
- Members: PAPF; CDP; UNSA

The Farmers' Front (French: Front paysan) was a group representing the French agrarian movement founded in 1934 consisting of the French Agrarian and Peasant Party, the Comités de défense paysanne, and the Union nationale des syndicats agricoles.

== History ==
Jacques Le Roy Ladurie served as its general secretary. It published the journal Syndicats paysans.

In the 1935 Loir-et-Cher by-election Henry Dorgères, the founder of the Comités de défense paysanne, stood unsuccessfully for the Loir-et-Cher department under the Farmers' Front banner, where he was narrowly defeated in the second round of voting by the Radical-Socialist Party candidate Émile Laurens.

The Farmers' Front's ambiguous attitude towards Republican institutions meant that it did not have support from the Croix de Feu.

The Farmers' Front fell apart in 1936 due to differences in political strategy.

== Sources ==
- Paxton, Robert O. (1997). French Peasant Fascism: Henry Dorgères' Greenshirts and the Crises of French Agriculture, 1929-1939. Oxford University Press. ISBN 978-0-19-535474-4.
