= Union nationale des syndicats agricoles =

The Union nationale des syndicats agricoles (UNSA) was collection of French farming unions that was active in the 1930s. It had originally been called the Union centrale des syndicats agricoles (UCSA) but in 1934 changed its name to the Union nationale at the same time as Jacques Le Roy Ladurie, a landowner who had led the dynamic Calvados syndicat became secretary-general.

The founders were Jacques Le Roy Ladurie, count Hervé Budes de Guébriant, Louis Salleron, Roger Grand (President until 1938), Joseph Boulangé (President from 1938) and Rémy Goussault.

In 1934 the UNSA joined with other groups to form Front paysan, of which Le Roy Ladurie was the General Secretary, of which the quasi-fascist Greenshirts of Henry Dorgères were also members.

The UNSA drew away from the Front paysan because the Greenshirts wanted a welfare regime fully subsidized by the state, while the UNSA saw an opportunity to provide peasant welfare using a tax on the purchase of agricultural products. The alliance went into hibernation in 1936 due to differences in strategy.

Dorgères was not invited to the Peasant Congress at Caen on 5–7 May 1937 where Le Roy Ladurie, influenced by Rémy Goussault and Louis Salleron, invited the leading conservative agrarians to declare their support for corporatism. The weekly Syndicats paysans, co-edited by Salleron and Le Roy Ladurie, first appeared on 1 July 1937.

By 1938 the UNSA was the largest national peasant organization, with many of its members young and technically skilled. They were opposed to the Popular Front government which they believed aimed at the eventual collectivisation of farms and in June 1938 Le Roy Ladurie and his ally Alain de Chantérac were arrested for leading a peasant rally in Castres. However, the UNSA was mainly devoted to strengthening local corporatist agricultural groups, aiming to progressively supplant the state in managing the agricultural economy while avoiding direct confrontation.

During the Vichy Government the UNSA became subsumed by the short lived Peasant Corporation which transformed after the war into the Fédération nationale des syndicats d'exploitants agricoles (FNSEA).

== Sources ==
- Dutton, Paul V. (2002-05-16), Origins of the French Welfare State: The Struggle for Social Reform in France, 1914–1947, Cambridge University Press, ISBN 978-1-139-43296-2
- Ory, Pascal (1975), Le dorgérisme, institution et discours d'une colère paysanne (1929-1939)
- Paxton, Robert O. (1997-09-26), French Peasant Fascism : Henry Dorgeres' Greenshirts and the Crises of French Agriculture, 1929-1939, Oxford University Press, USA, ISBN 978-0-19-535474-4
- Wright, Gordon (1964), Rural Revolution in France: The Peasantry in the Twentieth Century, Stanford University Press, ISBN 978-0-8047-0190-7
