= Henri Canonge =

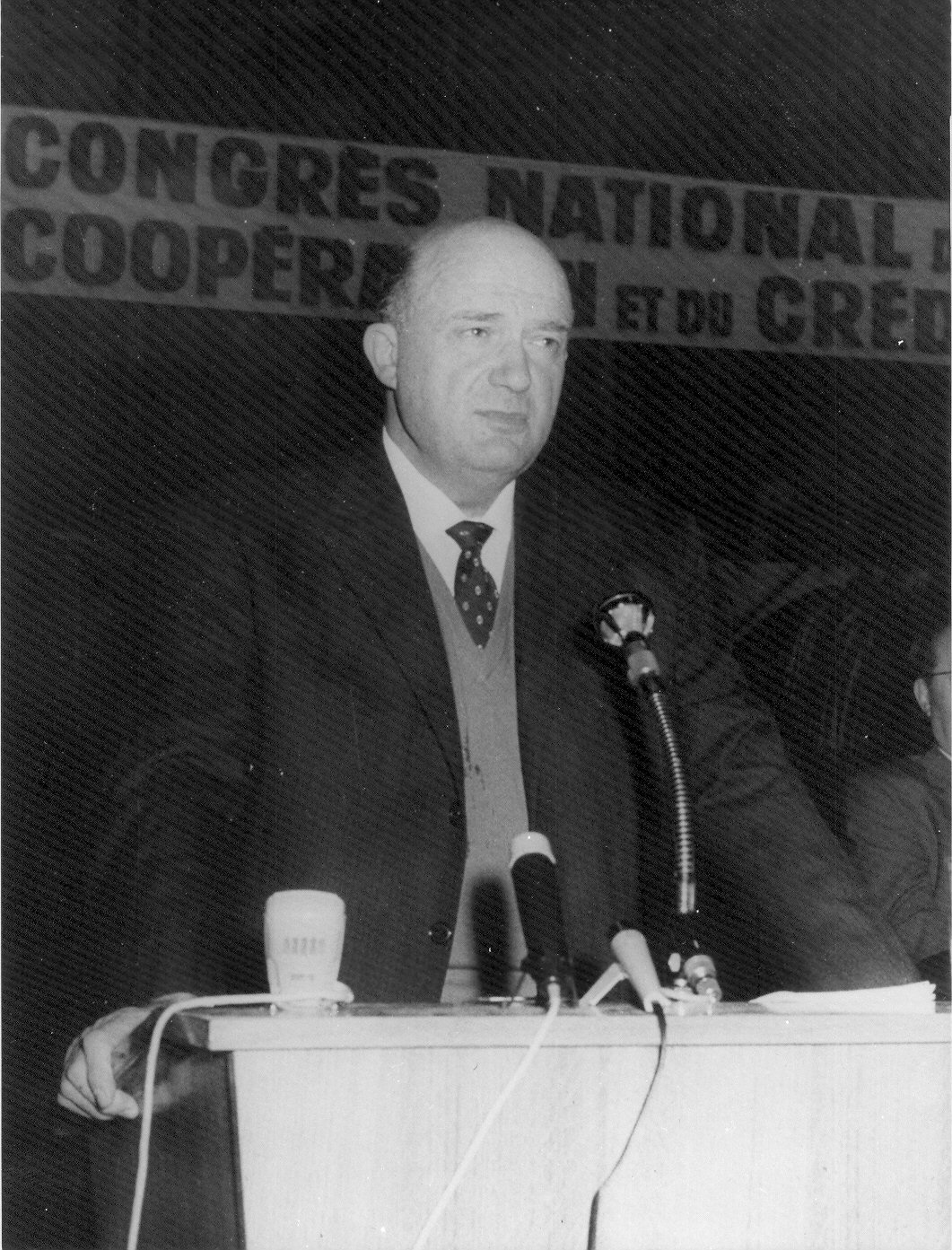
- Born: Henri Albert Canonge; May 13, 1914; Barre-des-Cévennes, Lozère, France
- Died: October 23, 1981 (aged 67); Rodez, Aveyron, France
- Occupations: Syndicalist, cooperative leader, politician
- Known for: Director of the CGA, advocate of agricultural modernization

Henri Albert Canonge (May 13, 1914 – October 23, 1981) was a French syndicalist and a prominent figure in post-war agricultural cooperatives.

== Early life ==
Henri Canonge was born to Protestant pastor Albert Adolphe Canonge (1872–1946) and Alix Rosalie Lamarche (1873–1961) in Barre-des-Cévennes, a village in Lozère, France. After studying at the Lycée du Parc in Lyon, he enrolled in the National Institute of Agronomy in 1934, graduating as an agronomist engineer.

He married Germaine Puech, niece of sculptor Denys Puech, on July 1, 1939. After her death, he remarried Ida Henriette Lambert on July 24, 1967.

== Career ==
Henri Canonge began his career at the Caisse Nationale de Crédit Agricole. He became an active member of the socialist-leaning Confédération Nationale Paysanne (CNP) in 1936.

In 1945, he served as director of the General Confederation of Agriculture (CGA). The CGA faced increasing dominance from the Fédération nationale des syndicats d'exploitants agricoles (National Federation of Farmers' Unions or FNSEA) and ceased operations in 1953.

From 1954 to 1975, Canonge was secretary-general and later director-general of the Confédération nationale de la mutualité, de la coopération et du crédit agricoles. Simultaneously, he managed the Maison du Rouergue in Paris.

== Political Contributions ==
Henri Canonge was appointed to the French Council of State in 1970 and served as a member of the European Economic and Social Committee from 1958 to 1976, chairing it from 1974 to 1976. He was also the mayor of Mont-Saint-Père from 1977 to 1978.

During the Larzac protests in the 1970s, Canonge discreetly supported farmers opposing military expansion.

== Legacy ==
Henri Canonge died on October 23, 1981, in Rodez and was buried in Bozouls. A street in Bozouls is named in his honor.
