= Jacques Le Roy Ladurie =

French politician and union leader (1902–1988)

Minister of Agriculture
- In office 17 April 1942 – 11 September 1942
- Prime Minister: Pierre Laval
- Preceded by: Pierre Caziot
- Succeeded by: Max Bonnafous

Member of the National Assembly for Calvados's 5th constituency
- In office 1958–1962
- Succeeded by: André Halbout

Personal details
- Born: Jacques Jules Marie Joseph Le Roy Ladurie; 28 March 1902 Saint-Mihiel, Meuse, France
- Died: 6 June 1988 (aged 86) Caen, Calvados, France
- Children: 4, including Emmanuel
- Occupation: Agriculturalist

Jacques Jules Marie Joseph Le Roy Ladurie (French: [ʒak ʒyl maʁi ʒozɛf lə ʁwa ladyʁi]; 28 March 1902 – 6 June 1988) was a French agriculturalist and politician. He played a leading role in agricultural syndicates in the 1920s and 1930s. During World War II (1939–1945) he was Minister of Agriculture in Vichy France for several months in 1942. He later participated in the French Resistance. After the war he was a deputy for the Calvados from 1951 to 1955, and again from 1958 to 1962.

== Early years ==
Jacques Jules Marie Joseph Le Roy Ladurie was born on 28 March 1902 in Saint-Mihiel, Meuse. His father, Captain Emmanuel Le Roy Ladurie, was stationed there with the 25th battalion of chasseurs. In the summer of that year his father was dismissed from the army for refusing to execute the government's decrees directed against religious congregations, and retired to farm his family's land in Normandy. When aged 17 and about to graduate from secondary school Jacques Le Roy Ladurie became seriously ill and was bed-ridden for several months. His doctors told him he must live an outdoor life, so after his recovery he joined the school of agriculture in Angers. He graduated in 1924.

In 1925 Le Roy Ladurie settled in an 18th-century château surrounded by a farm of 140 hectares (350 acres) owned by his maternal family at Les Moutiers-en-Cinglais. The property was located on the edge of the Caen plain and the Norman bocage, and was mostly used for wheat and cattle. It was worked by hired hands, and he had free time, particularly in winter. Soon after, he married the daughter of Viscount Dauger. Léontine Dauger was from a Catholic and royalist background. They had four children, including the future historian Emmanuel Le Roy Ladurie, who was born on 19 July 1929. His brother, Gabriel Le Roy Ladurie, became a senior officer of the Banque Worms.

== Local Political leadership ==
In 1929 Le Roy Ladurie was elected to the municipal council of Les Moutiers-en-Cinglais, and was chosen as mayor. He held this position until 1983, with only a short interruption in 1945–1947. In 1935 Le Roy Ladurie was elected president of the Calvados Chamber of Agriculture.

== The Calvados Syndicat ==
Le Roy Ladurie soon became known as an authority on "modern" agriculture. He was noticed by Henri Chéron, a former Minister of Agriculture, and at the age of 23 was made secretary of the Calvados agricultural syndicate. He was active and innovative, and changed the organization into a union of syndicates along a model proven in Lyon. He combined the services of a syndicate, a cooperative and the credit union in a "Maison de Paysan" (Peasant House). By 1931 the Calvados Union had 8,600 members in 211 municipal unions.

Le Roy Ladurie believed in the "union shop" to provide fertilizer, small equipment, insurance and groceries, but also believed peasants would always be deeply independent. He insisted that the Calvados Union should be completely neutral in politics and religious matters. He was called a revolutionary for demanding review of tenancy leases and a reactionary for opposing the extension of social insurance to agriculture.

== Union nationale des syndicats agricoles ==
In December 1931 the syndicates were dealt a blow by the failure of the Caisse centrale de Crédit agricole (Central Bank of Agricultural Credit). In the confusion that followed Le Roy Ladurie was made secretary-treasurer of the Union centrale des syndicats agricoles (UCSA, Central Union of Agricultural Syndicates). He managed to arrange support from the Banque Worms through his brother Gabriel.

In 1934 he became secretary-general of the UCSA, which was renamed the Union nationale des syndicats agricoles (UNSA, National Union of Agricultural Syndicates). Le Roy Ladurie was the General Secretary of the Front paysan that supported Henry Dorgères and his quasi-fascist Greenshirts in 1933–35. He published an article that violently attacked the government for lowering production targets at a time when there were 300,000 foreigners in France, many working "stolen" French soil and refusing to be assimilated. Le Roy Ladurie addressed 8,000–10,000 participants at the first annual conference of the Greenshirts on 11 December 1935 in Bannalec, Finistère.

Later he drew away from the Greenshirts. Where Dorgères was against the government's policy of employer-paid social welfare for peasant families, and wanted a welfare regime fully subsidized by the state, Le Roy Ladurie saw the weakness of the government plan as an opportunity for the UNSA to take over peasant welfare using a tax on the purchase of agricultural products. Dorgères was not invited to the Peasant Congress at Caen on 5–7 May 1937 where Le Roy Ladurie, influenced by Rémy Goussault and Louis Salleron, invited the leading conservative agrarians to declare their support for corporatism. The weekly Syndicats paysans, co-edited by Salleron and Le Roy Ladurie, first appeared on 1 July 1937.

Le Roy Ladurie had great energy and was a brilliant orator. He was anti-republican and a convinced corporatist. He believed that peasants should be aware of their strength, united and organized to avoid the malign interference of the republican state.

By 1938 the UNSA was the largest national peasant organization, with many of its members young and technically skilled. In June 1938 Le Roy Ladurie and his ally Alain de Chantérac were arrested for leading a peasant rally in Castres. However, he mostly devoted his energy to strengthening local corporatist agricultural groups, which would progressively supplant the state in managing the agricultural economy, but avoid direct confrontation. He was politically very conservative, and a strong supporter of the Munich Agreement of September 1938.

== World War II (1939–1945) ==
At the outbreak of World War II in September 1939 Le Roy Ladurie tried to enlist with the 36th infantry regiment in Caen but was refused due to his poor health and to being the father of four young children. In June 1940, with the collapse of resistance to the German invasion of France he considered going to London but was persuaded he would be more useful staying in France. On 8 August 1940 he wrote a report in which he argued that Germany would soon lose the war, and France should be helped to survive and to save whatever was possible. Marshal Philippe Pétain, who had been a classmate of his father in war college, read the report at once and became friendly with Le Roy Ladurie.

In December 1940 Pétain offered Le Roy Ladurie the Ministry of Agriculture in the new government being formed by Pierre-Étienne Flandin. He refused because the position did not include authority for Supplies, which he saw as inextricably linked, and because he distrusted the extreme collaborationist faction led by Henri Martin. In the summer of 1941 Le Roy Ladurie accepted a position on the Council of Economic Studies. On 17 April 1942 he accepted the position of Minister of Agriculture and Secretary of State for Agriculture & Supplies in the cabinet of Pierre Laval, on condition that he would stay clear of political issues. Le Roy Ladurie soon came into conflict with Laval over German demands for workers and agricultural produce. He resigned in frustration on 11 September 1942.

Increasingly hostile to the collaborationist regime, Le Roy Ladurie joined the Organisation civile et militaire of the French Resistance under the command of Maxime Blocq-Mascart. In 1943 he created the mouvement "Volontaires ouvriers et paysans". He took the pseudonym Captain Lempereur, and fought with the FFI in the maquis around Orléans.

== Imprisonment ==
After the Liberation of France Le Roy Ladurie was imprisoned in June 1945 for having served as a minister in Vichy France. The charges were dismissed six months later by the High Court of Justice in view of his resistance activity, but his participation in Vichy handicapped his future political career. He soon regained his positions in the agricultural syndicate of Calvados and the regional chamber of agriculture for Normandy, and in 1947 again became mayor of Moutiers-en-Cinglais.

== Electoral career ==
He was elected deputy in 1951 under the label of the Union of Independent and Republican Nationals, a group that campaigned for amnesty for participants in the Vichy regime. It was closely associated with Parti Paysan d'Union Sociale, the successor to the pre war French Agrarian and Peasant Party which he had worked with in the Front paysan. They both were later absorbed into the National Centre of Independents and Peasants.

He failed to be reelected on 2 January 1956 but in 1958 he was elected deputy for the 5th district of Calvados, but again failed to win reelection in 1962.

== Death ==
He died on 6 June 1988 in Caen, Calvados, aged 86.

== Publications ==
- Jacques Le Roy Ladurie (1936), preface, Initiation sociale du jeune paysan, by G. de Coupigny, Paris: Librairie agricole et horticole de la maison rustique, p. 119
- J. Le Roy Ladurie, ed. (1937), La Terre : encyclopédie paysanne, Paris: Flammarion
- Jacques Le Roy Ladurie (1937), Les Syndicats paysans dans la nation, Lagny: impr. de E. Grévin et fils, p. 47
- Jean de Guébriant; Jacques Le Roy Ladurie (1937), Vers une politique paysanne, Paris: Flammarion, p. 64
- Jacques Le Roy Ladurie (1938), preface, Le Porc et le mouton en plein air, by J. Legrand, Paris: E. Flammarion, p. 101
- Jacques Le Roy Ladurie (1942), Produire ou mourir, Lyon, Information de l'État français, p. 16
- Jacques Le Roy Ladurie (1943), preface, L'Assurance mutuelle agricole, by Roger Breton, Paris: les Publications sociales agricoles (impr. de A. Devrue), p. 80
- Georges Monnet; J. Le Roy-Ladurie; Marcel Roclore (1950), Le Communisme et les paysans, Paris: impr. de Maréchal, p. 32
- Jacques Le Roy Ladurie (1954), preface, Le Camembert de Normandie, by F. Alba, Caen: J. Le Moulec (impr. de Caron), p. 58
- Jacques Le Roy Ladurie (1994), preface, Nos plus longs mois, by François-Alexandre James (2 ed.), Ussy: J. James, p. 463
- Jacques Le Roy Ladurie (1997), Emmanuel Le Roy Ladurie; Anthony Rowley (eds.), Mémoires 1902-1945, Paris: Flammarion : Plon, p. 497

== Sources ==
- Assouline Pierre (1997-04-03), "Le paysan de Vichy", L'Express (in French)
- Barral, Pierre (2008), "Un normand de fort caractère : Jacques Le Roy Ladurie: Xavier Walter, Paysan militant. Jacques Le Roy Ladurie 1925-1940", Annales de Normandie (in French), 58 (1–2)
- Chaubin, Hélène, LE ROY LADURIE Emmanuel, Bernard (in French), Association Maitron Languedoc-Roussillon
- Collectif (2005). "Le Roy Ladurie (Jacques Jules Marie Joseph)". Dictionnaire des parlementaires français de 1940 à 1958 (in French). Paris: La Documentation française. ISBN 2-11-005990-7.
- Dutton, Paul V. (2002-05-16), Origins of the French Welfare State: The Struggle for Social Reform in France, 1914–1947, Cambridge University Press, ISBN 978-1-139-43296-2
- Kalman, Samuel (2008), The Extreme Right in Interwar France: The Faisceau and the Croix de Feu, Ashgate Publishing, Ltd., ISBN 978-0-7546-6240-2
- Lyne, Thomas Gerard (1986), The politics of Agriculture: Le Mouvement pour le Defence de le Exploitation Familial, 1959-1982 (PDF), Warwick University
- Paxton, Robert O. (1997-09-26), French Peasant Fascism : Henry Dorgeres' Greenshirts and the Crises of French Agriculture, 1929-1939, Oxford University Press, USA, ISBN 978-0-19-535474-4
- Walter, Xavier (2008), PAYSAN MILITANT JACQUES LE ROY LADURIE 1925-1940 (in French)
- Wright, Gordon (1964), Rural Revolution in France: The Peasantry in the Twentieth Century, Stanford University Press, ISBN 978-0-8047-0190-7
