= FNMA (disambiguation) =

FNMA is the Federal National Mortgage Association, also called Fannie Mae.

FNMA may also refer to:

- Malanje Airport, by ICAO code
- Fundo Nacional do Meio Ambiente (National Environmental Fund); see List of federal institutions of Brazil
- Fédération nationale de la mutualité agricole (National Federation of Agricultural Reciprocity); see Confédération Nationale de la Mutualité, de la Coopération et du Crédit Agricoles
