= Caziot =

Caziot (French: [kazjo]) is a French surname. Notable people with the surname include:

- Pierre Caziot (1876–1953), French agricultural engineer and politician
- Eugène Caziot (1844–1931), French malacologist
