= Arboretum du Puy Chabrol =

Arboretum in Corrèze, Limousin, France

Arboretum du puy Chabrol
- Interactive map of Arboretum du puy Chabrol
- Type: Arboretum
- Location: Pérols-sur-Vézère, Corrèze, France
- Coordinates: 45°40′12″N 2°1′30″E
- Area: 38 hectares (94 acres)
- Created: 1919
- Status: 1 June - 30 September

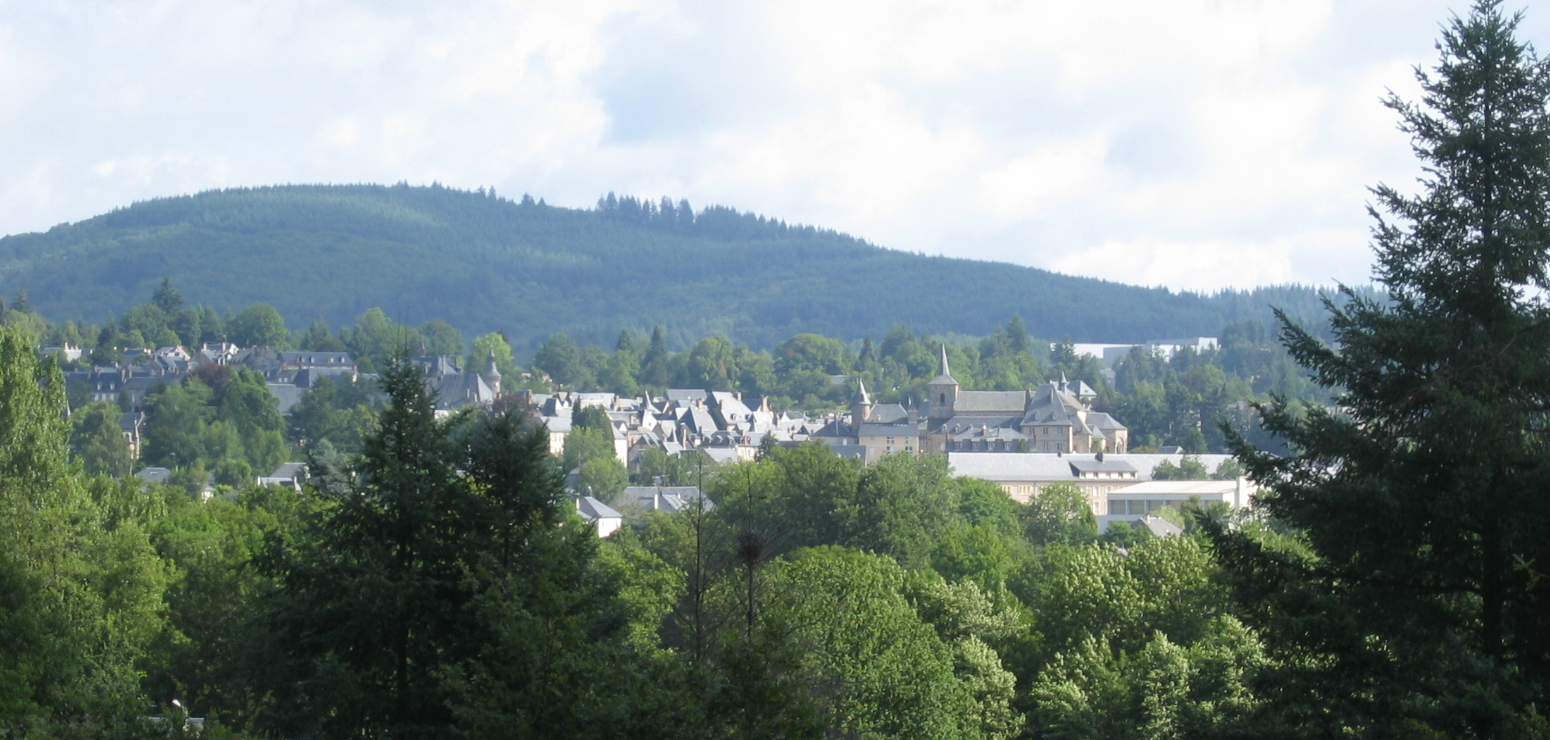
View of Meymac near the Arboretum du Puy Chabrol

The Arboretum du Puy Chabrol (38 hectares) is an ancient arboretum located near the community of Barsanges, northwest of Meymac, Corrèze, Limousin, France. It contains approximately 400 exotic species.

== History ==
The arboretum was created between World War I and World War II by Marius Vazeilles (1881-1973), a naturalist and forestry expert. In 1919, he left his job in the Water and Forests Administration to set up a nursery, then he became an expert in forest resources in Meymac.

Marius Vazeilles developed a planting programme at Puy Chabrol of nearly 400 new forest species from five continents, unknown in the region, especially conifers, and planted 18 hectares of arboretum.

== Collections ==
The arboretum is a mix of native natural species and rare species. It is home to many varieties of trees and shrubs and herbaceous plants in the undergrowth. It has about 400 exotic species, mainly conifers.

== See also ==
- List of botanical gardens in France

== Biography ==
- Marius Vazeilles, Le Plateau de Millevaches: Historique de sa mise en valeur, Conférence faite à la cérémonie de remise des insignes d'Officier de la Légion d'Honneur le 29 mars 1958. Eyboulet, Ussel, 17 pages, 1958. Contains a two-page map of the Arboretum du Puy Chabrol.
- Gilbert Pons, Le paysage: sauvegarde et création, Editions Champ Vallon, 1999, page 99. ISBN 978-2-87673-285-8.
- Revue historique de l'armée; revue trimestrielle de l'état-major de l'armée, service historique, France Armée, Ministère de la guerre (France), 1945, page 162.
- Comptes rendus des séances de l'Académie d'agriculture de France, Académie d'agriculture de France, 1949, page 104.
- Comptes rendus des séances de l'Académie d'agriculture de France, Académie d'agriculture de France, 1973, page 987.
- Marius Vazeilles
- Mémoire Ouvrière en Limousin | Marius Vazeilles
- Arbres Remarquables (French)
