= Meymac =

- Commune
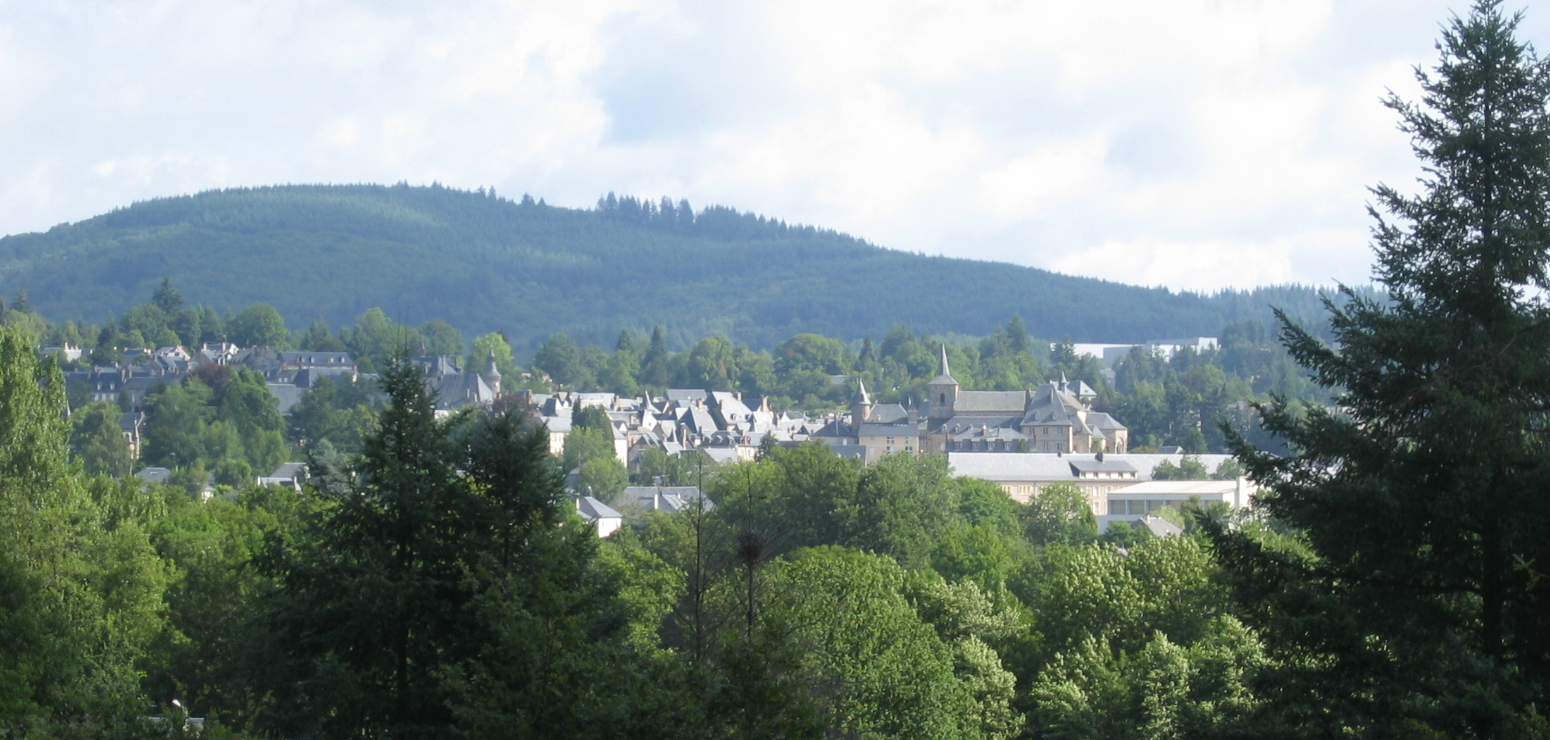
- A general view of Meymac

- Coat of arms
- Location of Meymac
- Location within France Location within Nouvelle-Aquitaine
- Coordinates: 45°32′12″N 2°08′52″E
- Country: France
- Region: Nouvelle-Aquitaine
- Department: Corrèze
- Arrondissement: Ussel
- Canton: Plateau de Millevaches
- Intercommunality: Haute-Corrèze Communauté

Government
  - Mayor (2026–32): Philippe Brugère
- Area^{1}: 87.15 km^{2} (33.65 sq mi)
- Highest elevation: 973 m (3,192 ft)
- Lowest elevation: 593 m (1,946 ft)
- Population (2023): 2,389
  - Density: 27.41/km^{2} (71.00/sq mi)
- Time zone: UTC+01:00 (CET)
  - Summer (DST): UTC+02:00 (CEST)
- INSEE/Postal code: 19136 /19250
- ^{1} French Land Register data, which excludes lakes, ponds, glaciers > 1 km^{2} (0.386 sq mi or 247 acres) and river estuaries.

Meymac (French pronunciation: [memak]; Occitan: Maismac) is a commune in the department of Corrèze, in central France. The inhabitants of Meymac are called Meymacois and Meymacoises.

== History ==
According to the cartulary of the Abbey of Saint-Pierre d'Uzerche, a hermit named Mammuscus settled there and Bishop Rorice II of Limoges consecrated the chapel that the former had founded in 546. However, the origin of the name Meymac comes more likely from Maximus, the name of a Roman character and the Gallo-Roman suffix -acum. In 1085, Archambaud III, Viscount of Comborn, founded a monastery at Meymac but it became an abbey in 1147, a dependancy of the abbey at Uzerche. At the beginning of the 12th-centuary, relics of Saint Leger were received by the abbey as a gift. The abbey then saw many pilgrims flock. In 1265, Eble VII of Ventadour granted the inhabitants a charter of franchises. Meymac became a town protected by ramparts. In 1379, during the Hundred Years War, the city was plundered by Geoffroy Tête-Noire and English backed routiers. In anticipation of the Estates General of 1789, Martin Thomas was elected as a deputy of the clergy. In 1846, the communes of Saint-Germain-le-Lièvre and Meymac merged. During the Hundred Years' War it was pillaged by Rodrigo de Villandrando.

=== Second World War ===
On 21 February 1944, the Francs-Tireurs et Partisans (FTP) resistance fighters blew up a train carrying German army weapons and equipment from Limoges at the Farges viaduct. There were no casualties. On Wednesday, 19 April 1944, several dozen people who were rounded up the day before, were taken to Meymac station and sent, via Limoges to the Drancy internment camp, and on to the extermination camps. These people — adults and children — were Jewish or considered Jewish under the laws of the Vichy regime. They had been living for a few years or a few months in Meymac, Maussac or Égletons. Two commemorative plaques were affixed to Meymac station in 2003 and 2015. From June to August 1944, the Jesser Brigade was deployed in the region to respond to the actions of the Limousin maquis in the upper Corrèze.

On 12 June 1944, a group of 47 German soldiers and a suspected French collaborator were executed near Meymac by French Resistance forces. They were taken prisoner during the Battle of Tulle on 8 and 9 June 1944. Although the resistance fighters responsible for this act had originally decided never to talk about it, the last of them, Edmond Réveil, ended up revealing the existence of this mass grave in 2023 — which had already been excavated in 1969.

== Geography ==
The commune lies just south of the Millevaches Plateau and northwest of the Cantal mountains. On the territory of the commune is the highest point in the department, Mont Bessou at 977 metres.

Three rivers cross the commune, the Vézère, the Luzège and the Triouzoune. They are symbolized on the city's coat of arms. The Luzège has its source in the northern part of the commune; it flows south through the middle of the commune and crosses the town. The Triouzoune forms most of the commune's eastern boundary.

== Population ==
Historical population
Year	Pop.	±% p.a.
1968	2,410	—
1975	2,434	+0.14%
1982	2,523	+0.51%
1990	2,796	+1.29%
1999	2,627	−0.69%
2007	2,643	+0.08%
2012	2,449	−1.51%
2017	2,366	−0.69%
2023	2,389	+0.16%
Source: INSEE

== Culture and heritage ==
=== Monuments and places ===
- Abbaye Saint-André de Meymac in Meymac - was classified as a historical monument in 1840 by Prosper Mérimée. On 3 February 1085, Archambaud III, Viscount of Comborn, founded a church and a priory, where the rule of Saint Benedict was followed, and which became an abbey in 1146.
  - The Centre d'art contemporain de Meymac - an art gallery in the wing of the abbey, parallel to the church.
  - Musée d'archéologie et du patrimoine Marius-Vazeilles - Place du Bûcher, archaeology museum installed in the wing of the abbey adjoining the church which housed the chapter house and the monks' dormitory.
- The Statue of the Black Madonna - 12th-centuary, classified as a historical monument, restored and visible since 2016, is the only one of its kind in Corrèze.
- The Hôtel-Dieu (rebuilt in 1681) - the pediment is engraved: Hospitum hic, alibi patria which means : " An asylum, the homeland is elsewhere ". Since 2015, it has been the home to an inter-municipal cultural facility, Le Pôle Culturel Clau del País.
- La Halle - A hall dating from the 15th-centuary, its location was on the right side of the church. Rebuilt in 1826, it was moved to its current location. The slate roof dates from 1880, the old one was made of shingles. Nice framework.
- Rue Neuve - One of the houses of the Ventadour's, watchtower, doors, windows formerly mullioned. Door of the 16th-centuary.
- Rue Saint-Pierre - An old half-timbered house and turgotière, the name given to the places in the region in which Turgot became interested when he was intendant of the Generalitat of Limoges.
- Rue de Lachenal - Old canal with mills, 17th-centuary tower house.
- L'Hôtel de Ville - Town hall located on the site of the old castle where, in 1795, five people were guillotined, it was rebuilt in 1932 after the previous building burned down.
- Le beffroi - Watchtower of the old fortification of the 15th-centuary.
- Château des Moines-Larose - In 1878, Jean Gaye-Bordas, a wine merchant, bought the land adjacent to the abbey and had a turreted house built in the neo-medieval style. Its ground floor now houses the entrepreneurial Third place, Au Beau MilLieu.
- Numerous bourgeois houses of Corrèze wine merchants built at the end of 19th and 20th-centuries, in the village, in the commune or in the canton. When they are embellished with towers or turrets, they are locally called château's.
- The Prieuré du Jassonneix - a priory, active, installed since 1981 in the former castle of the same name.
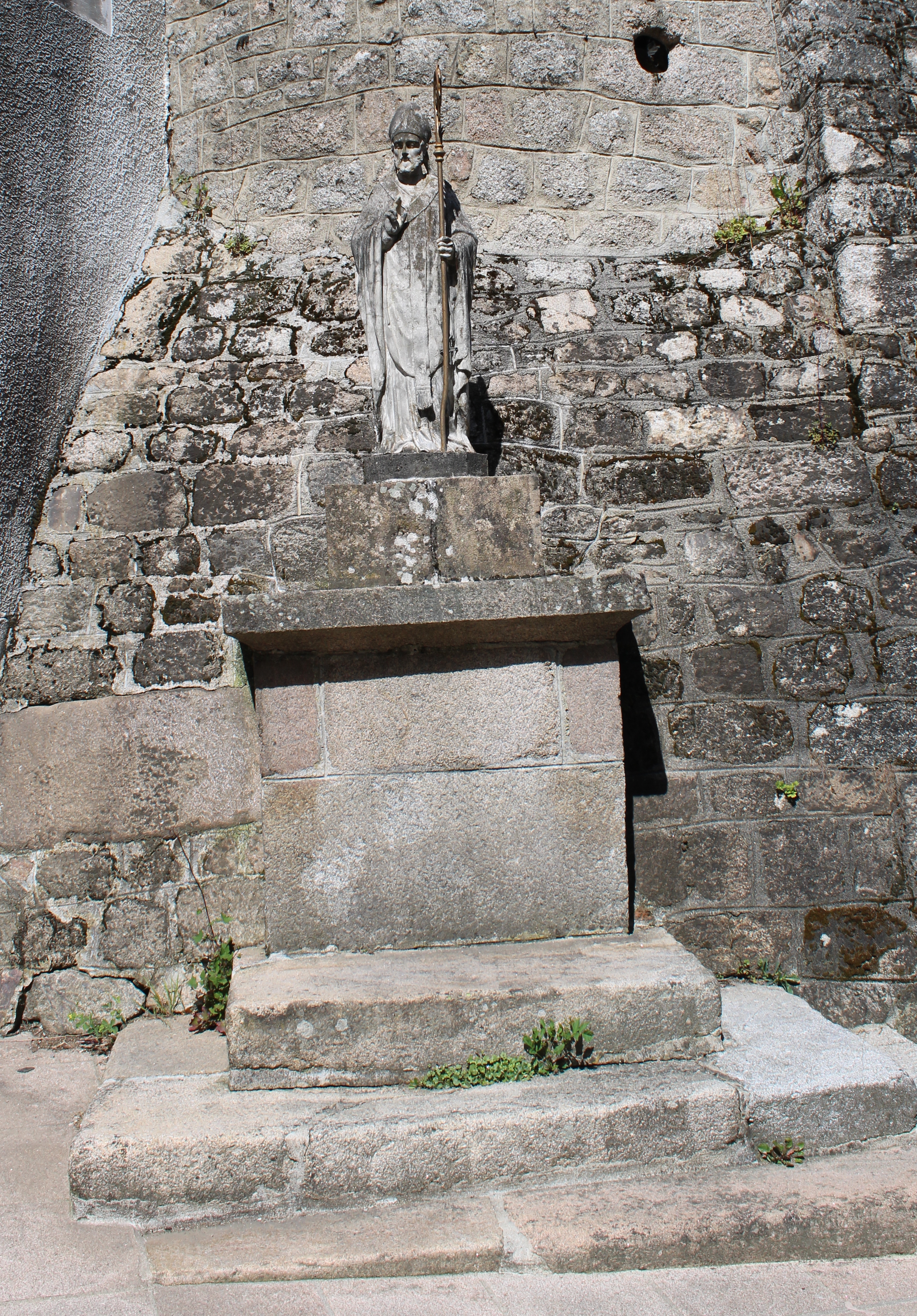
At the foot of the belfry-clock, statue of Saint Leger, patron saint of the city.

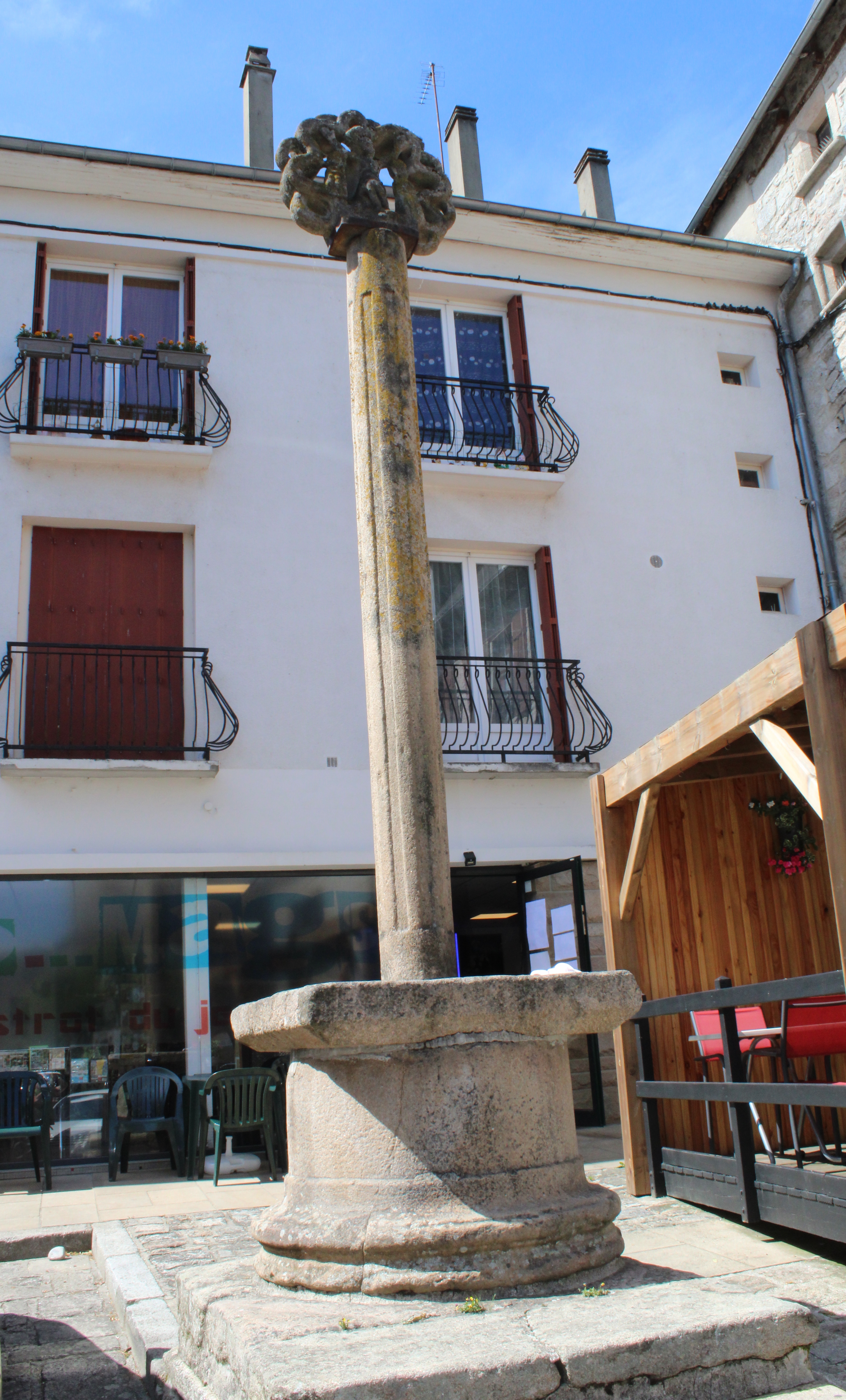
One of Meymac's Calvaries.

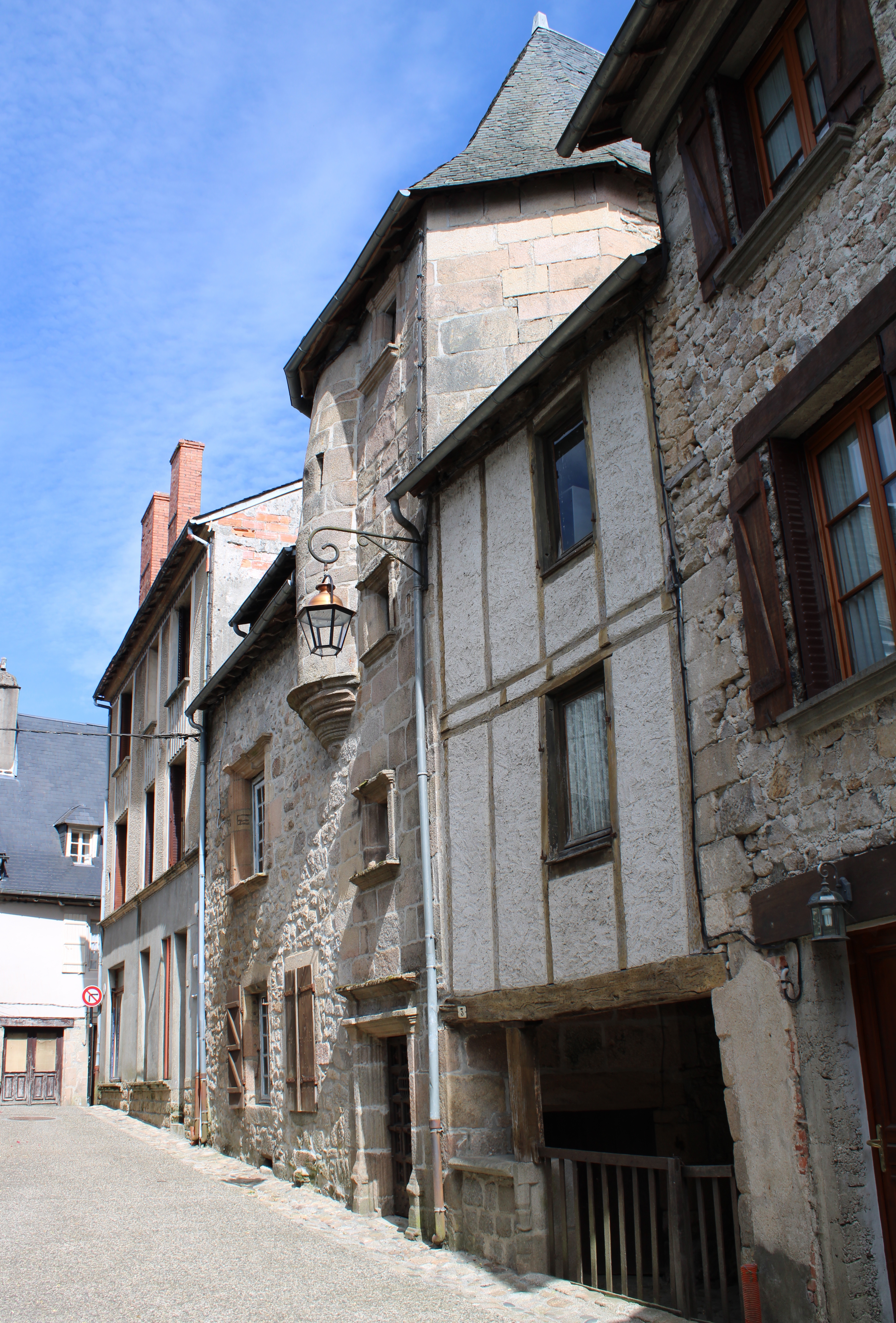
An old street in the city.

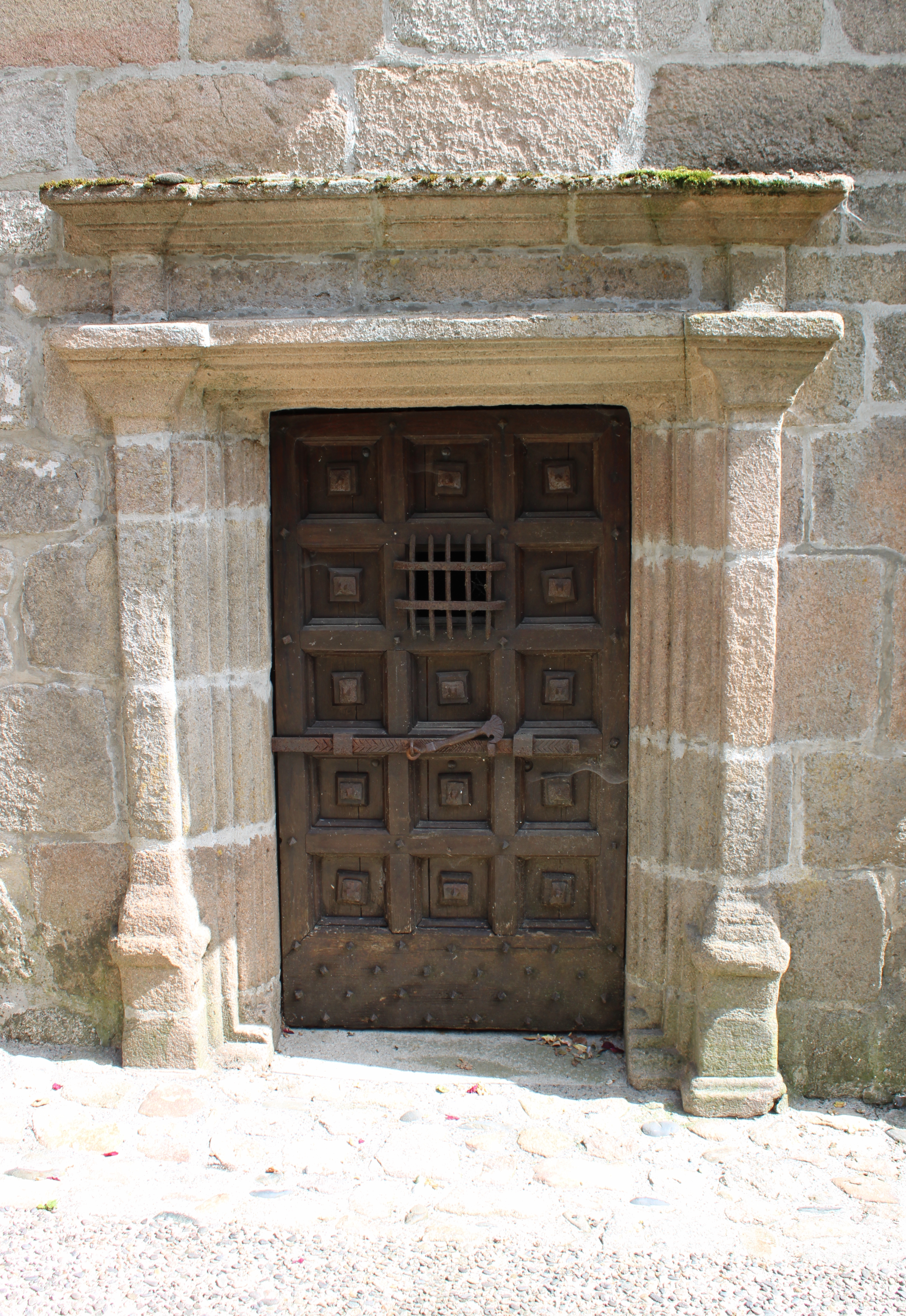
Renaissance style door.

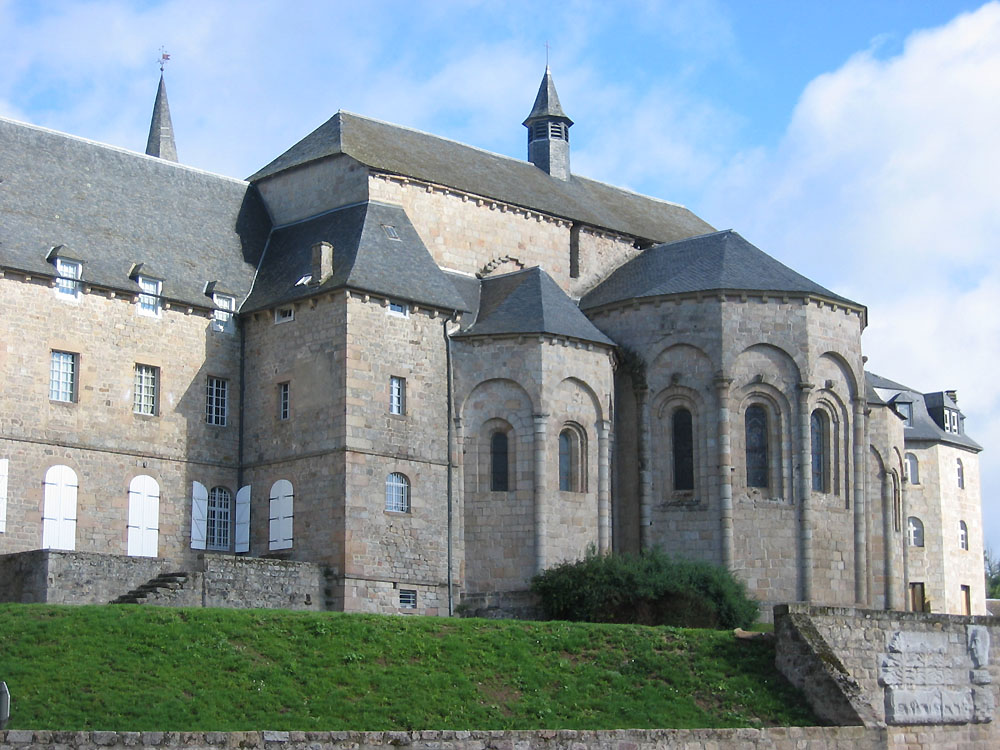
The apse of the church.

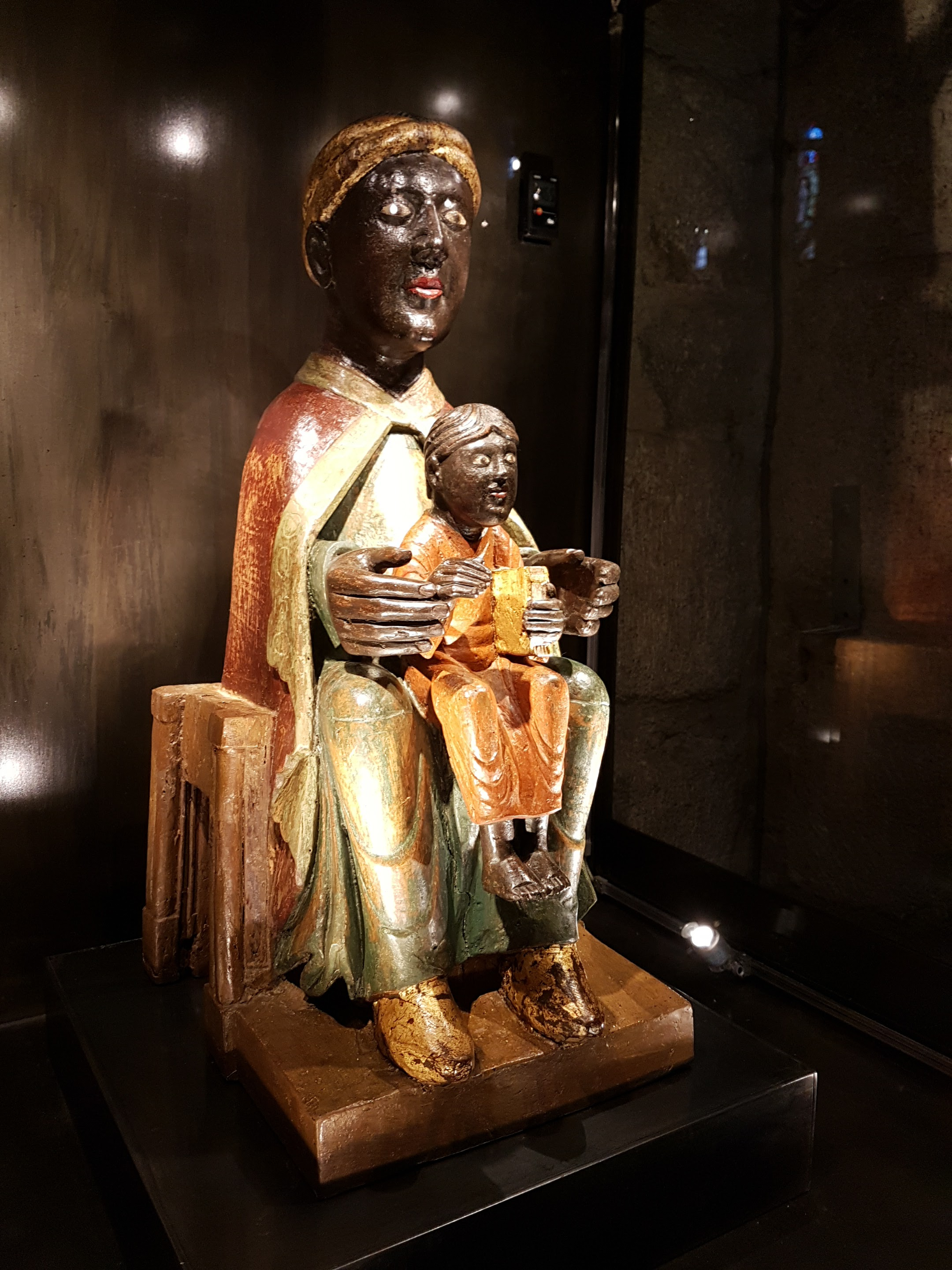
Statue of the Black Madonna.

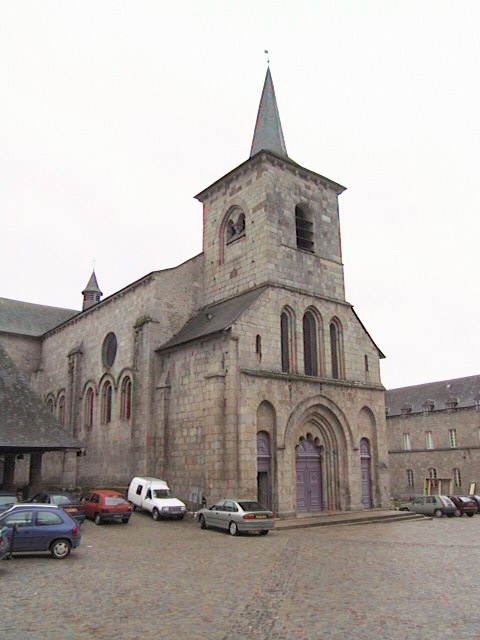
The bell tower-porch of the abbey church of Saint-André-Saint-Léger.

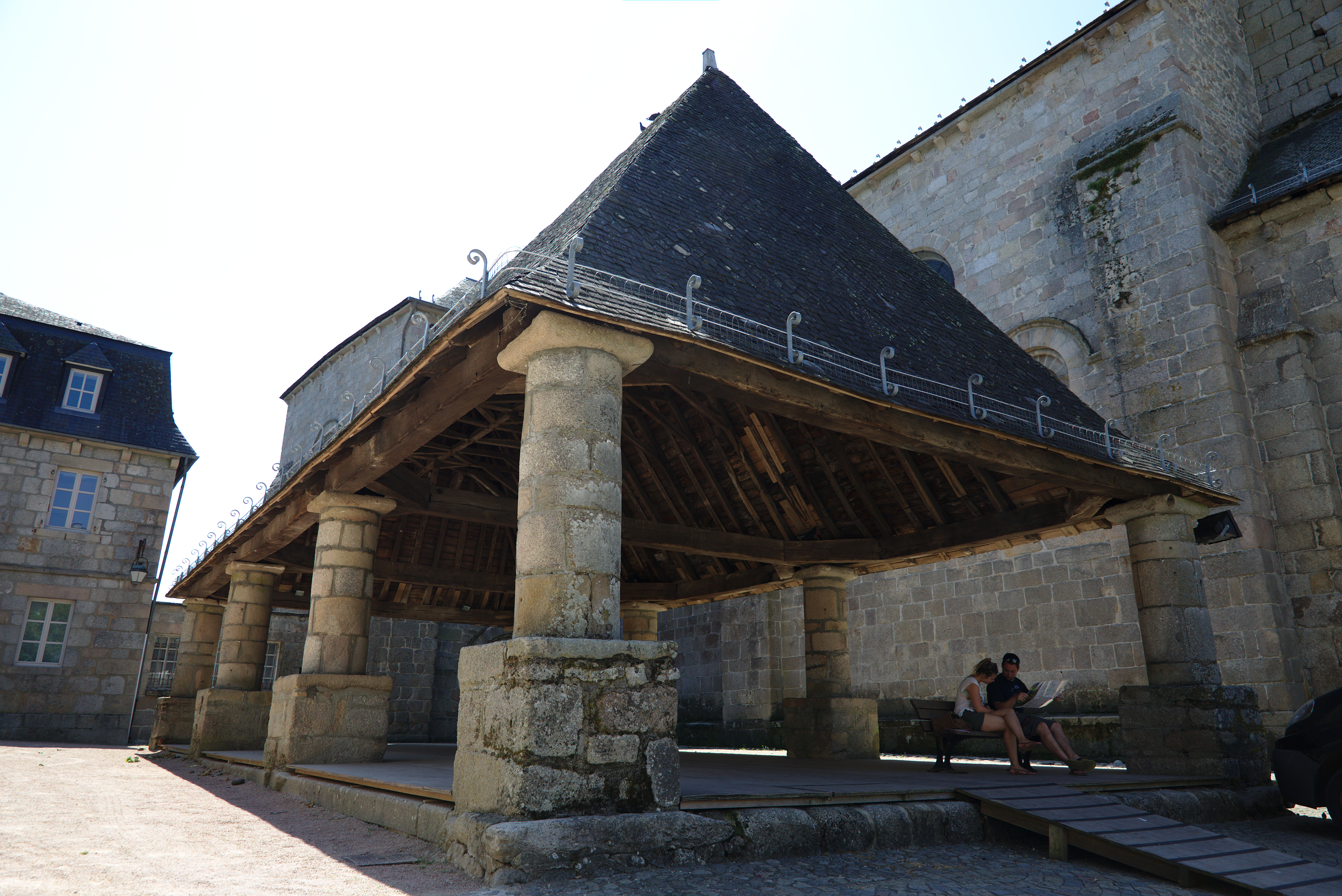
Market hall.

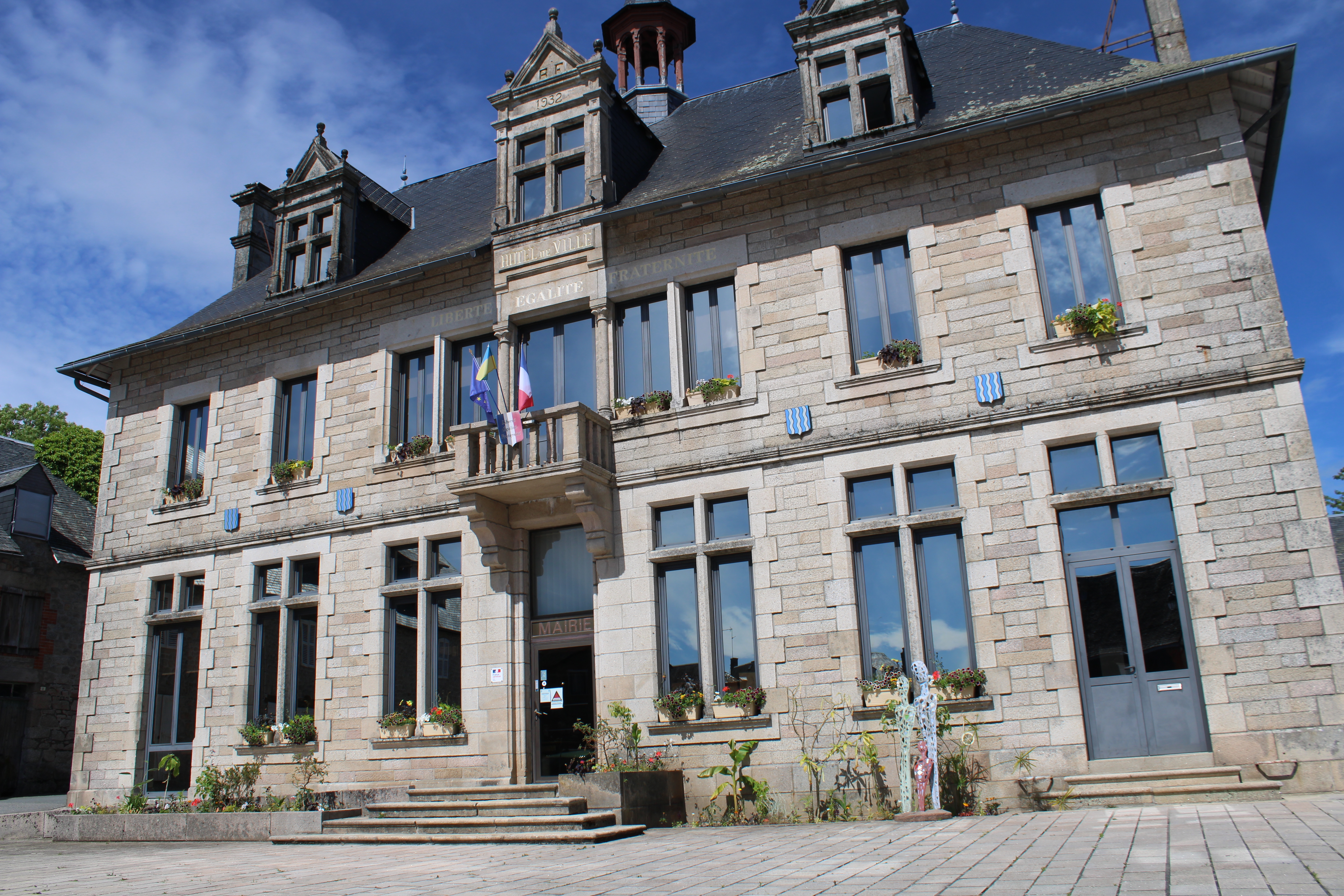
Town Hall.

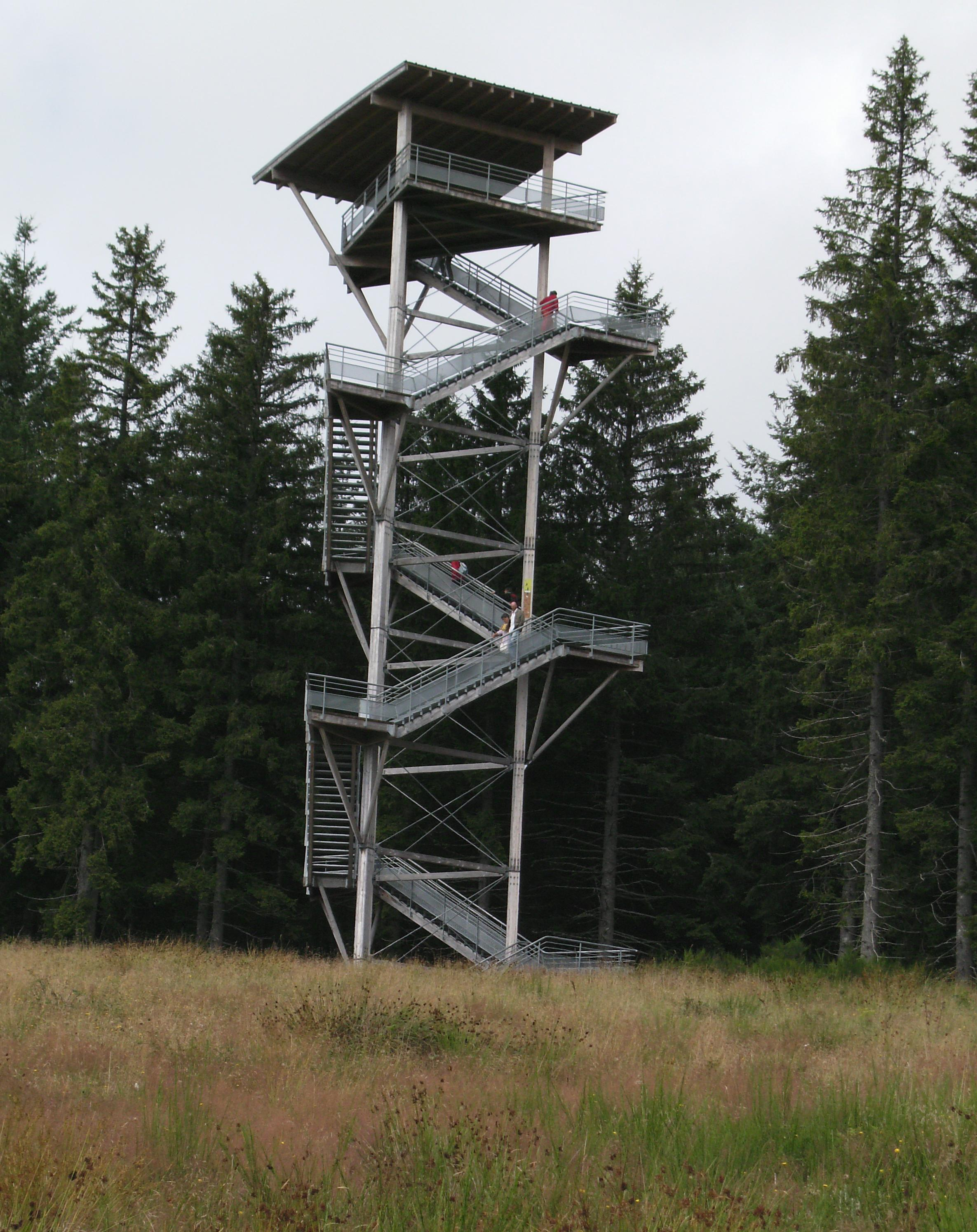
Mont Bessou viewing tower at the highest point on the Plateau de Millevaches.

=== Notable people ===
- Léger d'Autun - martyred bishop of the 7th-centuary, an urn containing his supposed skull being kept in the abbey church of Meymac, with the following inscription: Cranio Sancti Leodegarii augustodumensis epis.mar
- Rodrigue de Villandrando (c. 1378-1448), leader of a famous mercenary band in the Middle Ages, who ransomed the town of Meymac.
- François Hédelin (1604-1676) - French playwright and theoretician of the theatre (17th century), former abbot of Meymac.
- Pierre Jean Treich des Farges (1754-1821) - general of the armies of the Republic, was born and died there.
- Martin Thomas (1754-1832), parish priest of Meymac and deputy of the clergy at the Estates General of 1789.
- Émile Cardot (1850-1922), curator of Water and Forests in Pontarlier and author of numerous books, was particularly interested in the reforestation of the Millevaches plateau.
- Jean Gaye-Bordas, born in 1826, died in 1900, wine merchant and creator of the Bordeaux wine trade ; After him, this trade developed, becoming very flourishing in the region.
- Alméry Lobel-Riche, French painter and engraver, born on 3 mai 1880 in Geneva, died in 1950 in Paris, and buried in Meymac where he came regularly. A painting depicting The Exodus, restored, can be seen at the Clau del país cultural centre.
- Georges Saupique (1889-1961) - French sculptor who created the war memorial.
- Mathieu Léon Gasparoux, born in Meymac, a soldier shot as an example during the First World War, as was Léonard Leymarie, another Corrèze native.
- Marius Vazeilles, (1881-1973) died in Meymac, agronomist, forestry expert, peasant trade unionist, archaeologist and ethnologist and communist deputy of the Popular Front. The Museum of Archaeology and Heritage, located in a wing of the Abbey of Saint-André, bears his name.
- Righteous Among the Nations:
  - Marguerite Wajdenfeld, née Lemoine, for having allowed herself to be arrested with her husband during the roundup of 19 April 1944, in order to protect two Jewish children hidden in their home — medal awarded on 19 September 1989.
  - Jean Melon and Suzanne Melon, née Hohenauer, for having saved Ida Musler from the round-up of the 19 April 1944, medal awarded on the 7 novembre 2005.
- Jacques Chirac - general councillor of the canton of Meymac (1968 to 1979) and deputy for Corrèze (constituency of Ussel).
- Jean-Yves Riocreux, bishop of Pontoise and then of Basse-Terre, studied at the forestry school.

== Infrastructure ==
=== Transportation ===
==== Railway ====
It was in 1883 that the Limoges-Meymac line arrives at Meymac. Meymac station is located on one of the main transversal lines. The Lyon-Bordeaux line, which had a branch to Limoges via Meymac. The express service between Bordeaux and Clermont-Ferrand was called Ventadour. The station and its branch line were a notable railway junction during the PO and PLM eras.

Meymac station remains today an important station of the Transport express régional network (TER). Meymac has a second stop to the north-west of the town, at the Gare de Jassonneix, on the line to Limoges. Brive-la-Gaillarde station can be reached from Meymac.

==== Roads and highways ====
The D 979 (formerly RN 679) which links Limoges to Bort-les-Orgues crosses the commune.

Access to the A89 autoroute via exit 23 (Ussel-Ouest) is located in the commune of Saint-Angel, 8 km to the south.

== Sights ==
- Arboretum du Puy Chabrol
- Douglaseraie des Farges
- Mont Bessou viewing tower

== See also ==
- Communes of the Corrèze department
- Raymond Couvègnes
