= UCSA =

UCSA may refer to:

- Uniform Controlled Substances Act
- University of California Student Association
- University of Canterbury Students' Association
- Union centrale des syndicats agricoles
