= Roger Grand =

French historian, archivist and politician (1874–1962)

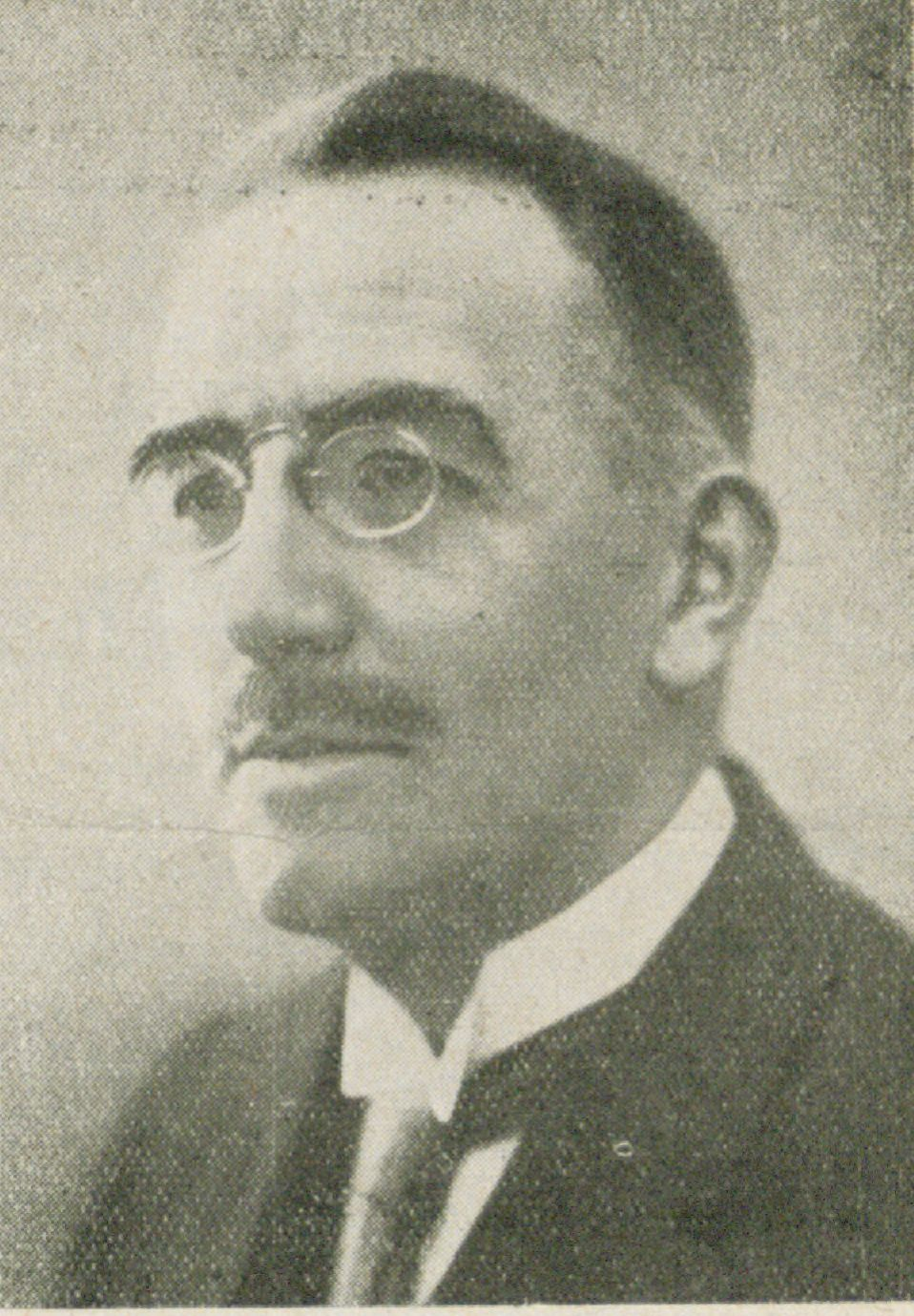
- Grand in 1928

Senator for Morbihan
- In office 28 August 1927 – 9 January 1933
- Preceded by: Ernest Lamy

National Council Member
- In office 22 January 1941 – 1943

Member of the Brittany Advisory Committee

Personal details
- Born: 3 September 1874 Châtellerault (Vienne, France)
Died
26 May 1962 (aged 87)
- Party: UR
- Education: École nationale des chartes
- Profession: Archivist; Historian; Farmer

Roger Grand was a French legal historian and politician, born in Châtellerault on 3 September 1874 and died in Paris on 26 May 1962.

== Biography ==
A graduate of the École nationale des chartes, he earned the title of archivist paleographer with a thesis titled Contribution to the History of Land Tenure Systems: The Complant Contract.

After working as a trainee lawyer he worked as an archivist at Seine-et-Oise, Cantal, where he helped establish the Société de la Haute-Auvergne, and then Nantes. Eyesight issues forced him to retire as an archivist and turn to farming.

His eyesight meant that he couldn't fight in the First World War and became an auxiliary, working as an agricultural specialist to keep up crop yields on the home front. In 1919 he became a professor of civil law and canon law at the École nationale des chartes.

While also working as a farmer, he took on union responsibilities as president of the Union nationale des syndicats agricoles between 1934 and 1938. He served as a senator for Morbihan from 1927 to 1933.

He was a disciple of Frédéric Le Play.

The Académie française awarded him the Hercule-Catenacci Prize in 1952 for his work Une race, un château: Anjony, in the Land of Auvergne Mountains.

In 1954, he was elected to the Académie des Inscriptions et Belles-Lettres. His academic sword was crafted by the sculptor Philippe Besnard.

== Works ==
- The "Paix" of Aurillac: Study and Documents on the History of Municipal Institutions of a Consular Town ( ), Paris, 1945.

– Gobert Prize from the Académie des Inscriptions et Belles-Lettres.

- Agriculture in the Middle Ages from the End of the Roman Empire to the 16th century (with contributions from Raymond Delatouche), E. de Boccard, 1950.
- A Race, a Castle, Anjony, Paris, Picard, 1951.

== Honors ==
- Officer of the Légion d'honneur (7 February 1952)
- Officier of Public Instruction
- Knight of the Order of Agricultural Merit
