= François Tanguy-Prigent =

French politician (1909–1970)

François Marie Tanguy Prigent

Minister of Agriculture
- In office 4 September 1944 – 22 October 1947
- Leader: Charles de Gaulle
- Preceded by: Pierre Cathala
- Succeeded by: Marcel Roclore

Minister of Veterans and War Victims
- In office 1 February 1956 – 13 June 1957
- Prime Minister: Guy Mollet
- Preceded by: Vincent Badie
- Succeeded by: André Dulin

Personal details
- Born: 11 October 1909 Saint-Jean-du-Doigt, Finistère, France
- Died: 20 January 1970 (aged 60) Morlaix, France

François Marie Tanguy Prigent (French pronunciation: [fʁɑ̃swa maʁi tɑ̃ɡi pʁiʒɑ̃]; 11 October 1909 – 20 January 1970) was a French Socialist politician who became a resistance fighter during World War II (1939–45). He was Minister of Agriculture from September 1944 to October 1947 and was Minister of Veterans and War Victims from February 1956 to June 1957.

== Early years ==
François Tanguy-Prigent was born to a farming family on 11 October 1909 in the small town of Saint-Jean-du-Doigt, in the Finistère department of Brittany. He worked on the land from the age of 12 to 26, when he was elected to the legislature. He joined the French Section of the Workers' International (SFIO) in 1926. He undertook his military service in Paris in 1930–31, and on return became an active SFIO militant. In 1933–34 he played a major role in creation of the Fédération paysanne du Finistère, an agricultural union affiliated with the CNP, of which he became a national director.

In 1934 Tanguy-Prigent was elected councilor general for the canton of Lanmeur, but was not yet 25 so was unable to take his seat. He was reelected in March 1935. That year he became municipal councilor and then mayor of Saint-Jean-du-Doigt. He would hold these positions until his death, except during the Vichy France period.

On 3 May 1936 Tanguy-Prigent was elected deputy to the National Assembly for the 1st district of Morlaix in the second round of voting. He joined the Socialists in the chamber. For the next four years Tanguy-Prigent was particularly involved in agricultural issues. He attended agricultural conferences in Geneva (1937), Prague (1938) and Dresden (1939). He was strongly opposed to the Munich Agreement, and in May 1940 volunteered to fight with the 31st regiment of dragoons. He was one of the 80 deputies who refused to vote to give full powers to Marshal Pétain on 10 July 1940.

== World War II Resistance ==
Tanguy-Prigent returned to farming in Saint-Jean-du-Doigt. He was arrested by the Germans from 6–23 September 1940. Tanguy-Prigent opposed the policies of Vichy by all legal means. At the same time he joined the Resistance, notably in Libération Nord under the resistance name of "Jacques Le Ru". He narrowly escaped arrest in the summer of 1943 and went into hiding with his wife. He also founded the Resistance Paysanne newspaper. For many months he helped put in place the structure of Armée secrète (the secret army) for the 19 departments in the northwest of France. In summer 1944 he personally fought with the French Forces of the Interior to liberate the Morlaix region. In August that year, he participated in the arrest of peasant populist and former Vichy official Henry Dorgères.

== Later career ==
Tanguy-Prigent represented Finistère as a member of the first and second National Constituent Assemblies, and was a deputy for Finistère from 1946 to 1958. He was named Minister of Agriculture by General Charles de Gaulle, holding office from September 1944 to October 1947. He was Minister of Supplies from November 1945 to January 1946. He dissolved the Vichy regime's Peasant Corporation in September 1944, but the unity of agricultural organizations that it had established persisted. He replaced the Corporation with a national union of working farmers rather than landowners, the General Confederation of Agriculture (GCA). In March 1946 the CGA became the Fédération nationale des syndicats d'exploitants agricoles (FNSEA). Many of the former Peasant Corporation leaders became leaders of the FNSEA.

Tanguy-Prigent was Minister of Veterans and War Victims from February 1956 to June 1957. He was again deputy for Finistère from 1962 to 1967.

Tanguy-Prigent died on 20 January 1970 in Morlaix.

== Sources ==
- Assemblée nationale, Tanguy PRIGENT DIT TANGUY-PRIGENT FRANÇOIS (in French)
- Gildea, Robert (2013-07-30), Marianne in Chains: Daily Life in the Heart of France During the German Occupation, Henry Holt and Company, ISBN 978-1-4668-5021-7
- Jolly, Jean (1960–1977), dictionnaire des parlementaires français de 1889 à 1940 (in French), vol. VII, Paris: Presses universitaires de France, ISBN 2-1100-1998-0
- Paxton, Robert O. (1997-09-26), French Peasant Fascism : Henry Dorgeres' Greenshirts and the Crises of French Agriculture, 1929-1939: Henry Dorgeres' Greenshirts and the Crises of French Agriculture, 1929-1939, Oxford University Press, USA, ISBN 978-0-19-535474-4
- "PRIGENT (Tanguy, François, Marie dit TANGUY-PRIGENT François)", Biographie de la IVe République (in French)
