= Pierre Caziot =

French agricultural expert and administrator

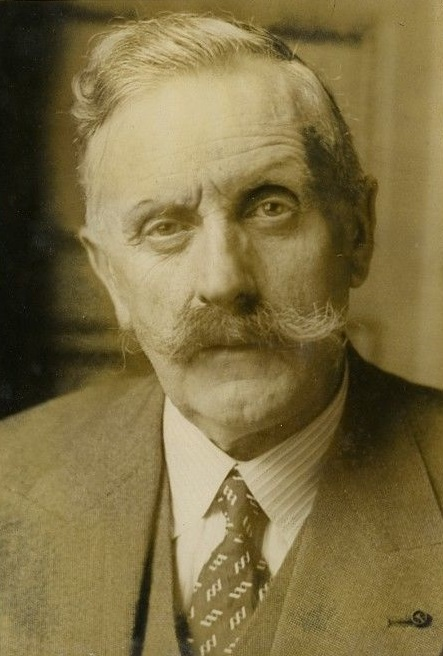

Minister of Agriculture and Supplies (or Secretary of State)
- In office 12 July 1940 – 18 April 1942
- Prime Minister: Philippe Pétain
- Preceded by: Albert Chichery
- Succeeded by: Jacques Le Roy Ladurie

Personal details
- Born: 24 September 1876 Crézancy-en-Sancerre, Cher, France
- Died: 4 January 1953 (aged 76) Paris, France

Pierre Caziot (French: [pjɛʁ kazjo]; 24 September 1876 – 4 January 1953) was a French agricultural expert and administrator who was Minister of Agriculture and Supplies in the Vichy government during World War II (1939–45). He was a strong believer in the value of the peasant-owned family farm, and promoted the "back to the land" policies of Marshal Philippe Pétain during the war.

== Agricultural expert (1876–1939) ==
Pierre Caziot was born in Crézancy-en-Sancerre, Cher, on 24 September 1876. Caziot ran a 30 hectares (74 acres) farm there that his family had owned for nearly 600 years. He became well known as a farmer and agricultural engineer, and was a member of the Academy of Agriculture. In 1919 he attacked the agrarian collectivism that the Left was advocating, and the move towards large, mechanized farms that some technocrats favored. Both would turn peasants into an agrarian proletariat. He argued that for a peasant to be attached to the soil he had to own his plot of land.

In 1920 he wrote a tract in which he asserted that the family farm was the perfect basis for sound agriculture and a healthy nation. The state should consolidate land units that were too small and break up large units into farms suitable for one family. He also called for regional land societies. The state-subsidized societies would be organization by farmers associations. They would have the power to buy and restructure farmland as it became available and resell it on easy terms to peasant farmers or the sons of peasants. The proposal was reviewed favorably by the committee on agriculture of the Chamber of Deputies, but was not put to the vote.

Caziot joined the Crédit Foncier in 1924. He became a high official in the Credit Foncier, the government land bank that Napoleon III had established.

== World War II (1939–45) ==
=== Ministerial appointments ===
Caziot was named Minister of Agriculture and Supplies on 12 July 1940. He learned of his appointment from a neighbor, who had heard the news on the radio. Caziot hesitated to accept the unexpected offer of the Ministry of Agriculture, since he was deeply hostile to the Germans, but soon overcame his scruples. He insisted that a separate ministry take responsibility for the supply of food. Caziot was Minister of Agriculture and Supplies from 12 July 1940 to 6 September 1940, then Secretary of State for Agriculture and Supplies from 6 September 1940 to 13 December 1940 in the government of Marshal Philippe Pétain. In December 1940 the secretariat of supplies was detached from the ministry. Caziot was Minister and Secretary of State for Agriculture from 13 December 1940 to 18 April 1942 in the governments of Pétain and François Darlan. He was succeeded by Jacques Le Roy Ladurie, who was also a passionate agrarian. Le Roy Ladurie was younger, and more of a progressive corporatist.

=== Return to the land ===
Caziot believed in regionalism, seeing the traditional provinces as natural cultural and economic units, which he said were "drawn from the very entrails of the soil." He promoted the "return to the land" and implemented measures to curb migration to the cities and to encourage creation of family farms. Caziot wrote of the challenge he faced when he took office,

The unoccupied zone produced chiefly wine, fruit and vegetables, lacking the basic foods such as grains, meat and milk products... Without deliveries from the occupied zone there would be famine at the end of three months... If we were to avoid imminent disaster it was necessary at all costs and with the greatest urgency to bring the workers back to their farms in order to harvest the crops and prepare for the next plantings.

Caziot offered subsidies to peasants if they returned from the cities to work on unused land, provided loans on easy terms for modernization of rural houses, created a law on education to train more agronomists and to give rural children in basic education in agricultural technology, and implemented reforms to discourage the break-up of farms and to encourage the regrouping of scattered land holdings. Caziot said after the war, "It was necessary to concentrate all my efforts on the task of giving the farm families of France a realization of their strength and a new pride in their life, for they and they alone were to preserve France and to bring it to a re-birth whatever happened."

=== Peasant Corporation ===
Caziot promulgated the law of 2 December 1940 that organized the Peasant Corporation. Although he was in favor of a national peasant organization, he accepted the word "corporation" only at Pétain's insistence. The concept was that each community would have a "corporative syndicate" of all peasant families, grouped into regional "corporative unions" which would meet periodically in a National Corporative Council. Caziot lacked enthusiasm for corporatism and delayed implementation of the Peasant Corporation. He appointed a provisional national organizing committee on 21 January 1941. His commission, headed by Count Hervé Budes de Guébriant, was mostly made up of leading conservative landowners and took nearly two years to develop the legislation that became effective on 16 December 1942.

=== Jewish question ===
In October 1941 Caziot wrote to the Commissioner-General for Jewish Questions, Xavier Vallat, protesting against the effect his Aryanization and spoliation measures were having on the productivity of Jewish farmers and agricultural projects. In December 1941 Vallat proposed in the State Council a motion to reduce participation of Jews in agriculture, limiting them to a single plot of land and banning them from positions of responsibility. Caziot opposed the law, which he felt was against the best interests of the nation due to the agricultural crisis. In January 1942 he said individuals should be encouraged to return to the land whatever their "race or religion". In January 1942 he forced Vallat to make an exception for the Jews of Vaucluse, who had lived there for centuries.

Caziot's sole priority was to boost agricultural output. He wanted to keep the best qualified people in each job whatever their religion. He often succeeded in keeping Jews in senior positions in agriculture in defiance of Vallat's rulings. However, he had no interest in helping Jews unless they were useful in agriculture. In November 1941 he protested against the release of Jews who had no agricultural training from foreign workers' camps to work on projects for the Mission for the Restoration of Farming.

== Last years (1945–53) ==
Caziot was tried by the High Court on 19 March 1947 for his participation in the Vichy government and sentenced to national degradation for life and loss of his property. He was pardoned after a telegram from Otto Abetz was found in the Nazi archives demanding his arrest for hostility to collaboration. He died in Paris on 4 January 1953.

== Publications ==
Caziot's publications include:

- Pierre Caziot (1914), La Valeur de la terre en France, description des grandes régions agricoles et viticoles, prix et fermages des biens ruraux, Encyclopédie agricole, publiée par une réunion d'ingénieurs agronomes sous la direction de G. Wery (in French), M. Gauwain, preface, Paris: J.-B. Baillière et fils, p. 450
- Pierre Caziot (1919), Une solution du problème agraire. La terre à la famille paysanne (in French), Paris: Payot, p. 160
- Pierre Caziot (1923), La Valeur d'après-guerre de la terre. Conférence faite à Bordeaux, le 25 juin 1923, sur l'initiative du groupe des ingénieurs-agronomes du Sud-Ouest (in French), Bordeaux: impr. nouvelle F. Pech, p. 27
- Pierre Caziot (1924), Expertises rurales et forestières. Traité pratique d'estimation de la propriété rural, Encyclopédie agricole. Publiée sous la direction de M. Wéry (in French), Couronnée par l'Académie des sciences morales et politiques et par l'Académie d'agriculture, Paris: impr. Jouve et Cie; libr. J.-B. Baillière et fils, p. 432
- Pierre Caziot (1926), La vérité sur la richesse agricole (in French) (3 ed.), Paris: Librairie agricole de la Maison rustique, p. 39
- Pierre Caziot (1927), Le Problème de l'habitation (in French), Paris: l'auteur, p. 20
- Pierre Caziot (1935), preface, Le Métayage. Ce qu'il faut en savoir, by Pierre Rouveroux (in French), Paris: Librairie agricole de la Maison rustique, p. 309
- Pierre Caziot (1937), La Propriété bâtie hors de l'économie nationale (in French), Paris: impr. de Lang, Blanchong et Cie, p. 47
- Pierre Caziot (1941), L'Agriculture française dans l'économie européenne (in French), Paris: impr. P. Boll, p. 18
- Pierre Caziot (1941), preface, Combustibles de remplacement. Utilisation rationnelle du bois de chauffage, by Tony Ballu (in French), Paris: impr. Crété, p. 63
- Pierre Caziot (1941), Au service de la paysannerie (in French), Paris, Clermont-Ferrand: F. Sorlot, p. 128
- Pierre Caziot (1942), Agriculteurs, voici ce qu'en un an le Gouvernement du Maréchal a fait pour vous (in French), Vichy: Édition du Secrétariat général a l'information et a la propagande, p. 47

== Sources ==
- "Caziot Pierre". B&S Encyclopédie (in French). B&S Editions.
- Davies, Peter (2002), The Extreme Right in France, 1789 to the Present: From de Maistre to Le Pen, Psychology Press, ISBN 978-0-415-23981-3
- Golan, Romy (1995), Modernity and Nostalgia: Art and Politics in France Between the Wars, Yale University Press, ISBN 978-0-300-06350-9
- Lackerstein, Debbie (2013-07-28), National Regeneration in Vichy France: Ideas and Policies, 1930–1944, Ashgate Publishing, Ltd., ISBN 978-1-4094-8297-0
- Lee, Daniel (2014), Pétain's Jewish Children: French Jewish Youth and the Vichy Regime, OUP Oxford, ISBN 978-0-19-870715-8
- Moulin, Annie (1991-10-24), Peasantry and Society in France Since 1789, Cambridge University Press, ISBN 978-0-521-39577-9
- "Pierre Caziot (1876-1953) - Auteur du texte" (in French). BnF.
- "Pierre CAZIOT" (in French). Ministère de l’agriculture, de l’agroalimentaire et de la forêt. Archived from the original on 2016-03-06.
- Wright, Gordon (1964), Rural Revolution in France: The Peasantry in the Twentieth Century, Stanford University Press, ISBN 978-0-8047-0190-7
