= Confédération générale des paysans travailleurs =

The Confédération générale des paysans travailleurs was a syndicat agricole affiliated to the French Communist Party and allied to the pro-Soviet Red Peasant International.

It was founded by the archeologist and forester Marius Vazeilles.

Communism particularly in the 1920s was self-consciously an urban phenomena, but there was seen to be a rural proletariat that could be organised and the powerful syndicat agricoles that tended to be inspired by Catholic social teaching and affiliated to and often led by the local aristocracy was seen as hard to infiltrate.
