= Douglaseraie des Farges =

Coordinates: 45°32′19″N 2°8′44″E

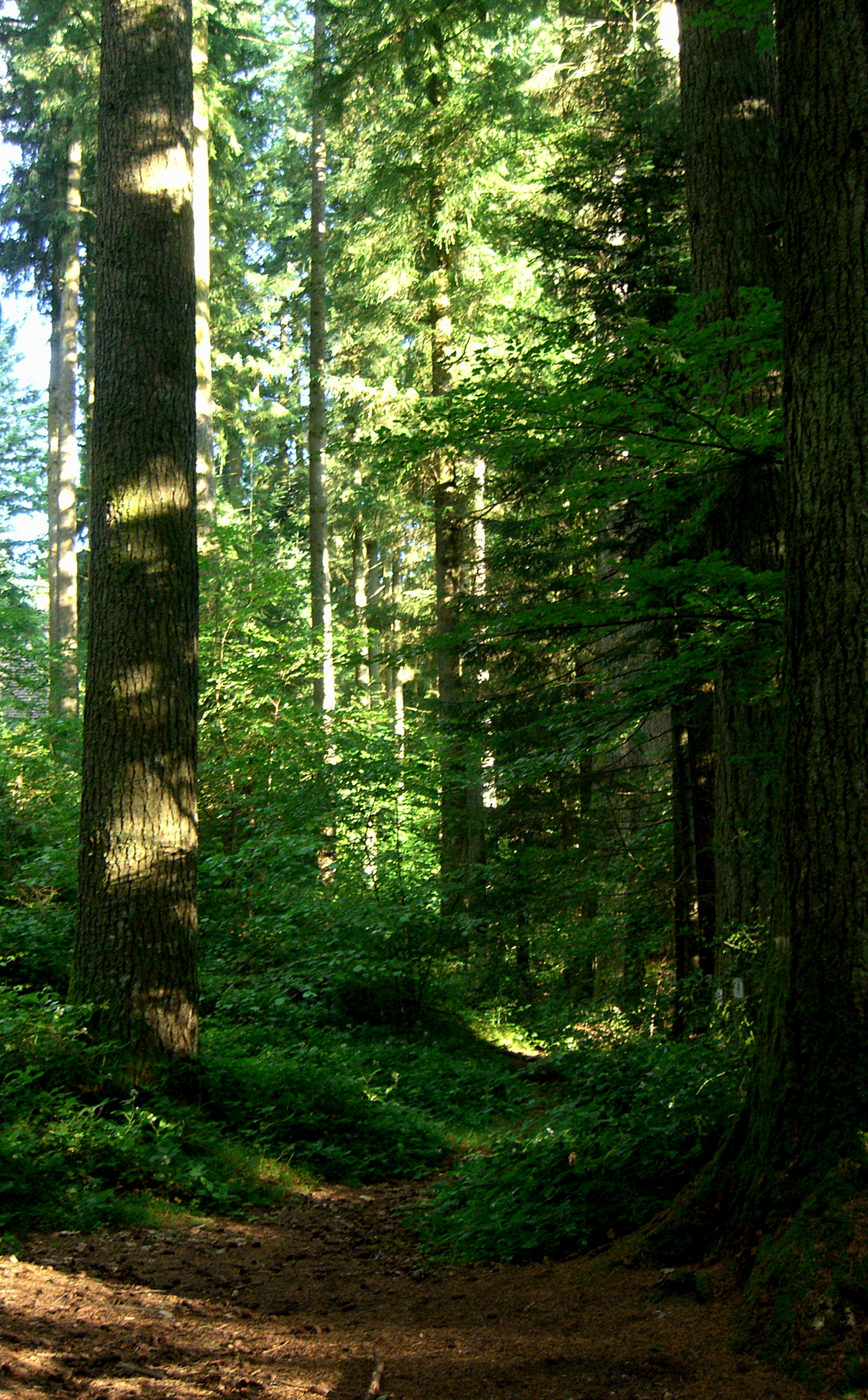
Douglaseraie des Farges

Douglaseraie des Farges is a French state-owned forest of ten hectares located in Meymac, Corrèze.

Douglaseraie des Farges was planted in 1895 with Pseudotsuga menziesii (Coast Douglas-fir). These trees can reach heights of up to 50 metres (164 ft.) and a canopy volume up to 15 m³ (530 ft³). They have measured ten trees; the highest ones were 56 m (184 ft.) with a diameter of 1.04 m (3.4 ft.):

- circumference from 3.7 m (12 ft.) to 3.79 m (12.5 ft.).
- diameter from 0.97 m (3.1 ft.) to 1.17 m (3.8 ft.).
- height from 43.4 m (142.4 ft.) to 56.80 m (186.3 ft.).
