= Meymac Abbey =

Abbey in Meymac, France

Coordinates: 45.5352°N 2.1481°E

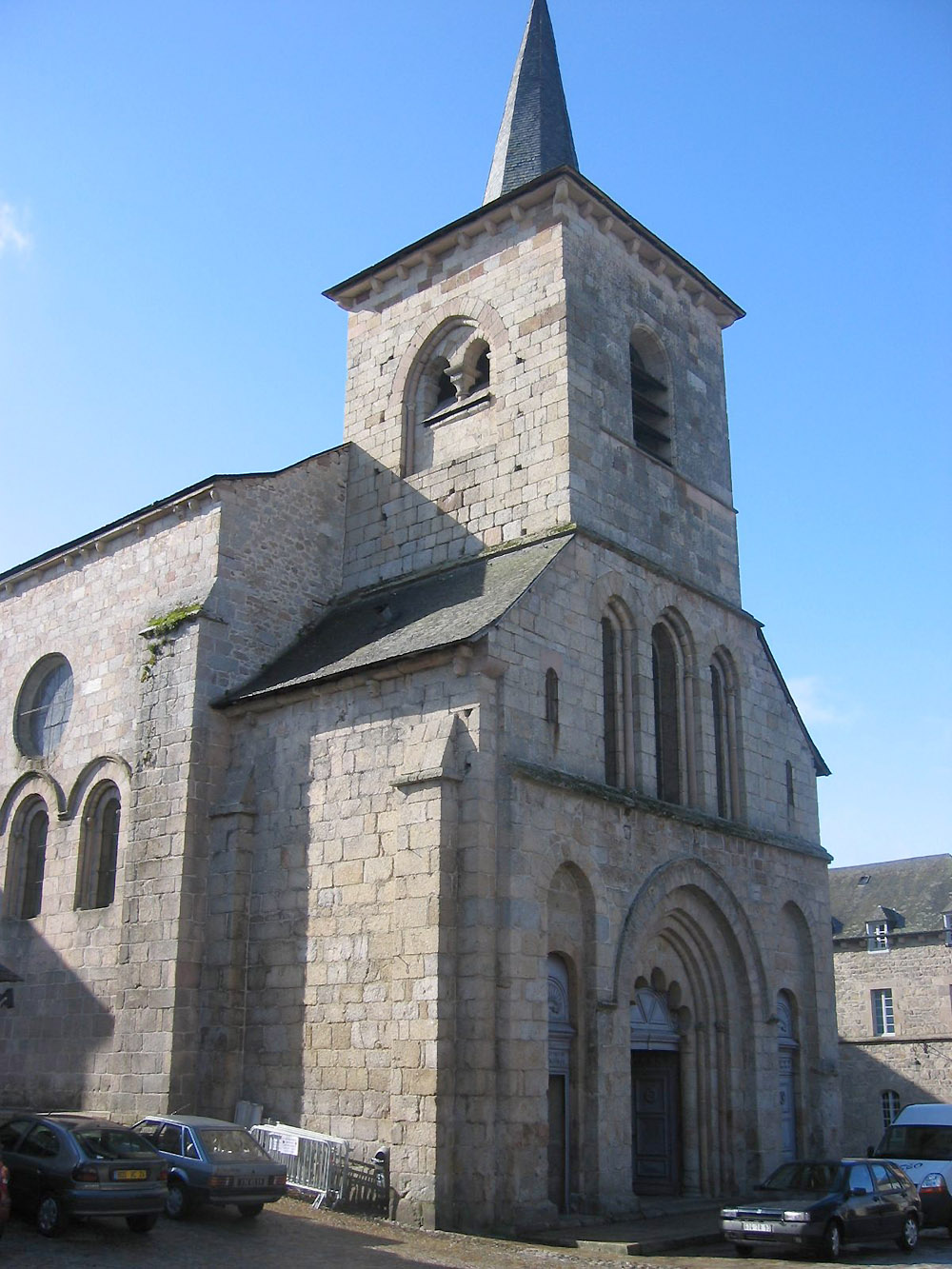
The porch of the Meymac Abbey

Meymac Abbey (French: Abbaye Saint-André de Meymac) is a 13th-century Benedictine abbey located in Meymac, France.

The original monastery on the site was founded in the 10th century by Vicomte de Comborn. Construction of the abbey started in the 12th century but was not entirely completed until the 13th century.

The building was listed for heritage protection in 1840.

== See also ==
- List of Benedictine monasteries in France
