= Confédération générale de l'agriculture =

Short-lived association of syndicats agricoles

General Confederation of Agriculture
- Confédération générale de l'agriculture
- Abbreviation: CGA
- Formation: March 1945
- Dissolved: 1953
- Type: Agricultural union
- Purpose: Advocacy for agricultural modernization and farmer protection
- Region served: France
- Leader: Henri Canonge
- Main organ: FNSEA (subsequently dominant branch)

The General Confederation of Agriculture (CGA) was a short lived national association of syndicats agricoles to replace the Vichy regime's Corporation Paysanne after the Liberation of France.

== History ==
The CGA originated from the Confédération nationale paysanne (CNP), a socialist-leaning underground union comprising mainly SFIO (socialist) and radical activists. In 1944, the CNP began publishing a newspaper, La Résistance Paysanne. Key socialist figure François Tanguy-Prigent became minister of agriculture in the Provisional Government of the French Republic on 4 September 1944.

The CGA was officially established in March 1945 to unite agricultural sectors, including unions, mutual aid organizations, and cooperatives. Initially, the CGA prospered due to resources obtained from the dissolution of the Corporation Paysanne.

In March 1946, the Fédération nationale des syndicats d'exploitants agricoles (National Federation of Farmers' Unions or FNSEA) was created as a CGA branch, but it soon dominated the confederation. Political tensions between the PCF and SFIO weakened the CGA, which became dormant in 1953.

Henri Canonge, the CGA's sole director, humorously described the organization's mission as: "Article 1: Dissolve the Corporation Paysanne. Article 2: Reinstate it."

== Function ==
The CGA aimed to unify agricultural organizations, akin to how the CGT unified labor unions. It advocated for agricultural modernization and farmer protection within a directed economy framework.

The CGA comprised:

- A syndicalist group with:
  - Federations for farmers (future FNSEA), agricultural workers, technicians, and rural artisans
  - Youth organizations (later the Centre national des jeunes agriculteurs)
- A cooperative group with:
  - Federations for cooperation, mutual aid, and agricultural credit

The organization struggled with internal conflicts between socialist and communist factions. The FNSEA, often led by former members of the Corporation Paysanne, eventually overshadowed the CGA.

== Decline ==
The CGA's six-year struggle ended with the FNSEA absorbing its representative union functions, while cooperative and mutual aid federations returned to their independent operations.

Though short-lived, the CGA influenced agricultural policy and union structures in post-war France. Its decline marked the rise of the FNSEA as France's dominant farmers' union.

== Sources ==
- Gildea, Robert (2013-07-30), Marianne in Chains: Daily Life in the Heart of France During the German Occupation, Henry Holt and Company, ISBN 978-1-4668-5021-7
- Paxton, Robert O. (1997-09-26), French Peasant Fascism : Henry Dorgeres' Greenshirts and the Crises of French Agriculture, 1929-1939: Henry Dorgeres' Greenshirts and the Crises of French Agriculture, 1929-1939, Oxford University Press, USA, ISBN 978-0-19-535474-4
