= Hervé Budes de Guébriant =

French engineer

- Born: 20 August 1880; Saint-Pol-de-Léon, Brittany, France
- Died: 30 June 1972 (aged 91); Saint-Pol-de-Léon, Brittany, France
- Occupation: Engineer

Count Hervé Budes de Guébriant (20 August 1880 – 30 June 1972) was a French agricultural engineer.

== Life ==
Hervé Budes de Guébriant was born in Saint-Pol-de-Léon, Brittany, in 1880. He was the eldest son of Alain de Guébriant, an aristocrat and large landowner who was mayor and general councilor of the town. He decided to become expert in agriculture, and obtained a diploma from the National Institute of Agronomy in Paris in 1903. He adopted the ideas of social Catholicism, and in 1911 he founded the first agricultural mutual accident insurance fund. He favored the creation of municipal unions led by a peasant elite committed to developing Breton agriculture. After World War I (1914–18) he became president of the fund. From 1919 to 1941 he chaired the Office Central de Landerneau, which later became Triskalia, a Breton agricultural cooperative.

Hervé de Guébriant initiated an agrarian revival in the inter-war period to compensate for the loss of political influence of the monarchists and to revive the social and political engagement of the great aristocratic families. He became a leading figure in French agriculture, and in 1927 was elected first president of the Chambre d’Agriculture du Finistère. He helped found the Union nationale des syndicats agricoles (UNSE). Pierre Caziot appointed the Commission d'Organization Corporative (COC) on 21 January 1941 as an agency to construct the Peasant Corporation. The commission was headed by Hervé de Guébriant, and was mostly made up of leading conservative landowners. It took nearly two years to develop the legislation that became effective on 16 December 1942.

In 1941, Budes de Guébriant was made a member of the National Council of Vichy France. He was imprisoned in November 1944 for collaboration with the Germans. He was released in August 1945 for lack of sufficient evidence. He died in Saint-Pol-de-Léon on 30 June 1972 at the age of 91.

== Publications ==
- Deux conférences sur l'évolution agricole en Bretagne sous l'égide du Bleun-brug. 1953.

== Sources ==
- Bensoussan, David (January 2016), "HERVÉ BUDES DE GUÉBRIANT (1880-1972)", Bretania.fr (in French), Le Conseil régional de Bretagne est le propriétaire
- Jean ALLARD DE GRANDMAISON (in French), Assemblée nationale
- Lackerstein, Dr Debbie (2013-07-28), National Regeneration in Vichy France: Ideas and Policies, 1930–1944, Ashgate Publishing, Ltd., ISBN 978-1-4094-8297-0
- Moulin, Annie (1991-10-24), Peasantry and Society in France Since 1789, Cambridge University Press, ISBN 978-0-521-39577-9
- Paxton, Robert O. (1997-09-26), French Peasant Fascism : Henry Dorgeres' Greenshirts and the Crises of French Agriculture, 1929-1939: Henry Dorgeres' Greenshirts and the Crises of French Agriculture, 1929-1939, Oxford University Press, USA, ISBN 978-0-19-535474-4
