= Confédération Nationale de la Mutualité, de la Coopération et du Crédit Agricoles =

The Confédération nationale de la mutualité, de la coopération et du crédit agricole (CNMCCA) (English: The National Confederation of Reciprocity, Co-operation and Agricultural Credit) gathers the various components of the French agricultural mutualist and co-operative movement:

- The Fédération nationale de la mutualité agricole (FNMA) (The National Federation of Agricultural Reciprocity);
- The Confédération française de la coopération agricole (CFCA) (The French Confederation of the Agricultural Co-operation) which has become Coop de France;
- The Fédération nationale du crédit agricole (FNCA) (The National Federation of Agricultural Credit).

It is member of the CIF (the Conseil de l'agriculture française, or Council of French Agriculture).

== Role and function of the CNMCCA ==
The CNMCCA represents the French mutualist and co-operative agricultural movement sectors to:

1. The French authorities and other agricultural professional organizations;
2. European and international authorities: it sits at the Comité des organisations professionnelles agricoles (COPA);
3. Of the whole of the movement mutualist and co-operative French within the framework of the Groupement national de la coopération (GNC) and the ICA at the international level.

Its current President is Jean-Marie Sander; its Director General is Roland Combier.

Although mostly now focusing on the provision of services, it was historically a representative of the Radical tradition within the countryside against the larger and more conservative Union nationale des syndicats agricoles. that would later form the main current of the main French farming union, the Fédération nationale des syndicats d'exploitants agricoles.

== See also ==
- Jeunes Agriculteurs (Young Farmers Movement)
- Confédération Générale de l'Agriculture (General Confederation of Agriculture)
- Conseil de l'Agriculture Française (The Council of French Agriculture)
