= Isidore Renouard =

Member of the National Assembly for Ille-et-Vilaine's 4th constituency
- Incumbent
- Assumed office 1958

General Councillor of the Canton of Redon

Mayor of Langon

Personal details
- Died: 18 April 1975
- Cause of death: Car crash
- Party: Independent Republicans

Isidore Renouard was a French politician and representative of the Ille-et-Vilaine's 4th constituency.

Before this he was the general councillor for the canton of Redon and mayor of the small town of Langon. When he first stood in 1958 he was facing a Poujadist politician, Henri Dorgères, who had a far right past.

Renouard, a centre-right politician, joined the Valéry Giscard d'Estaing-led Independent Republicans in 1962. Reelected in 1962, 1967, 1968 and 1973, he died in 1975 in a car crash.
