= Crézancy-en-Sancerre =

- Commune
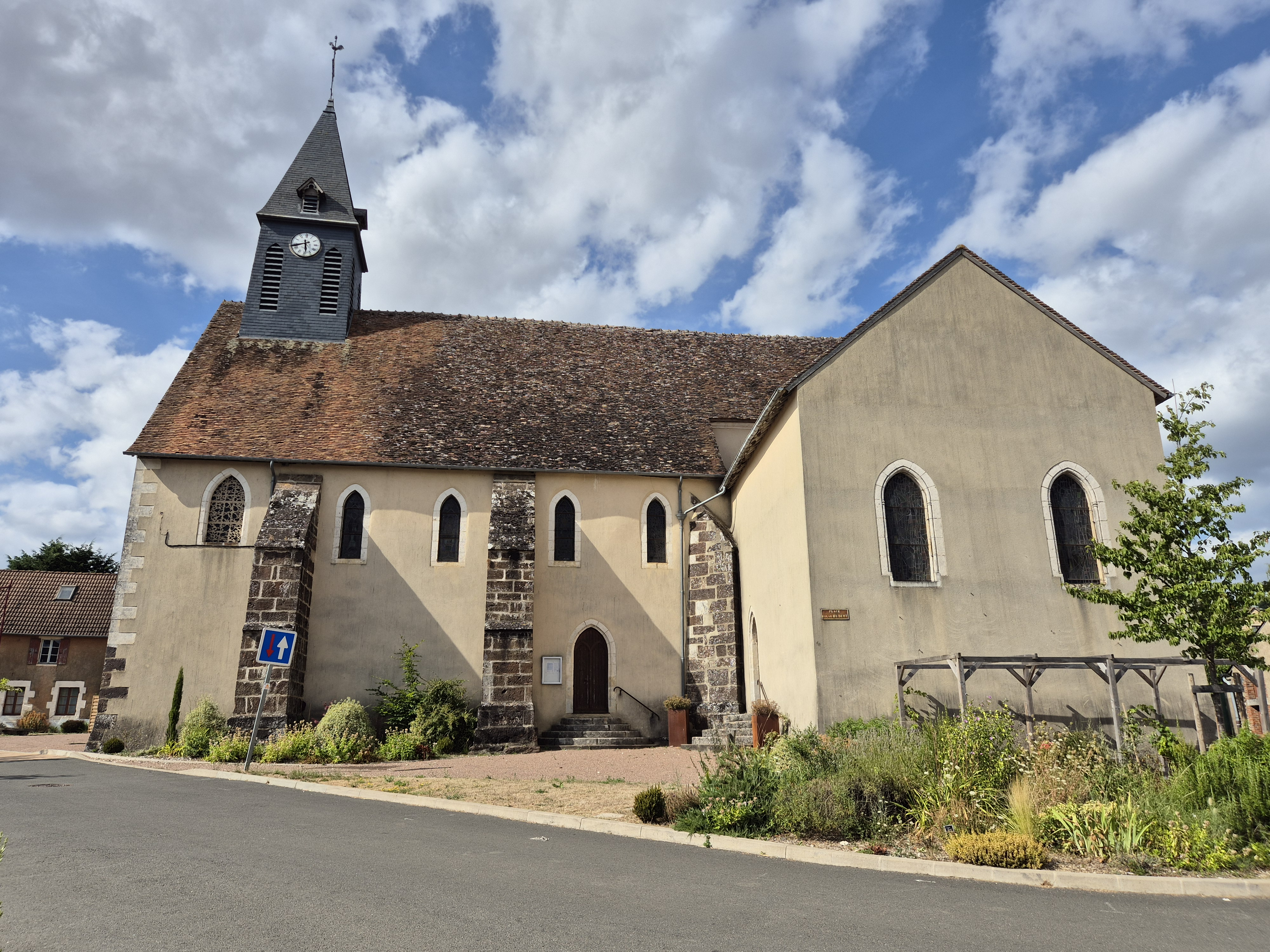
- The church

- Coat of arms
- Location of Crézancy-en-Sancerre
- Location within France Location within Centre-Val de Loire
- Coordinates: 47°18′21″N 2°44′41″E
- Country: France
- Region: Centre-Val de Loire
- Department: Cher
- Arrondissement: Bourges
- Canton: Sancerre
- Intercommunality: CC Pays Fort Sancerrois Val de Loire

Government
  - Mayor (2020–2026): Brigitte Chotard
- Area^{1}: 18.92 km^{2} (7.31 sq mi)
- Elevation: 284 m (932 ft)
- Highest elevation: 377 m (1,237 ft)
- Lowest elevation: 208 m (682 ft)
- Population (2023): 417
  - Density: 22.0/km^{2} (57.1/sq mi)
- Time zone: UTC+01:00 (CET)
  - Summer (DST): UTC+02:00 (CEST)
- INSEE/Postal code: 18079 /18300
- ^{1} French Land Register data, which excludes lakes, ponds, glaciers > 1 km^{2} (0.386 sq mi or 247 acres) and river estuaries.

Crézancy-en-Sancerre (French pronunciation: [kʁezɑ̃si ɑ̃ sɑ̃sɛʁ]) is a commune in the Cher department in the Centre-Val de Loire region of France.

== Geography ==
A farming and winegrowing village situated some 22 miles (35 km) northeast of Bourges at the junction of the D22 with the D86 roads. The commune is one of only a few that grow grapes for Sancerre AOC wines.

== Population ==
Historical population
Year	Pop.	±% p.a.
1968	562	—
1975	540	−0.57%
1982	511	−0.79%
1990	510	−0.02%
1999	500	−0.22%
2007	507	+0.17%
2012	476	−1.25%
2017	486	+0.42%
2023	417	−2.52%
Source: INSEE

== Sights ==
- The church of St. Pierre, dating from the twelfth century.
- The feudal motte in Chaume woods.
- Medieval manorhouses at Reugny, Champtin and Vauvredon.
- A windmill.

== See also ==
- Communes of the Cher department
