= Syndicat agricole =

A syndicat agricole is a French speaking farmers' union.

== In France ==
The syndicats first formed after the Waldeck Rousseau law of 1884 legalised French unions. At the same time Catholic social teaching was evolving and encouraging the self help that the syndicats were capable of. They were often affiliated to and often led by the local aristocracy, called the syndicalisme des ducs.

Many of these syndicats loosely belonged to the Union centrale des syndicats agricoles which in the 1930s was transformed into the more centralised and politically assertive Union nationale des syndicats agricoles. The corporatism espoused by this group, and its allies in the Front paysan found an echo in the Peasant Corporation of the Vichy regime. This was the forerunner of the Fédération nationale des syndicats d'exploitants agricoles which represents 20,000 syndicats.

The Radicals also had a federation, the Confédération Nationale de la Mutualité, de la Coopération et du Crédit Agricoles.

The French communist party also attempted to mirror some of these techniques to organise small farmers with less success, but this did culminate in setting up a front group, the Confédération générale des paysans travailleurs which was affiliated to the Red Peasant International. Later the left set up MODEF, the Mouvement de défense des exploitants familiaux.

== Other Countries ==
The Syndicat agricole africain (SAA, in English the African Agricultural Union) was an syndicat agricole based in the Côte d'Ivoire that focused on African farmers in the country that quickly evolved into the political movement that led the country to independence.

== See also ==
- Chamber of Agriculture in France
