= Louis Salleron =

French writer (1905–1992)

- Born: 15 August 1905; Sèvres, Hauts-de-Seine, France
- Died: 20 January 1992 (aged 86); Versailles, Yvelines, France
- Occupations: Writer, journalist

Louis Salleron (15 August 1905 – 20 January 1992) was a French author, journalist and Catholic theoretician. He was right-wing, with monarchist sympathies, and an advocate of agricultural corporatism. During the early years of the Vichy Regime in World War II (1939–45) he played a leading role in establishing the Peasant Corporation. He continued to publish books and articles after the war, and was an outspoken opponent of the Vatican II reforms to the Catholic church.

== Life ==
=== Early years (1905–39) ===
Louis Salleron was born on 15 August 1905. He was the brother of the journalist and writer Paul Sérant (Paul Salleron). He was close to the Henri, Count of Paris. From the mid-1930s he was a theoretician of agricultural corporatism, looking for a "third way" between Liberalism and Socialism. He was active in the National Union of Agricultural Unions (UNSA), and from 1935 worked with the L'Institut d'études corporatives et sociales (IECS). His thesis in law, sustained in 1937, was entitled L'évolution de l'agriculture française, du régime foncier au régime corporatif. He was a professor of political economics at the Catholic Institute of Paris from 1937 to 1957. At the Peasant Congress at Caen on 5–7 May 1937 Jacques Le Roy Ladurie, influenced by Rémy Goussault and Louis Salleron, invited the leading conservative agrarians to declare their support for corporatism. The weekly Syndicats paysans, co-edited by Salleron and Le Roy Ladurie, first appeared on 1 July 1937.

=== World War II (1939–45) ===
Under the Vichy government Salleron played a leading role in introducing the Peasant Corporation. As the semi-official theoretician of the UNSA he was the main author of the draft law of September 1940 on the Corporation Paysanne, which would create a corporative structure in agriculture. After many revision and some opposition from the Germans, the Peasant Charter was promulgated on 2 December 1940. Salleron was made the corporation's delegate-general for economic and social questions. Salleron, speaking out against the "liberalo-Marxist error", advocated "the wholesale reservation of the present structure of the peasantry, which demographically, economically, socially and morally amounts to near-perfection." The corporation struggled to become effective, handicapped by a temporary structure, internal conflicts, and actions by the Ministry of Agriculture that reduced its authority and introduced reforms without consultation. By the end of the first year Salleron gave vent to his frustration,

The struggle is ... open between the old cadres and the new principles. The truth forces us to say that the first year's experience of the Peasant Corporation marks a clear-cut success for statism. The Corporation is practically without financial resources, and, in its every move, it is kept on leading strings by the administration. This grave fact must be brought to the attention of the peasant world. If, in fact, the Corporation does not become the peasants' instrument of liberation, it will be the most perfect instrument of oppression one can imagine.

In response, Salleron was dismissed from his position in the Corporation in late 1941, and the weekly Syndicats paysans was closed soon after. Towards the end of the war, Salleron was starting to take a more realistic view of the necessary reforms. In 1944, he created draft proposals for agricultural planning in the postwar period, for large-scale technical assistance to reduce costs, and for farm equipment cooperatives.

=== Later life and death (1945–92) ===
After the war, Salleron continued to publish in monarchist or Catholic journals such as Fédération, La France catholique and La Nation française.

He led conferences on corporatist thought at the Centre d'études politiques et civiques (CEPEC), which was founded in 1954.

In 1956, Salleron and Jean Madiran founded the journal Itinéraires, which later became a leading organ for criticism of the reforms within the Catholic Church after the Second Vatican Council of 1962–65.

Louis Salleron died on 20 January 1992.

== Works ==
Louis Salleron wrote more than fifty works on Liberalism and the Catholic faith. He contributed to many reviews. In 1942, the Académie française awarded the Academy Prize of 5,000 francs for his La Terre et le Travail. In 1952, the Académie française awarded him the Prix J.-J. Weiss of 2,000 francs for Les Catholiques et le Capitalisme. Publications include:

- Louis Salleron (1937), Un régime corporatif pour l'agriculture (in French), Dunod
- Louis Salleron (1941), La terre et le travail (in French), Librairie Plon
- Louis Salleron (1942), Naissance de l'état corporatif: dix ans de syndicalisme paysan (in French), Bernard Grasset
- Louis Salleron (1944), Réflexions sur le régime à naître (in French), Desclée de Brouwer
- Louis Salleron (1947), Six études sur la propriété collective (in French), Le Portulan
- Louis Salleron (1949), L'économie libérale, Les Grandes études politiques et sociales (in French), A. Fayard
- Louis Salleron (1949), Un jeune catholique devient communiste, malgré les cordiaux avertissements de Louis Salleron (in French), La Jeune Parque
- Louis Salleron (1951), Les Catholiques et le capitalisme (in French), La Palatine
- Louis Salleron (1957), L'Automation, Que sais-je? (in French), PUF
- Louis Salleron (1960), Autorité et commandement dans l'entreprise, Méthodes et philosophie de l'organisation (in French), vol. 5, Éditions de l'Entreprise Moderne
- Louis Salleron (1963), La France est-elle gouvernable? Propos politiques et civiques (in French), recueil de ses conférences au CEPEC, L'Esprit nouveau
- Louis Salleron (1964), Dieu sans Dieu ( honest to God ) (in French), Translation and preface by L. Salleron, NEL
- Louis Salleron (1966), L'organisation du pouvoir dans l'entreprise: participation, démocratie (in French), Entreprise moderne d'édition
- Louis Salleron (1970), La nouvelle messe, Itinéraires (in French), Paris: Nouvelles éditions latines, p. 188
- Louis Salleron (1972), Essai sur le principe de population [de] Malthus: analyse critique, Profil d'une œuvre (in French), vol. 204, Hatier
- Louis Salleron (1977), Libéralisme et socialisme du XVIIIe siècle à nos jours (in French), Club du livre civique
- Louis Salleron (1977), Ce qu'est le mystère à l'intelligence: propos sur la foi (in French), Articles from Itinéraires and La Pensée catholique, Ed. du Cèdre
- Louis Salleron (1983), Dix dialogues sur la crise de l'Eglise (in French), D.M. Morin
- Louis Salleron (1983), Le Cancer socialiste (in French), D.M. Morin

== Sources ==
- Guillaume Gros (2011), "Le corporatisme de Louis Salleron. Olivier Dard", Convergences (in French), Metz: Peter Lang
- Louis SALLERON (in French), Académie française
- "Louis Salleron", Babelio (in French)
- "Louis Salleron", BnF (in French)
- "Louis Salleron (décédé le 20 janvier 1992)", Itinéraires (2ème série) (in French), vol. IX, Spring 1992
- Ousset, Jean (2002-07-01), Action, IHS Press, ISBN 978-1-932528-94-7
- Paxton, Robert O. (1997-09-26), French Peasant Fascism : Henry Dorgeres' Greenshirts and the Crises of French Agriculture, 1929-1939, Oxford University Press, USA, ISBN 978-0-19-535474-4
- Wright, Gordon (1964), Rural Revolution in France: The Peasantry in the Twentieth Century, Stanford University Press, ISBN 978-0-8047-0190-7
