= National Council (Vichy Government) =

National Council Conseil national

History
- Founded: 22 January 1941
- Disbanded: 30 November 1943

Constitution
- Vichy France

The National Council was a consultative assembly created on 22 January 1941 by the Vichy regime during World War II under the direction of Pierre-Étienne Flandin. It aimed to replace representative democracy with a structure intended to provide policy advice to the regime. The Council ceased operations in November 1943.

== History ==
=== Background and creation ===
Under the National Revolution, the Vichy regime abolished parliamentary democracy, prompting the establishment of the National Council as a new advisory body. Announced in January 1941, the Council sought to serve as a forum for discussions and recommendations on administrative and constitutional reforms in a context of national reconstruction. Unlike many other Vichy institutions it represented both the Vichy zone and the occupied zone.

=== Operations ===
The council was a purely advisory body with no legislative powers, which had been kept with Petain. It convened commissions on specific topics, such as administrative reorganization, economic reform, and constitutional development. Sessions were held from May 1941 to early 1942 at the Villa Strauss in Vichy.

== Composition ==
=== Structure ===
The National Council comprised 213 members appointed directly by the Head of State. These included former parliamentarians, union representatives, professional leaders, and prominent figures from the social, cultural, and economic elites.

=== Represented groups ===
- Former parliamentarians: Senators and deputies from the Third French Republic.
- Trade unionists: Representatives of the CGT, French Confederation of Christian Workers, and other unions.
- Economic and cultural elites: Business leaders, academics, scientists, lawyers, and artists.

== Legacy ==
The National Council symbolized the Vichy regime's attempts to legitimize its governance while rejecting democratic institutions. Critics have characterized it as a tool of authoritarian consolidation. It was officially dissolved in November 1943 as part of broader institutional changes.
