= Marius Vazeilles =

French archaeologist

Marius Vazeilles (1881–1973) was a French archaeologist. He was also a militant of the French Communist Party who in the 1920s attempted to organise small farmers into the communist led union the Confédération générale des paysans travailleurs which was allied to the Red Peasant International.
