= Henri Dorgères =

French politician (1897–1985)

Henri Dorgère
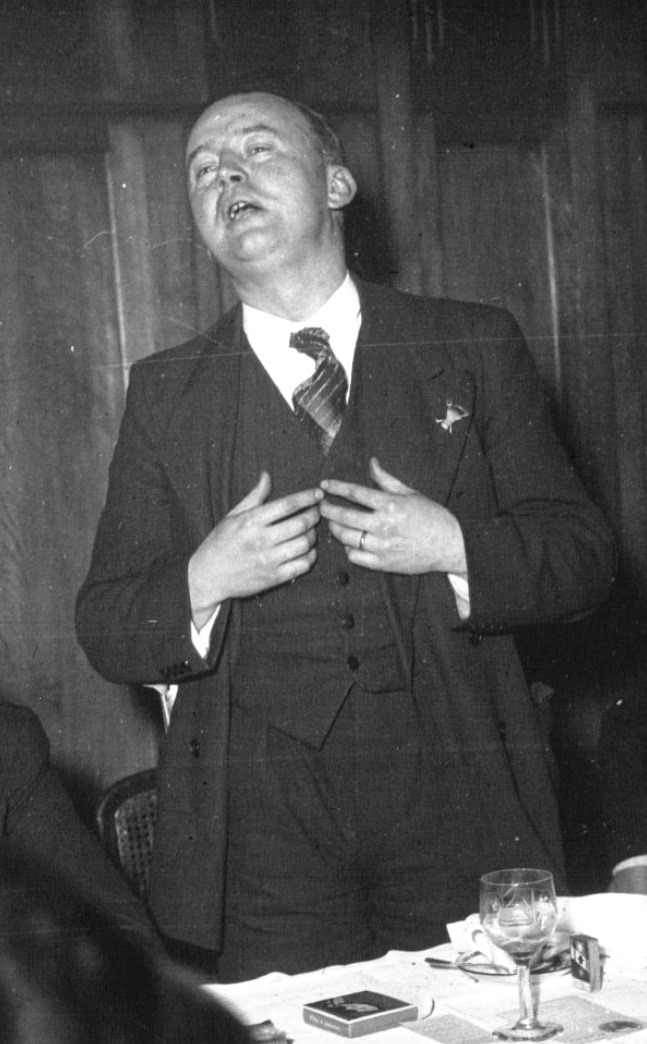
- Portrait of Dorgères, 1937. From the BnF Gallica archives
- Born: Henri-Auguste d'Halluin; 6 February 1897; Wasquehal, Nord-Pas-de-Calais, French Third Republic
- Died: 22 January 1985 (aged 87); Yerres, Île-de-France, French Fifth Republic
- Occupation: Journalist
- Era: 20th century
- Organizations: La Presse régionale; Camelots du Roi
- Notable work: Au XXe siècle: 10 ans de jacquerie
- Political party: UDCA
- Other political affiliations: Comités de défense paysanne; Front paysan
- Movement: Fascism and Poujadism
- Board member of: Peasant Corporation; National Council
- Criminal charges: Collaboration
- Criminal penalty: Imprisonment
- Spouse: Cécile Cartigny (m. 1921)

Député of the National Assembly
- In office 1956–1958
- President: René Coty
- Succeeded by: Isidore Renouard
- Parliamentary group: UFF
- Constituency: Ille-et-Vilaine

Henri Dorgères was the pseudonym of the French political activist Henri-Auguste d'Halluin (February 6, 1897, Wasquehal – January 22, 1985). He is best known for the Comités de Défense Paysanne which he set up in the interwar period.

== Biography ==
Dorgères was born in 1897, in Wasquehal, a small town in north of France. He was interred by the Germans during the First World War. After passing his baccalaureate he studied law for two years. As a student he was an active royalist. While working in public relations in Wasquehal, he married Cécile Cartigny in Lille on April 23, 1921.

In 1921, he moved to Rennes, in Brittany, to work as a journalist. In 1925 he became an editor of the regional Catholic daily Le Nouvelliste de Bretagne and in 1928 became the editor in chief of the farming journal Progrès agricole de l'Ouest. During that time it was claimed that he became a member of the Camelots du Roi of Action Française. It was as a journalist in Rennes in 1929 that he founded his first Peasants' Defense Committee. These committees had action squads known as Greenshirts, which became a general name for the organisation.

In 1934 he claimed that a system like Italian fascism would resolve a lot of problems in French agriculture. There is an ongoing historical debate as to whether, or how far, Dorgeres could be seen as fascist.

On March 31, 1935 he stood unsuccessfully in a by-election for the Blois constituency as a candidate for the Front paysan where he was narrowly defeated in the second round of voting by the Radical-Socialist candidate Émile Laurens. in a constituency vacated by the former and future Prime Minister Camille Chautemps for a Senate seat.

During this time he wrote the book Haut les fourches (transl. Raise the Pitchforks), laying out an anti-Republican and anti-Parliamentary back to the land program.

During the Vichy regime, Dorgères became one of nine directors of the Peasant Corporation, the Vichy body that was designed to put into practice the corporatist ideas of interwar agrarian activsts. He was also a member of the Vichy National Council and awarded the Ordre de la Francisque by Marshal Philippe Pétain for his work in the French right-wing.

Because of his work with the Vichy regime, Dorgères was imprisoned by the Allies during the liberation of France in 1944. He was released because of work he had done with the Resistance during the war. In 1956 he was elected for the Poujadist Union for the Defense of Tradesmen and Artisans to the French National Assembly from the Breton Département of Ille-et-Vilaine; he remained in the Assembly until 1958 when he lost the newly created Ille-et-Vilaine's 4th constituency to Isidore Renouard.

In 1959 he published his memoir Au XXe siècle : 10 ans de jacquerie.

== Sources ==
- d'Appollonia, Ariane Chebel (1998), L'extrême-droite en France: De Maurras à Le Pen (in French), Editions Complexe, ISBN 978-2-87027-764-5
- Bernet, J (1979), "Un Compiégnois célèbre dans l'entre-deux-guerres : Fleurant Agricola, fondateur du Parti Agraire", Annales historiques compiégnoises modernes et contemporaines, No. 6 1979 (in French)
- Cordellier, Serge (2015), Organisations professionnelles agricoles: histoire et pouvoirs (in French), Cairn.info
- Dorgères, Henri (1959), Au XXe siècle : 10 ans de jacquerie (PDF) (in French), FeniXX réédition numérique, ISBN 978-2-307-06264-6
- Hubscher, Ronald (1982), "Le Progrès Agricole; l'activisme au service de la France profonde (1887-1970)", Revue du Nord (in French) (252)
- Irvine, William D. (1999), Forum on Robert O. Paxton, French Peasant Fascism
- Ory, Pascal (1975), "Le dorgérisme, institution et discours d'une colère paysanne (1929–1939)", Revue d'Histoire Moderne et Contemporaine (in French), 22 (2): 168–190, doi:10.3406/rhmc.1975.2416
- Paxton, Robert O. (1997-09-26), French Peasant Fascism : Henry Dorgeres' Greenshirts and the Crises of French Agriculture, 1929-1939, Oxford University Press, USA, ISBN 978-0-19-535474-4
