= Union centrale des syndicats agricoles =

The Union centrale des syndicats agricoles was the French national body representing or farmers' unions. They were replaced by the Union nationale des syndicats agricoles.

== Sources ==
- Barral, Pierre (2008), "Un normand de fort caractère : Jacques Le Roy Ladurie: Xavier Walter, Paysan militant. Jacques Le Roy Ladurie 1925-1940", Annales de Normandie (in French), 58 (1–2)
