= Fédération nationale des syndicats d'exploitants agricoles =

French agricultural trade union federation

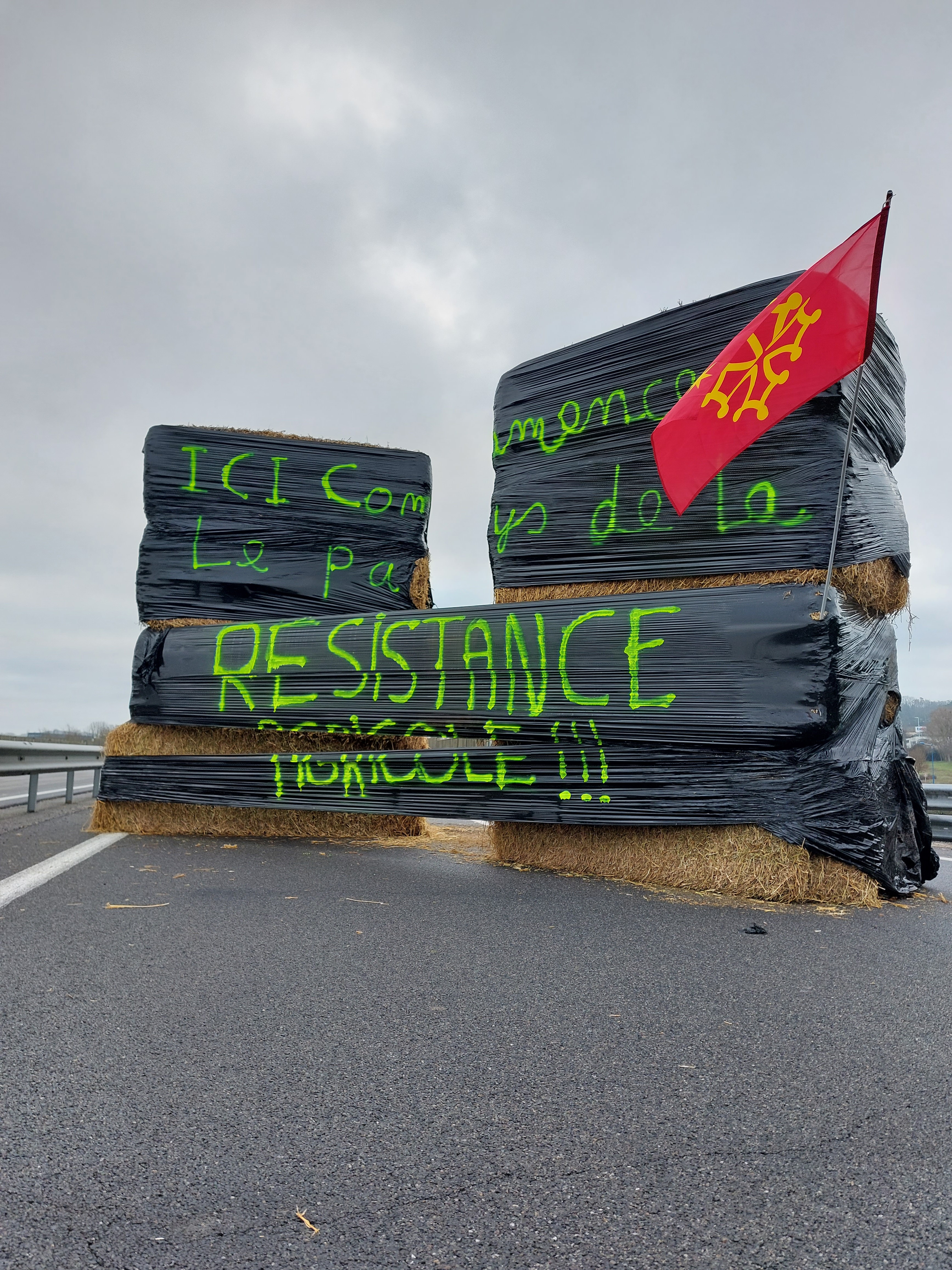
Improvised road blockade in January 2024 by the FNSEA in Occitania at L'Isle-Jourdain

The Fédération nationale des syndicats d'exploitants agricoles (FNSEA; transl. National Federation of Agricultural Holders' Unions) is a French umbrella organisation charged with the national representation of 20,000 local syndicat agricoles (agricultural unions)) and 22 regional federations.

== Establishment ==
The Vichy regime's Peasant Corporation was dissolved after the Liberation of France in September 1944, but the unity of agricultural organisations that it had established persisted.

The new Socialist Minister of Agriculture, François Tanguy-Prigent, replaced it with a national union of working farmers rather than landowners, the Confédération générale de l'agriculture (GCA).

In March 1946, the Fédération nationale des syndicats d'exploitants agricoles was created as a CGA branch, but it soon dominated the confederation. Many of the former Peasant Corporation leaders became leaders of the FNSEA.

== See also ==
- Chamber of Agriculture in France

== Sources ==
- Cordellier, Serge (2015), Organisations professionnelles agricoles : histoire et pouvoirs, Cairn.info
- Paxton, Robert O. (1997-09-26), French Peasant Fascism : Henry Dorgeres' Greenshirts and the Crises of French Agriculture, 1929-1939: Henry Dorgeres' Greenshirts and the Crises of French Agriculture, 1929-1939, Oxford University Press, USA, ISBN 978-0-19-535474-4
