= Environmental law =

Branch of law concerning the natural environment

Environmental laws are laws that protect the environment. The term "environmental law" encompasses treaties, statutes, regulations, conventions, and policies designed to protect the natural environment and manage the impact of human activities on ecosystems and natural resources, such as forests, minerals, or fisheries. It addresses issues such as pollution control, resource conservation, biodiversity protection, climate change mitigation, and sustainable development. As part of both national and international legal frameworks, environmental law seeks to balance environmental preservation with economic and social needs, often through regulatory mechanisms, enforcement measures, and incentives for compliance.

The field emerged prominently in the mid-20th century as industrialization and environmental degradation spurred global awareness, culminating in landmark agreements like the 1972 Stockholm Conference and the 1992 Rio Declaration. Key principles include the precautionary principle, the polluter pays principle, and intergenerational equity. Modern environmental law intersects with human rights, international trade, and energy policy.

Internationally, treaties such as the Paris Agreement (2015), the Kyoto Protocol (1997), and the Convention on Biological Diversity (1992) establish cooperative frameworks for addressing transboundary issues. Nationally, laws like the UK's Clean Air Act 1956 and the US Toxic Substances Control Act of 1976 establish regulations to limit pollution and manage chemical safety. Enforcement varies by jurisdiction, often involving governmental agencies, judicial systems, and international organizations. Environmental impact assessments are a common way to enforce environmental law.

Challenges in environmental law include reconciling economic growth with sustainability, determining adequate levels of compensation, and addressing enforcement gaps in international contexts. The field continues to evolve in response to emerging crises such as biodiversity loss, plastic pollution in oceans, and climate change.

== History ==
Examples of laws designed to preserve the environment for its own sake or for human enjoyment are found throughout history. In the common law, the primary protection was found in the law of nuisance, but this only allowed for private actions for damages or injunctions if there was harm to land. Thus, smells emanating from pigsties, strict liability against dumping rubbish, or damage from exploding dams. Private enforcement, however, was limited and found to be woefully inadequate to deal with major environmental threats, particularly threats to common resources. During the "Great Stink" of 1858, the dumping of sewerage into the River Thames began to smell so ghastly in the summer heat that Parliament had to be evacuated. Ironically, the Metropolitan Commission of Sewers Act 1848 had allowed the Metropolitan Commission for Sewers to close cesspits around the city in an attempt to "clean up" but this simply led people to pollute the river. In 19 days, Parliament passed a further Act to build the London sewerage system. London also suffered from terrible air pollution, and this culminated in the "Great Smog" of 1952, which in turn triggered its own legislative response: the Clean Air Act 1956. The basic regulatory structure was to set limits on emissions for households and businesses (particularly burning of coal) while an inspectorate would enforce compliance.

== Pollution control ==
=== Air quality ===
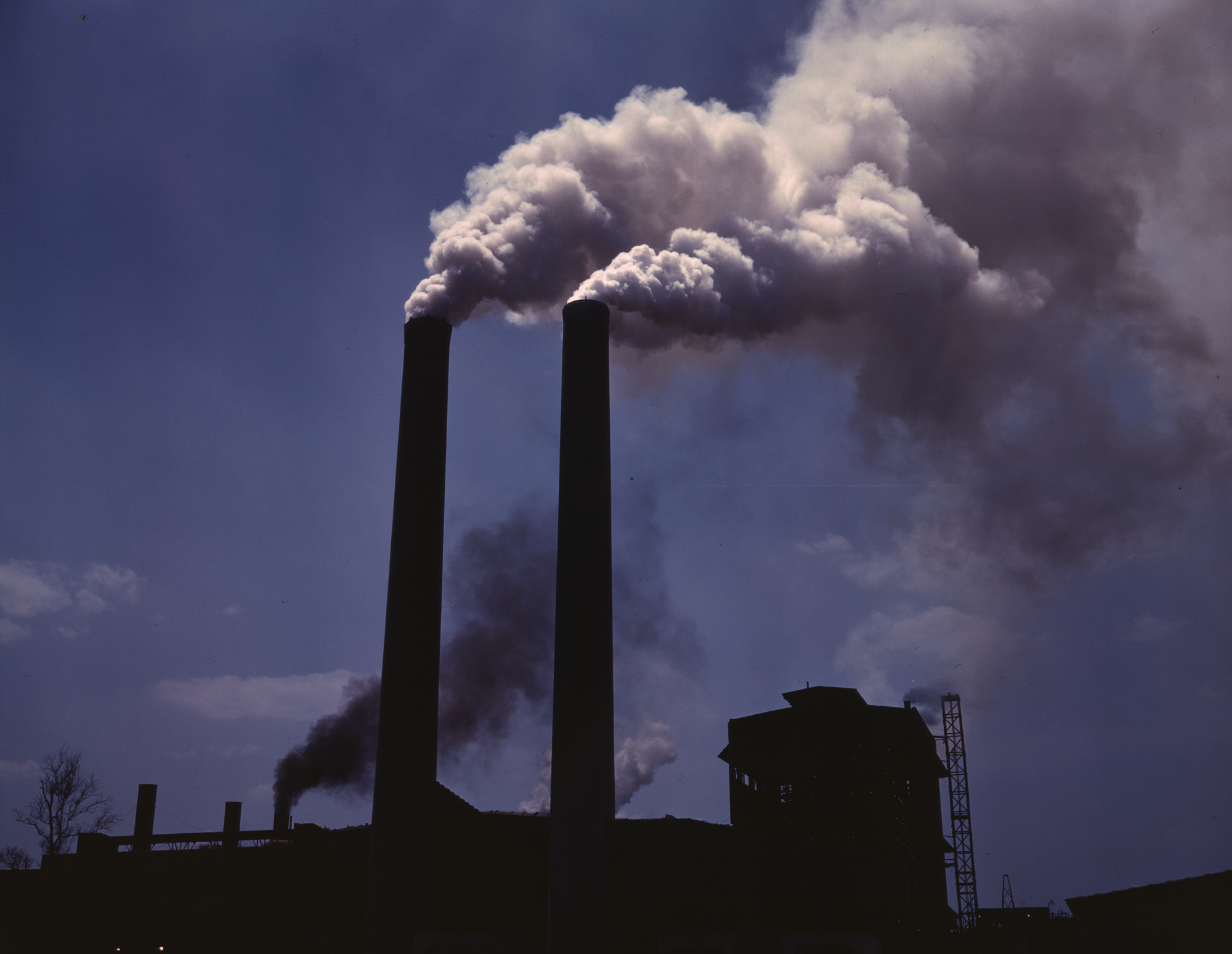
Industrial air pollution now regulated by air quality law

Air quality laws govern the emission of air pollutants into the atmosphere. A specialized subset of air quality laws regulate the quality of air inside buildings. Air quality laws are often designed specifically to protect human health by limiting or eliminating airborne pollutant concentrations. Other initiatives are designed to address broader ecological problems, such as limitations on chemicals that affect the ozone layer, and emissions trading programs to address acid rain or climate change. Regulatory efforts include identifying and categorising air pollutants, setting limits on acceptable emissions levels, and dictating necessary or appropriate mitigation technologies.

Air quality index (AQI) is used to identify contaminants present in the air that would result in affecting public health. They test among contaminants and high levels of the major six pollutants, including nitrogen dioxide, ozone, carbon monoxide, and sulfur dioxide. The impacts on air quality reflect on the safety behind what contaminants are safe enough to breathe in. The high levels of pollutants can vary based on seasonal changes and what is more likely to cause an issue with air quality at its peak. Exposure to dangerous pollutants can adverse health effects over time, and can be a potential threat to a decline in population over time.

=== Water quality ===
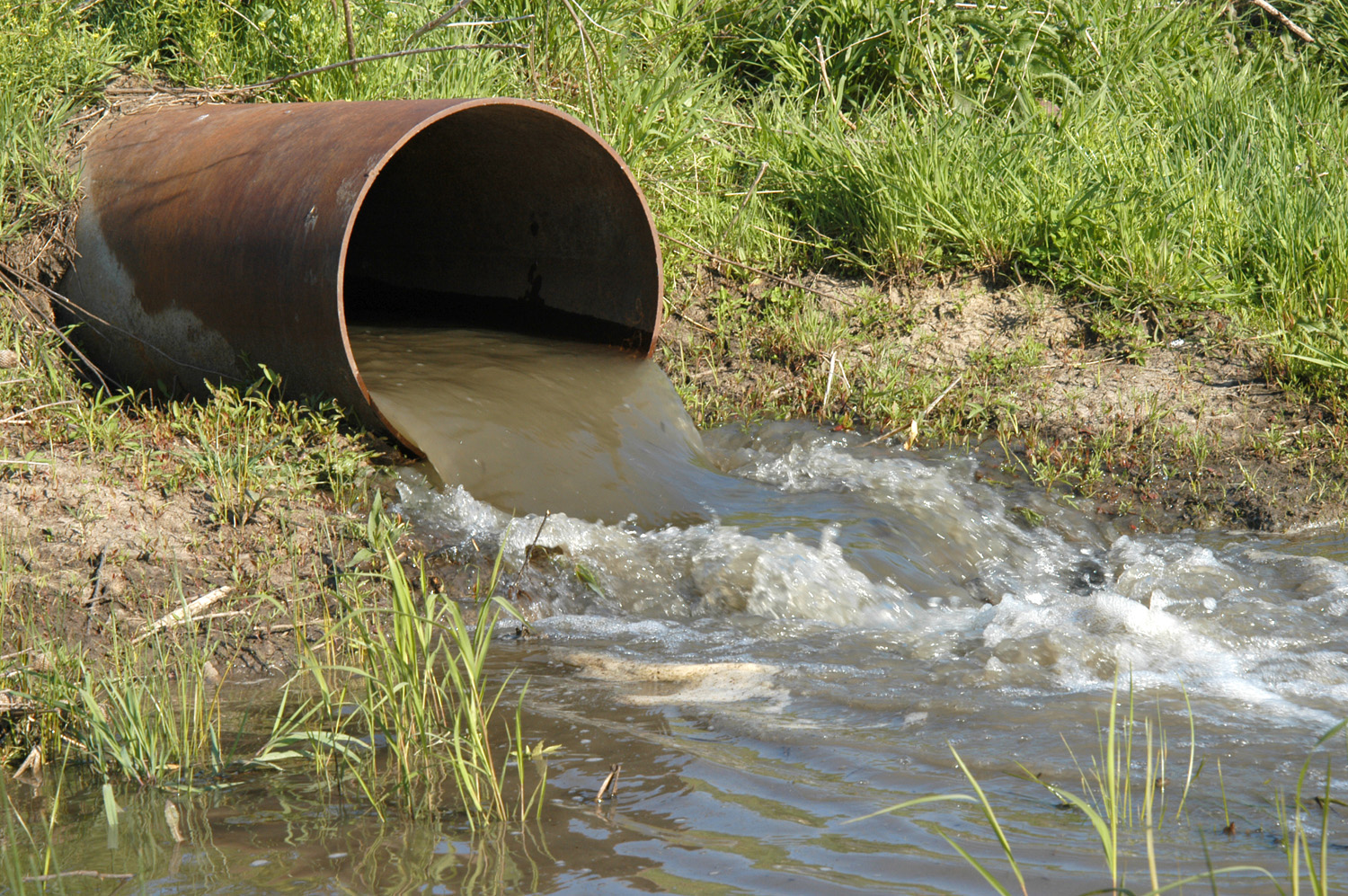
A typical stormwater outfall, subject to water quality law

Water quality laws govern the protection of water resources for human health and the environment. Water quality laws are legal standards or requirements governing water quality, that is, the concentrations of water pollutants in some regulated volume of water. Such standards are generally expressed as levels of a specific water pollutants (whether chemical, physical, biological, or radiological) that are deemed acceptable in the water volume, and are generally designed relative to the water's intended use - whether for human consumption, industrial or domestic use, recreation, or as aquatic habitat. Additionally, these laws provide regulations on the alteration of the chemical, physical, radiological, and biological characteristics of water resources. Regulatory efforts may include identifying and categorizing water pollutants, dictating acceptable pollutant concentrations in water resources, and limiting pollutant discharges from effluent sources. Regulatory areas include sewage treatment and disposal, industrial and agricultural waste water management, and control of surface runoff from construction sites and urban environments. Water quality laws provides the foundation for regulations in water standards, monitoring, required inspections and permits, and enforcement. These laws may be modified to meet current needs and priorities.

=== Waste management ===
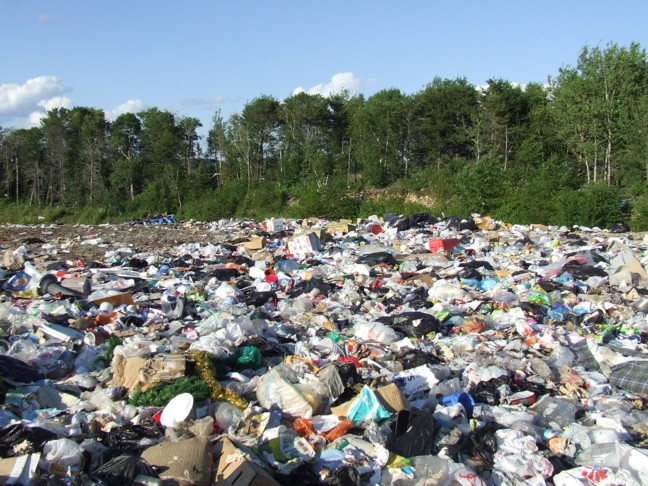
A municipal landfill, operated pursuant to waste management law

Waste management laws govern the transport, treatment, storage, and disposal of all manners of waste, including municipal solid waste, hazardous waste, and nuclear waste, among many other types. Waste laws are generally designed to minimize or eliminate the uncontrolled dispersal of waste materials into the environment. When left unregulated, these dispersals can cause ecological or biological harm. Most waste management laws are designed to reduce the generation of waste and promote or mandate waste recycling. Waste management laws also regulate organic waste disposal, including composting which is increasingly being recognized as a more sustainable alternative to landfilling and incineration. Regulatory efforts include classifying waste types, setting standards for transport, treatment, storage, and disposal, and establishing enforcement mechanisms.

Consuming less waste can heavily reduce the amount of energy used in products and help minimize consumption of goods over time. Waste separation could potentially lead to having additional resources and filter out waste during that process. Ways to reduce the amount of waste include green purchasing and reducing disposable products that contribute to climate change. Wealth has led to increase in environmental risks with waste produced including corporations, thus limiting the amount of regulation.

=== Contaminant cleanup ===
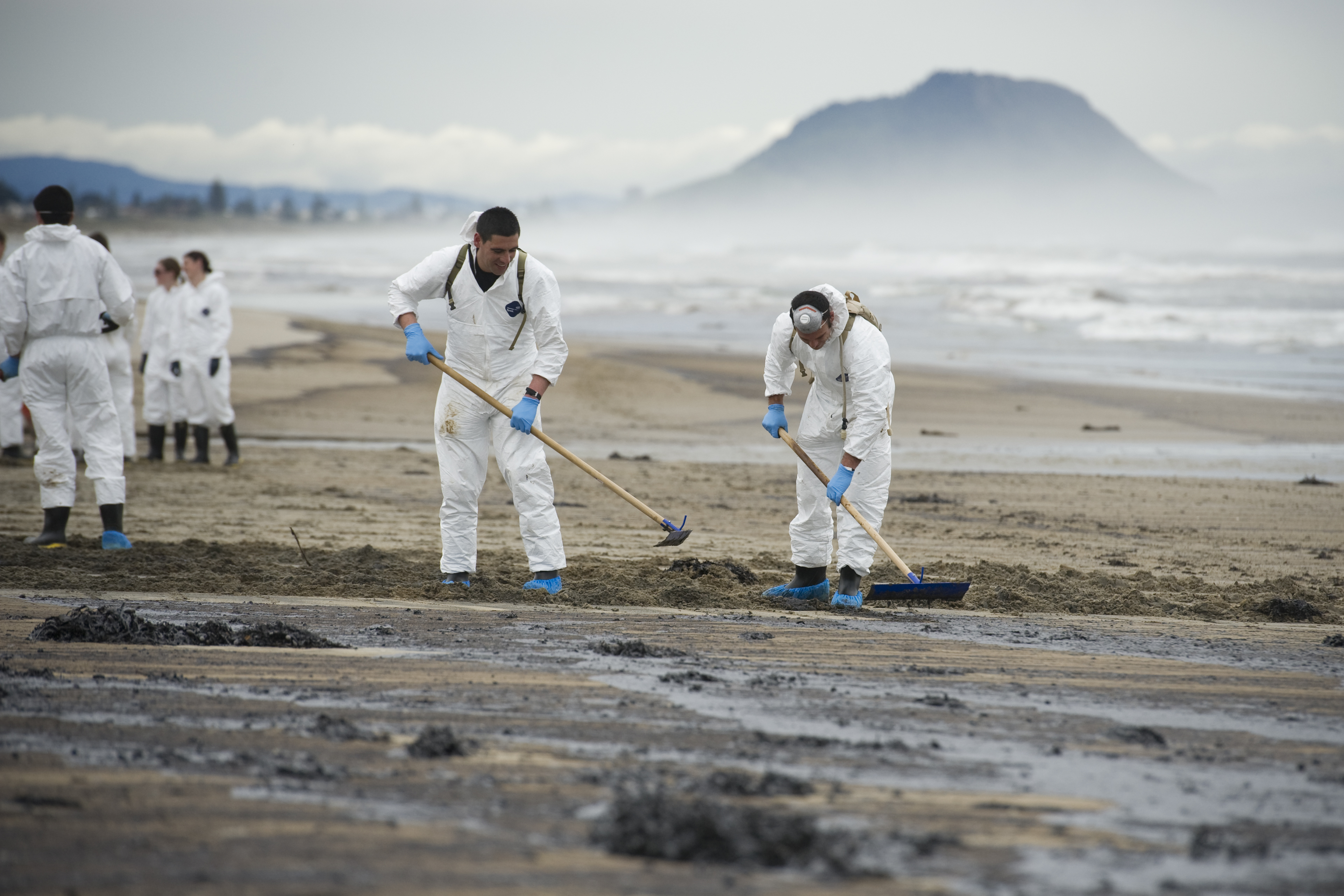
Oil spill emergency response, governed by environmental cleanup law

Environmental cleanup laws govern the removal of pollution or contaminants from environmental media such as soil, sediment, surface water, or ground water. Unlike pollution control laws, cleanup laws are designed to respond after-the-fact to environmental contamination, and consequently must often define not only the necessary response actions, but also the parties who may be responsible for undertaking (or paying for) such actions. Regulatory requirements may include rules for emergency response, liability allocation, site assessment, remedial investigation, feasibility studies, remedial action, post-remedial monitoring, and site reuse.

Sewage treatments are used for filtering out any contaminants that are present to ensure water quality remains clean and safe to consume. If left untreated for long period of time, antibiotic resistance may occur and will eventually cause health problems as the treatment plants won't get filtered easily. Government officials would need to test often to check the filtering system for efficiency. Wastewater and river ecosystems can effectively remove heavy metals such as lead and cadmium by using sea cucumbers, algae, and decayed plants to reduce the amount of heavy toxins that may be in water.

=== Chemical safety ===
Chemical safety laws govern the use of chemicals in human activities, particularly human-made chemicals in modern industrial applications. As contrasted with media-oriented environmental laws (e.g., air or water quality laws), chemical control laws seek to manage the (potential) pollutants themselves. Regulatory efforts include banning specific chemical constituents in consumer products (e.g., Bisphenol A in plastic bottles), and regulating pesticides.

Safety regulations including the Toxic Substances Control Act (TSCA) determine the chemicals that are considered harmful from the Environmental Protection Agency (EPA), but end up placing restrictions to several chemicals per year as opposed to finding many other chemicals that would be considered harmful if exposed. According to the EPA, only 200 out of the 84,000 chemicals used in 2013 were used for testing purposes, raising concerns on whether TSCA would be up to date in their database. Chemicals would need to be tested for toxicity, instability, and flammability when coming into contact with other chemicals. It is essential to identify and analyze the different types of chemicals for its potential risks or it could have dangerous outcomes.

== Resource sustainability ==
=== Impact assessment ===
Environmental impact assessment (EIA) is the assessment of the environmental consequences of a plan, policy, program, or actual projects prior to the decision to move forward with the proposed action. In this context, the term "environmental impact assessment" is usually used when applied to actual projects by individuals or companies and the term "strategic environmental assessment" (SEA) applies to policies, plans and programmes most often proposed by organs of state. It is a tool of environmental management forming a part of project approval and decision-making. Environmental assessments may be governed by rules of administrative procedure regarding public participation and documentation of decision making, and may be subject to judicial review.

=== Water resources ===
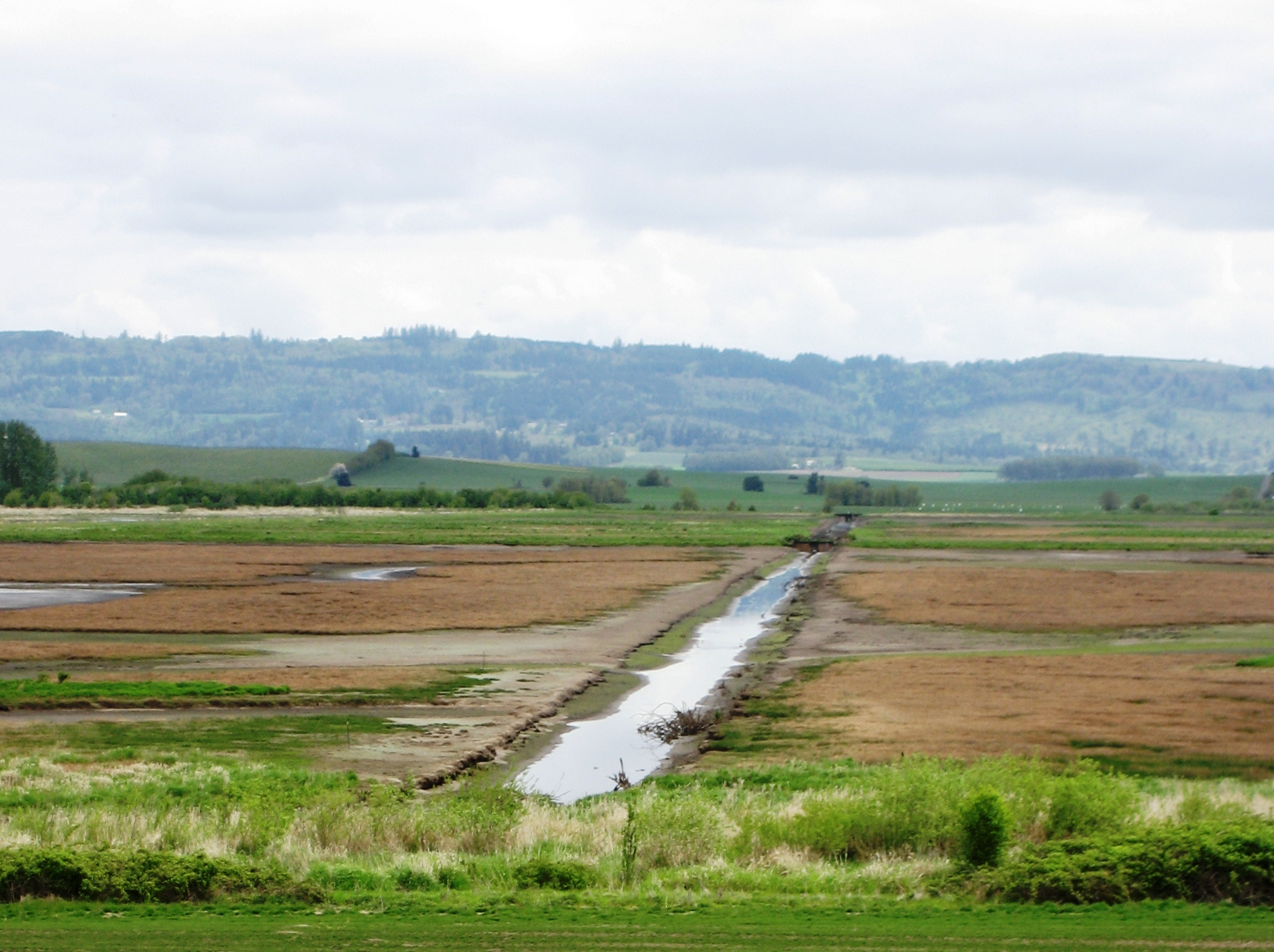
An irrigation ditch, operated in accordance with water resources law

Water resources laws govern the ownership and use of water resources, including surface water and ground water. Regulatory areas may include water conservation, use restrictions, and ownership regimes.

Such laws include the right to be provided clean water at the bare minimum, according to the United Nations Committee. Water resources should be safe, clean, accessible, and affordable for human concern. This also means having facilities that operate in combatting water pollution and provide clean sources of water for maintenance. Duty dumping may occur if one is not held responsible for fulfilling their obligations in attempt to reduce environmental impact. Financial obligations are required for reaching quality standards to avoid risk of contamination that would raise public health concerns. An economic approach is made to provide a budget for having running water regulated normally and varies among countries distribution systems in efforts to reach human standards. Involvement is crucial for helping with water safety concerns, gaining attention of communities to help support programs established to further regulate water consumption.

=== Mineral resources ===
Mining law is the branch of law relating to the legal requirements affecting minerals and mining. Mining law covers several basic topics, including the ownership of the mineral resource and who can work them. Mining is also affected by various regulations regarding the health and safety of miners, as well as the environmental impact of mining. This article covers the mining laws in select German-speaking countries, English-speaking countries, French-speaking countries, Spanish-speaking countries, and Portuguese-speaking countries.

Managing mineral resources can be challenging to maintain as supply chains have lower chances of traceability with importing goods from their designated spots for mining. Sustainability and quality processes can be done through regulatory obligations for ensuring the source of importing goods are taken responsibility. The risks that may be involved can include unsafe working conditions as mining is labor-intensive and workers' rights since environmental risks are likely to occur when mining, such as water contamination and ingesting minerals when exposed in the air. Mining conditions can vary by country as some prohibit mining if there are unsafe working conditions while some are likely to be interested as it adheres to investments for mining industries growing in the future.

=== Forest resources ===
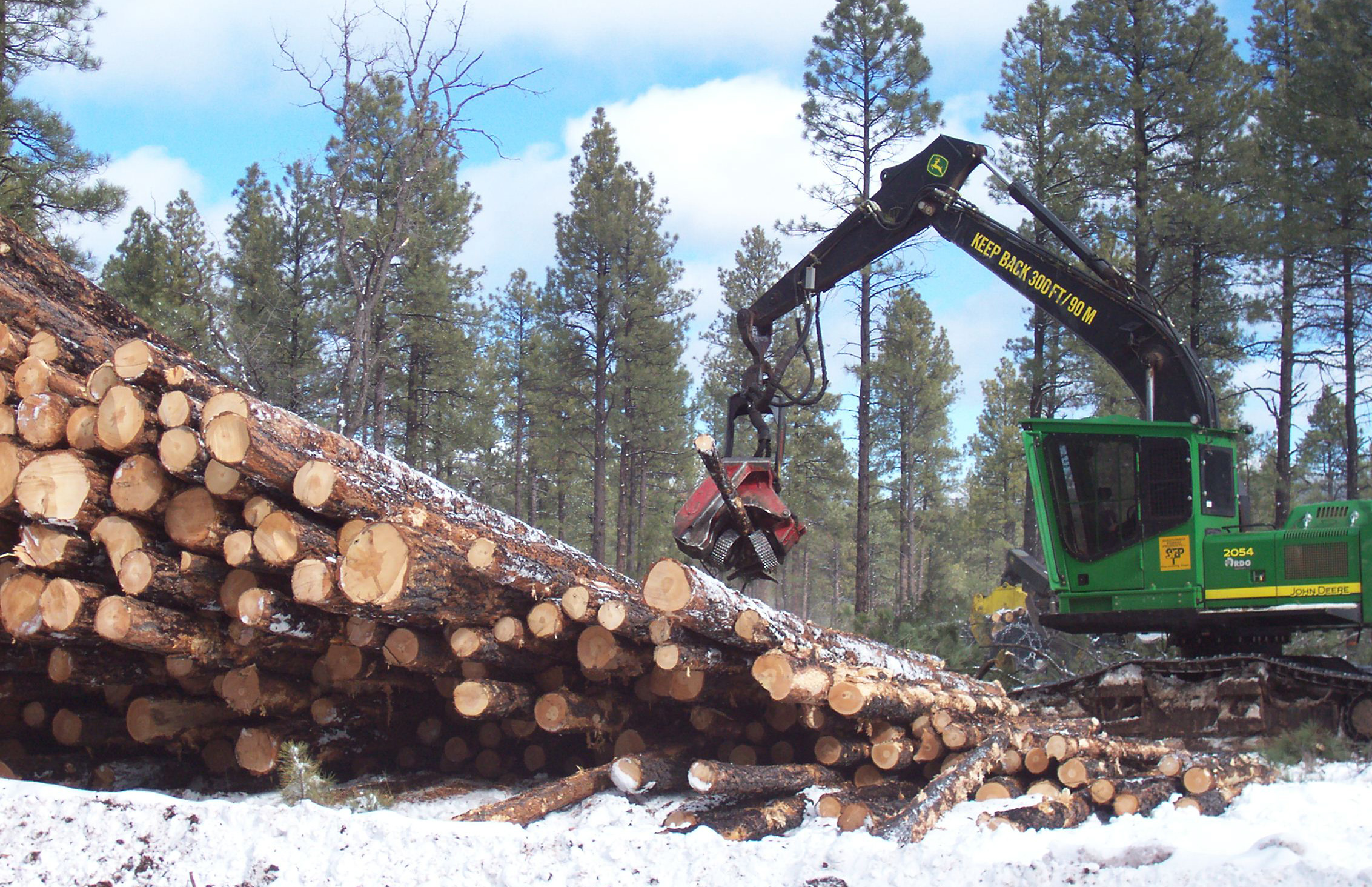
A timber operation, regulated by forestry law

Forestry laws govern activities in designated forest lands, most commonly with respect to forest management and timber harvesting. Forestry laws generally adopt management policies for public forest resources, such as multiple use and sustained yield. Forest management is split between private and public management, with public forests being sovereign property of the State. Forestry laws are now considered an international affair.

=== Wildlife and plants ===
Wildlife laws govern the potential impact of human activity on wild animals, whether directly on individuals or populations, or indirectly via habitat degradation. Similar laws may operate to protect plant species. Such laws may be enacted entirely to protect biodiversity, or as a means for protecting species deemed important for other reasons. Regulatory efforts may include the creation of special conservation statuses, prohibitions on killing, harming, or disturbing protected species, efforts to induce and support species recovery, establishment of wildlife refuges to support conservation, and prohibitions on trafficking in species or animal parts to combat poaching.

Illegal wildlife trade has become an organized crime, and has led to tracking down poachers through law enforcement and high-level security approaches. Criminal activity involving animals have undergone pressure once regulation standards are established, having activities happen in other places to avoiding law enforcement. Conservationists may argue that it is risky that poachers are likely to be armed with weapons when law hunting down animals, leaving no choice but to recruit armed rangers for stopping their crimes. Tackling illegal wildlife crime would require involvement and support from international policies and law enforcement such as INTERPOL and EUROPOL. EUROPOL had to deal with political pressure to combat environmental crime, making it a priority to focus on. Ecological changes pertaining to human activity caused a decline in wildlife population over time. Relationships between humans and species result in negative outcomes of economic development and cultural significances.

=== Fish and game ===
Fish and game laws regulate the right to pursue and take or kill certain kinds of fish and wild animal (game). Such laws may restrict the days to harvest fish or game, the number of animals caught per person, the species harvested, or the weapons or fishing gear used. Such laws may seek to balance dueling needs for preservation and harvest and to manage both environment and populations of fish and game. Game laws can provide a legal structure to collect license fees and other money which is used to fund conservation efforts as well as to obtain harvest information used in wildlife management practice.

Illegal fishing often gets unreported with little to no regulation for transporting goods in facilities. Overfishing has impacted fisheries with a decline in economic growth and destruction of ecosystems. Marine resources would cause pressure among other countries relying on fishing for providing food in communities if illegal fishing isn't managed carefully. Another issue is an increase in marine pollution that has a decline of fish population with ocean disposals of toxic waste and lack of oxygen produced, which makes harvesting fish difficult to accomplish.

== Principles ==
Environmental law has developed in response to emerging awareness of—and concern over—issues impacting the world. While laws have developed piecemeal and for a variety of reasons, some effort has gone into identifying key concepts and guiding principles common to environmental law as a whole. Some laws are seen as temporary or transitional where political realities prevent adoption of more ideal rules. Pope Francis in his 2015 encyclical letter Laudato si' acknowledged that "political realism may call for transitional measures and technologies, so long as these are accompanied by the gradual framing and acceptance of binding commitments".

The principles discussed below are not an exhaustive list and are not universally recognized or accepted. Nonetheless, they represent important principles for the understanding of environmental law around the world.

=== Sustainable development ===
Defined by the United Nations Environment Programme (UNEP) as "development that meets the needs of the present without compromising the ability of future generations to meet their own needs," sustainable development may be considered together with the concepts of "integration" (development cannot be considered in isolation from sustainability) and "interdependence" (social and economic development, and environmental protection, are interdependent). Laws mandating environmental impact assessment and requiring or encouraging development to minimize environmental impacts may be assessed against this principle.

The modern concept of sustainable development was a topic of discussion at the 1972 United Nations Conference on the Human Environment (Stockholm Conference), and the driving force behind the 1983 World Commission on Environment and Development (WCED, or Bruntland Commission). In 1992, the first UN Earth Summit resulted in the Rio Declaration, Principle 3 of which reads: "The right to development must be fulfilled so as to equitably meet developmental and environmental needs of present and future generations." Sustainable development has been a core concept of international environmental discussion ever since, including at the World Summit on Sustainable Development (Earth Summit 2002), and the United Nations Conference on Sustainable Development (Earth Summit 2012, or Rio+20).

=== Equity ===
Defined by UNEP to include intergenerational equity – "the right of future generations to enjoy a fair level of the common patrimony" – and intragenerational equity – "the right of all people within the current generation to fair access to the current generation's entitlement to the Earth's natural resources" – environmental equity considers the present generation under an obligation to account for long-term impacts of activities, and to act to sustain the global environment and resource base for future generations. Pollution control and resource management laws may be assessed against this principle.

Equity is approached by combatting social justice for the sake of reaching climate goals in having more sustainability. International law decided to shift from equality to equity in hopes of acknowledging the needs and provide fair share of resources. The CBDR principle had been established back in 2015, but was modified by the Paris Agreement regarding climate change.

=== Transboundary responsibility ===
Defined in the international law context as an obligation to protect one's own environment, and to prevent damage to neighboring environments, UNEP considers transboundary responsibility at the international level as a potential limitation on the rights of the sovereign state. Laws that act to limit externalities imposed upon human health and the environment may be assessed against this principle.

Community participation is analyzed through international law that looks into environmental law and cases such as genocide and providing aid. Such laws include heritage laws that describe the cultural aspect and property rights of others. Responsibilities include pollution damage among two states, leading to calamities for countries to deal with. Some countries contribute to transboundary pollution and pass on to other places to clean up, establishing laws to decide on holding countries liable on causing damage to resources. Having strict liability depends on negotiations done in international court and what values are held for environmental reasons.

=== Public participation and transparency ===
Identified as essential conditions for "accountable governments,... industrial concerns", and organizations generally, public participation and transparency are presented by UNEP as requiring "effective protection of the human right to hold and express opinions and to seek, receive and impart ideas,... a right of access to appropriate, comprehensible and timely information held by governments and industrial concerns on economic and social policies regarding the sustainable use of natural resources and the protection of the environment, without imposing undue financial burdens upon the applicants and with adequate protection of privacy and business confidentiality," and "effective judicial and administrative proceedings". These principles are present in environmental impact assessment, laws requiring publication and access to relevant environmental data, and administrative procedure.

Participating has shown to be more effective when trying to reach a point and use strategic matters for implementing action within policies. Public policies that are managed for sustainability would need financial incentives since the work put into these cases require lots of support and looking into ecological systems. International relations will need a relationship between participating in policy changes and TGI governance involvement. Debates with international relations still occur, focusing on the importance of participating in protecting natural resources by being involved with government policies.

=== Precautionary principle ===
One of the most commonly encountered and controversial principles of environmental law, the Rio Declaration formulated the precautionary principle as follows:

In order to protect the environment, the precautionary approach shall be widely applied by States according to their capabilities. Where there are threats of serious or irreversible damage, lack of full scientific certainty shall not be used as a reason for postponing cost-effective measures to prevent environmental degradation. The principle may play a role in any debate over the need for environmental regulation.

Precautions are done in regards of having higher levels of protection among resources such as human health concerns and conservation for protecting the environment. According to the EU, it has not properly defined the meaning of precautionary principle since it depends on protection of resources and policies implemented. The CJEU expressed the concern of “where there is uncertainty as to the existence or extent of human health, the institutions may take protective measures without having to wait until the reality and seriousness of those risks become fully apparent." Budgets are proposed for recovering any damages to resources done to communities in relation to water, air, and soil that may be impacted as a result of natural causes such as floods, droughts, hurricanes, and wildfires.

=== Prevention ===
The concept of prevention can perhaps better be considered an overarching aim that gives rise to a multitude of legal mechanisms, including prior assessment of environmental harm, licensing or authorization that set out the conditions for operation and the consequences for violation of the conditions, as well as the adoption of strategies and policies. Emission limits and other product or process standards, the use of best available techniques and similar techniques can all be seen as applications of the concept of prevention.

Prevention is necessary to avoid resources destroyed and the amount of budgeting needed to recover from incidents so communities don't fall apart. Natural disasters are unavoidable by taking action before the incident happens can result in safe evacuations. They can be predicted based on people who had previously encountered with a natural disaster. Prevention from pollution can happen if policies are made to either ban substances or reduce the intake of contaminants in air, water, and soil for healthy conditions. Wildlife can be conserved through foreign aid and taking further action through funding programs that protect against poachers who may be armed and affiliate with an organization.

=== Polluter pays principle ===
The polluter pays principle is the idea that "the environmental costs of economic activities, including the cost of preventing potential harm, should be internalized rather than imposed upon society at large." All issues related to responsibility for cost for environmental remediation and compliance with pollution control regulations involve this principle.

The rise of carbon emissions have resulted from corporations and facilities that fail to acknowledge the potential risks of climate change over time. Policies that cause environmental damage needs action done in hopes of preventing harm form happening again. Evidence of harm would need to be shown to see the damages done and how those get resolved. Government regulations may set aside the idea of conserving resources for their own benefit and not acknowledging those suffering from it.

== Theory ==
Environmental law is a continuing source of controversy. Debates over the necessity, fairness, and cost of environmental regulation are ongoing, as well as regarding the appropriateness of regulations versus market solutions to achieve even agreed-upon ends.

Allegations of scientific uncertainty fuel the ongoing debate over greenhouse gas regulation, and are a major factor in debates over whether to ban particular pesticides. In cases where the science is well-settled, it is not unusual to find that corporations intentionally hide or distort the facts, or sow confusion.

It is very common for regulated industry to argue against environmental regulation on the basis of cost. Difficulties arise in performing cost–benefit analysis of environmental issues. It is difficult to quantify the value of an environmental value such as a healthy ecosystem, clean air, or species diversity. Many environmentalists' response to pitting economy vs. ecology is summed up by former Senator and founder of Earth Day Gaylord Nelson, "The economy is a wholly owned subsidiary of the environment, not the other way around." Furthermore, environmental issues are seen by many as having an ethical or moral dimension, which would transcend financial cost. Even so, there are some efforts underway to systemically recognize environmental costs and assets, and account for them properly in economic terms.

While affected industries spark controversy in fighting regulation, there are also many environmentalists and public interest groups who believe that current regulations are inadequate, and advocate for stronger protection. Environmental law conferences – such as the annual Public Interest Environmental Law Conference in Eugene, Oregon – typically have this focus, also connecting environmental law with class, race, and other issues.

An additional debate is to what extent environmental laws are fair to all regulated parties. For instance, researchers Preston Teeter and Jorgen Sandberg highlight how smaller organizations can often incur disproportionately larger costs as a result of environmental regulations, which can ultimately create an additional barrier to entry for new firms, thus stifling competition and innovation.

== International environmental law ==
Global and regional environmental issues are increasingly the subject of international law. Debates over environmental concerns implicate core principles of international law and have been the subject of numerous international agreements and declarations.

Customary international law is an important source of international environmental law. These are the norms and rules that countries follow as a matter of custom and they are so prevalent that they bind all states in the world. When a principle becomes customary law is not clear cut and many arguments are put forward by states not wishing to be bound. Examples of customary international law relevant to the environment include the duty to warn other states promptly about icons of an environmental nature and environmental damages to which another state or states may be exposed, and Principle 21 of the Stockholm Declaration ('good neighborliness' or sic utere).

Given that customary international law is not static but ever evolving and the continued increase of air pollution (carbon dioxide) causing climate changes, has led to discussions on whether basic customary principles of international law, such as the jus cogens (peremptory norms) and erga omnes principles could be applicable for enforcing international environmental law.

Numerous legally binding international agreements encompass a wide variety of issue-areas, from terrestrial, marine and atmospheric pollution through to wildlife and biodiversity protection. International environmental agreements are generally multilateral (or sometimes bilateral) treaties (a.k.a. convention, agreement, protocol, etc.). Protocols are subsidiary agreements built from a primary treaty. They exist in many areas of international law but are especially useful in the environmental field, where they may be used to regularly incorporate recent scientific knowledge. They also permit countries to reach an agreement on a framework that would be contentious if every detail were to be agreed upon in advance. The most widely known protocol in international environmental law is the Kyoto Protocol, which followed from the United Nations Framework Convention on Climate Change.

While the bodies that proposed, argued, agreed upon, and ultimately adopted existing international agreements vary according to each agreement, certain conferences, including 1972's United Nations Conference on the Human Environment, 1983's World Commission on Environment and Development, 1992's United Nations Conference on Environment and Development, and 2002's World Summit on Sustainable Development have been particularly important. Multilateral environmental agreements sometimes create an International Organization, Institution or Body responsible for implementing the agreement. Major examples are the Convention on International Trade in Endangered Species of Wild Fauna and Flora (CITES) and the International Union for Conservation of Nature (IUCN).

International environmental law also includes the opinions of international courts and tribunals. While there are few and they have limited authority, the decisions carry much weight with legal commentators and are quite influential on the development of international environmental law. One of the biggest challenges in international decisions is to determine an adequate compensation for environmental damages. The courts include the International Court of Justice (ICJ), the International Tribunal for the Law of the Sea (ITLOS), the European Court of Justice, European Court of Human Rights and other regional treaty tribunals.

Previous research found that economic development level and the nations' moral value affected environmental regulation compliance. Developed countries like the US, EU, and Australia are urging for better laws targeting the reduction of harmful environmental impacts. It is worth noting that there is a direct correlation between economic development and the distance between law and ethics. Developed countries have a closer relationship between environmental laws and moral values. If a country's legal system is completely divorced from its moral values, people may not abide by the laws and they will lose their significance and effectiveness. Despite environmental regulations, the water in India's River Ganges remains poor as an example.

== Around the world ==
=== Africa ===
According to the International Network for Environmental Compliance and Enforcement (INECE), the major environmental issues in Africa are "drought and flooding, air pollution, deforestation, loss of biodiversity, freshwater availability, degradation of soil and vegetation, and widespread poverty." The U.S. Environmental Protection Agency (EPA) is focused on the "growing urban and industrial pollution, water quality, electronic waste and indoor air from cookstoves." They hope to provide enough aid on concerns regarding pollution before their impacts contaminate the African environment as well as the global environment. By doing so, they intend to "protect human health, particularly vulnerable populations such as children and the poor." In order to accomplish these goals in Africa, EPA programs are focused on strengthening the ability to enforce environmental laws as well as public compliance to them. Other programs work on developing stronger environmental laws, regulations, and standards.

=== Asia ===
The Asian Environmental Compliance and Enforcement Network (AECEN) is an agreement between 16 Asian countries dedicated to improving cooperation with environmental laws in Asia. These countries include Cambodia, China, Indonesia, India, Maldives, Japan, Korea, Malaysia, Nepal, Philippines, Pakistan, Singapore, Sri Lanka, Thailand, Vietnam, and Lao PDR.

=== European Union ===
The European Union issues secondary legislation on environmental issues that are valid throughout the EU (so called regulations) and many directives that must be implemented into national legislation from the 27 member states (national states). Examples are the Regulation (EC) No. 338/97 on the implementation of CITES; or the Natura 2000 network the centerpiece for nature & biodiversity policy, encompassing the bird Directive (79/409/EEC/ changed to 2009/147/EC)and the habitats directive (92/43/EEC). Which are made up of multiple SACs (Special Areas of Conservation, linked to the habitats directive) & SPAs (Special Protected Areas, linked to the bird directive), throughout Europe.

EU legislation is ruled in Article 249 Treaty for the Functioning of the European Union (TFEU). Topics for common EU legislation are:

- Climate change
- Air pollution
- Water protection and management
- Waste management
- Soil protection
- Protection of nature, species and biodiversity
- Noise pollution
- Cooperation for the environment with third countries (other than EU member states)
- Civil protection

In February 2024, the European Parliament adopted a law making a big, intentionally caused, environmental damage “comparable to ecocide” a crime that can be punished by up to 10 years in prison. The members of the Union should enter it to their national law, during 2 years. The Parliament also approved a nature restoration law which obligate members to restore 20% of degraded ecosystems (including 30% of drained peatland) by 2030 and 100% by 2050.

=== Middle East ===
Environmental law is rapidly growing in the Middle East. The U.S. Environmental Protection Agency is working with countries in the Middle East to improve "environmental governance, water pollution and water security, clean fuels and vehicles, public participation, and pollution prevention."

=== Oceania ===
The main concerns about environmental issues in Oceania are "illegal releases of air and water pollutants, illegal logging/timber trade, illegal shipment of hazardous wastes, including e-waste and ships slated for destruction, and insufficient institutional structure/lack of enforcement capacity". The Secretariat of the Pacific Regional Environmental Programme (SPREP) is an international organization between Australia, the Cook Islands, FMS, Fiji, France, Kiribati, Marshall Islands, Nauru, New Zealand, Niue, Palau, PNG, Samoa, Solomon Island, Tonga, Tuvalu, US, and Vanuatu. The SPREP was established in order to provide assistance in improving and protecting the environment as well as assure sustainable development for future generations.

=== Australia ===
Commonwealth v Tasmania (1983), also known as the "Tasmanian Dam Case", was a highly significant case in Australian environmental law.

The Environment Protection and Biodiversity Conservation Act 1999 is the centerpiece of environmental legislation in Australia. It sets up the "legal framework to protect and manage nationally and internationally important flora, fauna, ecological communities and heritage places" and focuses on protecting world heritage properties, national heritage properties, wetlands of international importance, nationally threatened species and ecological communities, migratory species, Commonwealth marine areas, Great Barrier Reef Marine Park, and the environment surrounding nuclear activities. However, it has been subject to numerous reviews examining its shortcomings, the latest taking place in mid-2020. The interim report of this review concluded that the laws created to protect unique species and habitats are ineffective.

=== Brazil ===
The Brazilian government created the Ministry of Environment in 1992 in order to develop better strategies for protecting the environment, using natural resources sustainably, and enforcing public environmental policies. The Ministry of Environment has authority over policies involving environment, water resources, preservation, and environmental programs involving the Amazon.

=== Colombia ===
Colombia has an environmental sanctioning procedure established by Law 1333 of 2009, which applies to individuals and companies that cause environmental damage without authorization, carry out construction without environmental permits, or affect protected areas. The Colombian Criminal Code also establishes crimes to protect natural resources and special protection zones, including ecocide for serious environmental damage, with penalties up to 140 months in prison.

=== Canada ===
The Department of the Environment Act establishes the Department of the Environment in the Canadian government as well as the position Minister of the Environment. Their duties include "the preservation and enhancement of the quality of the natural environment, including water, air and soil quality; renewable resources, including migratory birds and other non-domestic flora and fauna; water; meteorology;" The Environmental Protection Act is the main piece of Canadian environmental legislation that was put into place March 31, 2000. The Act focuses on "respecting pollution prevention and the protection of the environment and human health in order to contribute to sustainable development." Other principle federal statutes include the Canadian Environmental Assessment Act, and the Species at Risk Act. When provincial and federal legislation are in conflict federal legislation takes precedence, that being said individual provinces can have their own legislation such as Ontario's Environmental Bill of Rights, and Clean Water Act.

=== China ===
According to the U.S. Environmental Protection Agency, "China has been working with great determination in recent years to develop, implement, and enforce a solid environmental law framework. Chinese officials face critical challenges in effectively implementing the laws, clarifying the roles of their national and provincial governments, and strengthening the operation of their legal system." Explosive economic and industrial growth in China has led to significant environmental degradation, and China is currently in the process of developing more stringent legal controls. The harmonization of Chinese society and the natural environment is billed as a rising policy priority.

Environmental lawsuits have been available in China since the early 2000s. A 2014 amendment to the Environmental Protection Law gave non-governmental entities standing to bring public interest litigation against private enterprise responsible for environmental degradation. Public interest litigation filings increased further after the Tengger Desert case consolidated this change. Public protest, however, plays a greater role in shaping China's environmental policy than litigation does.

=== Congo (RC) ===
In the Republic of Congo, inspired by the African models of the 1990s, the phenomenon of constitutionalization of environmental law appeared in 1992, which completed an historical development of environmental law and policy dating back to the years of independence and even long before the colonization. It gives a constitutional basis to environmental protection, which traditionally was part of the legal framework. The two Constitutions of 15 March 1992 and 20 January 2002 concretize this paradigm, by stating a legal obligation of a clean environment, by establishing a principle of compensation and a foundation of criminal nature. By this phenomenon, Congolese environmental law is situated between non-regression and the search for efficiency."

=== Ecuador ===
With the enactment of the 2008 Constitution, Ecuador became the first country in the world to codify the Rights of Nature. The Constitution, specifically Articles 10 and 71–74, recognizes the inalienable rights of ecosystems to exist and flourish, gives people the authority to petition on the behalf of ecosystems, and requires the government to remedy violations of these rights. The rights approach is a break away from traditional environmental regulatory systems, which regard nature as property and legalize and manage degradation of the environment rather than prevent it.

The Rights of Nature articles in Ecuador's constitution are part of a reaction to a combination of political, economic, and social phenomena. Ecuador's abusive past with the oil industry, most famously the class-action litigation against Chevron, and the failure of an extraction-based economy and neoliberal reforms to bring economic prosperity to the region has resulted in the election of a New Leftist regime, led by President Rafael Correa, and sparked a demand for new approaches to development. In conjunction with this need, the principle of "Buen Vivir," or good living – focused on social, environmental and spiritual wealth versus material wealth – gained popularity among citizens and was incorporated into the new constitution.

The influence of indigenous groups, from whom the concept of "Buen Vivir" originates, in the forming of the constitutional ideals also facilitated the incorporation of the Rights of Nature as a basic tenet of their culture and conceptualization of "Buen Vivir."

=== Egypt ===
The Environmental Protection Law outlines the responsibilities of the Egyptian government to "preparation of draft legislation and decrees pertinent to environmental management, collection of data both nationally and internationally on the state of the environment, preparation of periodical reports and studies on the state of the environment, formulation of the national plan and its projects, preparation of environmental profiles for new and urban areas, and setting of standards to be used in planning for their development, and preparation of an annual report on the state of the environment to be prepared to the President."

=== India ===
In India, Environmental law is governed by the Environment Protection Act, 1986. This act is enforced by the Central Pollution Control Board and the numerous State Pollution Control Boards. Apart from this, there are also individual legislation specifically enacted for the protection of Water, Air, Wildlife, etc. Such legislations include :

- The Water (Prevention and Control of Pollution) Act, 1974
- The Water (Prevention and Control of Pollution) Cess Act, 1977
- The Forest (Conservation) Act, 1980
- The Air (Prevention and Control of Pollution) Act, 1981
- Air (Prevention and Control of Pollution) (Union Territories) Rules, 1983
- The Biological Diversity Act, 2002 and the Wild Life Protection Act, 1972
- Batteries (Management and Handling) Rules, 2001
- Recycled Plastics, Plastics Manufacture and Usage Rules, 1999
- The National Green Tribunal established under the National Green Tribunal Act of 2010 has jurisdiction over all environmental cases dealing with a substantial environmental question and acts covered under the Water (Prevention and Control of Pollution) Act, 1974.
- Water (Prevention and Control of Pollution) Cess Rules, 1978
- Ganga Action Plan, 1986
- The Forest (Conservation) Act, 1980
- Wildlife protection Act, 1972
- The Public Liability Insurance Act, 1991 and the Biological Diversity Act, 2002. The acts covered under Indian Wild Life Protection Act 1972 do not fall within the jurisdiction of the National Green Tribunal. Appeals can be filed in the Hon'ble Supreme Court of India.
- Basel Convention on Control of Transboundary Movements on Hazardous Wastes and Their Disposal, 1989 and Its Protocols
- Hazardous Wastes (Management and Handling) Amendment Rules, 2003

=== Japan ===
The Basic Environmental Law is the basic structure of Japan's environmental policies replacing the Basic Law for Environmental Pollution Control and the Nature Conservation Law. The updated law aims to address "global environmental problems, urban pollution by everyday life, loss of accessible natural environment in urban areas and degrading environmental protection capacity in forests and farmlands."

The three basic environmental principles that the Basic Environmental Law follows are "the blessings of the environment should be enjoyed by the present generation and succeeded to the future generations, a sustainable society should be created where environmental loads by human activities are minimized, and Japan should contribute actively to global environmental conservation through international cooperation." From these principles, the Japanese government have established policies such as "environmental consideration in policy formulation, establishment of the Basic Environment Plan which describes the directions of long-term environmental policy, environmental impact assessment for development projects, economic measures to encourage activities for reducing environmental load, improvement of social infrastructure such as sewerage system, transport facilities etc., promotion of environmental activities by corporations, citizens and NGOs, environmental education, and provision of information, promotion of science and technology."

=== New Zealand ===
The Ministry for the Environment and Office of the Parliamentary Commissioner for the Environment were established by the Environment Act 1986. These positions are responsible for advising the Minister on all areas of environmental legislation. A common theme of New Zealand's environmental legislation is sustainably managing natural and physical resources, fisheries, and forests. The Resource Management Act 1991 is the main piece of environmental legislation that outlines the government's strategy to managing the "environment, including air, water soil, biodiversity, the coastal environment, noise, subdivision, and land use planning in general."

=== Russia ===
The Ministry of Natural Resources and Environment of the Russian Federation makes regulation regarding "conservation of natural resources, including the subsoil, water bodies, forests located in designated conservation areas, fauna and their habitat, in the field of hunting, hydrometeorology and related areas, environmental monitoring and pollution control, including radiation monitoring and control, and functions of public environmental policy making and implementation and statutory regulation."

=== Singapore ===
Singapore is a signatory of the Convention on Biological Diversity; with most of its CBD obligations being overseen by the National Biodiversity Reference Centre, a division of its National Parks Board (NParks). Singapore is also a signatory of the Convention on International Trade in Endangered Animals, with its obligations under that treaty also being overseen by NParks. The Parliament of Singapore has enacted numerous pieces of legislation to fulfil its obligations under these treaties, such as the Parks and Trees Act, Endangered Species (Import and Export) Act, and Wildlife Act. The new Wildlife (Protected Wildlife Species) Rules 2020 marks the first instance in Singapore's history that direct legal protection has been offered for specific named species, as listed in Parts 1-5 of the Rules' schedule.

=== Thailand ===
As of December 2025, Thailand is on the verge of passing its first Climate Change Act. The Act includes a raft of measures, including climate mitigation, adaptation, carbon markets, taxes, planning systems and green finance. Some of the key features include the establishment of four national-level governance bodies and a Climate Fund to collect revenue from carbon-related mechanisms, like a new carbon tax. A national greenhouse gas registry will mandate private and public sector entities to collect and report emissions. An emissions trading system will also be established that will be used by companies in Thailand’s major polluting sectors: power sector firms, oil, gas and petrochemical companies, airlines and industrial and construction businesses.

=== Vietnam ===
Vietnam is currently working with the U.S. Environmental Protection Agency on dioxin remediation and technical assistance in order to lower methane emissions. In March 2002, the U.S. and Vietnam signed the U.S.-Vietnam Memorandum of Understanding on Research on Human Health and the Environmental Effects of Agent Orange/Dioxin.

== See also ==
- Climate target
- Energy law
- Environmental health
- Environmental justice
- Environmental racism
- Environmental racism in Europe
- Indigenous rights
- International law
- List of environmental law journals
- List of international environmental agreements
- List of years in the environment
- UK enterprise law
