= Forest Guard (Greece) =

Agency responsible for the protection of forests in Greece

The Forest Guard (Greek: Δασοφυλακή/Δασονομία, romanized: Dasofylakí/Dasonomía, is the name of the agency responsible for the protection of forests and implementation of the forestry law in Greece.

== History ==
The first agency for the protection of forests and fields was founded in 1836 as the Rural Police (Αγροφυλακή). In 1956, the Rural Police was organised along the standards of the Gendarmerie and became part of the Ministry of Public Order. In 1998, Greece transferred the responsibility for wildfire suppression and response from the forest service to the [Hellenic Fire Service]. This transfer of responsibility also included a transfer of various types of equipment, including the Forest Service's entire fleet of vehicles.

In 2011, the Rural Police was disestablished and its services were passed to the various regional forest services. These various regional forest services, grouped as the "Forest Command", form part of the Ministry of Agricultural Development and provide services all over Greece (Dasarcheio, Dasonomeio, Dasofylakeio). In 2017, common uniforms were adopted for all members of the Forest Guard.

== Sources ==
- Πολίτες δασοφύλακες, dasarxeio.com
