= Water quality modelling =

Prediction of water pollution using mathematical simulation techniques

Water quality modeling involves water quality based data using mathematical simulation techniques. Modeling helps people understand the importance of water quality issues and provides evidence for policy makers to make decisions in order to properly mitigate water pollution. Water quality modeling also helps determine correlations to constituent sources and water quality along with identifying information gaps. Due to increases in human use of fresh water, water quality modeling is especially relevant at both the local and global level. In order to understand and predict the changes over time in water scarcity, climate change, and the economic factor of water resources, water quality models depend on sufficient data by including water bodies from both local and global levels.

A typical water quality model consists of a collection of formulations representing physical mechanisms that determine position and momentum of pollutants in a water body. Models are available for individual components of the hydrological system such as surface runoff. Basin-wide models address hydrologic transport aspects and are used for ocean and estuarine applications. Finite difference methods are often used to analyze these phenomena, and, almost always, large complex computer models are required.

== Building a model ==
Various water quality models utilize different information, but generally have the same purpose, which is to provide evidentiary support of water issues. Models can be either deterministic or statistical, depending on the scale with the base model, which is dependent on whether the modeled area is on a local, regional, or a global scale. Another aspect to consider for a model is what needs to be understood or predicted about that research area, along with setting up any parameters to define the research. Another aspect of building a water quality model is knowing the audience and the exact purpose for presenting data, such as to enhance water quality management for water quality law makers for the best possible outcomes.

== Formulations and associated constants ==
Water quality is modeled by one or more of the following formulations:

- Advective Transport formulation
- Dispersive Transport formulation
- Surface Heat Budget formulation
- Dissolved Oxygen Saturation formulation
- Reaeration formulation
- Carbonaceous Deoxygenation formulation
- Nitrogenous Biochemical Oxygen Demand formulation
- Sediment oxygen demand formulation (SOD)
- Photosynthesis and Respiration formulation
- pH and Alkalinity formulation
- Nutrients formulation (fertilizers)
- Algae formulation
- Zooplankton formulation
- Coliform bacteria formulation (e.g. Escherichia coli )

=== SPARROW models ===
A SPARROW model ("SPAtially-Referenced Regression on Watershed" attributes) helps integrate water quality data with landscape information. More specifically the United States Geological Survey (USGS) uses this model to display long-term changes within watersheds to further explain in-stream water measurement in relation to upstream sources, water quality, and watershed properties. These models predict data for various spatial scales and integrate streamflow data with water quality at numerous locations across the US. One SPARROW model used by the USGS focused on the nutrients in major US rivers and estuaries. This model improved understanding of where nutrients come from, where they are transported to while in the water bodies, and where they end up (reservoirs, other estuaries, etc.).

== See also ==
- Hydrological transport models
- PCLake (eutrophication model)
- Stochastic Empirical Loading and Dilution Model
- Storm Water Management Model
- Streeter–Phelps equation
- Wastewater quality indicators
- Volumes of water on earth
- Water resources
