= Confédération Paysanne =

French organization

The Confédération Paysanne is a French agricultural union. It was a founding member of the Coordination Paysanne Européenne, Via Campesina and ATTAC.

The Confederation is considered left leaning. It is the second most popular French agricultural union, competing in popularity with the Coordination Rurale. Both received about 20% of the votes in the elections to the French chambers of agriculture in 2019, far behind the Fédération nationale des syndicats d'exploitants agricoles which totaled 55% on the joint lists with the Jeunes Agriculteurs union.

== See also ==
- Chamber of Agriculture in France
