= MODEF =

Movement for the Defense of Family Farmers
- Founded: 1959
- Type: Trade Union
- Headquarters: 14 Bd d'Aquitaine; 16000 Angoulême, France
- Region served: France
- General Secretary: Didier Gadéa
- President: Pierre Thomas
- Affiliations: Via Campesina
- Website: modef.fr

The Movement for the Defense of Family Farmers (Mouvement de défense des exploitants familiaux, MODEF) is a French agricultural union founded in 1959.

== History ==
=== Foundation ===
On 7 April 1959 approximately forty farming activists from southern and central French departments, primarily from tenant farmer and viticulture sectors of the FNSEA, gathered in Toulouse to establish a coordinating body. This initiative led to the creation of the Movement for the Defense of Family Farmers.

The founders were described as

socialists, like Nègre; communists, like Soulié; anarcho-communists, like Raymond Mineau; or simply activists for social progress.

Their goal was to break definitively with the FNSEA, then the sole agricultural union, by forming a dissident union movement that would focus on family farms.

The organization drew inspiration from the struggles of tenant farmers in Allier in 1900 and the 1907 vineyard workers' strike in the South. In a country still home to 2 million farmers, MODEF aimed to defend small family farms against large landowners who advocated for industrialized agriculture and farm consolidation—a trend emerging within the framework of the Common Agricultural Policy.

=== Evolution of MODEF ===
During the 1970s and 1980s, MODEF gained prominence, challenging FNSEA dominance in professional elections across several regions, particularly in the southwest, center, and southeast of France. However, the decline of small farms in the 1980s weakened MODEF’s electoral base among smallholders, relegating it to a marginal role in northern France. It remains entrenched in regions specializing in small-scale cereal farming, livestock, viticulture, fruit, and vegetable production, as well as in overseas departments like Martinique and Guadeloupe. During the 2007 agricultural chamber elections, MODEF garnered 2.6% of votes in the professional smallholder college.

== Politics ==
MODEF opposes the Agricultural Orientation Law and holds large agribusiness corporations and supermarkets accountable for the challenges facing agriculture. The union advocates for guaranteed minimum prices for all products to support small and medium-sized farms, ensure production quality, mitigate natural disadvantages, and promote agriculture's role in land management and environmental conservation.

Adhering to its slogan of "a remunerative, civic, and sustainable agriculture", MODEF criticizes the global liberalization of trade, production relocations, and social dumping. The union opposes the concentration of agribusiness and calls for cooperative tools to preserve sovereignty and food security. MODEF prioritizes public market interventions, such as import controls and regulation of speculative practices in the food supply chain. Additionally, it demands the exemption of agricultural products from free-market competition rules at the European Union and World Trade Organization levels.

MODEF also advocates for participatory democracy in agriculture, seeking the repeal of the decree requiring 15% support for syndicate representation in consular elections and inclusive decision-making processes for agricultural land development and funding organizations.

Since 2001, as a member of Via Campesina, MODEF has embraced altermondialist initiatives and campaigned for a combative and unifying trade union movement.

The union has been led by Pierre Thomas since April 2019, who succeeded Jean Mouzat.

== See also ==
- Chamber of Agriculture in France
