= PCLake =

Mathematical model of eutrophication effects in shallow lakes

PCLake is a dynamic, mathematical model used to study eutrophication effects in shallow lakes and ponds. PCLake models explicitly the most important biotic groups and their interrelations, within the general framework of nutrient cycles. PCLake is used both by scientist and water managers. PCLake is in 2019 extended to PCLake+, which can be applied to stratifying lakes.

== Background ==
Typically, shallow lakes are in one of two contrasting alternative stable states: a clear state with submerged macrophytes and piscivorous fish, or a turbid state dominated by phytoplankton and benthivorous fish. A switch from one state to the other is largely driven by the input of nutrients (phosphorus and nitrogen) to the ecosystem. If the nutrient loading exceeds a critical value, eutrophication causes a switch from the clear to the turbid state. As a result of urban water pollution and/or intensive agriculture in catchment areas, many of the world’s shallow lakes and ponds are in a eutrophic state with turbid waters and poor ecological quality. In this turbid state, the lake also becomes subject to algal blooms of toxic cyanobacteria (also called blue-green algae). Recovery of the clear state however is difficult as the critical nutrient loading for the switch back is often found to be lower than the critical loading towards the turbid state. Lowering the nutrient input thus does not automatically lead to a switch back to the clear water phase. Hence, the system shows hysteresis.

== Application ==
PCLake is designed to study the effects of eutrophication on shallow lakes and ponds. On one hand, the model is used by scientists to study the general behavior of these ecosystems. For example, PCLake is used to understand the phenomena of alternative stable states and hysteresis, and in that light, the relative importance of lake features such as water depth or fetch length. Also the potential effects of climate warming for shallow lakes have been studied. On the other hand, PCLake is applied by lake water resource managers that consider the turbid state as undesirable. They can use the model to define the critical loadings for their specific lakes and evaluate the effectiveness of restoration measures. For this purpose also a meta-model has been developed. The meta-model can be used by water managers to derive an estimate of the critical loading values for a certain lake based on only a few important parameters, without the need of running the full dynamical model.

Lakes that have been simulated using PCLake
nr	Lake name	Country	Depth (m)	Lake Area (km^{2})
1	Hollands-Ankeveen	Netherlands	1.3	0.85
2	Bergse Achterplas	Netherlands	2.0	0.41
3	Bergse Voorplas	Netherlands	2.0	0.60
4	Beulakerwijde	Netherlands	1.8	13.00
5	Botshol, Grote Wije	Netherlands	2.0	0.53
6	Kaag, Norremeer	Netherlands	2.4	3.20
7	Langeraar, Geerplas	Netherlands	1.9	0.28
8	Loosdrecht	Netherlands	2.2	9.40
9	Naarden, Grote Meer	Netherlands	1.3	1.70
10	Naarden, Wijde Blik	Netherlands	1.0	0.38
11	Reeuwijk, Nieuwenbroek	Netherlands	1.8	1.04
12	Nieuwkoop, Noordeinder	Netherlands	3.0	1.50
13	Nieuwkoop, Zuideinder	Netherlands	3.0	1.00
14	Reeuwijk, Elfhoeven	Netherlands	2.0	1.09
15	Westeinderplassen	Netherlands	2.8	8.52
16	Zuidlaardermeer	Netherlands	1.0	6.00
17	Nannewijd	Netherlands	1.0	1.00
18	Blankaart	Belgium	1.0	0.30
19	Maten 13	Belgium	0.8	0.03
20	Visvijver	Belgium	0.8	0.01
21	Gara, South	Ireland	1.0	2.03
22	Maumwee	Ireland	2.0	0.27
23	Mullagh	Ireland	2.3	0.35
24	Pollaphuca	Ireland	6.8	19.74
25	Ramor	Ireland	3.0	7.41
26	Luknajno	Poland	1.8	6.30
27	Waalboezem	Netherlands	3.8	0.78
28	Binnenbedijkte Maas	Netherlands	4.0	1.58
29	Brielse Meer	Netherlands	5.5	4.91
30	Volkerak	Netherlands	5.0	45.70
31	Zoommeer	Netherlands	6.0	15.80
32	Oude Venen 2	Netherlands	1.3	0.10
33	Veluwemeer	Netherlands	1.6	32.40
34	Wolderwijd	Netherlands	1.9	18.00
35	Nuldernauw	Netherlands	2.1	8.70
36	Drontermeer	Netherlands	1.3	5.40
37	Braassemermeer	Netherlands	3.9	4.52
38	Langeraar, Noordeinde	Netherlands	1.9	0.75
39	Mooie Nel	Netherlands	4.5	1.16
40	Het Hol	Netherlands	1.0	0.30
41	Kortenhoef	Netherlands	1.2	1.93
42	Stichts-Ankeveen	Netherlands	1.0	1.00
43	Frisian Lakes (average)	Netherlands	1.4	5.18
44	Enso	Denmark	1.9	0.11
45	Nederso	Denmark	1.6	0.14
46	Soby	Denmark	3.0	0.72
47	Hinge	Denmark	1.2	0.91
48	Kvind	Denmark	1.9	0.15
49	Lading	Denmark	1.0	0.45
50	Silkeborg-Langso	Denmark	2.0	0.46
51	Honda	Spain	1.0	0.09
52	Nueva	Spain	1.5	0.27
53	Botshol Kleine Wije	Spain	1.7	0.21
54	Taihu	China	1.9	2250
55	Dianchi	China	4.4	298
56	Chaohu	China	2.5	760

== Model content ==
Mathematically, PCLake is composed of a set of coupled differential equations. With a large number of state variables (>100) and parameters (>300), the model may be characterized as relatively complex. The main biotic variables are phytoplankton and submerged aquatic vegetation, describing primary production. A simplified food web is made up of zooplankton, zoobenthos, young and adult whitefish and piscivorous fish. The main abiotic factors are transparency and the nutrients phosphorus (P), nitrogen (N) and silica (Si). At the base of the model are the water and nutrient budgets (in- and outflow). The model describes a completely mixed water body and comprises both the water column and the upper sediment layer. The overall nutrient cycles for N, P and Si are described as completely closed (except for in- and outflow and denitrification). Inputs to the model are: lake hydrology, nutrient loading, dimensions and sediment characteristics. The model calculates chlorophyll-a, transparency, cyanobacteria, vegetation cover and fish biomass, as well as the concentrations and fluxes of nutrients N, P and Si, and oxygen. Optionally, a wetland zone with marsh vegetation and water exchange with the lake can be included.

PCLake is calibrated against nutrient, transparency, chlorophyll and vegetation data on more than 40 European (but mainly Dutch) lakes, and systematic sensitivity and uncertainty analysis have been performed. Although PCLake is primarily used for Dutch lakes, it is likely that the model is also applicable to comparable non-stratifying lakes in other regions, if parameters are adjusted or some small changes to the model are made.

== Model development ==
The first version of PCLake (by then called PCLoos) was built in the early 1990s at the Netherlands National Institute for Public Health and the Environment (RIVM), within the framework of a research and restoration project on Lake Loosdrecht. It has been extended and improved since then. Parallel to PCLake, PCDitch was created, which is an ecosystem model for ditches and other linear water bodies. The models were further developed by dr. Jan H. Janse and colleagues at the Netherlands Environmental Assessment Agency (PBL), formerly part of the RIVM. Since 2009, the model is jointly owned by PBL and the Netherlands Institute of Ecology, where further development and application of PCLake is taking place, related to aquatic-ecological research.

== See also ==
- Ecosystem model
- Water quality modelling
- Ecopath
