= Chamber of Agriculture in France =

French consular organization representing the agriculture

Chambers of Commerce, Agriculture, and Crafts in France
- Chambres de commerce, d'agriculture et de métiers en France
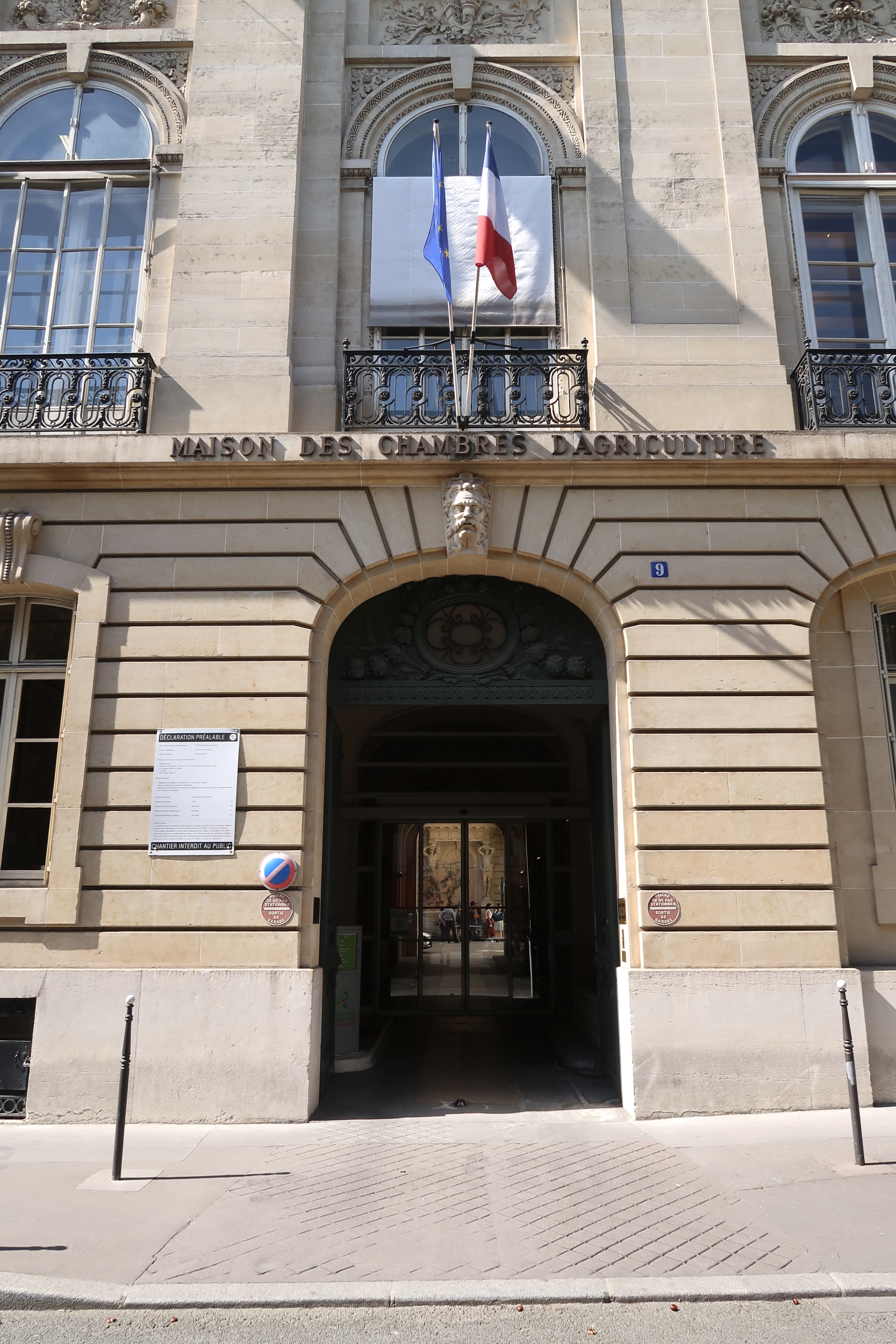
- House of the Chambers of Agriculture, 9 avenue George-V (Paris).
- Formation: January 3, 1924
- Type: Consular chamber: Chamber of Agriculture; Chamber of Commerce and Industry; Chamber of Trades and Crafts
- Purpose: Representing and supporting professionals in agriculture, commerce, industry, and crafts.
- Headquarters: Paris, France
- Location: France
- Official language: French
- Website: www.chambres-agriculture.fr

The Chambers of Agriculture are consular organizations (chambre consulaire). They were founded in France by the Law of January 3, 1924. Their role is to representing all the different economic agents involved in agriculture: farmers, but also landowners, employees, and agricultural organizations such as mutual societies, cooperatives, credit unions, and general-purpose unions; and support farmers in their development.

They can also be called upon by local authorities to address regional development issues.

== History ==
In 1840, Marshal Bugeaud, then deputy for the Dordogne, proposed a law to create chambers of agriculture. It was not adopted. Numerous attempts were made, with varying degrees of success. On January 3, 1924, the law on chambers of agriculture was promulgated, followed in 1927 by the adoption of the first law creating resources for chambers of agriculture.

== Departmental chambers of agriculture ==
=== Traditional responsibilities ===
At the departmental level, the Chambers of Agriculture are responsible for several mandatory public services:

- business formalities center (CFE) registration of agricultural businesses;
- animal identification registration.

They play an essential role in providing information and assistance to farmers. They also have SUAD (Services d'utilité agricole et de développement) and training bodies whose employees provide information and training to farmers.

=== New powers (2010) ===
The departmental Chamber of Agriculture is the consultative, representative and professional body for agricultural interests vis-à-vis public bodies (art. L. 511-1 et seq. of the French Rural Code). Its remit is therefore fundamentally agricultural.

Law no. 2010-874 of July 27, 2010, on the modernization of agriculture introduces a provision into the Forestry Code specifying the competence of chambers of agriculture in forestry matters. The forestry code has existed since 1827, and in the 20th century, a very distinct rural code was drawn up. This is the first time that such a division has been introduced into the Forestry Code.

The departmental and regional chambers of agriculture are thus empowered to contribute to the development of woods and forests and to promote forest-related agricultural activities. They carry out actions concerning:

- developing privately owned woods and forests;
- the development of activities combining agriculture and forestry, in particular agroforestry;
- promoting the use of timber and wood energy;
- legal and accounting assistance in the field of forest employment;
- training and dissemination of the techniques needed to achieve these objectives. “These actions are implemented by the chambers of agriculture in conjunction with the regional forest property centers, the organizations representing forest communities, and the National Forestry Office. They exclude all commercial activities involving direct management, project management, or marketing." (Art. L. 221-11 of the French Rural Code).

=== Organization ===
There are 94 chambers in all, including the overseas departments. As a general rule, each department has its chamber of agriculture. However, some chambers may cover several departments. Recently, a chamber of agriculture, a member of the national network, was created in Mayotte. Chambers with special statutes also exist in New Caledonia and Tahiti.

The chambers have considerable resources at their disposal: around 8,000 employees, including 6,000 engineers and technicians, and a total consolidated budget of 702 million euros.

== Regional Chambers of Agriculture ==
Each French region has a regional chamber of agriculture, whose elected members are drawn from the departmental chambers.

The role of these regional chambers is to coordinate and plan agricultural development at the regional level, to coordinate and ensure the smooth running of the departmental chambers amongst themselves, and to represent and dialogue with the Regional Council and regional government departments, in particular the Prefecture and the DRAAF. This latter role has gained in importance since decentralization.

Among other things, the Regional Chambers of Agriculture are responsible for coordinating the activities of the Chambers in their region in terms of research, experimentation, and support for innovation in agriculture. They coordinate the Regional Agricultural and Rural Development Programs, with financial support from the Compte d'Affectation Spécial Développement Agricole et Rural (CasDAR).

=== The merger of departmental chambers of agriculture into a regional chamber of agriculture ===
On January 1, 2024, the four Breton departmental chambers of agriculture and the regional chamber of Brittany merged by decree. The five entities are now the same, under the name of Chamber of Agriculture in Brittany, whose usual acronym is CAB. The four departmental chambers of agriculture are now territorial chambers, attached to the Chamber of Agriculture in Brittany.

== Permanent Assembly of Chambers of Agriculture (APCA) ==
APCA was the national level of the Chambers of Agriculture network. APCA became Chambers of Agriculture France in 2022. It is an associate member of the French Agricultural Council.

The president of Chambers of Agriculture France is Sébastien Windsor, president of the Normandy Chamber of Agriculture, vice-president of the Avril group, president of FDSEA-76, and vice-president of the FOP. He succeeded Claude Cochonneau, who died accidentally on December 22, 2019, during his term of office. He was president of FSDEA-72 and previously mayor of Marçon. Previous presidents are Joseph Faure (Corrèze, 1927-1940), René Blondelle (FSDEA-02, 1952-1971), Pierre Collet (the Loire, 1971-1974), Louis Perrin (FSDEA-28, 1974 - 1989), Pierre Cormorèche (FSDEA-01, 1989-1995), Jean-François Hervieu (FSDEA-27, 1995-2001), Luc Guyau (FSDEA-85, 2001-2010), Guy Vasseur (FSDEA-41, 2010-2016).

=== Lobbying at the French National Assembly ===
The APCA is registered as an interest representative with the French National Assembly. In 2012, it declared an erroneous overall budget of 27 euros and indicated that annual costs linked to direct interest representation activities with Parliament are between 50,000 and 100,000 euros.

The APCA contributes to the financing of the “Club de la table française” parliamentary club via the lobbying firm Com' Publics.

=== Research and development activities ===
The APCA coordinates networks of Chambers of Agriculture advisors, to help them adapt their support to farmers and other rural stakeholders.

It also promotes the involvement of the consular network in research and development projects financed by the CasDAR at the national level and by Horizon 2020 at the European level. As such, since 2019, APCA has been leading the European i2connect project on support for interactive innovation.

== Elections ==
=== Representing the agricultural and rural world ===
The 45 to 48 elected members per chamber are appointed every six years by direct universal suffrage and represent farmers (21), former farmers (2), landowners (2), production employees (4), organization employees (4), professional groups (11) and the CRPF (1 to 4).

The electorate represents 3,000,000 people and 50,000 professional groups. The rate of participation (66% in the farmers' college in 2007) lends a certain legitimacy to its representatives, even if the agricultural world is plural. But since then, participation has fallen by 20 points: 54% in 2013, 46% in 2019.

The Chamber of Agriculture is the only consular chamber in which employees are represented.

For the main college of farm managers and assimilated and that of salaried employees, the voting system is a single-round, proportional list system with a majority bonus, i.e. the list that comes first automatically wins half the seats, with the remainder shared out on a proportional basis. For the other colleges, the vote is by majority. After these elections, which take place in January in each department, the department chambers of agriculture elect the 11 regional chambers of agriculture in March, who in turn elect the president of the chambers of agriculture at the end of March.

=== Recent election trends ===
Results of the Latest Elections
Organization	1983 Results	1989 Results	1995 Results	2001 Results	2007 Results	2013 Results	2019 Results
FNSEA/JA	65–69%	64%	60%	52.8%	54.9%	53.39%	55.31%
Rural Coordination	6% (FFA)	5% (FFA)	12%	12.2%	18.7%	20.49%	21.54%
Peasant Confederation	7% (CNSTP) + 5% (FNSP)	8%	20%	26.8%	19.6%	18.54%	20.04%
Others	?	?	?	2.4%	4.1%	1.53%	1.21%
MODEF	8.5%	8%	5%	2.9%	2.6%	1.47%	1.89%
FNSEA Affiliates	?	?	?	1.4%	1.9%	1.35%	–
FNSEA Union / Others				–	0.1%	–	–

The results of the 2019 Chambers of Agriculture elections (held from January 21 to 31) brought no surprises at the national level. The FNSEA-JA duo confirmed their absolute majority within the consular organizations. The Rural Coordination has also consolidated its second-place position and will head the chambers in 3 departments. The Confédération Paysanne made slight progress, but will no longer manage any departments, while Modef fell below the 2% mark. On the other hand, voter turnout was historically low, at around 46.52%, almost 8 points lower than in 2013. At the local level, a small game of musical chairs took place at the margins.

== Funding and budget ==
In 2005, around half the revenue of the Chambers of Agriculture came from the "additional tax to the tax on unbuilt land" (TATFNB - an additional tax on undeveloped land), with the remainder coming from subsidies and the paid services they provide.

In 2016, their budget totaled 720 million euros, of which personnel costs accounted for almost two-thirds. Between 1995 and 2015, the payroll rose from 6,000 to 7,600 FTEs, while the number of farms was halved (from 800,000 to 410,000).

== Criticism ==
Chambers of agriculture are criticized by researchers and skeptics alike for their permeability to pseudoscience, which is problematic given that they are state-funded. They spend, and encourage others to spend, considerable amounts of money on training in pseudoscience such as geobiology, radiesthesia, and dowsing.

== See also ==
- Syndicat agricole
- Fédération nationale des syndicats d'exploitants agricoles
- Confédération Paysanne
- MODEF
- Forestry law
