= Forestry law =

Field of law

Forestry laws govern activities in designated forest lands, most commonly with respect to forest management and timber harvesting. Forestry laws generally adopt management policies for public forest resources, such as multiple use and sustained yield. Forest management is split between private and public management, with public forests being sovereign property of the State. Forestry laws are now considered an international affair.

Governmental agencies are generally responsible for planning and implementing forestry laws on public forest lands, and may be involved in forest inventory, planning, and conservation, and oversight of timber sales. Forestry laws are also dependent on social and economic contexts of the region in which they are implemented. The development of scientific forestry management is based on the precise measurement of the distribution and volume of wood in a given parcel, the systematic felling of trees, and their replacement by standard, carefully aligned rows of mono-cultural plantations that could be harvested at set times.

== Purpose ==
Forestry laws are intended to protect resources and prevent forest clearing, logging, hunting, and collecting vegetation. However, there are no clear limitations set within these laws in regards to allowable cuts, harvesting rotations, and minimum harvesting diameters. Forest management plans state goals for the upkeep of the land, as well as steps to achieve them. foresters create management plans that account for each differentiated forest itself.

In some cases, plans are made with the assumption that ecosystems within a forest are holding a steady state, separate from the forest that surrounds them. Many foresters who are in third world countries do not have the knowledge nor training to follow by all the guidelines when making a management plan.

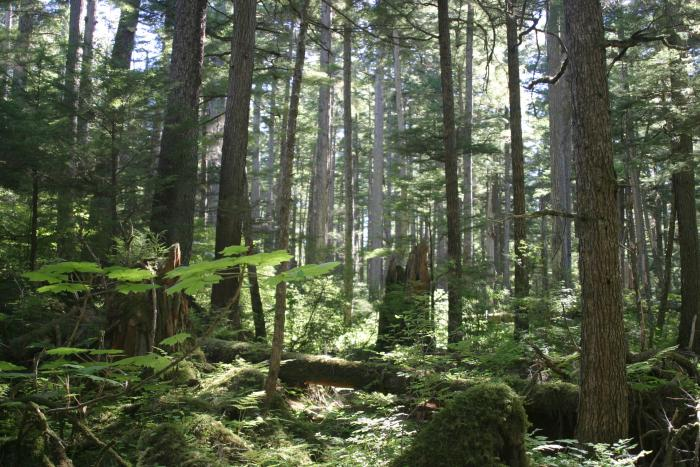
Tongass National Forest

Appropriate public policies and legislation serve to foster sustainable economic and social development in rural and urban areas. These policies work to safeguard the environment and protect flora, fauna and cultural heritage. Traditionally, environmental protection has been an element of forestry through emphasizing forest conservation and accounting for environmental impacts on soil and water. In common with other sectors, forestry has been affected by the emergence of environmental awareness and legislation in the last generation. This has brought greater emphasis on the protection of wilderness and aesthetic values.

== Influences ==
Biological diversity and climate change have specifically influenced forest law. When forest management plans are created, biological diversity is represented in criteria for sustainability. Due to the Kyoto Protocol, the mitigation of climate change has become an objective of forest law and policy, complementing broader climate policies and programs. However, Rosenbaum and colleagues state that there is little legislation containing specific provisions for mitigating forest-based climate change.

The connections between forest and other areas of law have become more complex as they have grown in ambition and scope and as other areas directly and indirectly place guidelines on how forests are managed or used. Thus the links between a country's forest laws and its general environmental laws become more important as the environmental dimensions of forest legislation increase in complexity.

Forest legislation now recognizes the role of forests as a habitat for wildlife, a resource for grazing and agriculture, and a contributor to water and soil conservation. More recently, the general principles of environmental law and the more specific values of biological diversity have become a very visible part of forest law. The UN Forum on Forests, an intergovernmental policy forum created in 2000, has adopted resolutions on the sustainable development of forests, especially those on Social and Cultural Aspects of Forest and Traditional Forest-Related Knowledge.

== International ==
Due to variations in nature, importance, role of forest resources and legal and institutional settings, forest law is not easily adapted between countries. The World Bank states that despite comparative studies of trends in forest legislation, there is a lack of practical guidance on how to assess improve the law.

Actual practices differ from one country to the next, however, in all cases public forests are viewed as a national resource, that is, the sovereign property of the state. For example, even though most forest land in the United States and Canada is privately owned, a considerable amount is held by the state as a "public good" but systematically leased to private timber producers. In India, the Raj took ownership of virtually all forests, declaring them to be "wasteland" and, therefore, unowned. In Indonesia, forests are legally state owned but are treated as private property, while in Brazil, the lack of national government renders forests open access commons. In this role, the conservation of forests is tightly linked to the production of timber and other commodities that generate both capital and jobs, and the economies of large regions are almost wholly dependent on natural resource production from those forests.

United Nations Forest Management Plan

New forest laws have been adopted in Eastern European countries as part of their transition to a market economy. These laws had considerable effect on the structure of forest land ownership, improvements in management regulations, and modernization of the forest sector's institutional framework. New forest legislation has also been developed in several countries in Western Europe in order to adapt to changing economic conditions, social demands, and more political participation of interest groups and citizens at local and regional levels.

=== Economic and social context ===
The evolution of forest legislation in the European Countries indicates that understanding of how natural resources are to be used in a sustainable manner depends on a given economic and social context. The meaning of sustainable forestry is determined by local circumstances and their significance has considerably changed over time. Today sustainable management is understood as forestry practices which respect the naturally given potentials of the ecosystems and maintain the diversity of forests in their typical landscapes. They leave multiple options for an increasing production of wood, protection of the environment, and recreation.

=== Regulation of use ===
Public provisions referring to forest uses over more than one generation are among the oldest forms of long-term environmental policies. Customary law, codified in the 14th century, regulated forest uses in accordance with the demands and options of their times. An increasing number of forest and timber ordinances, issued from the 16th century onward, followed. Meeting local needs, long-term availability of raw materials and energy, and increased outputs through better forestry practices were the issues at stake. Legislation established the requirement of a continuous flow of wood production, which meant stopping exploitation of what was available. It recognized the long-term nature of forests, and promoted the involvement of several generations in forestry activities. Increasingly, it provided for planning and management, and for measures of regeneration and reforestation. This introduced principles of utilizing renewable natural resources as a requirement for sustainability as we understand it today.

== United States of America Forestry Law ==
In the USA the Federal Government manages about 33% of forests, and 9% is managed by local governments. This accounts for 343,901,880 acres (1391722 kilometers) of forest land. Much of this land is made up of National Parks or National Forests which began with the establishment of Yellowstone National Park in 1872. After this, in 1891, the Forest Reserve Act was passed. The National Parks are managed by the National Park Service (NPS), which is a bureau of the Department of the Interior (DOI). National Forests are managed by the U.S. Forest Service (USFS), an agency of the U.S. Department of Agriculture (USDA).

== Economics ==
New policies place responsibilities for, and powers over, wood fuel management into the hands of economically interested individuals and the Forest Service. The Forest Service maintains complete control of all production and management decisions through required approval and through control of the rules by which production and management can take place.

The role of private forestry reaches up to over 80 percent of forest production in some countries. However, in many countries, private forestry has never been significant and, even when land has been privatized, the state has often retained the forests. In much of Africa, individual land ownership is relatively limited so that the closest approach to private forestry is usually community forestry (although South Africa and Eswatini, among other countries, have extensive private plantations). More recently, the values of farm forestry and of private capital and management have increased official interest in private forestry.

Illegal forestry activities deprive governments of billions of dollars in tax revenues, as well as cause environmental damage and threaten forests. Forest related corruption and widespread violation of forestry laws undermines the rule of law, discourages legitimate investment, and gives unfair advantages. Money generated from illegal forestry activities has even been used to finance armed conflict. Concern about the extent to which illegal logging has been contributing to forest loss has grown sharply since the 1980s. A very large proportion of the timber entering both national and international markets has been accessed, harvested, transported and traded in contravention of national law in countries such as Bolivia, Brazil, Cambodia, Cameroon, Colombia, Honduras, Indonesia, Nicaragua, Peru, Philippines, and Russia.

The World Bank (2002) estimates that illegal logging results in an annual loss of around US$10–15 billion in developing countries worldwide. Although it is anticipated that better governance, increased rent capture by the state, and improved forest management can all benefit the poor indirectly, the direct impacts of illegal logging and forest law enforcement on rural livelihoods have not been a priority consideration to date.

== Livelihood ==
The ways in which people use and value forests are changing. Growing populations, changing culture, technology, and science are increasing the demand for forest resources. In recent years forest laws around the world have been significantly revised in response to these changes. However, the lack of information about who really uses forests presents a major problem to forestry policy makers and supportive development agencies that are mandated to adopt a pro-poor approach. Without clear data it becomes all too easy to overlook the interests of lower income individuals when designing policy interventions aimed at improving forest management or asserting forest law. Some forest laws specifically favor poor rural households and ethnic minorities. Over the last few decades, many governments in Latin America recognized indigenous peoples' rights over large territories, but indigenous people often find it difficult to protect those territories from invasion by loggers, miners, and farmers.

According to the World Bank, "more than 1.6 billion people depend to varying degrees on forests for their livelihoods. About 60 million indigenous people are almost wholly dependent on forests. Some 350 million people who live in or adjacent to dense forests depend on them to a high degree for subsistence and income. In developing countries about 1.2 billion people rely on agroforestry farming systems that help to sustain agricultural productivity and generate income."

Schmithüsen et al., advocate for a rights-based approach to forestry management with emphasis upon strengthening human rights networks, improving the independence of the judiciary, promoting legal literacy among rural communities, and providing legal aid; rather than a singular focus on forestry laws. They state a rights-based approach should be linked to governance reform programs aimed at creating public accountability and transparency in the management of natural resources and should be developed through processes of broad engagement with civil society organizations and based on national governments' commitments to reform law.

A large portion of forestry legislation focuses on administrative requirements, fees, taxes, and property rights. The recognition of traditional-group rights to areas used in common, such as forest or pasture is still lacking, despite governments or colonial powers recognizing individual claims, based on custom or usage, to land used for agriculture or housing. according to the World Bank. By treating such land as "empty" during the process of settling rights, governments around the world have vested in the state ownership of vast expanses of forest land.

== Enforcement ==
Law enforcement is the last resort for obtaining compliance with the law. There are at least three approaches to overcoming the difficulties of proving offenses that have taken place in remote locations. One is to focus enforcement on more visible acts, such as transport. Another, common in civil law, is to make the official report of a sworn official admissible as evidence in further proceedings. This effectively shifts the burden of proof to the defendant. A third device is the use of evidentiary presumptions, which similarly shifts the burden of proof to the defendant.

In many countries the contrast between what forestry law prescribes and practical implementation may vary. Even where the law is strong, illegal behavior by both public and private actors often continues. The United Nations explains illegal behavior due to the lack of financial and human resources to monitor and control forest activities in, forest departments. As these forest activities occur in remote areas, government officials may be under immense pressure to condone violations, or engage in violations themselves; court systems are backlogged or bankrupt; the difficulties of daily life for the rural poor may overwhelm any likely risks associated with violating the law; etc.

These explanations underscore the point that while good forestry legislation is necessary, it is obviously not sufficient. The laws in many countries lie unused or underused for reasons like failure of political will, weak institutions, or even general disregard for the rule of law.

A dual approach of private as well as public law schemes might possibly become an interesting modern policy mix enhancing enforcement: private law certification schemes might support public regulations (f.i. DDS, due diligence systems, like the EU Timber Regulation).

== History and development ==
Forestry management dates back to customary law codified in the 14th century. In 1992, representatives of 180 countries met in Rio de Janeiro to consider, among other things, the adoption of an Agreement on Forestry Principles. They adopted the Agreement on Forestry Principles, entitled a "Non-legally binding authoritative statement of principles for a global consensus on the management, conservation and sustainable development of all types of forests."

Scientific forestry was based on the precise measurement of the distribution and volume of wood in a given parcel, the systematic felling of trees, and their replacement by standard, carefully aligned rows of mono-cultural plantations that could be harvested at set times.

The tendencies that become apparent from recent changes in forest laws and regulations in several European countries show a variety of approaches and may be judged from different point of views. Relevant criteria for analysis on the advancement of legislation are consistency, comprehensiveness, subsidiarity, and applicability.

Consistency requires the compatibility of forest regulations with constitutional values and democratic rules, with national policies addressing land-use, economic development and environmental protection, and with international commitments and multilateral agreements. Comprehensiveness refers to the objectives of forest legislation with regard to forest protection and forestry development, to different types of forest tenures, and to the rights and responsibilities of various categories of forest owners. Subsidiarity relates to the role of forests as national, regional and local resources. It also relates to the double nature of forests as private production means that may be used according to the decisions of land owners and as resources that yield numerous benefits to the community. Subsidiarity indicates to what extent public programs support the activities of land owners. Applicability refers in particular to the organisational framework of public forest administrations in relation to changing responsibilities and tasks, and to appropriate forms of participation of forest owners and interest groups in regulating forest uses and management practices. Coordination of competencies among public entities is an important aspect in evaluating the applicability of new or amended regulations.

== See also ==
- List of types of formally designated forests
- Royal forest
- Chamber of Agriculture in France
