= Environmental cleanup law =

Area of law

Environmental cleanup laws govern the removal of pollution or contaminants from environmental media such as soil, sediment, surface water, or ground water. Unlike pollution control laws, cleanup laws are designed to respond after-the-fact to environmental contamination, and consequently must often define not only the necessary response actions, but also the parties who may be responsible for undertaking (or paying for) such actions. Regulatory requirements may include rules for emergency response, liability allocation, site assessment, remedial investigation, feasibility studies, remedial action, post-remedial monitoring, and site reuse.

Different laws may govern the cleanup or remediation of varying environmental media. Spill response or cleanup requirements may be enacted as stand-alone laws, or as parts of larger laws focused on a specific environmental medium or pollutant.

== Resource Conservation and Recovery Act ==
Seal of the United States Environmental Protection Agency

The Resource Conservation and Recovery Act or RCRA is an act that gives the EPA the authority to regulate and control hazardous waste. This includes generation, transportation, treatment, storage, and disposal of hazardous waste.

=== Waste Chemical Cleanup Enforcement ===
One of EPA's top priorities is to protect communities disproportionately affected by pollution through environmental justice work.

EPA and the states verify RCRA compliance through a compliance monitoring program which includes inspecting facilities, reviewing records and taking enforcement action when there are violations.

=== Asbestos Hazard Emergency Response Act ===
This act is how the EPA handles asbestos that is discovered in schools as well as government employees who aren't protected under the Occupational Safety and Health Act.

=== Toxic Substance Control Act ===
This act regulates chemical manufacturers and importers by requiring reporting, record keeping, and testing of the chemicals.

== Comprehensive Environmental Response, Compensation, and Liability Act ==
The Comprehensive Environmental Response, Compensation, and Liability Act or CERCLA is an act that provides a federal fund to help cleanup uncontrolled or abandoned hazardous waste sites.

This includes any type of emergency release of contaminants into the environment.

== Emergency response and prevention ==
Environmental cleanup laws may contain requirements for identifying and responding to environmental emergencies. In such cases, laws may define when immediate response actions are required, or criteria by which a regulatory agency may make such a determination. Immediate response actions may be required, for example, when a release of a pollutant into the environment poses an immediate threat to human health or ecological values. Events such as oil spills and large-scale chemical releases often trigger emergency response actions.

== Environmental remediation ==
Environmental remediation is the process of physically removing, treating, or isolating pollutants in environmental media. Environmental cleanup laws may contain specific requisite remediation protocols, or may contain standards and processes by which a regulatory agency may determine an appropriate remedy.

== Regional and International Agencies and Organizations ==
Environmental cleanup laws are enforced and implemented through a complex and interconnected network of regional and international agencies, organizations, and regulatory frameworks across the globe. This page will provide a comprehensive overview of the regional and international agencies, organizations, and regulatory frameworks that govern environmental cleanup laws, highlighting their roles, responsibilities, and collaborative efforts to protect the global environment.

== North America ==
=== United States ===
The main federal agency responsible for addressing and administering environmental laws in the United States is the Environmental Protection Agency (EPA). In addition to responding to environmental crises, key responsibilities of the EPA include the administration of the Superfund program whose goal is managing solid and hazardous waste. The EPA also directs the Brownfields program to aid the redevelopment of contaminated properties and sites in the United States.

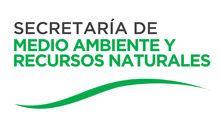
Logo of the Secretariat of Environment and Natural Resources

=== Mexico ===
The Secretariat of Environment and Natural Resources (SEMARNAT) is Mexico's primary federal environmental agency, similar to the EPA in the U.S. It is responsible for enforcing environmental laws and standards, including those related to air pollution, water pollution, and hazardous waste management. SEMARNAT regulates air pollution from both stationary and mobile sources, setting atmospheric air quality standards. They enforce the General Law for Prevention and Comprehensive Waste Management, which includes regulations for the storage, transportation, and disposal of hazardous waste. SEMARNAT also implements strategies to address climate change, including the enforcement of the General Law on Climate Change. Sustainable development practices are championed and industrial establishments are required to report their greenhouse gas emissions annually.

=== Canada ===
The leading federal department in Canada responsible for addressing a wide range of environmental issues, policy development and the enforcement of rules and regulations (ECCC Mandate). The duties of the Ministers of Environment and Climate Change, in addition to the department, focuses on holistic nature between economic-well-being and environmental sustainability by educating Canadians on the natural environment and the threat of human pollution to it. The department and its ministers implement their policies through programs and regulations such as: Pan-Canadian Framework on Clean Growth and Climate Change, Canadian Environmental Protection Act, 1999 (CEPA 1999), and the Federal Sustainable Development Act (PCFCGCC).

== South and Latin America ==
Latin America Network for Environmental Enforcement and Compliance (REDLAFICA) is an organization created by Colombia, Chile, Ecuador, and Peru to improve international cooperation on environmental crises and cleanup with Latin America. Since its establishment in 2013, the organization has expanded and now contains South American countries including Argentina, Brazil, Bolivia, Paraguay, and Uruguay. The recent addition of the Environmental Impact Assessment Systems Network (REDLASEIA) in 2021 combines official organizations from various South American countries, such as Argentina, Brazil, Chile, Colombia, Ecuador, Paraguay, Peru, and Uruguay. Similar to the aim of RELAFICA, REDLASEIA aims to embolden regional cooperation on responding to environmental crises.

== Europe ==
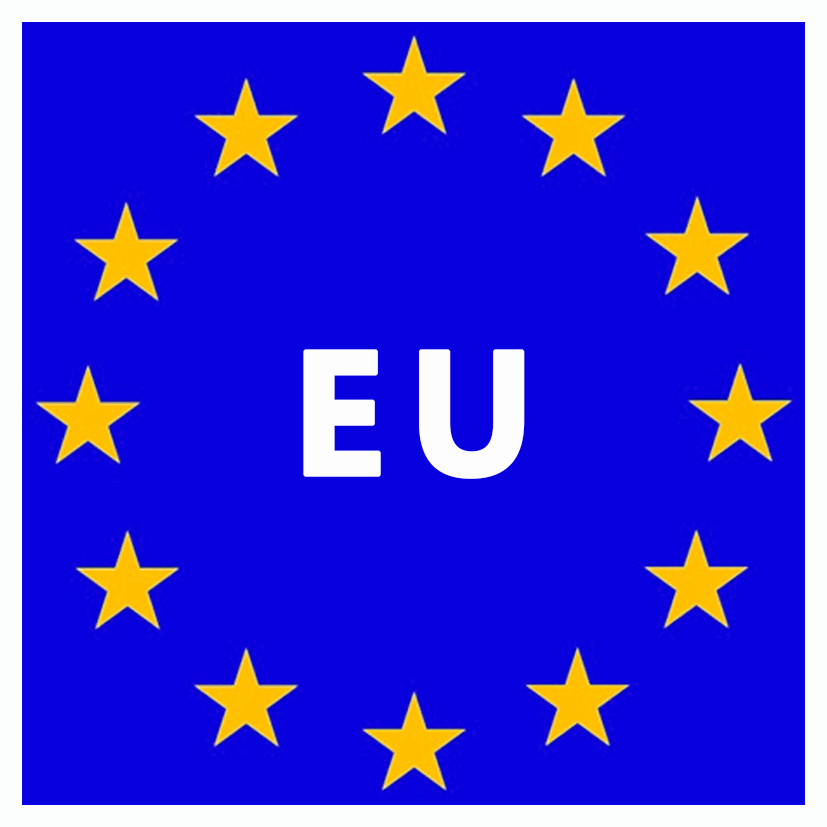
Sign of European Union

=== European Union Level ===
Most European Union member states have their own environmental agencies that work in conjunction with EU-level organizations. These organizations include: Germany's Federal Environment Agency (Umweltbundesamt), France's Ministry for the Ecological and Inclusive Transition, Spain's Ministry for the Ecological Transition and the Demographic Challenge (MITECO), and Italy's Ministry of the Environment and Energy Security. Outside of European-Union member countries national organizations, the European Commission is leading the development and implementation of environmental crisis cleanups and policy creation. The Commission plans to restore 20% of all degraded ecosystems within the EU by 2030, and all of the ecosystems by 2050 (CSDDD). In addition to the European Commission, the European Environment Agency (EEA) also provides oversight of environmental goals and provides independent information on ways they can be improved.

=== Non European Union Member European Countries ===
International organizations, such as the United Nations Environment Programme (UNEP), are the main actors in initiating international cooperation between EU and non-EU members on environmental issues. UNEP works in tandem with national agencies to provide policy analysis and recommendations on environmental issues such as environmental protection and restoration.

== African Union ==
Flag of the African Union

The African Union (AU) plays a key role in environmental cleanup and management efforts across its 55 member states. From the AU, the Department of Agriculture, Rural Development, Blue Economy and Sustainable Environment (ARBE) is in charge of aiding member states to develop and implement Multilateral Environmental Agreements (MEAs). In addition to the AU, UNEP is present within the region by supporting and promoting environmental cleanup laws and initiatives such as the Bamako Convention aimed at addressing hazardous waste within the region. Each country in the region has its own national environmental protection agency or ministry which enforces environmental cleanup efforts. They frequently work in tandem with official organizations like the AU and UNEP as well as NGOs such as EcoPeace Middle East which also focus on environmental issues in North Africa.

== Asia ==
Within Asia, there are several sub-regional organizations involved in environmental management. Among the intergovernmental organizations spanning the region include the Association of Southeast Asian Nations (ASEAN), South Asia Association for Regional Cooperation (SAARC), South Asian Cooperative Environment Programme (SACEP), and the Secretariat of the Pacific Regional Environment Programme (SPREP). On the national scale, national environmental agencies are typically responsible for developing and enforcing environmental laws and cleanup efforts. These agencies coordinate with other regional and international organizations such as the United Nations Environment Programme (UNEP) which supports environmental dialogues and conferences within the region as well.

== Middle East ==
Among the government agencies, Abu Dhabi's Environmental Agency (EAD) is the largest regional agency responsible for regulating, maintaining, and improving the quality of air, groundwater, and biodiversity in the emirate. The National Centre for Environment Compliance (NCEC) is in control of environmental permitting in Saudi Arabia. The Dubai Municipality Environmental Sustainability Department (DM-ESD) is committed to supporting environmental sectors and the development of sustainable practices in Dubai through the implementation of environmental policies and technical guidelines. NGOs, such as EcoPeace Middle East, have a significant role within the region as well with their continued focus on peacebuilding efforts aimed at promoting regional cooperation on environmental issues.
