= Water quality law =

Laws governing protection of water resources

Water quality laws govern the protection of water resources for human health and the environment. Water quality laws are legal standards or requirements governing water quality, that is, the concentrations of water pollutants in some regulated volume of water. Such standards are generally expressed as levels of a specific water pollutants (whether chemical, physical, biological, or radiological) that are deemed acceptable in the water volume, and are generally designed relative to the water's intended use - whether for human consumption, industrial or domestic use, recreation, or as aquatic habitat. Additionally, these laws provide regulations on the alteration of the chemical, physical, radiological, and biological characteristics of water resources. Regulatory efforts may include identifying and categorizing water pollutants, dictating acceptable pollutant concentrations in water resources, and limiting pollutant discharges from effluent sources. Regulatory areas include sewage treatment and disposal, industrial and agricultural waste water management, and control of surface runoff from construction sites and urban environments. Water quality laws provides the foundation for regulations in water standards, monitoring, required inspections and permits, and enforcement. These laws may be modified to meet current needs and priorities.

== Regulated waters ==
The Earth's hydrosphere is ubiquitous, fluid, and complex. Within the water cycle, physical water moves without regard to political boundaries between the Earth's atmosphere, surface, and subsurface, through both natural and human-made channels.

=== Regulated waters ===
Water quality laws define the portion of this complex system subject to regulatory control. Regulatory jurisdictions may be coterminous with political boundaries (e.g., certain treaty responsibilities may apply to water pollution in all of Earth's international waters). Other laws may apply only to a subset of waters within a political boundary (e.g., a national law that applies only to navigable surface waters), or to a special class of water (e.g., drinking water resources).

=== Non-regulated waters ===
Areas not covered by regulated waters. Additionally, cross-jurisdictional waters may be subject to cross-jurisdictional agreements. Even within jurisdictions, complexities may arise where water flows between subsurface and surface, or saturates land without permanently inundating it (wetlands).

== Water pollutant classification ==
Water quality laws identify the substances and energies which qualify as "water pollution" for purposes of further control. From a regulatory perspective, this requires defining the class(es) of materials that qualify as pollutants, and the activities that transform a material into a pollutant. Regulatory administrations may also use definitions to reflect policy decisions, excluding certain classes of materials from the definition of water pollution that would otherwise be considered to constitute water pollution.

For example, the United States Clean Water Act (CWA) defines "pollution" (i.e., water pollution) very broadly to include any and all "man-made or man-induced alteration of the chemical, physical, biological, and radiological integrity of water." However, the Act defines "pollutants" subject to its control more specifically, as "dredged spoil, solid waste, incinerator residue, filter backwash, sewage, garbage, sewage sludge, munitions, chemical wastes, biological materials, radioactive materials [with certain exceptions], heat, wrecked or discarded equipment, rock, sand, cellar dirt and industrial, municipal, and agricultural waste discharged into water." This definition begins to define both the classes or types of materials (e.g., solid waste) and energies (e.g., heat) that may constitute water pollution, and indicates the moment at which otherwise useful materials may be transformed into pollution for regulatory purposes: when they are "discharged into water," defined elsewhere as "addition" of the material to regulated waters. The CWA definition is excluded for sewage discharged from certain classes of vessels, meaning that a common and important class of water pollution is, by definition, not considered a pollutant for purposes of the United States' primary water quality law. (See Regulation of ship pollution in the United States.) Although thermal pollution is subject to regulation under the CWA, definitional questions have resulted in litigation, including whether even water itself may qualify as a "pollutant" (e.g., adding warm water to a stream). The United States Supreme Court addressed these issues in Los Angeles County Flood Control District v. Natural Resources Defense Council, Inc. (2013).

== Water quality standards ==
=== Ambient water quality standards ===
Determining appropriate water quality standards requires up-to-date scientific data on the health or environmental effects of the pollutant under review through water quality criteria. Water quality criteria includes set indicators that determine if water is no longer safe for human or wildlife health based on scientific data. Scientific data includes measurable factors such as temperature, dissolved oxygen, nutrients, toxic chemicals, pollutants, heavy metals, organic micro pollutants, radioactive substances, and sediments. Water quality criteria may require periodic or continuous monitoring of the water body. Based on the criteria, regulatory decisions on water quality standards may change to also incorporate political considerations, such as the economic costs and benefits of compliance.

As an example, the United States employs water quality standards as part of its regulation of surface water quality under the CWA. The national Water Quality Standards (WQS) Program begins with U.S. states designating intended uses (e.g., recreation, drinking water, natural habitat) for a surface water bodies, after which they develop science-based water quality criteria. The criteria include numeric pollutant concentration limits, narrative goals (e.g., free from algae blooms), and narrative biological criteria (i.e., the aquatic life that should be able to live in the waterbody). If the water body fails the existing WQS criteria, the state develops a Total Maximum Daily Load (TMDL) for pollutants of concern. Human activity impacting water quality will then be controlled via other regulatory means in order to achieve the TMDL targets.

=== Technology-based standards ===
The US Clean Water Act also requires implementation of technology-based standards, which are developed for individual discharger categories based on the performance of treatment technologies, rather than location-based standards of water bodies. These standards have been developed for both industrial dischargers and municipal sewage treatment plants:

- For industrial categories, EPA publishes Effluent guidelines for existing sources, as well as New Source Performance Standards.
- For sewage treatment plants, the Secondary Treatment Regulation is the national standard.

These standards provide a basic minimum level of treatment requirements across a category nationwide. If more stringent controls are needed for a particular water body, water quality-based effluent limitations are implemented.

=== Effluent limitations ===
In the US, point sources of pollution are required to obtain discharge permits under the National Pollutant Discharge Elimination System (NPDES). Effluent limitations are legal requirements that are incorporated into the various permits. The limitations describe the permissible amount of specific water pollutants that may be released from specific sources. Numerous methods exist for determining appropriate limitations.

=== Drinking water standards ===
Water designated for human consumption as drinking water may be subject to specific drinking water quality standards.

In the United States, for example, such standards have been developed by EPA under the Safe Drinking Water Act, are mandatory for public water systems, and are enforced via a comprehensive monitoring and correction program. (Private wells are not regulated at the federal level. Some state and local governments have issued standards for private wells.)

== Dumping bans ==
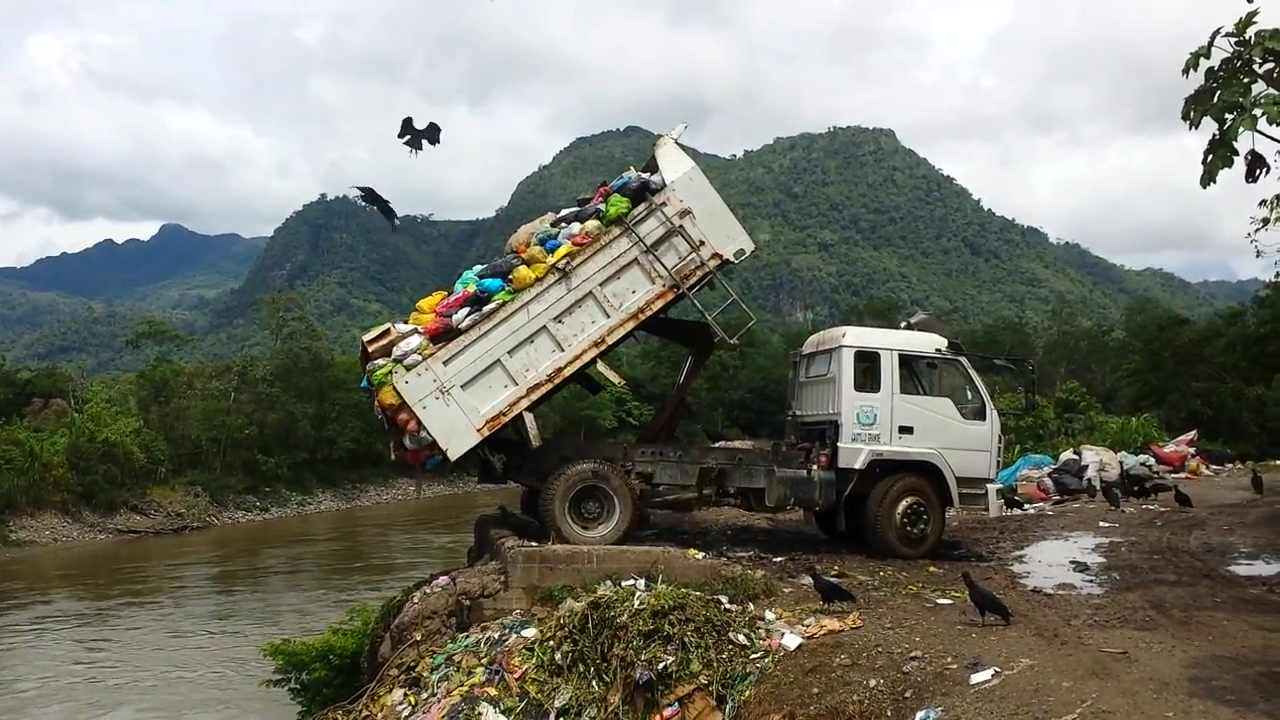
Toxic Medical Waste being dumped into the Huallaga River in Peru

Within a single country's regulated waters, administrations may have legal authority to hold a responsible party accountable. Once pollution drifts into another country's regulated waters and affects their water quality, whether it be intentional or accidental discharge of oil, release of hazardous or toxic substances, or the discard of waste into the marine environment, transboundary pollution has taken place. Transboundary pollution is addressed through international environmental agreements that may be in the form of bi-lateral, tri-lateral, or multilateral treaties. The Marine Protection, Research, and Sanctuaries Act (MPRSA) was passed by Congress in order to prevent dumping from occurring in marine environments. The main purpose of this bill is to prevent ships and vehicles from and coming to the United States from dumping hazardous materials in U.S territories. It also prohibits toxic material from leaving the United States with the purpose of being dumped and polluting international waters.

== Permitting, data collection, and access ==
=== Permitting ===
The permission to discharge pollutants into surface water under specific conditions.

For example, several approaches are used in the United States. The Clean Water Act requires the United States Environmental Protection Agency (EPA) to develop effluent guidelines—national industry-specific effluent limitations based on the performance of existing control technologies. These limits set a basic national discharge standard for an industrial category, typically using a "best available technology economically achievable" (BAT) standard for existing facilities, and a "best available demonstrated control technology" standard for new facilities. EPA has also published technology-based standards for publicly owned treatment works (municipal sewage treatment plants). If the standard for a particular industrial or municipal facility is not sufficiently protective of the receiving water body, then water quality standards may be employed to develop more stringent limitations for the facility. The industrial and municipal standards are implemented in discharge permits issued by state agencies and EPA, under the National Pollutant Discharge Elimination System (NPDES). All point sources of pollution obtain permits prior to discharge. Nonpoint sources are not subject to the permit program.

== Around the world ==
=== International law ===
There are two major nongovernmental organizations that have made monumental advancements in improving the quality of water internationally. The International Law Association (ILA) and the Institute of International Law (IIL) worked with the United Nations to develop the Helsinki and Berlin Rules .

Marine and ship pollution are serious threats to the world's oceans.

The International Maritime Organization developed regulations governing maritime pollution MARPOL 73/78 from ships. The World Health Organization provides a global overview of water quality, areas of risk, recommendations for future Guidelines for DrinkingWater Quality (GDWQ).

=== Canada ===
- Water Governance

=== United States ===
The Clean Water Act is the primary federal law in the United States governing water pollution, and is administered by EPA and state environmental agencies.

Groundwater is protected at the federal level principally through:

- The Resource Conservation and Recovery Act, through regulation of the disposal of municipal solid waste and hazardous waste.
- The Safe Drinking Water Act (SDWA), through regulation of injection wells.
- The Comprehensive Environmental Response, Compensation, and Liability Act (CERCLA) or Superfund, through regulation in the clean-up of hazardous waste.
- The Federal Insecticide, Fungicide, and Rodenticide Act (FIFRA), through regulation of pesticides.
- The Toxic Substances Control Act (TSCA), through regulation of toxic substances.

The SDWA governs public water systems in the United States, and is administered by EPA and states. Bottled water is regulated by the Food and Drug Administration (FDA) under the Federal Food, Drug, and Cosmetic Act#Bottled water.
