= Pierre Messmer =

83rd Prime Minister of France

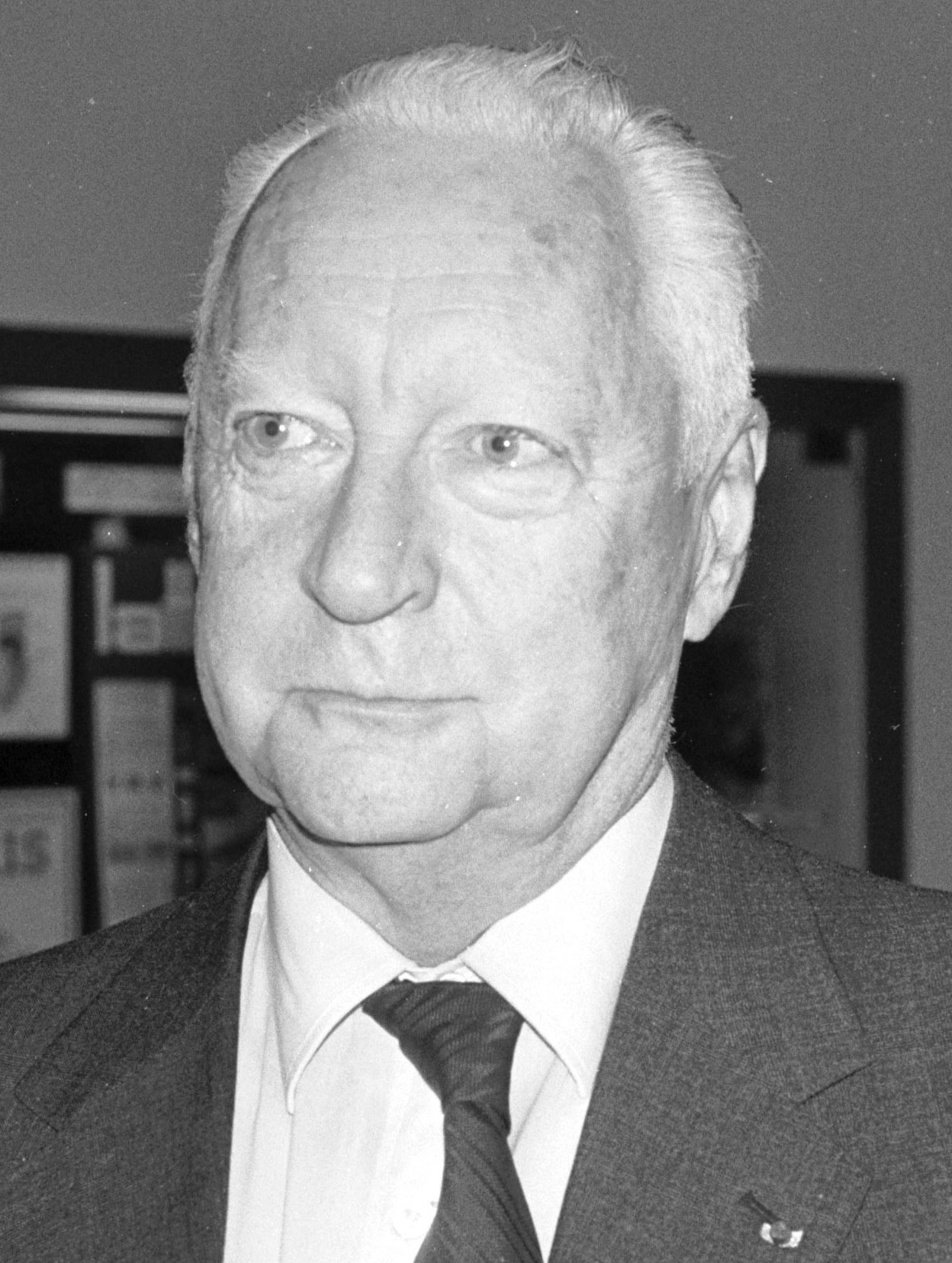
- Messmer in 1988

Prime Minister of France
- In office 5 July 1972 – 27 May 1974
- President: Georges Pompidou; Alain Poher (Acting)
- Preceded by: Jacques Chaban-Delmas
- Succeeded by: Jacques Chirac

Governor of the Ivory Coast Territory
- In office 19 February 1954 – 18 February 1956
- Preceded by: Camille-Victor Bailly
- Succeeded by: Pierre-Auguste-Michel-Marie Lami

Minister of the Armed Forces
- In office 5 February 1960 – 22 June 1969
- Prime Minister: Michel Debré; Georges Pompidou; Maurice Couve de Murville
- Preceded by: Pierre Guillaumat
- Succeeded by: Michel Debré

Personal details
- Born: Pierre Joseph Auguste Messmer; 20 March 1916 Vincennes, Seine (now Val-de-Marne), France
- Died: 29 August 2007 (aged 91) Paris, France
- Party: UDR
- Occupation: Civil servant

Pierre Joseph Auguste Messmer (French: [pjɛʁ mɛsmɛʁ]; 20 March 1916 – 29 August 2007) was a French Gaullist politician. He served as Minister of Armies under Charles de Gaulle from 1960 to 1969 – the longest serving since Étienne François, duc de Choiseul under Louis XV – and then as Prime Minister under Georges Pompidou from 1972 to 1974. A member of the French Foreign Legion, he was considered one of the historical Gaullists, and died aged 91 in the military hospital of the Val-de-Grâce in August 2007. He was elected a member of the Académie française in 1999; his seat was taken over by Simone Veil.

== Early career ==
Pierre Joseph Auguste Messmer was born in Vincennes in 1916. He graduated in 1936 in the language school ENLOV and the following year at the École nationale de la France d'outre-mer (National School of Oversea France).

He then became a senior civil servant in the colonial administration and became a Doctor of Laws in 1939. In the outbreak of World War II, he was sous-lieutenant of the 12th regiment of Senegalese tirailleurs, and refused France's capitulation after the defeat. He then hijacked in Marseille an Italian cargo ship (the Capo Olmo), along with his friend Jean Simon (a future French General), and sailed first to Gibraltar, then London and engaged himself in the Free French Forces as a member of the 13th Demi-Brigade of the French Foreign Legion.

Messmer then participated to the campaign in Eritrea, in Syria, in Libya, participating to the Battle of Bir Hakeim, and in the Tunisia campaign. He also fought at the Battle of El Alamein in Egypt. He joined in London General Koenig's military staff and participated in the landings in Normandy in August 1944 and the Liberation of Paris.

Named Compagnon de la Libération in 1941, he received the Croix de guerre (War Cross) with six citations after the Liberation, as well as the medal of the Resistance.

== After World War II ==
After World War II, he returned to the colonies and was a prisoner of war of the Vietminh, during two months in 1945, after the outbreak of the First Indochina War. He was named the following year general secretary of the interministerial committee for Indochina and then head of staff of the high commissary of the Republic.

=== Colonial administrator in Africa ===
Messmer began his high-level African service as governor of Mauritania from 1952 to 1954, and then served as governor of Ivory Coast from 1954 to 1956, when he briefly returned to Paris in the staff of Gaston Defferre, Minister of Overseas Territories who enacted the Defferre Act granting to colonial territories internal autonomy, a first step towards independence.

That same year, Messmer was nominated as governor general of Cameroun, where a civil war had started the preceding year following the outlawing of the independentist Union of the Peoples of Cameroon (UPC) in July 1955. He initiated a decolonization process and imported the counter-revolutionary warfare methods theorized in Indochina and implemented during the Algerian War (1954–62). Visiting de Gaulle in Paris, he was implicitly granted permission for his change of policies in Cameroon, which exchanged repression for negotiations with the UPC.

A "Pacification Zone" – the ZOPAC (Zone de pacification du Cameroon) was created on 9 December 1957, englobing 7,000 square km controlled by seven infantry regiments. Furthermore, a civilian-military intelligence apparatus was created, combining colonial and local staff, assisted by a civilian militia. Mao Zedong's people's war was reversed in an attempt to separate the civilian population from the guerrilla. In that aim, the local population was rounded up in guarded villages located on the main roads that were controlled by the French Army.

Messmer served as high commissioner of French Equatorial Africa from January 1958 to July 1958, and as high commissioner of French West Africa from 1958 to 1959.

=== Minister of Armies (1959–1969) ===
From 1959 to 1969, under Charles de Gaulle's presidency and in the turmoil of the Algerian War, he was Minister of Armies. He was confronted with the 1961 Generals' Putsch, reorganised the French Army and adapted it to the nuclear era.

In 1960, Messmer visited Lisbon and expressed lament for the United Nations resolutions against colonialism and approved of the Estado Novo regime's hardline stance against decolonisation on the grounds that Portugal represented the last vestige of white Western civilisation on the African continent.

Messmer gave permission for former Algerian War veterans to fight in Katanga against the newly independent Congo and United Nations peacekeeping forces. He confided to Roger Trinquier that it was de Gaulle's ambition to replace the Belgians and control a reunited Congo from Élisabethville.

Along with the Minister of Research, Gaston Palewski, Messmer was present at the Béryl nuclear test in Algeria, on 1 May 1962 during which an accident occurred. Officials, soldiers, and Algerian workers escaped as they could, often without wearing any protection. Palewski died in 1984 of leukemia, which he always has attributed to the Beryl incident, and Messmer always remained close-mouthed on the affair.

De Gaulle said that along with Maurice Couve de Murville, Messmer was "one of his two arms. " In May 68, he advised de Gaulle against the use of the military.

Messmer became a personality of the Gaullist Party and was elected deputy in 1968, representing Moselle département. A member of the conservative wing of the Gaullist movement, he criticised the "New Society" plan of Prime Minister Jacques Chaban-Delmas and thus won the trust of Georges Pompidou, elected President in 1969. He quit the government after de Gaulle's resignation and founded the association Présence du gaullisme (Presence of Gaullism).

== From the 1970s to the 2000s ==
He occupied cabinet positions again in the 1970s, serving first as Minister of state charged of the Overseas Territories in 1971, then as Prime Minister from July 1972 to May 1974.

=== Messmer's cabinet (July 1972 – May 1974) ===
He succeeded in this function to Jacques Chaban-Delmas, who had adopted a parliamentary reading of the Constitution, which Messmer opposed in his investiture speech. Messmer had been chosen by Pompidou as a guarant of his fidelity to de Gaulle, and his cabinet included personalities close to Pompidou, such as Jacques Chirac, named Minister of Agriculture.

Due to President Georges Pompidou's illness, he dealt with the everyday administration of the country and adopted a conservative stance opposed to Chaban-Delmas' previous policies. Henceforth, he stopped the liberalization of the ORTF media governmental organization, naming as its CEO Arthur Conte, a personal friend of Pompidou.

Under his government, the Union des Démocrates pour la République (UDR) presidential majority negotiated with Valéry Giscard d'Estaing's Independent Republicans an electoral alliance, which enabled it to win the 1973 elections despite the left-wing union realized with the 1972 Common Program. Messmer's second cabinet excluded several Gaullists, among whom Michel Debré, while he named several Independent Republicans members, such as Michel Poniatowski, close to Giscard, himself named Minister of Economy and Finances. A Ministry of Information was also re-created and put under the authority of an ultra-conservative, Philippe Malaud. In June 1974, he initiated the construction of 13 nuclear plants in order to confront the "choc pétrolier" (oil crisis).

In 1974, when Pompidou died, those close to Messmer encouraged him to run for president. He accepted at the condition of Chaban-Delmas, Valéry Giscard d'Estaing and Edgar Faure's withdrawals. Faure accepted, as well as Giscard on the condition that Chaban-Delmas also withdrew himself. However, Chaban-Delmas, despite the Canard enchaîné's campaign against him, maintained himself, leading Messmer to withdraw his candidacy. Finally, Valéry Giscard d'Estaing, a conservative rival of the Gaullists, was elected. He served as prime minister for another few weeks after Pompidou's death, ending his term after the presidential elections. Jacques Chirac replaced him on 29 May 1974. After the election of Giscard, he never held again ministerial offices, and became one of the historical voices of Gaullism.

=== Later career and death ===
Messmer remained a Member of Parliament for the Moselle department until 1988, and served as President of the Lorraine regional assembly from 1968 to 1992. He was mayor of the town of Sarrebourg from 1971 to 1989. Messmer was also president of the Rally for the Republic (RPR) parliamentary group during the first cohabitation (1986–1988), under Jacques Chirac's government. In 1997 he testified as a witness during the trial of Maurice Papon, charged of crimes against humanity committed under the Vichy regime, and declared: "The time has come when the Frenchmen could stop hating themselves and begin to grant pardon to themselves". Along with some other former Resistants, he demanded Papon's pardon in 2001.

He died in 2007 aged 91, just four days after fellow Prime Minister Raymond Barre. He was the last surviving major French Politician to have been a member of the Free French forces.

== Political career ==
Governmental functions

- Prime Minister: 1972–1974
- Minister of State, Minister of Departments and Overseas Territories: 1971–1972
- Minister of Armies: 1960–1969

Electoral mandates

National Assembly

- Member of the National Assembly of France for Moselle: 1969–1971, 1974–1988

Regional Council

- President of the Regional Council of Lorraine: 1978–1979
- Regional councillor of Lorraine: 1968–1992

General Council

- General councillor of Moselle: 1970–1982

Municipal Council

- Mayor of Sarrebourg: 1971–1989
- Municipal councillor of Sarrebourg: 1971–1989

== Honours ==
An important figure of the French Resistance during World War II, Pierre Messmer was a member of the Ordre de la Libération, and the recipient of numerous decorations including the highest rank of the Légion d'honneur. In 2006, he was named Chancellier de l'Ordre de la Libération after the death of General Alain de Boissieu. He was also an officer of the American Legion.

In 1992 he became president of the Institut Charles de Gaulle and, in 1995, of the Fondation Charles de Gaulle.

He also became elected as a member of the Académie française (the French language academy) in 1999, replacing a Gaullist comrade, Maurice Schumann. He was also a member of the French Academy of Moral and Political Sciences since 1988, and, since 1976, of the Académie des sciences d'outre-mer (Academy of Sciences of Overseas Territories). He was named perpetual secretary of the Academy of Moral and Political Sciences in 1995. He was also chancellor of the Institut de France (1998–2005) before becoming honorary chancellor.

In October 2001, Messmer succeeded to the General Jean Simon as President of the Fondation de la France libre (Foundation of Free France).

=== National ===
- France:
  - Grand Cross of the National Order of the Legion of Honour (1993)
  - Grand Officer of the National Order of the Legion of Honour (1974)
  - Order of Liberation
  - Croix de guerre 1939-1945
  - Resistance Medal
  - Escapees' Medal
  - Colonial Medal
  - 1939–1945 Commemorative war medal (France)
  - Combatant's Cross

=== Foreign ===
- Indonesia:
  - Star of the Republic of Indonesia, 2nd Class (1972)

== Messmer's First Ministry, 5 July 1972 – 2 April 1973 ==
- Pierre Messmer – Prime Minister
- Maurice Schumann – Minister of Foreign Affairs
- Michel Debré – Minister of National Defense
- Raymond Marcellin – Minister of the Interior
- Valéry Giscard d'Estaing – Minister of Economy and Finance
- Jean Charbonnel – Minister of Industrial and Scientific Development
- Joseph Fontanet – Minister of National Education, Labour, Employment, and Population
- René Pleven – Minister of Justice
- André Bord – Minister of Veterans
- Jacques Duhamel – Minister of Cultural Affairs
- Jacques Chirac – Minister of Agriculture and Rural Development
- Olivier Guichard – Minister of Housing, Tourism, Equipment, and Regional Planning
- Robert Galley – Minister of Transport
- Jean Foyer – Minister of Public Health
- Hubert Germain – Minister of Posts and Telecommunications
- Yvon Bourges – Minister of Commerce
- Roger Frey – Minister of Administrative Reforms
- Edgar Faure – Minister of Social Affairs

Changes

- 15 March 1973 – André Bettencourt succeeds Schumann as interim Minister of Foreign Affairs.
- 16 March 1973 – Pierre Messmer succeeds Pleven as interim Minister of Justice.

== Messmer's Second Ministry, 6 April 1973 – 1 March 1974 ==
- Pierre Messmer – Prime Minister
- Michel Jobert – Minister of Foreign Affairs
- Robert Galley – Minister of Armies
- Raymond Marcellin – Minister of the Interior
- Valéry Giscard d'Estaing – Minister of Economy and Finance
- Jean Charbonnel – Minister of Industrial and Scientific Development
- Georges Gorse – Minister of Labour, Employment, and Population
- Jean Taittinger – Minister of Justice
- Joseph Fontanet – Minister of National Education
- André Bord – Minister of Veterans and War Victims
- Maurice Druon – Minister of Cultural Affairs
- Jacques Chirac – Minister of Agriculture and Rural Development
- Robert Poujade – Minister of Natural Protection and Environment
- Bernard Stasi – Minister of Overseas Departments and Territories
- Olivier Guichard – Minister of Housing, Tourism, Regional Planning, and Equipment
- Yves Guéna – Minister of Transport
- Joseph Comiti – Minister of Relations with Parliament
- Michel Poniatowski – Minister of Public Health
- Hubert Germain – Minister of Posts and Telecommunications
- Philippe Malaud – Minister of Information
- Jean Royer – Minister of Commerce and Craft Industry
- Alain Peyrefitte – Minister of Administrative Reforms

Changes

- 23 October 1973 – Philippe Malaud becomes Minister of Civil Service. Jean-Philippe Lecat succeeds Malaud as Minister of Information

== Messmer's Third Ministry, 1 March – 28 May 1974 ==
- Pierre Messmer – Prime Minister
- Michel Jobert – Minister of Foreign Affairs
- Robert Galley – Minister of Armies
- Jacques Chirac – Minister of the Interior
- Valéry Giscard d'Estaing – Minister of Economy and Finance
- Yves Guéna – Minister of Industry, Commerce, and Craft Industry
- Georges Gorse – Minister of Labour, Employment, and Population
- Jean Taittinger – Minister of Justice
- Joseph Fontanet – Minister of National Education
- Alain Peyrefitte – Minister of Cultural Affairs and Environment
- Raymond Marcellin – Minister of Agriculture and Rural Development
- Olivier Guichard – Minister of Regional Planning and Equipment
- Hubert Germain – Minister of Relations with Parliament
- Michel Poniatowski – Minister of Public Health
- Jean Royer – Minister of Posts and Telecommunications
- Jean-Philippe Lecat – Minister of Information

Changes

- 11 April 1974 – Hubert Germain succeeds Royer as interim Minister of Posts and Telecommunications.

== Bibliography ==
- 1939 Le Régime administratif des emprunts coloniaux. Thesis for his Doctorate of Laws (Librairie juridique et administrative)
- 1977 Le Service militaire. Débat avec Jean-Pierre Chevènement (Balland)
- 1985 Les Écrits militaires du général de Gaulle, in collaboration with Professor Alain Larcan (PUF)
- 1992 Après tant de batailles, Mémoires (Albin Michel)
- 1998 Les Blancs s’en vont. Récits de décolonisation (Albin Michel)
- 2002 La Patrouille perdue (Albin Michel)
- 2003 Ma part de France (Xavier de Guibert)

== See also ==
- Politics of France
- France in the 20th century

Political offices
Preceded by Pierre Guillaumat	Minister of the Armies; 1960–1969	Succeeded by Michel Debré
Preceded by Joël Le Theule	Minister of the Overseas; 1971–1972	Succeeded by Bernard Stasi
Preceded by Jacques Chaban-Delmas	Prime Minister of France; 1972–1974	Succeeded by Jacques Chirac
