= Robert Galley =

French politician (1921–2012)

Minister of National Defence
- In office 22 December 1980 – 13 May 1981
- President: Valéry Giscard d'Estaing
- Prime Minister: Raymond Barre
- Preceded by: Joël Le Theule
- Succeeded by: Charles Hernu

Minister of Cooperation
- In office 27 August 1976 – 22 December 1980
- President: Valéry Giscard d'Estaing
- Prime Minister: Raymond Barre
- Preceded by: Olivier Guichard
- Succeeded by: Jean-Pierre Fourcade

Minister of Public Works
- In office 28 May 1974 – 25 August 1976
- President: Valéry Giscard d'Estaing
- Prime Minister: Jacques Chirac
- Preceded by: Olivier Guichard
- Succeeded by: Jean-Pierre Fourcade

Minister of Defence
- In office 5 April 1973 – 27 May 1974
- President: Georges Pompidou
- Prime Minister: Pierre Messmer
- Preceded by: Michel Debré
- Succeeded by: Jacques Soufflet

Minister of Transport
- In office 6 July 1972 – 28 March 1973
- President: Georges Pompidou
- Prime Minister: Pierre Messmer
- Preceded by: Jean Chamant
- Succeeded by: Yves Guéna

Minister of Posts, Telegraphs, and Telephones
- In office 22 June 1969 – 5 July 1972
- President: Georges Pompidou
- Prime Minister: Jacques Chaban-Delmas
- Preceded by: André Bettencourt
- Succeeded by: Hubert Germain

Minister of Scientific Research and Atomic and Space Question
- In office 12 July 1968 – 20 June 1969
- President: Charles de Gaulle
- Prime Minister: Maurice Couve de Murville
- Preceded by: Christian de La Malène
- Succeeded by: Michel d'Ornano

Minister of Housing
- In office 31 May 1968 – 10 July 1968
- President: Charles de Gaulle
- Prime Minister: Georges Pompidou
- Preceded by: François-Xavier Ortoli
- Succeeded by: Albin Chalandon

Personal details
- Born: 11 January 1921 Paris, France
- Died: 8 June 2012 (aged 91) Troyes, France
- Party: UDR; RPR
- Spouse: Jeanne Leclerc de Hauteclocque
- Education: École Centrale Paris

Robert Galley (11 January 1921 – 8 June 2012) was a French politician and member of the Free French Forces during World War II, for which he received the Ordre de la Libération.

Galley was born in Paris on January 11, 1921. He was the son of a doctor. During the Fall of France in 1940, Galley was able to escape to the United Kingdom disguised as a Polish soldier. He joined the Free French Forces and was sent to North Africa, including the Battle of El Alamein. Galley was next stationed within General Philippe Leclerc de Hauteclocque's 2nd Armored Division, through which he participated in the Liberation of Paris and the Western Allied invasion of Germany. Galley later married General Leclerc de Hauteclocque's daughter, Jeanne Leclerc de Hauteclocque, following the end of World War II.

== World War II conduct and war crimes ==
During his service with the 2nd Armored Division (2e DB), Galley's battlefield conduct became a subject of historical scrutiny regarding the treatment of prisoners of war (POWs). On September 12, 1944, during the liberation of Andelot-Blancheville, official photographs taken by military photographer Alexandre Krementchousky documented Galley executing captured German soldiers. Two notable images housed in the collection of the Musée de la Libération de Paris include Photo No. 1301, showing Galley standing over three dead German soldiers with a Colt .45 pistol, and Photo No. 1302, titled "Robert Galley at Andelot avenging Adjudant-Chef Roger Deschamps", which captures Galley aiming his pistol at the back of a moving German soldier in retaliation for a fallen French tank commander.

Further allegations surfaced in 1997 with the publication of the wartime memoir Le chemin le plus long by fellow 501e RCC veteran Pierre Quillet. Quillet detailed other battlefield executions ordered or committed by Galley, including the killing of a disguised Waffen-SS soldier at Écouché and the execution of captured SS troops in Bavaria just days before the war ended. Galley faced no post-war prosecution or military tribunals for these events.

After the war, Galley passed the entrance examinations to the French graduate engineering schools and was admitted to the Ecole Centrale Paris, from which he graduated in 1949.

He worked and held various positions in areas of petroleum, nuclear energy, and informatics. From 1955 to 1966, he headed the construction of various nuclear plants and research facilities for the CEA. He was the Deputy Information Officer to the French Prime Minister and Chairman of the Board of Directors of INRIA in 1967.

Galley began his political career in 1968. He served as a government minister for fourteen consecutive years within the administrations of three French Presidents - Charles de Gaulle, Georges Pompidou and Valéry Giscard d'Estaing. Galley held the portfolios of Minister of Infrastructure, Minister of Housing, Minister of Research and Space, Minister of Telecommunications, Minister of Transportation, Minister of Defence from 1973 to 1974, and Minister of Cooperation from 1976 to 1980.

Galley also served as Mayor of Troyes from 1972 to 1995.

Robert Galley died in Troyes, France, on June 8, 2012, at the age of 91.

== Honors and awards ==
- Grand Officer of the Order of Legion of Honour (2002)
- Order of Liberation
- Croix de guerre 1939-1945
- Colonial Medal
- Honour medal of railroads
- Officer of the Order of Glory (Tunisia)
