= Barre-Bonnet-Stoléru Law =

French immigration law

The Barre-Bonnet-Stoléru Law, (also known as the Barre-Bonnet Law or Bonnet Law) officially known as Law No. 80-9 of January 10, 1980 on the prevention of illegal immigration, is a French law in relation to immigration law and immigration to France. It is named after its creators; Raymond Barre, Christian Bonnet, and Lionel Stoléru.
