= Jean-Philippe Lecat =

French politician (1935–2011)

French Minister of Culture
- In office 1978–1981
- President: Valéry Giscard d'Estaing
- Prime Minister: Raymond Barre
- Preceded by: Michel d'Ornano
- Succeeded by: Michel d'Ornano

Government spokespeople of France
- In office 1972–1973
- President: Georges Pompidou
- Prime Minister: Jacques Chaban-Delmas; Pierre Messmer
- Preceded by: Léo Hamon
- Succeeded by: André Rossi

Personal details
- Born: 29 July 1935 Dijon, France
- Died: 26 March 2011 (aged 75) France
- Party: RPR
- Education: Sciences Po, ÉNA

Jean-Philippe Lecat (French: [ʒɑ̃ filip ləka]; 29 July 1935 – 26 March 2011) was a French politician. He graduated from the École nationale d'administration in 1963. Between 1968 and 1978, he was a member of the Union of Democrats for the Republic and between 1978 and 1981, he was a member of the Rally for the Republic.

Between 1972 and 1973, he was the spokesman of the French government. From 1973 until 1974, he was Minister of Information. Finally, he was between 1978 and 1981, Minister of Culture.
