= Jacques Duhamel =

French politician

- Jacques Duhamel in 1969

Minister of Culture
- In office January 7, 1971 – March 28, 1973
- Prime Minister: Jacques Chaban-Delmas; Pierre Messmer
- Preceded by: André Bettencourt (interim)
- Succeeded by: Maurice Druon

Minister of Agriculture
- In office June 22, 1969 – January 7, 1971
- Prime Minister: Jacques Chaban-Delmas
- Preceded by: Robert Boulin
- Succeeded by: Michel Cointat

Personal details
- Born: 24 September 1924 Paris, France
- Died: 8 July 1977 (aged 52) Paris, France
- Party: Centre Democracy and Progress
- Spouse: Colette Rousselot
- Children: Jérôme Duhamel; Olivier Duhamel; Stéphane Duhamel; Gilles Duhamel
- Education: Sciences Po; École nationale d'administration
- Occupation: Politician

Jacques Duhamel (September 24, 1924 – July 8, 1977) was a French Resistance fighter and politician.

He was Minister of Agriculture from 1969 to 1971 and Minister of Culture from 1971 to 1973.

== Early years ==
Jacques Duhamel was born in Paris in 1924. A young French Resistance fighter, he was incarcerated in Fresnes Prison in 1943. After the Liberation of France, he completed his Licence de droit and was admitted at École nationale d'administration, from which he graduated in 1947.

== Professional activities ==
During his tenure as Minister of Culture, he worked on integrating cultural initiatives into daily life, emphasizing education, audiovisual development, and urban aesthetics. He also implemented reforms to support decentralized cultural organizations and promoted art in public buildings.

In addition to his ministerial roles, Duhamel was a Member of Parliament representing Jura and the mayor of Dole. Despite battling a long illness, he remained active in public life until his death in 1977 at the age of 52.

Political offices
Preceded by Robert Boulin	Minister of Agriculture; 1969–1971	Succeeded by Michel Cointat
