= Jacques Chaban-Delmas =

82nd Prime Minister of France

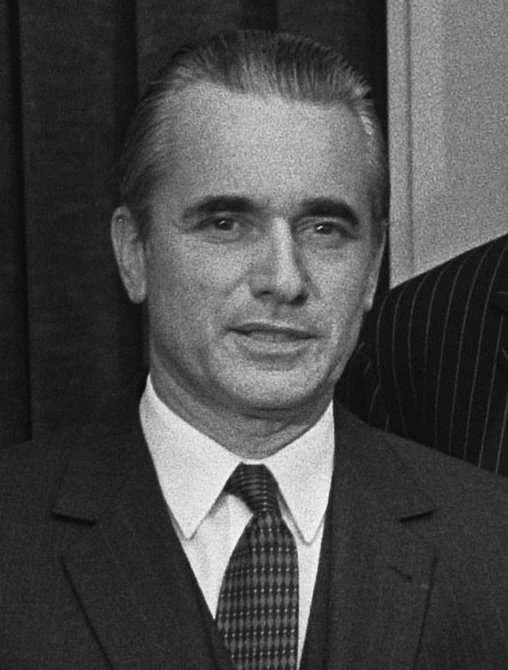
- Chaban-Delmas in 1969

Prime Minister of France
- In office 20 June 1969 – 5 July 1972
- President: Georges Pompidou
- Preceded by: Maurice Couve de Murville
- Succeeded by: Pierre Messmer

President of the National Assembly
- In office 2 April 1986 – 23 June 1988
- Preceded by: Louis Mermaz
- Succeeded by: Laurent Fabius
- In office 3 April 1978 – 2 July 1981
- Preceded by: Edgar Faure
- Succeeded by: Louis Mermaz
- In office 9 December 1959 – 24 June 1969
- Preceded by: André Le Troquer
- Succeeded by: Achille Peretti

Mayor of Bordeaux
- In office 19 October 1947 – 19 June 1995
- Preceded by: Jean-Fernand Audeguil
- Succeeded by: Alain Juppé

Personal details
- Born: Jacques Michel Pierre Delmas; 7 March 1915 Paris, France
- Died: 10 November 2000 (aged 85) Paris, France
- Party: Rally for the Republic (1976–2000)
- Other political affiliations: Radical Party (1940–1947); Rally of the French People (1947–1955); National Centre of Social Republicans (1955–1958); Union for the New Republic (1958–1968); Union of Democrats for the Republic (1968–1976)
- Education: Sciences Po
- Occupation: Civil Servant

Jacques Chaban-Delmas (French: [ʒak ʃabɑ̃ dɛlmas]; 7 March 1915 – 10 November 2000) was a French Gaullist politician. He served as Prime Minister under Georges Pompidou from 1969 to 1972. He was the Mayor of Bordeaux from 1947 to 1995 and a deputy for the Gironde département between 1946 and 1997.

== Biography ==
Jacques Chaban-Delmas was born Jacques Michel Pierre Delmas in Paris. He studied at the Lycée Lakanal in Sceaux, before attending the École Libre des Sciences Politiques ("Sciences Po"). In the resistance underground, his final nom de guerre was Chaban; after World War II, he formally changed his name to Chaban-Delmas. As a general of brigade in the resistance, he took part in the Parisian insurrection of August 1944, with general de Gaulle. He was the youngest French general since François Séverin Marceau-Desgraviers, during the First French Empire.

A member of the Radical Party, he finally joined the Gaullist Rally of the French People (RPF), which opposed the Fourth Republic's governments. In 1947, he became mayor of Bordeaux, which was for 48 years his electoral fief. As a member of the National Assembly, he sat with the RPF.

In 1953, when the RPF group split (and Charles de Gaulle supposedly retired), Chaban-Delmas became head of the Union of Republicans for Social Action and president of the National Centre of Social Republicans party. He "tied up" with centre-left parties and joined Pierre Mendès-France's cabinet one year later as Minister of Public Works. He took part in the centre-left coalition Republican Front, which won the 1956 legislative election. He was France's Defence Minister in 1957–1958. His governmental participation during the Fourth Republic inspired the distrust of de Gaulle and some Gaullists.

Following de Gaulle's return to power in 1958, Chaban-Delmas agreed to the advent of the French Fifth Republic and the new Constitution. He took part in the foundation of the Union for the New Republic (UNR) and was elected, against de Gaulle's will, chairman of the National Assembly. He kept this function until the end of de Gaulle's presidency in 1969. Unlike some Gaullists, for instance, Jacques Soustelle, he supported de Gaulle's policy to end the Algerian War of Independence. During the 1959 UNR Congress, he was the first politician to evoke a "reserved presidential domain," composed chiefly of defence and diplomacy. This interpretation of the Constitution of 1958 has survived.

In 1969, when Georges Pompidou acceded to the presidency, he chose Chaban-Delmas, who had concluded that the May 68 crisis was the consequence of a strained and conflicted society, as prime minister. Chaban-Delmas tried to promote what he called "a new society", based on dialogue between the different social forces in French society. Amongst other reforms, government authority over the mass media was relaxed, while legislation was passed on social welfare coverage for the poor and elderly which consolidated France's profile as a welfare state. In addition, regular increases were made to the minimum wage which prevented greater wage disparities. A new legal aid scheme was introduced, along with a number of new social welfare benefits.

As a result of his social policies, Chaban-Delmas was viewed as too "progressive" by the "conservative" wing of the Gaullist movement. He was suspected of wanting to "tie up" again with the centre-left. Indeed, his advisers who inspired the "new society" programme were considered as close to the centre-left (Simon Nora and Jacques Delors, who would serve as Finance Minister under François Mitterrand). Besides, a latent conflict opposed Chaban-Delmas to President Pompidou and the presidential circle. They accused him of trying to weaken the presidency in favour of himself. The satirical paper Le Canard Enchaîné accused him of breaking the law through tax evasion and in 1972, Chaban-Delmas canvassed for a vote of confidence in the Assembly. He did obtain this, but the President still managed to force his resignation.

Two years later, following the death in office of President Pompidou, Chaban-Delmas ran for the presidency himself. He was supported by the "lords of gaullism", but 43 personalities close to the late president, led by Jacques Chirac, published the Call of the 43 in favour of the candidacy of Valéry Giscard d'Estaing. Chaban-Delmas was defeated on the first ballot of the 1974 presidential election, winning only 15.10% of the vote. Chirac became President Giscard d'Estaing's prime minister.

Chaban-Delmas stood in the Gaullist Party (RPR) and, in spite of Chirac's leadership, returned to the chair of the National Assembly (1978–1981). Due to his friendship with President Mitterrand, his name was mentioned as a possible prime minister during the first "cohabitation" (1986–1988), but he instead became president of the National Assembly for the third time and Chirac again became premier.

Chaban-Delmas retired in 1997, towards the end of his thirteenth term of member of the National Assembly and two years after the end of his eighth term as Mayor of Bordeaux.

== Political career ==
Governmental functions

Prime minister: 1969–1972

Minister of Public Works, Transport, and Tourism: June–August 1954 / 1954–1955

Minister of Housing and Reconstruction: September–November 1954

Minister of State: 1956–1957

Minister of Defence and Armed Forces: 1957–1958

Electoral mandates

National Assembly of France

President of the National Assembly: 1958–1969 / 1978–1981 / 1986–1988

Member of the National Assembly for the Gironde 2nd : 1946–1969 (Became Prime minister in 1969) / 1972–1997. Elected in June 1946, reelected in November 1946, 1951, 1956, 1958, 1962, 1967, 1968, 1973, 1978, 1981, 1988, 1993.

Regional Council

President of the Regional Council of Aquitaine : 1974–1979 / 1985–1988 (Resignation). Elected in 1986.

Regional councillor of Aquitaine : 1974–1979 / 1985–1988 (Resignation). Elected in 1986.

Municipal Council

Mayor of Bordeaux : 1947–1995. Reelected in 1953, 1959, 1965, 1971, 1977, 1983, 1989.

Municipal councillor of Bordeaux : 1947–1995. Reelected in 1953, 1959, 1965, 1971, 1977, 1983, 1989.

Urban Community Council

President of the Urban Community of Bordeaux : 1967–1983 / 1983–1995. Reelected in 1971, 1983, 1989.

Vice-president of the Urban Community of Bordeaux : 1977–1983.

== Chaban-Delmas Cabinet ==
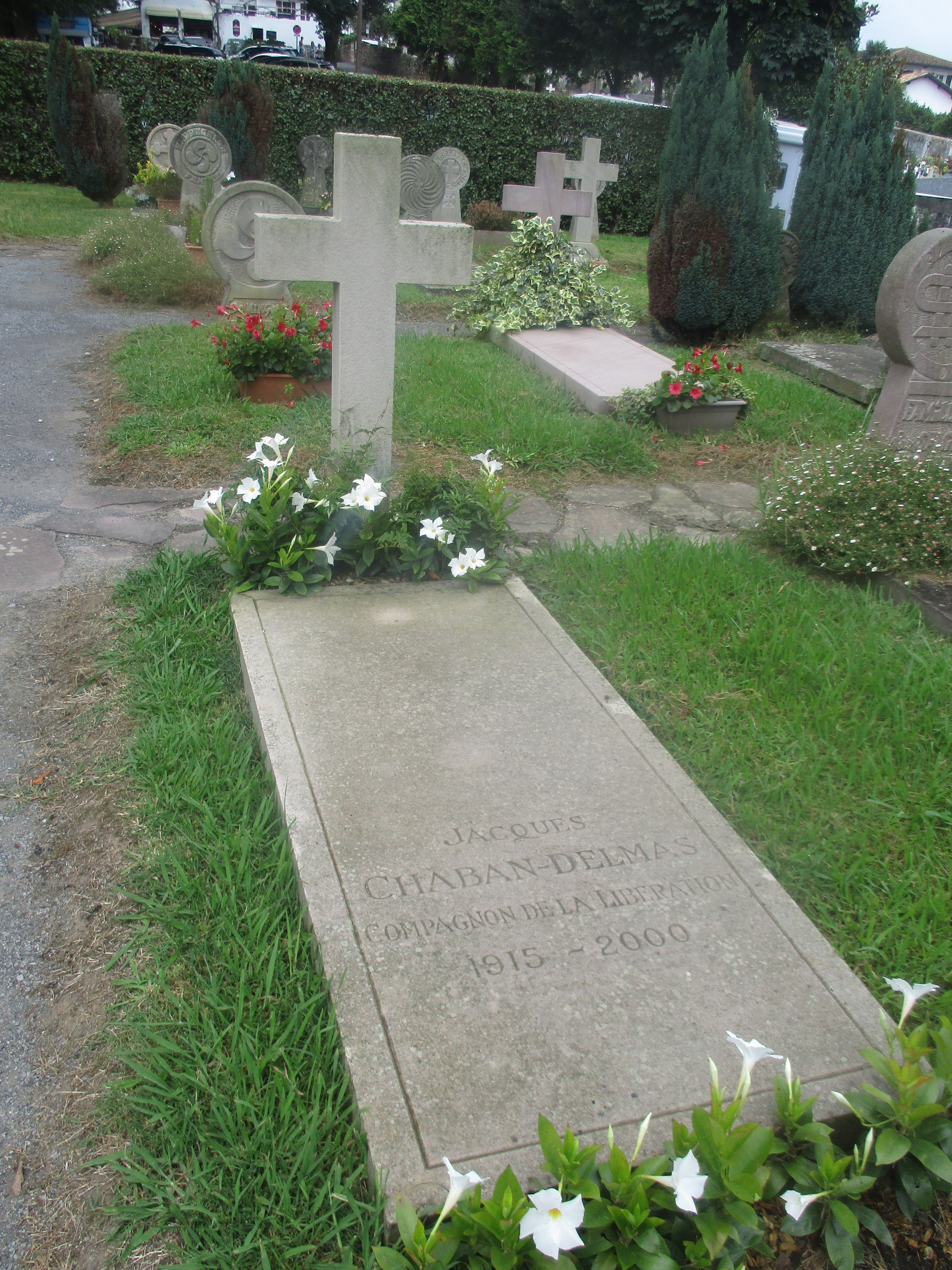
Tomb in Ascain.

- Minister of Foreign Affairs – Maurice Schumann
- ... National Defence – Michel Debré
- ... the Interior – Raymond Marcellin
- ... Economy and Finance – Valéry Giscard d'Estaing
- ... Industrial and Scientific Development – François-Xavier Ortoli
- ... Labour, Employment, and Population – Joseph Fontanet
- ... Justice – René Pleven
- ... National Education – Olivier Guichard
- ... Veterans and War Victims – Henri Duvillard
- ... Cultural Affairs – Edmond Michelet
- ... Agriculture – Jacques Duhamel
- ... Housing and Equipment – Albin Chalandon
- ... Transport – Raymond Mondon
- ... Relations with Parliament – Roger Frey
- ... Public Health and Social Security – Robert Boulin
- ... Posts and Telecommunications – Robert Galley

Changes

- 19 October 1970 – André Bettencourt succeeds Michelet (d. 9 October 1970) as interim Minister of Cultural Affairs
- 7 January 1971 – Jacques Duhamel succeeds Bettencourt as Minister of Cultural Affairs. Michel Cointat succeeds Duhamel as Minister of Agriculture. Jean Chamant succeeds Mondon (d. 31 December 1970) as Minister of Transport. Roger Frey becomes Minister of Administrative Reforms and is not replaced as Minister of Relations with Parliament.
- 25 February 1971 – Pierre Messmer enters the ministry as Minister of Overseas Departments and Territories.

Political offices
Preceded by Jacques Chastellain	Minister of Public Works, Transport and Tourism; 1954	Succeeded by Maurice Bourgès-Maunoury
Preceded by Maurice Bourgès-Maunoury	Minister of Public Works, Transport and Tourism; 1954–1955	Succeeded by Édouard Corniglion-Molinier
Preceded by Eugène Claudius-Petit	Minister of Reconstruction and Housing; 1954	Succeeded by Maurice Lemaire
Preceded by —	Minister of State; 1956–1957	Succeeded by —
Preceded by André Morice	Minister of National Defence and the Armed Forces; 1957–1958	Succeeded by Pierre de Chevigné
Preceded by André Le Troquer	President of the National Assembly; 1958–1969	Succeeded by Achille Peretti
Preceded by Maurice Couve de Murville	Prime Minister of France; 1969–1972	Succeeded by Pierre Messmer
Preceded by Edgar Faure	President of the National Assembly; 1978–1981	Succeeded by Louis Mermaz
Preceded by Louis Mermaz	President of the National Assembly; 1986–1988	Succeeded by Laurent Fabius
