= Raymond Barre =

French politician and economist (1924–2007)

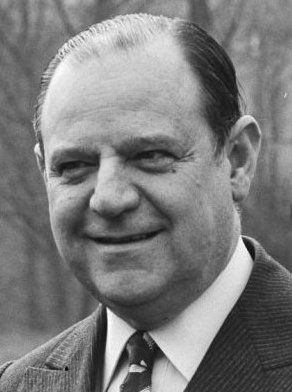
- Barre in 1980

Prime Minister of France
- In office 25 August 1976 – 21 May 1981
- President: Valéry Giscard d'Estaing
- Preceded by: Jacques Chirac
- Succeeded by: Pierre Mauroy

Mayor of Lyon
- In office 25 June 1995 – 25 March 2001
- Preceded by: Michel Noir
- Succeeded by: Gérard Collomb

Minister of the Economy and Finance
- In office 27 August 1976 – 5 April 1978
- Prime Minister: Himself
- Preceded by: Jean-Pierre Fourcade
- Succeeded by: René Monory

Minister of Foreign Trade
- In office 12 January 1976 – 25 August 1976
- Prime Minister: Jacques Chirac
- Preceded by: Norbert Ségard
- Succeeded by: André Rossi

European Commissioner for Economic and Financial Affairs
- In office 7 February 1967 – 5 January 1973
- President: Jean Rey; Franco Maria Malfatti; Sicco Mansholt
- Preceded by: Robert Marjolin
- Succeeded by: Wilhelm Haferkamp

Personal details
- Born: Raymond Octave Joseph Barre; 12 April 1924 Saint-Denis, France
- Died: 25 August 2007 (aged 83) Paris, France
- Party: Independent, affiliated with UDF

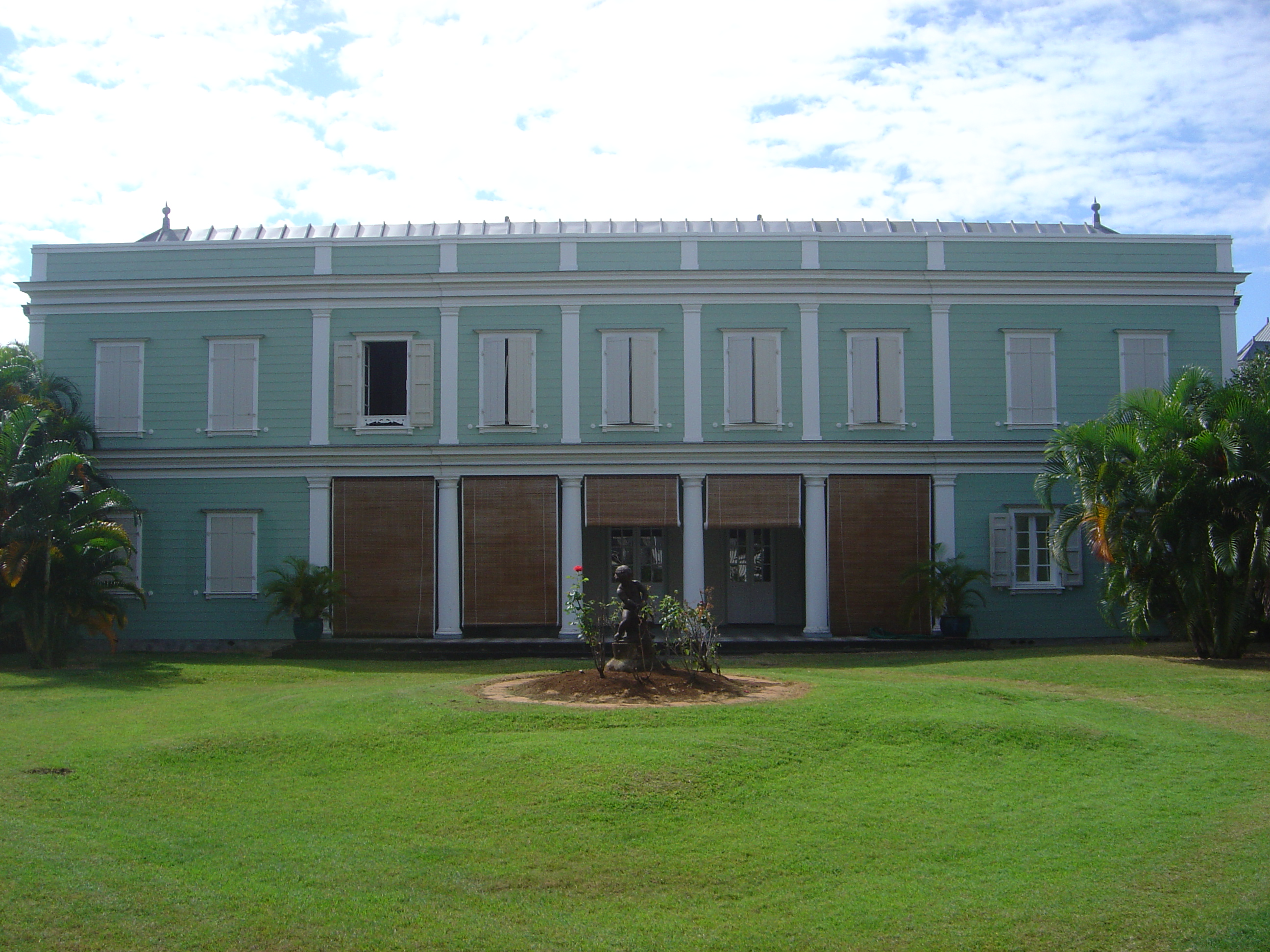
The house where Raymond Barre was born in Saint-Denis, Réunion

Raymond Octave Joseph Barre (French: [ʁɛmɔ̃ baʁ]; 12 April 1924 – 25 August 2007) was a French politician and economist. He was a Vice President of the European Commission and Commissioner for Economic and Financial Affairs under three presidents (Rey, Malfatti and Mansholt). He later served as Prime Minister under Valéry Giscard d'Estaing from 1976 until 1981. As a candidate for the presidency in 1988, he came in third and was eliminated in the first round. He was born in Saint-Denis, on the French island of Réunion, and then still a colony (it became an overseas department in 1946).

== Career ==
=== Professional life ===
After his education, Raymond Barre was a professor of economics at the Institut d'Etudes Politiques de Paris (Sciences Po) as well as École Centrale Paris.

From 1959 to 1962, he was director of Jean-Marcel Jeanneney's staff in the ministry of Industry and Trade. Then, in 1967, President Charles de Gaulle chose him as Vice-President of the European Commission for Economic & Financial Affairs. He stayed in Brussels until January 1973, serving in the Rey, Malfatti and Mansholt Commissions. Having come back to France, he joined the cabinet as minister of External Trade in January 1976.

=== Premiership ===
Seven months later, while mostly unknown at that time, President Giscard d'Estaing appointed him Prime Minister and Minister of Economy and Finance. He presented him to the French people as "the best economist in France" (French: meilleur économiste de France). Under the Fifth Republic, he was the only person to hold these two offices at the same time. He left the ministry of Economy and Finance in 1978 but stayed as Prime minister until the defeat of Giscard d'Estaing at the 1981 presidential election.

At the head of the cabinet, he was faced with the conflict which divided the parliamentary majority between the "Giscardians" and the neo-Gaullist Rally for the Republic (RPR) led by his predecessor Jacques Chirac. The right majority unexpectedly won the 1978 legislative election.

Barre was primarily confronted with an economic crisis. He advocated numerous complex, strict policies ("Barre Plans"). The first Barre plan emerged on 22 September 1976, with a priority to stop inflation. It included a 3-month price freeze; a reduction in the value-added tax; wage controls; salary controls; a reduction of the growth in the money supply; and increases in the income tax, automobile taxes, luxury taxes and bank rates. There were measures to restore the trade balance and support the growth of the economy and employment. Oil imports, whose price had shot up, were limited. There was special aid to exports, and an action fund was set up to aid industries. There was increased financial aid to farmers, who were suffering from a drought, and for social security. The package was not very popular but was pursued with vigour.

He did not use diplomatic language in the face of trade union opposition. Instead, he mocked "the bearers of banners" (French: les porteurs de pancartes) and he exhorted "instead of grousing, you should work hard".

=== Post-premiership ===
After he resigned as head of the cabinet, he was elected deputy of Rhône département under the label of the Union for French Democracy (UDF). However, he never formally joined the party. He held his parliamentary seat until 2002.

In the 1980s, he competed for the leadership of the right against Chirac. Believing that the "cohabitation" was incompatible with the "Fifth Republic", he let Chirac take the lead of the cabinet after the 1986 legislative election. He ran as UDF candidate for president in the 1988 election, but some components of his party covertly supported the other right-wing candidate, the Neo-Gaullist Prime Minister Jacques Chirac. In this, in spite of positive polls at the beginning of the campaign, he came third behind the two protagonists of the "cohabitation": the Socialist President François Mitterrand and Jacques Chirac. For the second round, he called his voters to transfer to the RPR candidate, who was finally defeated.

After his presidential candidacy failed, he focused on his local tenures in Lyon. In 1995, the RPR Mayor of Lyon, Michel Noir, could not compete for another term due to a judicial indictment, so Barre was the conservative candidate for the mayoralty. He was elected, but he did not run for a second term in 2001. One year later, he finished his last parliamentary term in the French National Assembly and retired from politics.

Raymond Barre was probably the only French politician to have reached such high levels of responsibility without having ever been an official member or leader of any political party. He always kept some distance from what he considered to be the political "microcosm".

Raymond Barre died on 25 August 2007 at age 83 at the Val-de-Grâce military hospital in Paris, where he was being treated for heart problems since his transfer from a hospital in Monaco on 11 April 2007.

== Political career ==
Governmental functions

Prime minister: 1976–1981.

Minister of Economy and Finance: 1976–1978.

Minister of Foreign Trade: January–August 1976.

Electoral mandates

National Assembly of France

Member of the National Assembly of France for Rhône (department) : 1981–2002. Elected in 1981, reelected in 1986, 1988, 1993, 1997.

Municipal Council

Mayor of Lyon : 1995–2001.

Municipal councillor of Lyon: 1995–2001.

Urban community Council

President of the Urban Community of Lyon: 1995–2001.

Member of the Urban Community of Lyon: 1995–2001.

Bilderberg Conference participant 1983

== Allegations of antisemitism ==
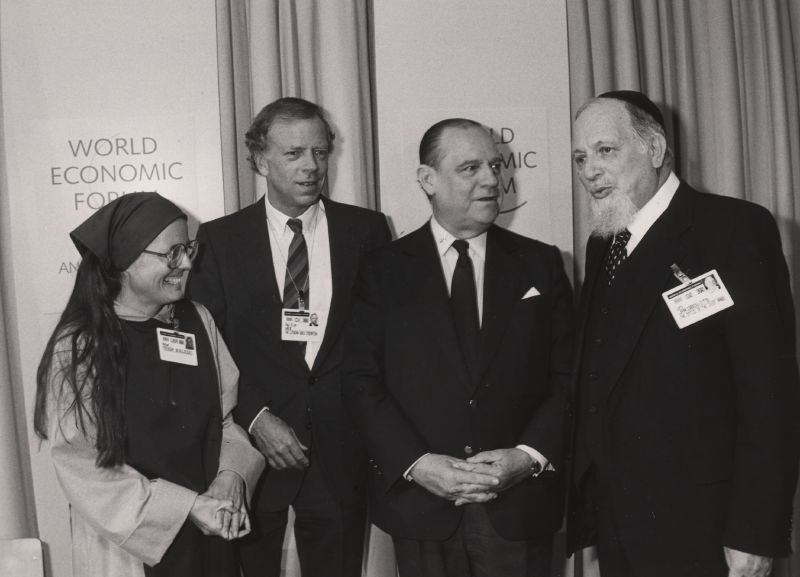
Raymond Barre standing next to Mother Tessa Bielecki and Rabbi Immanuel Jakobovits during the 1989 World Economic Forum

On several occasions, Raymond Barre made remarks that were interpreted as antisemitic, or at least supportive of antisemitism. In 1980, when he was prime minister, a bombing was attempted against the Union Libérale Israélite de France, a synagogue in the rue Copernic, Paris; however the bomb detonated in the street when the Jews attending shabbat were inside the synagogue, and not when they were out; but as a result some non-Jewish bystanders were killed. Raymond Barre then famously denounced:

"A hateful attack which wanted to strike at the Jews who were in that synagogue, and which struck innocent French people who were crossing the street."

In 2007, Barre argued on a radio show that "the Jewish lobby" had orchestrated criticism regarding his 1980 remarks. On this same show, Barre defended the collaborationist Maurice Papon at his trial, describing him as "a scapegoat". Barre was criticized for these remarks.

== Governments ==
=== Barre's First Government, 25 August 1976 – 30 March 1977 ===
- Raymond Barre – Prime Minister and Minister of Economy and Finance
- Louis de Guiringaud – Minister of Foreign Affairs
- Yvon Bourges – Minister of Defense
- Michel Poniatowski – Minister of the Interior
- Michel d'Ornano – Minister of Industry and Research
- Christian Beullac – Minister of Labour
- Olivier Guichard – Minister of Justice
- René Haby – Minister of Education
- Christian Bonnet – Minister of Agriculture
- Jean-Pierre Fourcade – Minister of Equipment
- Robert Boulin – Minister of Relations with Parliament
- Simone Veil – Minister of Health
- Robert Galley – Minister of Cooperation
- Pierre Brousse – Minister of Commerce and Craft Industry
- André Rossi – Minister of External Commerce
- Vincent Ansquer – Minister of Quality of Life
- Jean Lecanuet – Minister of Planning

=== Barre's Second Government, 30 March 1977 – 5 April 1978 ===
- Raymond Barre – Prime Minister and Minister of Economy and Finance
- Louis de Guiringaud – Minister of Foreign Affairs
- Yvon Bourges – Minister of Defense
- Christian Bonnet – Minister of the Interior
- René Monory – Minister of Industry, Commerce, and Craft Industry
- Christian Beullac – Minister of Labour
- Alain Peyrefitte – Minister of Justice
- René Haby – Minister of Education
- Michel d'Ornano – Minister of Culture and Environment
- Pierre Méhaignerie – Minister of Agriculture
- Jean-Pierre Fourcade – Minister of Equipment and Regional Planning
- Simone Veil – Minister of Health and Social Security
- Robert Galley – Minister of Cooperation
- André Rossi – Minister of External Commerce

Changes

- 26 September 1977 – Fernand Icart succeeds Fourcade as Minister of Equipment and Regional Planning.

=== Barre's Third Government, 5 April 1978 – 21 May 1981 ===
- Raymond Barre – Prime Minister
- Louis de Guiringaud – Minister of Foreign Affairs
- Yvon Bourges – Minister of Defense
- Christian Bonnet – Minister of the Interior
- René Monory – Minister of Economy
- Maurice Papon – Minister of Budget
- André Giraud – Minister of Industry
- Robert Boulin – Minister of Labour and Participation
- Alain Peyrefitte – Minister of Justice
- Christian Beullac – Minister of Education
- Alice Saunier-Seité – Minister of Universities
- Jean-Philippe Lecat – Minister of Culture and Communication
- Pierre Méhaignerie – Minister of Agriculture
- Michel d'Ornano – Minister of Environment and Quality of Life
- Jean-Pierre Soisson – Minister of Youth, Sports, and Leisure
- Fernand Icart – Minister of Equipment and Regional Planning
- Joël Le Theule – Minister of Transport
- Simone Veil – Minister of Health and Family
- Robert Galley – Minister of Cooperation
- Jacques Barrot – Minister of Commerce and Craft Industry
- Jean-François Deniau – Minister of External Commerce

Changes

- 29 November 1978 – Jean François-Poncet succeeds Guiringaud as Minister of Foreign Affairs.
- 4 July 1979 – Jacques Barrot succeeds Veil as Minister of Health and Social Security. Maurice Charretier succeeds Barrot as Minister of Commerce and Craft Industry.
- 29 October 1979 – Jean Mattéoli succeeds Boulin as Minister of Labour and Participation.
- 2 October 1980 – Joël Le Theule succeeds Bourges as Minister of Defense. Daniel Hoeffel succeeds Le Theule as Minister of Transport. Michel Cointat succeeds Deniau as Minister of External Commerce.
- 22 December 1980 – Robert Galley succeeds Le Theule (d.14 December) as Minister of Defense.
- 4 March 1981 – Michel d'Ornano succeeds Lecat as Minister of Culture. No one succeeds Lecat as Minister of Communication.

== Retirement ==
Barre retired from active politics in June 2002. He had been treated at a hospital for a heart condition since April 2007 when he died on 25 August 2007. He was survived by his wife and two sons.

== Honours ==
=== French Honours ===
- Grand Cross of the National Order of Merit
- Commander of the Order of Merit for Commerce and Industry
- Officier of the Legion of Honour
- Officier of the Ordre des Palmes académiques
- Knight of the Order of Agricultural Merit

=== Foreign Honours ===
- Morocco : Grand Officer of the Order of Ouissam Alaouite
- Quebec : Officier of the National Order of Quebec
- Spain : Knight Grand Cross of the Order of Isabella the Catholic
- Tunisia : Grand Cordon of the Order of the Republic

== Works ==
- La Période dans l'analyse économique – une approche à l'étude du temps, SEDEIS, 1950
- Économie politique, Paris, Presses universitaires de France, Thémis économie, 1959
- Le Développement économique : analyse et politique, 1958
- Une politique pour l'avenir, Plon, 1981
- La Désinflation, Paris, Que sais-je ?, 1983
- Un plan pour l'Europe – la Communauté européenne, problèmes et perspectives, Presses universitaires de Nancy, 1984
- Réflexions pour demain, 1984, Pluriel ISBN 2010102673
- Au tournant du siècle, Plon, 1988
- Questions de confiance – Entretiens avec Jean-Marie Colombani, Flammarion, 1988
- Entretiens, collectif, 2001
- L'Expérience du pouvoir, conversations avec Jean Bothorel, Fayard, 2007 ISBN 2213630313.

Political offices
Preceded by Henri Rochereau	French European Commissioner; 1967–1973; Served alongside: Jean-François Deniau, Henri Rochereau	Succeeded by Jean-François Deniau
Preceded by Robert Marjolin	French European Commissioner; 1967–1973; Served alongside: Jean-François Deniau, Henri Rochereau	Succeeded by Claude Cheysson
Preceded by Robert Marjolin	French European Commissioner; 1967–1973; Served alongside: Jean-François Deniau, Henri Rochereau	Succeeded by François-Xavier Ortoli
Preceded by Robert Marjolin	European Commissioner for Economic and Financial Affairs; 1967–1973	Succeeded by Wilhelm Haferkamp
Preceded by Norbert Ségard	Minister of Foreign Trade; 1976	Succeeded by André Rossi
Preceded by Jacques Chirac	Prime Minister of France; 1976–1981	Succeeded by Pierre Mauroy
Preceded by Jean-Pierre Fourcade	Minister of the Economy and Finance; 1976–1978	Succeeded by René Monory
Preceded by Michel Noir	Mayor of Lyon; 1995–2001	Succeeded by Gérard Collomb
