= Christian Beullac =

French politician (1923–1986)

Christian Beullac (29 November 1923 in Marseillan (Hérault) – 16 June 1986) was a French politician best known for leading the ministries of education and social affairs.

== Biography ==
After secondary education in Nice and at the Champollion lycée in Grenoble, he went to the École polytechnique in 1943 and entered the Corps des ponts et chaussées. He also qualified from the École supérieure d'électricité and the Institut d'études politiques de Paris.

His career began in 1949. He was successively assistant to the Director of Electricity at the Industry Ministry (1949–1952), rapporteur for the energy commission of the 2nd Plan (1952–1954) and attached to the Industry Minister's cabinet for energy questions (1954–1955).

In 1955 he joined the Renault Group holding various posts: director-general for production (1964), industrial director general (1967), assistant general director (1971) and general director (1976).

Called into the government by Raymond Barre, prime minister at the time, he was Minister of Social Affairs from 1976 to 1978. Following the French general election of 1978, he accepted the national education portfolio (1978–1981). He opened schools to the world of business and in 1979 reorganised the training of teachers. Spread over three years, this training had to be organised jointly by schools and the universities and sanctioned by a university diploma (the diplôme universitaire de 1er cycle). He also established the Projets d’Action Culturelles, Techniques et Éducatives (PACTE - Cultural, Technical and Educational Action Projects) which were the first steps towards the autonomy of educational establishments. The PACTEs later became Projet d’Action Éducative (PAE - Educational Action Projects). Beullac also created the CNPRU (Comité national de réflexion sur la professionalisation de l'université) aimed at professionalising universities.

From 1981 to 1986 he was a director of the international consultancy firm, Euréquip.

== Government posts ==
- Minister of Labour in Raymond Barre's first government (27 August 1976 to 30 March 1977).
- Minister of Labour in Raymond Barre's second government (30 March 1977 to 5 April 1978).
- Minister of Education in Raymond Barre's third government (5 April 1978 to 22 May 1981).

Political offices
Preceded by Michel Durafour	Minister of Labour; 1976–1978	Succeeded by Robert Boulin
Preceded by René Haby	Minister of National Education; 1978–1981	Succeeded by Alain Savary
