= René Haby =

French politician

Minister of National Education
- In office 27 May 1974 – 31 March 1978
- President: Valéry Giscard d'Estaing
- Prime Minister: Raymond Barre; Jacques Chirac
- Preceded by: Joseph Fontanet
- Succeeded by: Christian Beullac

Personal details
- Born: 9 October 1919 Dombasle-sur-Meurthe, France
- Died: 6 February 2003 (aged 83) 10th arrondissement of Paris, France
- Party: UDF
- Children: Jean-Yves Haby

René Haby (9 October 1919, in Dombasle-sur-Meurthe – 6 February 2003) was a French politician. He had been a prisoner of war during World War II. He was a member of the Union for French Democracy. From 28 May 1974 until 5 April 1978 he was Minister of National Education. A major reform instituted under Haby was the loi Haby that allowed students to take classes in what were called "regional languages", such as Corsican, at any stage in their education.

Political offices
Preceded by Joseph Fontanet	Minister of National Education of France; 1974–1978	Succeeded by Christian Beullac
