= Pierre de Chevigné =

French politician

Minister of Defence
- In office 14 May 1958 – 1 June 1958
- Prime Minister: Pierre Pflimlin
- Preceded by: Jacques Chaban-Delmas
- Succeeded by: Charles de Gaulle

Personal details
- Born: Pierre Gabriel Adhéaume de Chevigné; 16 June 1909 Toulon, France
- Died: 4 August 2004 (aged 95) Biarritz, France
- Party: Popular Republican Movement
- Spouses: Hélène Rodocanachi (died 1939): Anne d'Ormesson
- Relations: Henri de Castries (grandson)
- Children: 2

Pierre Gabriel Adhéaume de Chevigné (French pronunciation: [pjɛʁ ɡabʁijɛl adeom də ʃəviɲe]; 16 June 1909 – 4 August 2004) was a French politician, who was the Minister of Defence in the Fourth Republic between 14 May and 1 June 1958.

== Early life ==
Chevigné was born on 16 June 1909 in Toulon. He was a son of François Henri Marie Joseph Auguste de Chevigné and the former Gisèle Colas.

== Career ==
Chevigné graduated from Saint Cyr and became a career officer. He was wounded on several occasions in 1940, managed to rejoin Charles de Gaulle in London and was a colonel in the Free French Forces. After initial postings in Syria and Lebanon he was sent to Washington in 1942 as military attaché for the Free French. Upon his return to London he became chief of staff of the French Forces in Great-Britain.

After the Liberation he was sent to Madagascar as High-Commissioner.

A member of the Popular Republican Movement party, briefly served as the Minister of Defence in the Fourth Republic between 14 May and 1 June 1958 under Prime Minister Pierre Pflimlin. In 1954, he was wounded slightly by grenade fragments during a tour of the Indo-China fighting front while inspecting French troops that had landed in territory held by Communist Việt Minh rebels. Prime Minister Pflimlin served only briefly before the May 1958 crisis in France during the turmoil of the Algerian War of Independence which led to the collapse of the Fourth Republic and its replacement by the Fifth Republic led by Charles de Gaulle who returned to power after a twelve-year absence.

He traveled to New York City in 1952.

== Personal life ==
He was married to Hélène Rodocanachi (1911–1939), a daughter of Petros Rodocanachis and the former Chariklia Salvagou. Together, they had two daughters, including:

- Gisèle Françoise Andrée Simone de Chevigné (b. 1933), who married Count François de La Croix de Castries (1919/20–2011) who had a military career in Korea, Indochina, and Algeria.

After the death of his wife in 1939, he remarried to Anne d'Ormesson (c. 1915–2008).

Pierre de Chevigné died in Biarritz on 4 April 2004.

Political offices
| Preceded by Jacques Chaban-Delmas | Minister of the Armed Forces; 1958–1958 | Succeeded by Charles de Gaulle |
