= Francisque Collomb =

French politician

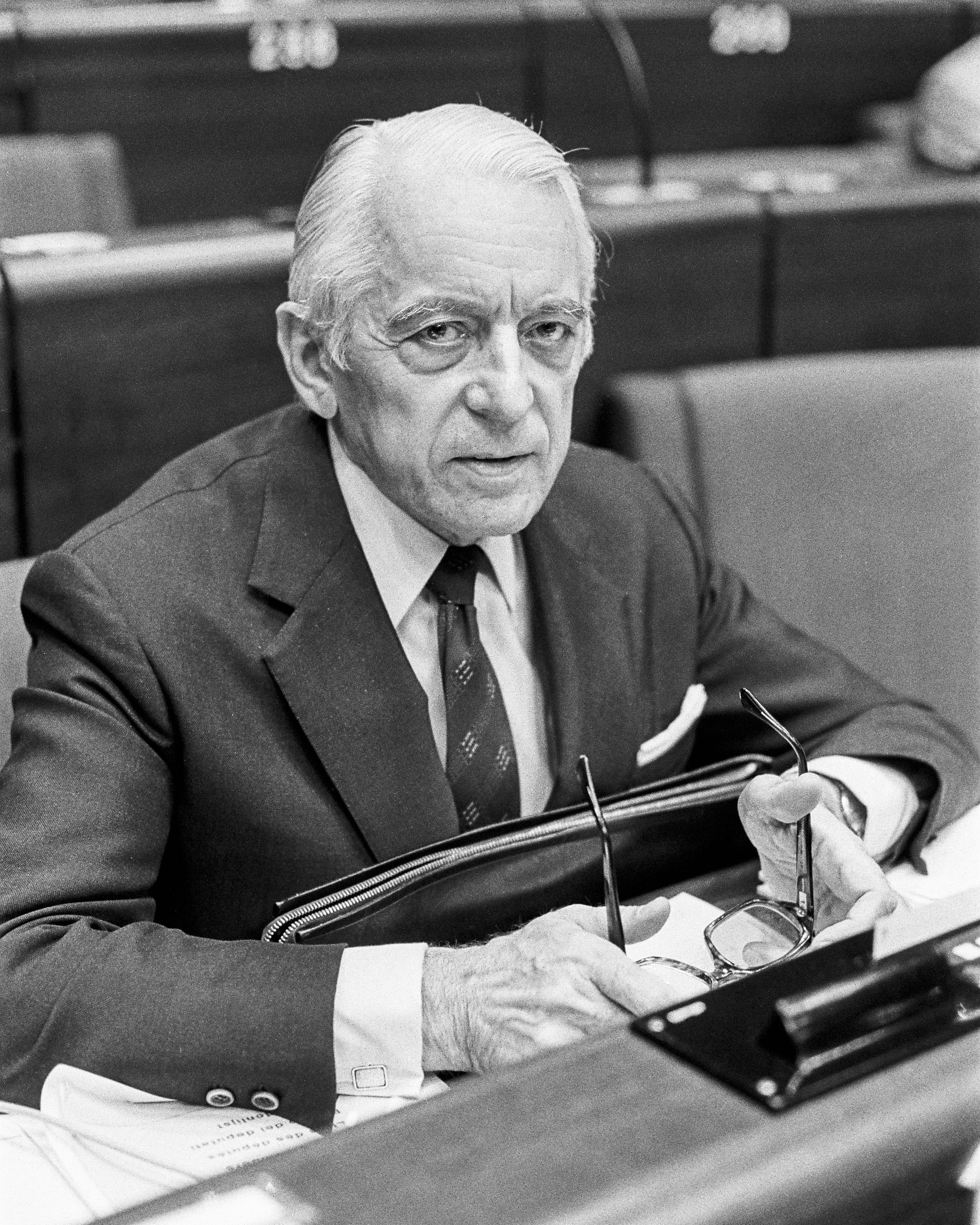
- Collomb in 1983

Mayor of Lyon
- In office 1976–1989
- Preceded by: Louis Pradel
- Succeeded by: Michel Noir

Member of the French Senate for Rhône
- In office 1968–1995

Personal details
- Born: 19 December 1910 Saint-Rambert-en-Bugey, France
- Died: 24 July 2009 (aged 98) Lyon, France
- Party: UDF

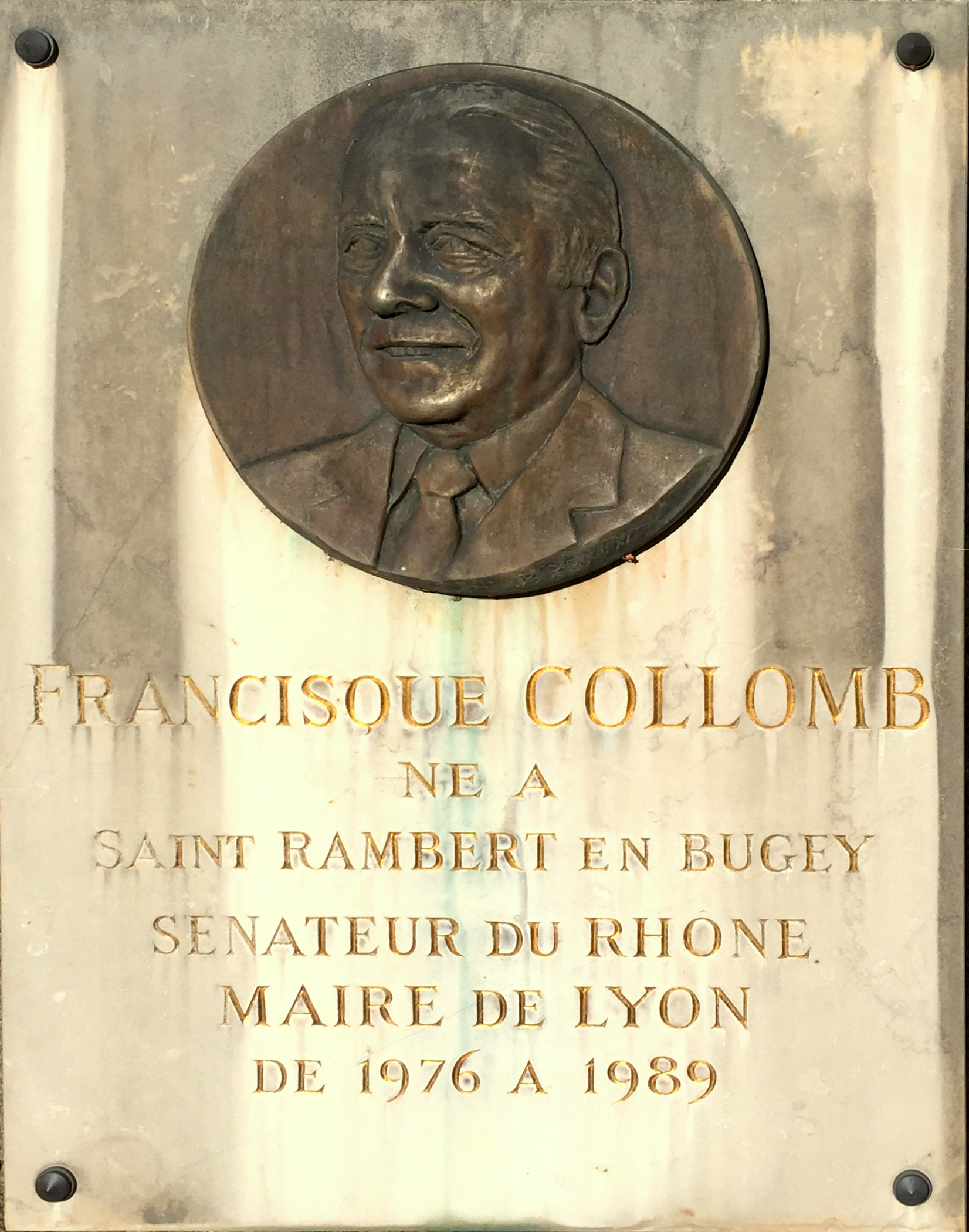
Plaque Francisque Collomb - Saint-Rambert.JPG

Francisque Collomb (Saint-Rambert-en-Bugey, Ain 19 December 1910 – Lyon, 24 July 2009) was a French politician and the Mayor of Lyon from 1976 to 1989. He was also elected a member of the European Parliament in the 1979 elections, a position he held until 1984, representing the European People's Party. Another important position he held was being a member of the French Senate for Rhône from 1968 to 1995.
