= Alice Saunier-Seité =

French geographer, politician

- Born: Alice Louise Saunier; 26 April 1925; Saint-Jean-le-Centenier, France
- Died: 4 August 2003 (aged 78); Paris, France
- Other name: Alice Picard
- Occupations: Geographer, historian, university professor, politician
- Known for: First female minister for universities in France

Alice Louise Saunier-Seïté (26 April 1925 – 4 August 2003) was a French geographer, historian, university professor and politician of the Parti Républicain. She was a State Secretary and the first female minister for universities, serving from 1978 to 1981, when she also briefly served as Assistant Minister to the Prime Minister for family and women. She is remembered as the first female dean and first female rector of a university in France. She is remembered also as the minister who ordered that the experimental university in Vincennes be razed to the ground during the night of 27 August 1980, that all physical trace of the world-renowned left-leaning university be removed.

== Life and work ==
=== Academia ===
Alice Louise Saunier attended the Lycée de Tournon where she came into contact with the French Resistance movement. She then began studying oriental languages at a special school, and she completed her studies with a diploma. She went on to work at the French National Centre for Scientific Research (CNRS) between 1958 and 1963 and at the same time studied for her doctorate in geography. She finished that work in 1963 for which she devoted one thesis to the Oetzal Alps and an additional thesis about the Alpine wind, called Suedfoehn, which blows over Innsbruck, Austria. Upon finishing her PhD, in 1963, she was appointed geography lecturer in Brest, France and soon thereafter she was appointed a lecturer in geography at the University of Rennes, soon taking on a professorship in geography there in 1965. In 1968 she returned to the University of Brest and when she was named dean of the Faculty of Human and Social Sciences she became the first woman to serve as a dean in France.

The next year, Saunier took over a professorship at the University of Paris V (Université Paris-Descartes) where she worked from 1969 to 1970, before moving to the newly founded University of Paris XI (Université Paris-Sud). There she became the director of the Institut Universitaire Technology (IUT) in Sceaux, between 1970 and 1973. When she became rector of the Académie de Reims, she was the first woman to head a university in France.

=== State Secretary and Minister ===
On 28 August 1976, Saunier-Seïté was appointed State Secretary for Universities in the first cabinet of prime minister Raymond Barre under the presidency of Valéry Giscard d'Estaing. She also held this position in the second Barre cabinet until January 1978 when she was appointed Minister for Universities. She held this ministerial office in the third Barre cabinet as well until the University Ministry was dissolved in March 1981. She was the first female minister for universities.

In 1980, despite resistance from students and staff, the University of Paris VIII was moved from Vincennes to Saint-Denis. After the dissolution of the University Ministry, she took over the post of Assistant Minister to the Prime Minister for Family and Women on 4 March 1981 following the resignation of Monique Pelletier. She held that post until the end of Barre's term on 14 May 1981.

After leaving government, Saunier-Seïté served as a professor at the Conservatoire national des arts et métiers (CNAM) between 1981 and 1994 and was the first woman to take up a chair at this renowned school. In addition to her teaching work, she was a member of the Paris City Council from 1983 to 2002, where she initially dealt with traffic, police and security issues before later becoming chairwoman of the city planning committee. She was also involved in the National Movement of Local Politicians, of which she was chairwoman from 1990 to 1998.

=== Personal life ===
Saunier-Seïté was the daughter of Daniel Saunier and Marie-Louise Lascombe and was married twice. Her first marriage, to Élie-Jacques Picard (during which time she was published using the name Alice Picard), ended in divorce. Her second marriage was to Jérome Seïté, who predeceased her. In her leisure hours, she enjoyed fencing and open-water fishing.

== Tributes ==
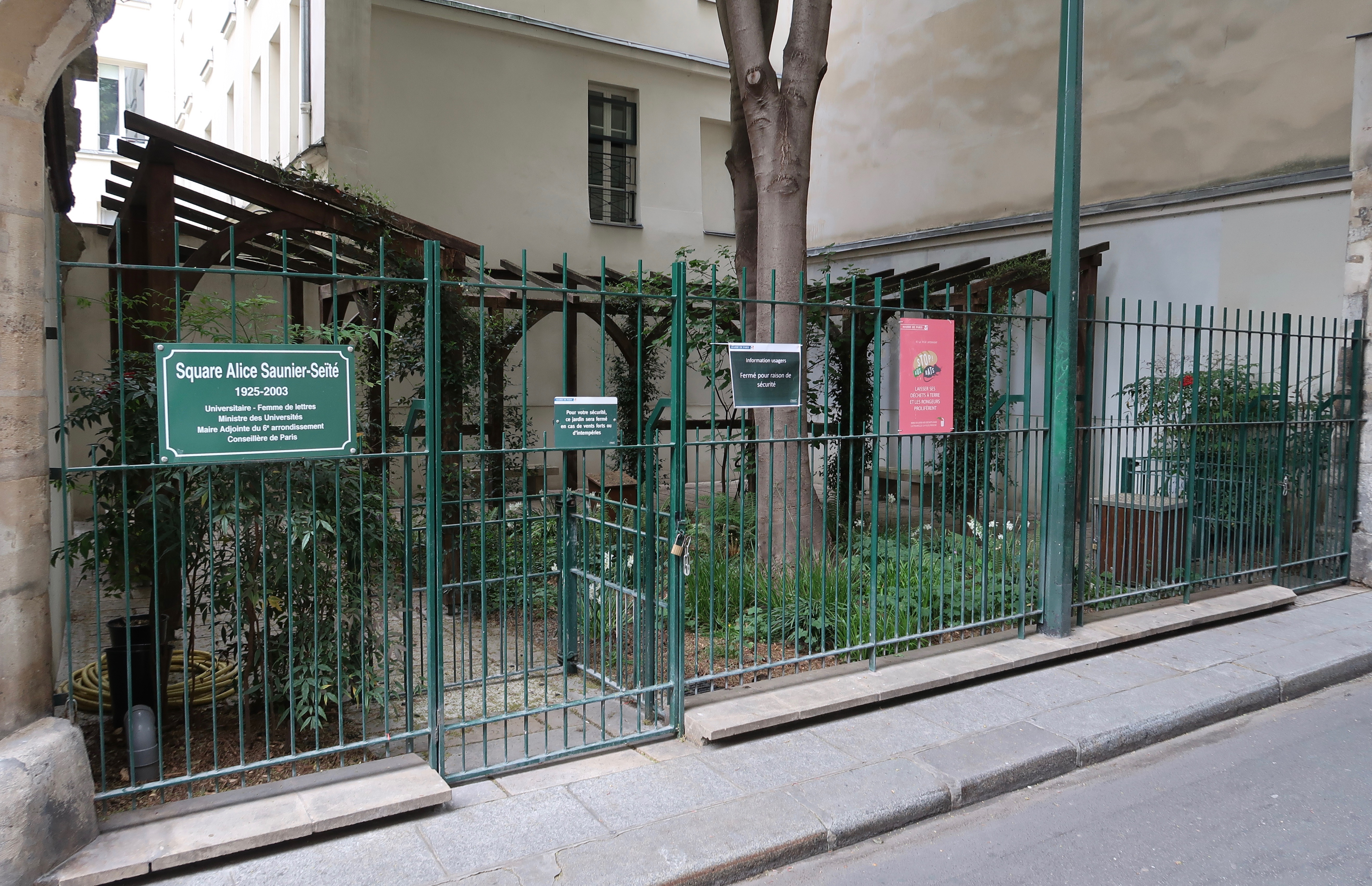
Garden named for Alice Saunier-Seïté in Paris.

- In 2017, the garden on rue Visconti in the 6th arrondissement of Paris was named in her honor.
- In 1997, Grand Officer of the National Order of Merit.
- In 1995, Commander of Arts and Letters
- In 1994, Commander of the Legion of Honour
- In 1973, Commander of the French Order of Academic Palms

== Selected works ==
In addition to her teaching and political career, Alice Saunier-Seïté wrote books that dealt with geographical and historical topics. Her works, all in French, include:

- Les Vallées septentrionales du massif Oetztal, using her married name, Alice Picard, 1963
- Contribution à l'étude du Suedfoehn d'Innsbruck, using the name Alice Picard, 1965
- Le comte Boissy d'Anglas. Conventionnel et pair de France, France Univers, 1980
- En premier ligne. De la communale aux universities, Plon, 1982
- Remettre l'État à sa place, Plon / Le club Figaro Magazine, 1984
- Une Europe à la carte, Plon / Le club Figaro Magazine, 1985
- Le Cardinal de Tournon, le Richelieu de François Premiere. La Voute, Les Deux Mondes, 1998
- Les Courtenay. Destin d'une illustrious family bourguignonne, France Empire, 1998
- Dictionnaire des monuments d'Île-de-France, 1999
- Giscard à deux voix, Perrin, 2000
