= Michel Noir =

French politician

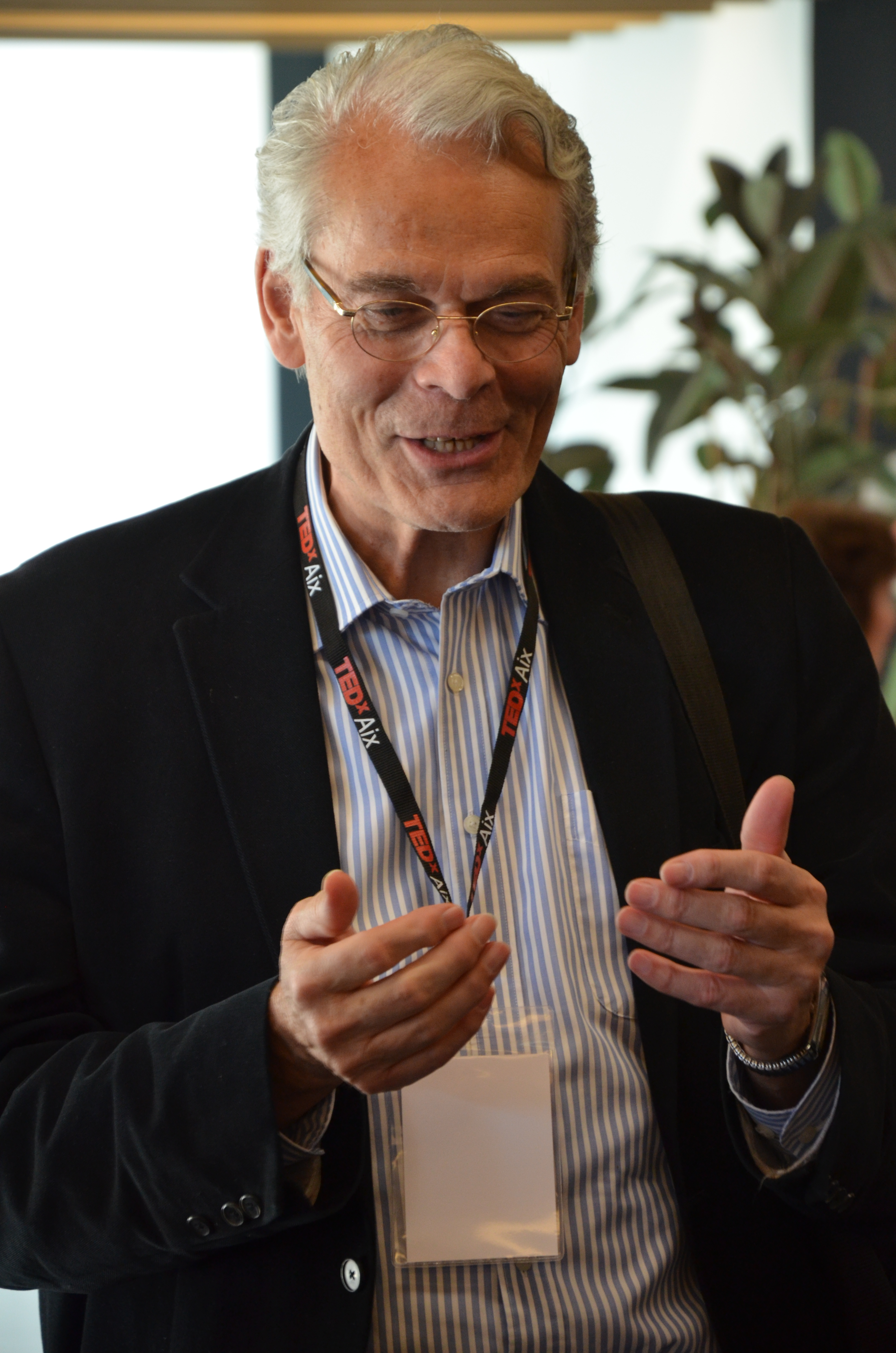
- Michel Noir in 2014

Mayor of Lyon
- In office 24 March 1989 – 18 June 1995
- Preceded by: Francisque Collomb
- Succeeded by: Raymond Barre

Member of the National Assembly for Rhône's 2nd constituency
- In office 23 June 1988 – 6 February 1997
- Succeeded by: Henry Chabert

Minister Delegate to Foreign trade
- In office 20 March 1986 – 10 May 1988
- President: François Mitterrand
- Prime Minister: Jacques Chirac
- Preceded by: Édith Cresson
- Succeeded by: Roger Fauroux

Personal details
- Born: 19 May 1944 (age 82) Lyon, France
- Party: RPR
- Education: Lumière University Lyon 2

Michel Noir (born 19 May 1944) is a French politician.

== Political career ==
Governmental functions

Minister of Foreign Trade : 1986-1988

Electoral mandates

National Assembly of France

Member of the National Assembly for Rhône : 1978-1986 (Became minister in 1986) / 1988-1995 (Resignation). Elected in 1978, reelected in 1981, 1986, 1988, 1993.

Municipal Council

Mayor of Lyon : 1989–1995.

Deputy-mayor of Lyon : 1983–1989.

Municipal councillor of Lyon : 1977–1995. Reelected in 1983, 1989.

Urban community Council

President of the Urban Community of Lyon : 1989–1995.

Member of the Urban Community of Lyon : 1977–1995. Reelected in 1983, 1989.
