= Maurice Schumann =

French politician (1911–1998)

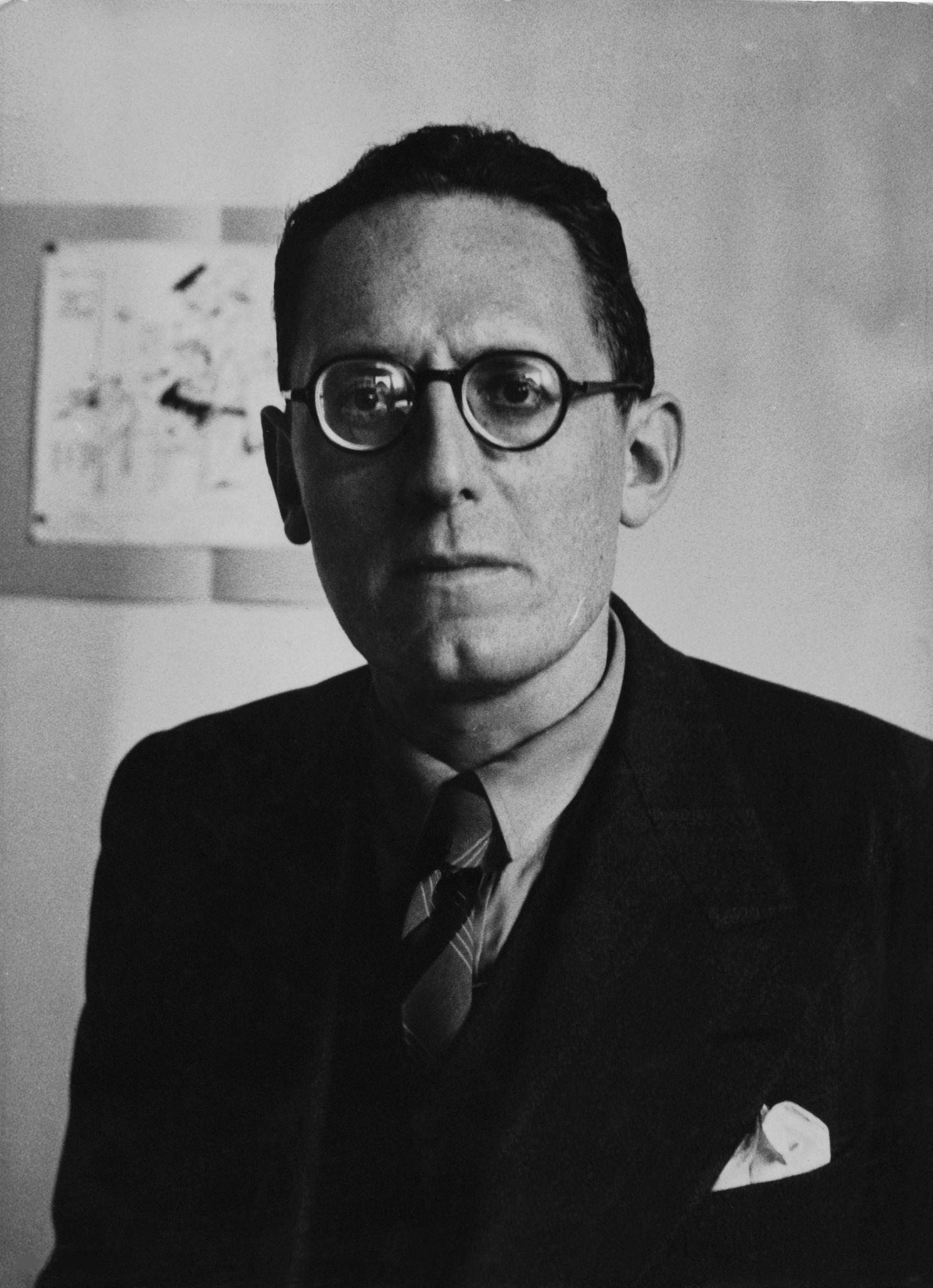
- Schumann, c. 1950

Minister of Foreign Affairs
- In office 22 June 1969 – 15 March 1973
- President: Georges Pompidou
- Prime Minister: Jacques Chaban-Delmas; Pierre Messmer
- Preceded by: Michel Debré
- Succeeded by: André Bettencourt

Personal details
- Born: 10 April 1911 16th arrondissement of Paris, France
- Died: 9 February 1998 (aged 86) Paris, France
- Party: MRP (1944–1967); UDR (1967–1976); RPR (1976–1998)
- Education: Lycée Janson-de-Sailly; Lycée Henri-IV
- Alma mater: Sorbonne

Maurice Schumann (French pronunciation: [mɔʁis ʃuman]; 10 April 1911 – 9 February 1998) was a French politician, journalist, writer, and hero of the Second World War who served as Minister of Foreign Affairs under Georges Pompidou from 22 June 1969 to 15 March 1973. Schumann was a member of the Christian democratic Popular Republican Movement.

The son of an Alsatian Jewish father and Roman Catholic mother, he studied at the Lycée Janson-de-Sailly and the Lycée Henri-IV. He converted to his mother's faith in 1937. He once said of France's fate when suffering the Allied bombing raids, '....and now we are reduced to the most atrocious fate: to be killed without killing back, to be killed by friends without being able to kill our enemies'. During the Second World War he broadcast news reports and commentaries into France on the BBC French Service some 1,000 times in programs such as Honneur et Patrie. He was called by some the "voice of France".

Schumann was subsequently Foreign Minister under the heads of government Jacques Chaban-Delmas and Pierre Messmer. His role in foreign and European policy was often described with the bon mot that he was “the most European of the Gaullists and the most Gaullist of the Europeans” (le plus européen des gaullistes et le plus gaulliste des européens).

During a meeting of the foreign ministers of the European Community in 1969, he stated France's conditions for Britain joining the community on its third application, i.e. questions of agricultural finance had to be settled first. After narrowly losing his constituency to the Socialist candidate in the parliamentary elections in March 1973, he resigned as Foreign Minister.

Schumann died on 9 February 1998 in Paris, aged 86.

Government offices
Preceded by Gaston Palewski	Minister of Scientific Research and Atomic and Space Questions; 1967–1968	Succeeded by Christian de La Malène
Political offices
Preceded by Jean-Marcel Jeanneney	Minister of Social Affairs; 1968–1969	Succeeded by —
Preceded by Michel Debré	Minister of Foreign Affairs; 1969–1973	Succeeded by André Bettencourt
