= Minister of the Armed Forces (France) =

Member of the Government of France

Minister of the Armed Forces and Veterans Affairs
- Ministre des Armées et des Anciens combattants (French)
- Honor flag and naval jack of the minister

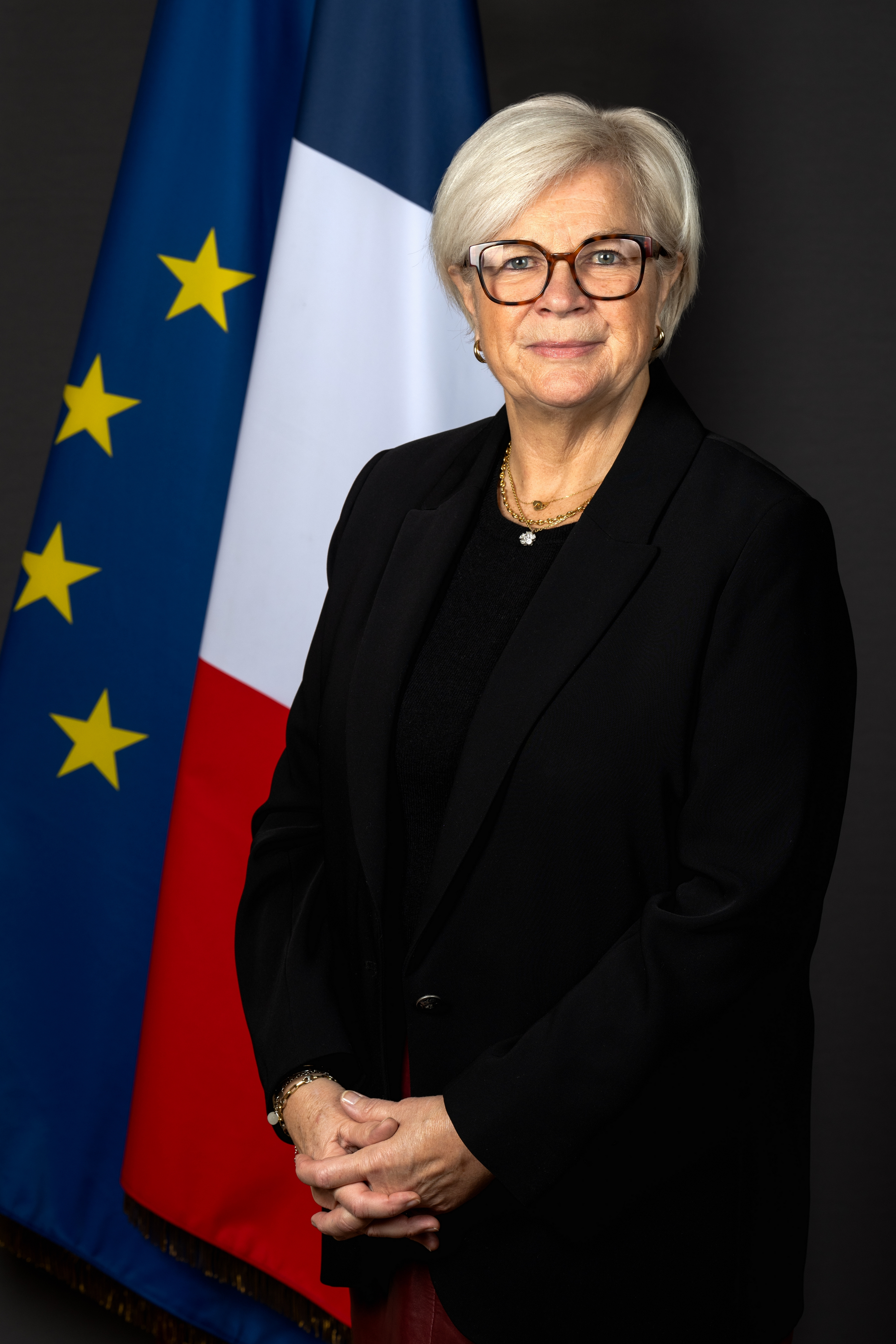
- Incumbent; Catherine Vautrin since 12 October 2025
- Ministry of the Armed Forces
- Member of: Government: Council of Ministers; Council of Defence
- Reports to: President; Prime Minister
- Seat: Hôtel de Brienne, Paris 7^{e}, France
- Nominator: Prime Minister
- Appointer: President
- Term length: No fixed term
- Precursor: Minister of War; Minister of the Navy; Minister of Air
- Formation: 21 November 1945
- First holder: Edmond Michelet
- Deputy: Secretary of State for Veterans; Chief of the Defence Staff
- Salary: 10,135€ per month
- Website: www.defense.gouv.fr

The Minister of the Armed Forces and Veterans Affairs (French: Ministre des Armées et des Anciens combattants, lit. 'Minister of the Armies and Veterans') is the leader and most senior official of the French Ministry of the Armed Forces, tasked with running the French Armed Forces. The minister is the third-highest civilian having authority over France's military, behind the President of the Republic and the Prime Minister. Based on the governments, they may be assisted by a minister or state secretary for veterans' affairs.

The office is considered to be one of the core positions of the Government of France. The previous minister Bruno Le Maire, resigned on 6 October 2025.

== History ==
The minister in charge of the Armed Forces has evolved within the epoque and regimes. The Secretary of State of War was one of the four specialised secretaries of state established in France in 1589. This State Secretary was responsible for the French Army (similarly, the Naval Ministers of France and the Colonies was created in 1669). In 1791, the Secretary of State of War became Minister of War, with this ministerial function being abolished in 1794 and re-established in 1795. Since 1930, the position was often referred to as Minister of War and National Defence. In 1947, two years after World War II, the ministry merged with the Ministry of the Navy and the Ministry of Air (created in 1930), while being headed by a Minister of National Defence responsible for the French Armed Forces, often referred to as Minister of the Armies and since 1947 until 2017, designated as Minister of Defence.

== Powers and functions ==
As the head of the military, the minister is part of the Council of Defence. In addition to their authority over the armed forces, the minister also heads the external and military intelligence community. In this capacity, they are also a member of the National Council of Intelligence.

Although the Minister of the Armed Forces is the official responsible for veterans affairs, they usually delegate their powers to a dedicated subordinate minister or state secretary.

The direct military subordinates of the minister are the:

- Chief of the Defence Staff
- Delegate General for the Armament
- Secretary General for the Administration

== Officeholders ==
=== Provisional Government ===
No.	Portrait	Name	Term			Government	President	Ref.
No.	Portrait	Name	Took office	Left office	Time in office	Government	President	Ref.
Ministry established
Minister of the Armed Forces; (Ministre des Armées)
1		Edmond Michelet	21 November 1945	16 December 1946	1 year, 25 days	de Gaulle II; Gouin; Bidault I	Charles de Gaulle; Félix Gouin; Georges Bidault; Vincent Auriol	
Serving with Minister of National Defence, Charles de Gaulle			21 November 1945	16 December 1946	1 year, 25 days	de Gaulle II; Gouin; Bidault I	Charles de Gaulle; Félix Gouin; Georges Bidault; Vincent Auriol	
Minister of National Defence; (Ministre de la Défense nationale)
2		André Le Troquer	16 December 1946	22 January 1947	37 days	Blum III	Léon Blum	

=== Fourth Republic ===
No.	Portrait	Name	Term			Government	President	Ref.
No.	Portrait	Name	Took office	Left office	Time in office	Government	President	Ref.
Minister of National Defence; (Ministre de la Défense nationale)
3		François Billoux	22 January 1947	4 May 1947	102 days	Ramadier I	Vincent Auriol	
Serving with: War Minister Paul Coste-Floret; Navy Minister Louis Jacquinot; Air Minister André Maroselli			22 January 1947	4 May 1947	102 days	Ramadier I	Vincent Auriol	
Interim by Yvon Delbos, Minister of State, from 4 May 1947 to 22 October 1947.								
Minister of the Armed Forces – Merger of the War, Navy and Air ministries; (Ministre des Forces armées)
4		Pierre-Henri Teitgen	22 October 1947	26 July 1948	278 days	Ramadier II; Schuman I	Vincent Auriol	
Minister of National Defence; (Ministre de la Défense nationale)
5		René Mayer	26 July 1948	11 September 1948	47 days	Marie; Schuman II	Vincent Auriol	
6		Paul Ramadier	11 September 1948	28 October 1949	1 year, 47 days	Queuille I	Vincent Auriol	
7		René Pleven	28 October 1949	12 July 1950	257 days	Bidault II–III; Queuille II	Vincent Auriol	
8		Jules Moch	12 July 1950	11 August 1951	1 year, 30 days	Pleven I; Queuille III	Vincent Auriol	
9		Georges Bidault	11 August 1951	8 March 1952	210 days	Pleven II; Faure I	Vincent Auriol	
10		René Pleven	8 March 1952	19 June 1954	2 years, 103 days	Pinay; Mayer; Laniel I–II	Vincent Auriol	
10		René Pleven	8 March 1952	19 June 1954	2 years, 103 days	Pinay; Mayer; Laniel I–II	René Coty	
Minister of National Defence and the Armed Forces; (Ministre de la Défense nationale et des Forces armées)
11		Pierre Kœnig	19 June 1954	14 August 1954	56 days	Mendès-France	René Coty	
Interim by Emmanuel Temple, Minister of Veterans and War Victims, from 14 August 1954 to 3 September 1954.								
12		Emmanuel Temple	3 September 1954	20 January 1955	139 days	Mendès-France	René Coty	
Minister of the Armed Forces; (Ministre des Armées)
13		Maurice Bourgès-Maunoury	20 January 1955	23 February 1955	34 days	Mendès-France	René Coty	
Serving with Minister of National Defence, Jacques Chevallier				23 February 1955	34 days	Mendès-France	René Coty	
Minister of National Defence and the Armed Forces; (Ministre de la Défense nationale et des Forces armées)
14		Pierre Kœnig	23 February 1955	6 October 1955	225 days	Faure II	René Coty	
15		Pierre Billotte	6 October 1955	1 February 1956	118 days	Faure II	René Coty	
16		Maurice Bourgès-Maunoury	1 February 1956	13 June 1957	1 year, 132 days	Mollet	René Coty	
17		André Morice	13 June 1957	6 November 1957	146 days	Bourgès-Maunoury	René Coty	
18		Jacques Chaban-Delmas	6 November 1957	14 May 1958	189 days	Gaillard	René Coty	
19		Pierre de Chevigné	14 May 1958	1 June 1958	18 days	Pflimlin	René Coty	
Minister of the Armed Forces; (Ministre des Armées)
20		Pierre Guillaumat	1 June 1958	8 January 1959	221 days	de Gaulle III	René Coty	
Serving with Minister of National Defence, Charles de Gaulle			1 June 1958	8 January 1959	221 days	de Gaulle III	René Coty	

=== Fifth Republic ===
No.	Portrait	Name	Term			Government	President	Ref.
No.	Portrait	Name	Took office	Left office	Time in office	Government	President	Ref.
Minister of the Armed Forces; (Ministre des Armées)
21		Pierre Guillaumat	8 January 1959	5 February 1960	1 year, 28 days	Debré	Charles de Gaulle	
22		Pierre Messmer	5 February 1960	22 June 1969	9 years, 137 days	Debré; Pompidou I–II–III–IV; Couve de Murville	Charles de Gaulle	
22		Pierre Messmer	5 February 1960	22 June 1969	9 years, 137 days	Debré; Pompidou I–II–III–IV; Couve de Murville	Interim : Alain Poher	
Minister of National Defence; (Ministre de la Défense nationale)
23		Michel Debré	22 June 1969	5 April 1973	3 years, 287 days	Chaban-Delmas; Messmer I	Georges Pompidou	
Minister of the Armed Forces; (Ministre des Forces armées)
24		Robert Galley	5 April 1973	28 May 1974	1 year, 53 days	Messmer II–III	Georges Pompidou; Alain Poher	
Minister of Defence; (Ministre de la Défense)
25		Jacques Soufflet	28 May 1974	31 January 1975	248 days	Chirac I	Valéry Giscard d'Estaing	
26		Yvon Bourges	31 January 1975	2 October 1980	5 years, 245 days	Chirac I; Barre I–II–III	Valéry Giscard d'Estaing	
27		Joël Le Theule	2 October 1980	22 December 1980	81 days	Barre III	Valéry Giscard d'Estaing	
28		Robert Galley	22 December 1980	22 May 1981	151 days	Barre III	Valéry Giscard d'Estaing	
29		Charles Hernu	22 May 1981	20 September 1985	4 years, 121 days	Mauroy I–II–III; Fabius	François Mitterrand	
30		Paul Quilès	20 September 1985	20 March 1986	181 days	Fabius	François Mitterrand	
31		André Giraud	20 March 1986	12 May 1988	2 years, 53 days	Chirac II	François Mitterrand	
32		Jean-Pierre Chevènement	12 May 1988	29 January 1991	2 years, 262 days	Rocard I–II	François Mitterrand	
33		Pierre Joxe	29 January 1991	9 March 1993	2 years, 39 days	Rocard II; Cresson; Bérégovoy	François Mitterrand	
34		Pierre Bérégovoy	9 March 1993	30 March 1993	21 days	Bérégovoy	François Mitterrand	
35		François Léotard	30 March 1993	18 May 1995	2 years, 49 days	Balladur	François Mitterrand	
36		Charles Millon	18 May 1995	4 June 1997	2 years, 17 days	Juppé I–II	Jacques Chirac	
37		Alain Richard	4 June 1997	7 May 2002	4 years, 337 days	Jospin	Jacques Chirac	
38		Michèle Alliot-Marie	7 May 2002	18 May 2007	5 years, 11 days	Raffarin I–II–III; de Villepin	Jacques Chirac	
39		Hervé Morin	18 May 2007	14 November 2010	3 years, 180 days	Fillon I–II	Nicolas Sarkozy	
Minister of Defence and Veterans; (Ministre de la Défense et des Anciens Combattants)
40		Alain Juppé	14 November 2010	27 February 2011	105 days	Fillon III	Nicolas Sarkozy	
41		Gérard Longuet	27 February 2011	16 May 2012	1 year, 79 days	Fillon III	Nicolas Sarkozy	
Minister of Defence; (Ministre de la Défense)
42		Jean-Yves Le Drian	16 May 2012	17 May 2017	5 years, 1 day	Ayrault I–II; Valls I–II; Cazeneuve	François Hollande	
Minister of the Armed Forces; (Ministre des Armées)
43		Sylvie Goulard	17 May 2017	21 June 2017	35 days	Philippe I	Emmanuel Macron	
44		Florence Parly	21 June 2017	20 May 2022	4 years, 333 days	Philippe II; Castex	Emmanuel Macron	
45		Sébastien Lecornu	20 May 2022	5 October 2025	3 years, 138 days	Borne; Attal; Barnier; Bayrou	Emmanuel Macron	
46		Bruno Le Maire	5 October 2025	6 October 2025	1 day	Lecornu I	Emmanuel Macron	
Interim by Sébastien Lecornu, Prime Minister, from 6 October 2025 to 12 October 2025.								
47		Catherine Vautrin	12 October 2025	Incumbent	357 days	Lecornu II	Emmanuel Macron	

== See also ==
- Secretary of State of the Navy (France)
- Secretary of State for War (France)
- Ministry of War (France)
- Minister of the Navy (France)
- Minister of Air (France)
- Chief of the Defence Staff (France)
  - Major General of the Defence Staff (France)
  - Chief of Staff of the French Army
  - Chief of Staff of the French Air and Space Force
  - Chief of Staff of the French Navy
  - Special Operations Command (France)
  - Directorate General of the National Gendarmerie
