= Yvon Bourges =

French politician (1921–2009)

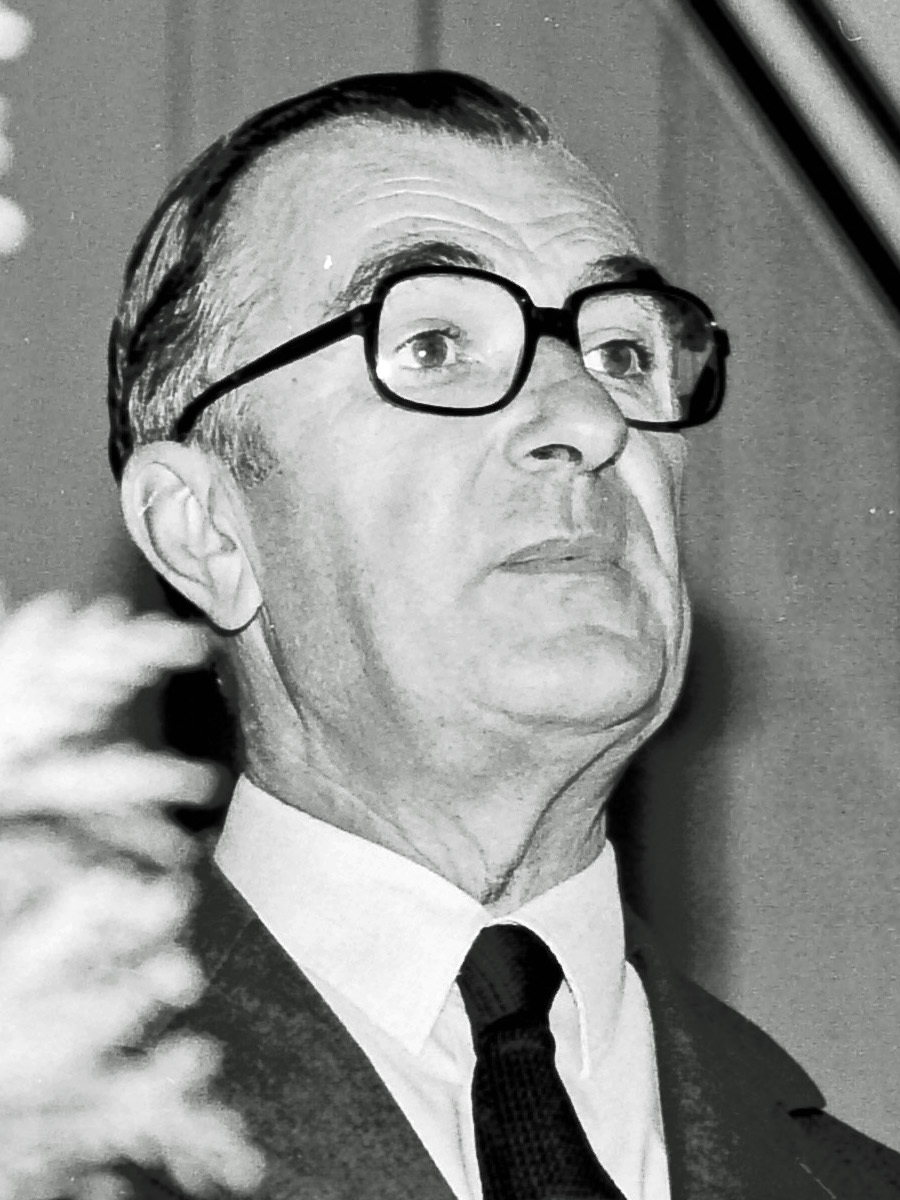
- Yvon Bourges in 1984

Minister of Defence
- In office 31 January 1975 – 2 October 1980
- Prime Minister: Jacques Chirac; Raymond Barre
- Preceded by: Jacques Soufflet
- Succeeded by: Joël Le Theule

Personal details
- Born: 29 June 1921 Pau, France
- Died: 18 April 2009 (aged 87) Paris, France
- Party: UDR
- Education: University of Rennes

Yvon Bourges (French: [ivɔ̃ buʁʒ]; 29 June 1921 – 18 April 2009) was a French politician and colonial administrator. He was the final Governor-General of French Equatorial Africa, serving from 1958 to 1960.

== Biography ==
Born in Pau, Bourges graduated from the law faculty at the University of Rennes.

He became a Gaullist in 1940 in the French Resistance and joined the prefectural administration in 1942, as an assistant to the prefecture of Rennes. He became Chief of Staff of the Somme prefecture two years later, the office of the Prefect of Ille-et-Vilaine Philibert Dupard, then prefect Roger Martin to be decided during the liberation of France. Yvon Bourges then participates in the transition of power and was appointed to posts in Amiens and Strasbourg. At just 25, he became, in 1947, sub-prefect of Erstein.

In 1951, at the request of the High Commissioner Bernard Cornut-Gentille, he joined the administration in French Equatorial Africa (AEF) to prepare colonies for independence. Governor of Upper Volta in 1956, then High Commissioner of the AEF from July 1958 to 1960. He then wrote many articles, including "Tips from colony to his successors" in the newspaper La Roue, an independent body appearing in French Sudan in the years 1950-60.

In 1961, he returned to France at the request of Interior Minister Roger Frey to be appointed the Chief of Staff, a position he has to face the actions of the OAS. He entered politics in 1962 as a deputy of Ille-et-Vilaine and mayor of Dinard until 1967. Charles de Gaulle appointed Bourges in 1965 Secretary of State for Scientific Research, then Secretary of State for Information (1966-1967), the Cooperation (1967-1968) and Foreign Affairs (1968-1969).

After the election of Georges Pompidou, Bourges became the Secretariat for Foreign Affairs until 1972, when he became Minister of Trade and Handicrafts for 9 months. He served under Valéry Giscard d'Estaing in 1975 as defense minister, increasing the budget and modernizing the equipment of the armed forces, notably by adopting the FA-MAS in 1975 and the launch of the nuclear submarine Inflexible. He was under State Secretary General Marcel Bigeard . He left the cabinet to enter the French Senate in 1980.

Bourges was General counsel from 1964 to 1988, he met the head of the municipality of Dinard between 1971 and 1989 and, succeeding Raymond Marcellin, he chaired the Regional Council of Brittany from 1986 to 1998. He was MEP from 1973 to 1975, he chaired the Pan-European Movement from 1993 and published in 1999 "Europe our destiny".

In 1998, he retired from politics. Yvon Bourges was the father of five children. He received the Légion d'honneur in 2008. He died in Paris on 18 April 2009.
