= Joël Le Theule =

French politician (1930–1980)

Minister of Defence
- In office 2 October 1980 – 14 December 1980
- President: Valéry Giscard d'Estaing
- Prime Minister: Raymond Barre
- Preceded by: Yvon Bourges
- Succeeded by: Robert Galley

Personal details
- Born: 22 March 1930 Sablé-sur-Sarthe, France
- Died: 14 December 1980 (aged 50) Saint-Brice, France
- Party: UNR; RPR
- Profession: Teacher

Joël Le Theule (pronounced [ʒɔ.ɛl lə tœl]; 22 March 1930 – 14 December 1980) was a French politician.

== Early life ==
Joël Le Theule was born on March 22, 1930, in Sablé-sur-Sarthe, France.

== Career ==
Le Theule joined the Union for the New Republic and later the Rally for the Republic, two defunct center-right political parties. He served as the mayor of his hometown, Sablé-sur-Sarthe, from 1959 to 1980. He served as a member of the National Assembly from 1958 to 1968, and from 1973 to 1978, representing Sarthe.

He served as the Minister of Overseas Territories from May 31, 1968, to July 12, 1968. He then served as Secretary of State for Information from July 10, 1968, to June 20, 1969. He later was appointed Minister of Transport April 5, 1978, to October 2, 1980. He also served as the Minister of Defence from October 2, 1980, to December 4, 1980.

== Death ==
He died on December 14, 1980, in Saint-Brice, Mayenne.

== Legacy ==
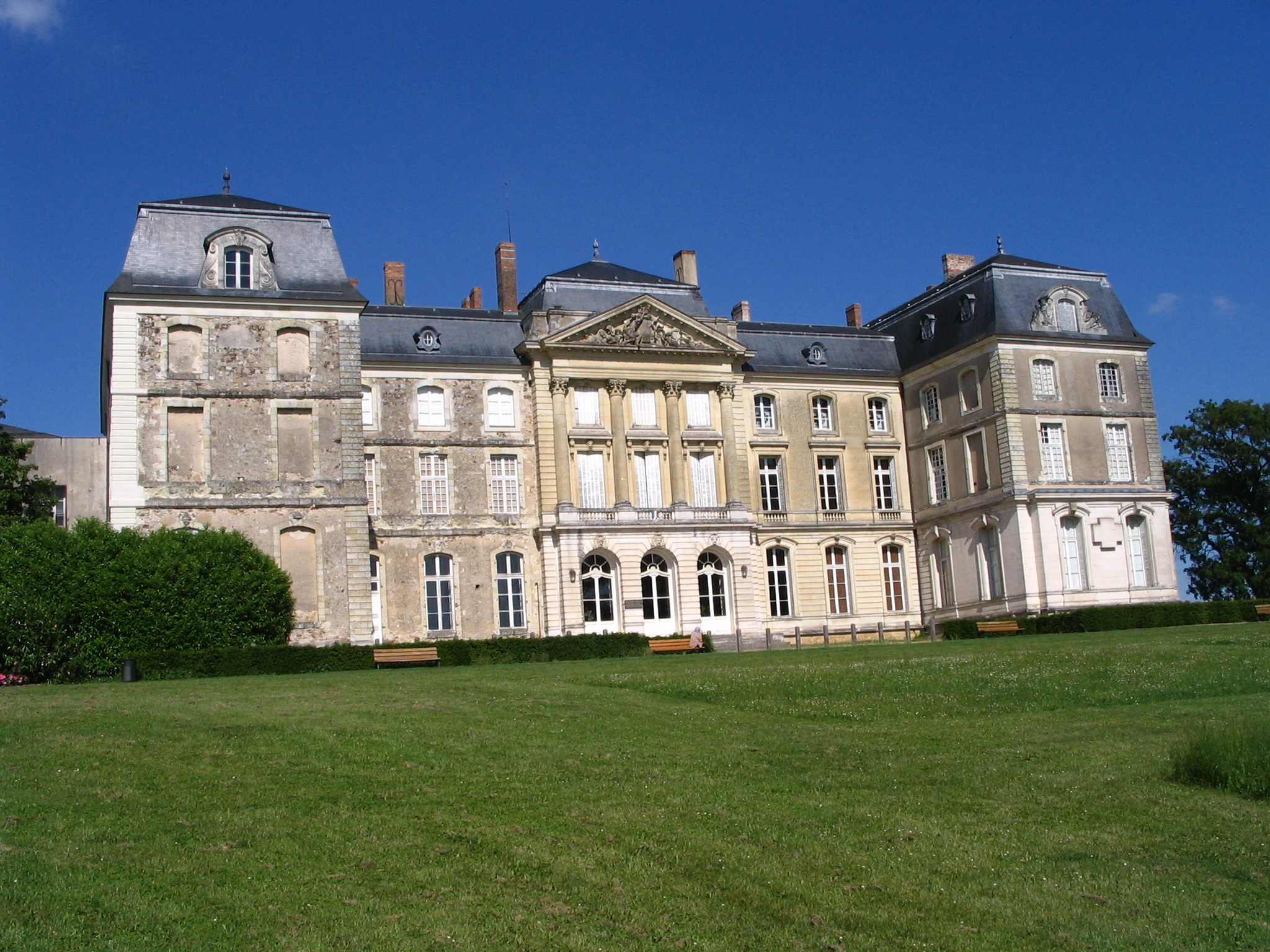
Centre technique de conservation Joël-le-Theule.

The Centre technique de conservation Joël-le-Theule of the Bibliothèque nationale de France in Sablé-sur-Sarthe, located at the Château de Sablé, is named in his honour.
