= Alain Peyrefitte =

French scholar and politician

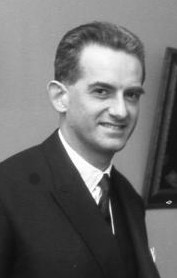
- Peyrefitte in 1964

Minister of Justice
- In office 30 March 1977 – 22 May 1981
- President: Valéry Giscard d'Estaing
- Prime Minister: Raymond Barre
- Preceded by: Olivier Guichard
- Succeeded by: Maurice Faure

Personal details
- Born: 26 August 1925 Najac, France
- Died: 27 November 1999 (aged 74) 16th arrondissement of Paris, France
- Education: École normale supérieure École nationale d'administration

Alain Peyrefitte (French: [alɛ̃ pɛʁfit]; 26 August 1925 – 27 November 1999) was a French scholar and politician. He was a confidant of Charles de Gaulle and had a long career in public service, serving as a diplomat in Germany and Poland. Peyrefitte is remembered for his support for partitioning Algeria amid the Algerian War.

Peyrefitte served as Minister of Information from 1962 to 1966, establishing the rules of presidential debates between the two electoral rounds; and as Minister of Justice from 1977 to 1981, being involved in the affair surrounding the mysterious death of Robert Boulin in 1979.

He became a member of the Académie française in 1977.

On 15 December 1986, he survived an assassination attempt by members of Action Directe (AD) in front of his house. The driver of his car was killed in the bomb attack.

Upon his death in 1999 he was honored by burial in Les Invalides which also houses the tomb of Napoleon and other revered national leaders.

== Books ==
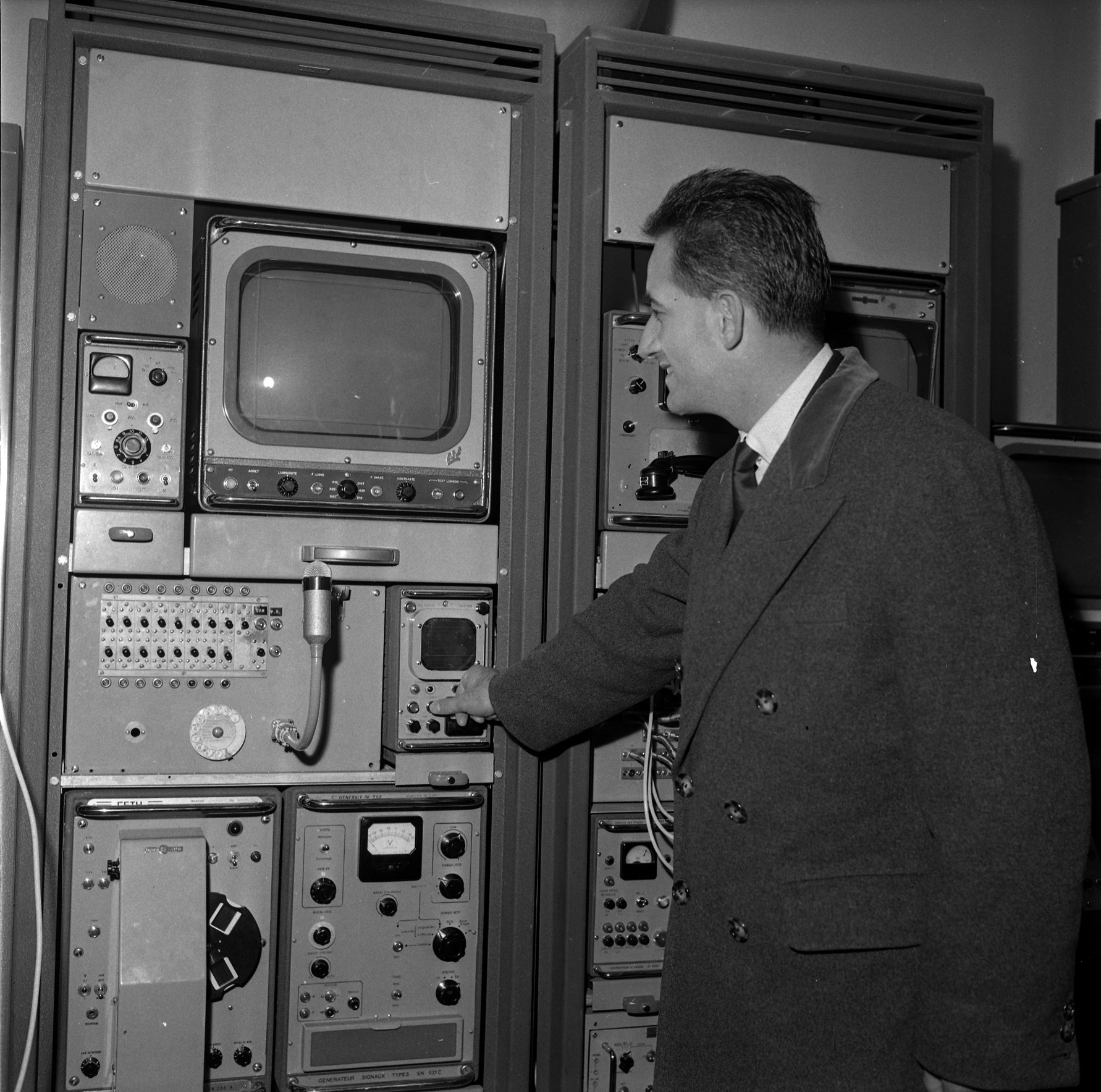
Alain Peyrefitte in 1963

He wrote The Immobile Empire and Quand la Chine s'éveillera… le monde tremblera. Outside France he is probably best known for his book Le Mal français (translated as The Trouble with France), which addresses the question of whether there is something unique to the French character that has caused some of the country's peculiar recurring problems. The book places his own observations and experiences as a journalist and government minister inside a panoramic view of French and European history from the medieval to the modern era.

== Political career ==
Governmental functions

- Secretary of State for Information : April–September 1962.
- Minister of Returnees : September–November 1962.
- Minister of Information : 1962–1966.
- Minister of Scientific Research and Atomic Questions and Space : 1966–1967.
- Minister of Education : 1967–1968.
- Minister for Administrative Reforms : 1973–1974.
- Minister of Cultural Affairs and the Environment : March–May 1974.
- Keeper of the seals, Minister of Justice : 1977–1981.

Electoral mandates

National Assembly of France

- Member of the National Assembly of France for Seine-et-Marne : 1958–1962 (Became secretary of State in 1962)
- Reelected in 1967, but he stays minister
- 1968–1973 (Became minister in 1973)
- 1974–1977 (Became minister in 1977)
- Reelected in 1978, but he stays minister
- 1981–1995 (Became senator in 1995).
- Elected in 1958, reelected in 1962, 1967, 1968, 1973, 1974, 1978, 1981, 1986, 1988, 1993.

Senate of France

- Senator of Seine-et-Marne : 1995–1999 (He died in 1999). Elected in 1995.

General Council

- Vice-president of the General council of Seine-et-Marne : 1982–1988.
- General councillor of Seine-et-Marne : 1964–1988. Reelected in 1970, 1976, 1982.

Municipal Council

- Mayor of Provins : 1965–1997 (Resignation in 1997). Reelected in 1971, 1977, 1983, 1989, 1995.
- Municipal councillor of Provins : 1965–1999 (He died in 1999). Reelected in 1971, 1977, 1983, 1989, 1995.

== Honours ==
- Monaco : Commander of the Order of Cultural Merit (November 1999)
- France : Commandeurs of the Ordre des Arts et des Lettres in September 1974
- France : Chevalier of the Order of Legion of Honour
- France : Commandeur of the Ordre des Palmes académiques
- Grand-Officier of the Order of Merit of the Italian Republic

== Works ==
Non-fiction, except when noted.

- 1946: Rue d'Ulm, chroniques de la vie normalienne.
- 1947: Le Sentiment de confiance
- 1948: Les Roseaux froissés, novel
- 1949: Le Mythe de Pénélope
- 1961: Faut-il partager l'Algérie ?
- 1973: Quand la Chine s'éveillera… le monde tremblera
- 1976: Le Mal français (The Trouble with France)
- 1981: Les Chevaux du lac Ladoga - la justice entre les extrêmes
- 1983: Quand la rose se fanera
- 1985: Encore un effort, Monsieur le Président
- 1989: L'Empire immobile ou le choc des mondes (The Immobile Empire), historic novel
- 1990: La Tragédie chinoise
- 1995: La Société de confiance
- 1995: Du Miracle en économie, lectures at Collège de France
- 1997: La Chine s'est éveillée
- 1994-2000: ''C'était de Gaulle

== See also ==
Peyrefitte Plan (1961)

Political offices
Preceded by Olivier Guichard	Minister of Justice; 1977–1981	Succeeded by Maurice Faure
Preceded by Christian Fouchet	Minister of National Education; 1967–1968	Succeeded by François-Xavier Ortoli
