= André Rossi =

French politician

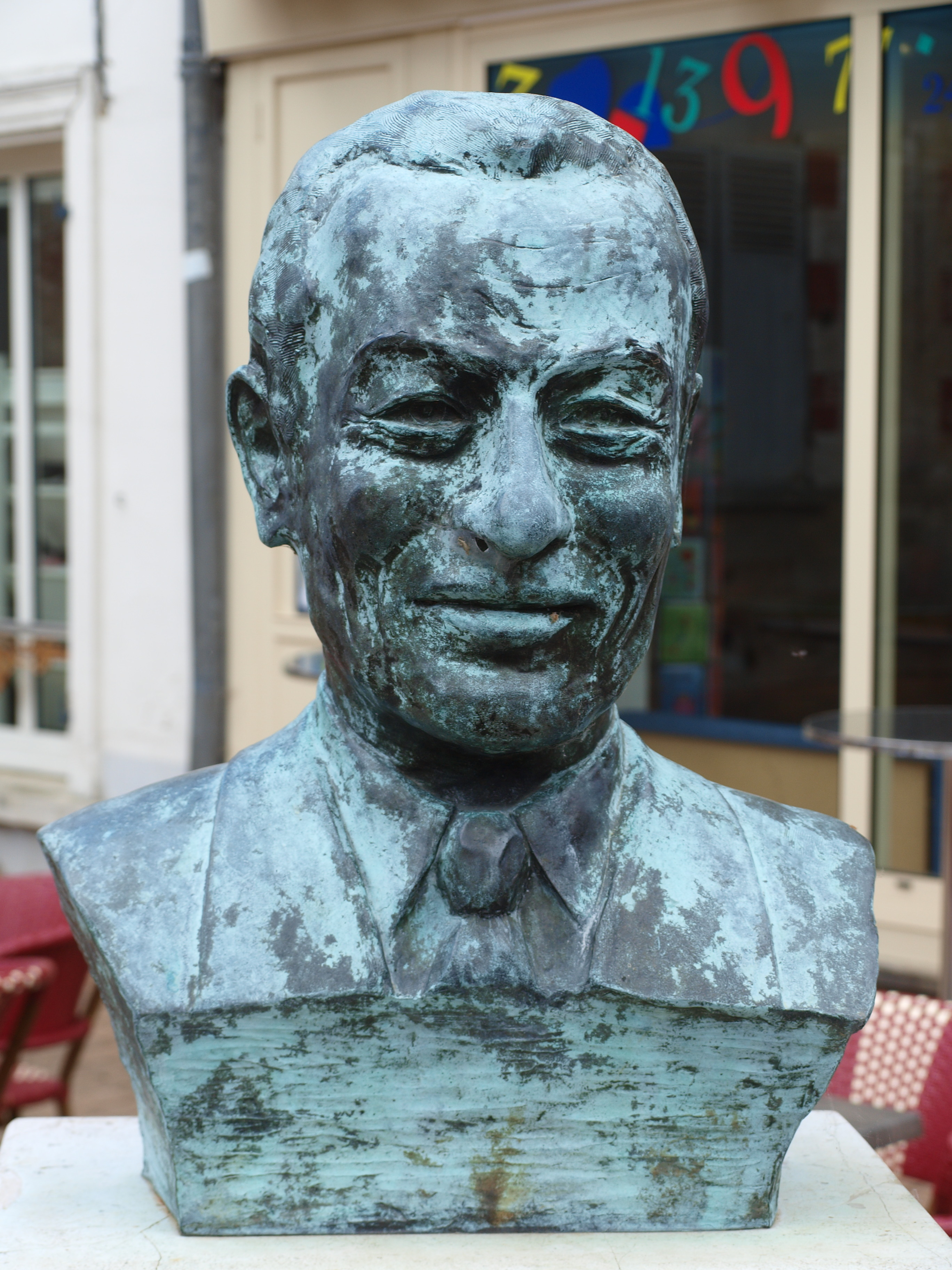

Government spokespeople of France
- In office 1974–1976
- President: Valéry Giscard d'Estaing
- Prime Minister: Jacques Chirac
- Preceded by: Jean-Philippe Lecat
- Succeeded by: Max Gallo

Personal details
- Born: 16 May 1921 Menton, France
- Died: 22 August 1994 (aged 73) Paris, France
- Party: UDF

André Rossi (16 May 1921, Menton – 22 August 1994, Paris) was a French politician. He was France's Minister of Foreign Trade from 25 August 1976 to 31 March 1978, Mayor of Château-Thierry of 1971 to 1989, and Deputy of Aisne from 1958 to 1981, and 1986 to 1994, then Secretary of State, government spokesman from 28 May 1974 to 25 August 1976, before becoming Minister of the Foreign trade.

He was a member of Republican Centre, then a vice-president of Radical Party Valoisien. After his death in 1994, his substitute, Renaud Dutreil succeeded him as deputy.
