= Robert Boulin =

French politician (1920–1979)

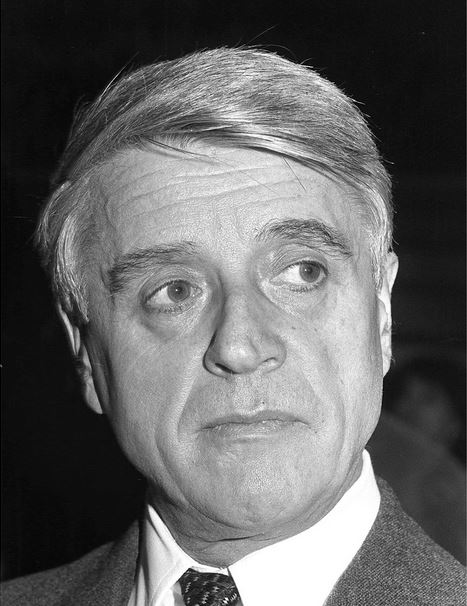
Robert Boulin

Robert Boulin (French: [ʁɔbɛʁ bulɛ̃]; 20 July 1920 – 30 October 1979) was a French politician who served as Minister of Labour in the French Cabinet and was at the centre of a major real-estate scandal that ended only with his death in mysterious circumstances. At the time of his death he was the longest serving minister in post-revolution French history; only Louis XIV's Colbert served longer.

== Career until 1978 ==
Boulin was born in Villandraut, Gironde. A Gaullist who joined the Free French movement in 1940, and rose to lead the movement in Navarre – an achievement for which he was awarded the Croix de Guerre – Boulin was known for his moderation; the courtesy with which he treated his political opponents led to a reputation as a skilled negotiator.

Boulin's first ministerial position was as refugee minister in 1961, when France was winding up the Algerian war preparing to repatriate more than a million French settlers.

Boulin served in the three governments following the establishment of the Fifth Republic in nine different posts; he occupied ministerial posts for fifteen years. His only break in ministerial service came from 1973 to 1976, when he was sidelined for having worked for Chaban-Delmas against Valéry Giscard d'Estaing in the presidential elections.

== Accusations in the Press ==
In 1979, when he was being tipped as a successor to the unpopular Raymond Barre as Prime Minister of France, the satirical and investigative weekly Le Canard enchaîné began to publish a series of articles that it said revealed Boulin had taken undue advantage of his position to obtain favourable terms on a series of real estate deals in the French Riviera.

The paper printed photographs of letters on official ministry letterhead that purported to show that Boulin had tried to get government representatives in the region to authorize construction of 26 houses in an area where buildings were barred for environmental reasons, and that Boulin tried to get Henri Tournet, the property developer at the center of the scandal, promoted to the Legion of Honor.

Further, according to the Le Canard enchaîné, Tournet sold Boulin 5 acres (20,000 m^{2}) near Ramatuelle in 1974 that the developer had already sold to someone else. Boulin said he knew nothing of the dispute until 1978, but a letter quoted by the Canard seemed to indicate that the minister knew beforehand. The paper further claimed that Boulin had paid $8,000 for the land, a third of what the other buyer had paid a year earlier, and was able to get a building permit – within a month, which was unusual – in a wooded area where building had previously not taken place.

== Death and controversy ==
On 29 October 1979, Boulin had lunch with his son Bertrand, and subsequently disappeared. Police found his body on the morning of 30 October in a pond in the forest of Rambouillet. Next to his car, which was parked nearby, was an empty container of barbiturates. In the car were envelopes addressed to Boulin's wife and to his colleagues at the Labor Ministry.

Before the contents of the envelopes were known, top governmental leaders publicly accused Le Canard enchaîné of being morally responsible for Boulin's death, and there were broad hints the government might use the reaction to the Boulin death to seek stricter libel laws, as was done in the 1930s after the suicide of Roger Salengro, the Socialist minister in Léon Blum's Popular Front government, in 1936. Salengro was widely believed to have been hounded by Fascist weeklies.

Jacques Chaban-Delmas, then President of the National Assembly, who had been politically identified with Boulin for many years, told a special memorial session of the assembly that it should "draw the lessons of this tragedy, of this assassination." After meeting with President Valéry Giscard d'Estaing, Prime Minister Barre called for "meditation upon the consequences of certain ignominies", and spoke of "a baseness." The president joined in the criticism: Boulin, said Giscard, "was unable to resist the campaign of harassment he was subjected to. Public opinion should severely condemn any other similar campaigns."

The release of letters found in his car and that he had mailed from a Paris suburb on the day of his death threw fuel on the flames of controversy, as he apparently posthumously accused his fellow Gaullists, especially Justice Minister Alain Peyrefitte of "obvious collusion" with those who were out to destroy him, whom he named as Henri Tournet, an "ambitious" investigating magistrate and "certain political circles from which my own political friends are, alas, not excluded" and implied that the then parliamentary majority was, in Boulin's phrase, "a basket of crabs."

In a separate note to the police, Boulin wrote "I have decided to drown myself in a lake in the forest, of Rambouillet, where I enjoyed riding horseback."

Before his death, Boulin also wrote letters to Agence France-Presse, Le Monde, his wife Collette, and to Chaban-Delmas.

In the version published by Agence France-Presse, he accused a young Normandy judge of leaking details of the real estate case in an effort to seek personal publicity, and attacked the Minister of Justice: "this leaking of the secrets of the investigation failed to move a justice minister more concerned about his career than about the smooth functioning of justice."

Boulin alleged that the judge let the real estate operator go free after serving a month in jail in exchange for his cooperation in implicating the labor minister. The land agent, Henri Tournet, was "blackmailing" Boulin by trying to make it appear, untruthfully, that he knew beforehand that a building lot he bought from him on the French Riviera belonged to someone else, Boulin claimed.

Boulin said that upon being freed from prison, Tournet went to Le Monde and Le Canard enchaîné, "whose basic motivation is maliciousness."

== Investigation ==
Shortly after his death, the Boulin family declared that they did not accept the verdict of suicide and began waging a campaign in the press and the courts to re-open the case, which they believed was murder. On 22 October 1983, his body was ordered to be exhumed for an additional autopsy.

The irregularities of the case were widely covered: that the lake in which he allegedly drowned was apparently nowhere more than 48 centimetres (19 in) deep; that Boulin's face had been badly battered and a cheek bone fractured, which went unmentioned in the official autopsy report; that the local doctor who signed the certificate was only allowed a hurried glimpse of the body which had already been transferred, on orders by high officials, to a waiting helicopter; that the jars containing Mr Boulin's lungs, necessary to confirm a death by drowning, disappeared mysteriously after someone broke into the laboratory fridge.

At a press conference on 17 January 1984, the family accused the Versailles prosecutor of "wanting to hide the real cause of the death of Robert Boulin" and of "shielding the assassins from the law". The family was then prosecuted by the minister for justice for defaming a magistrate, and fined 800 francs; they were pardoned personally by François Mitterrand on his ascension to the Presidency a few weeks later.

In September 1991, the Paris Public Prosecutor announced that he was closing the dossier opened in 1983; the family continued to accuse the Gaullist party of a cover-up, and possible implication in Boulin's death itself. The issue was re-ignited in January 2002 by a series of investigations televised on Canal Plus, in which Juliette Garrat, the doctor who performed the autopsy, said she was now sure that Mr Boulin's death was a "murder disguised as suicide" and the substitute prosecutor at the time also came forward to say "orders were given" by the authorities to stick to the verdict of suicide.

On 21 June 2007, shortly after Jacques Chirac, also a Gaullist, handed over power to Nicolas Sarkozy, the Paris Public Prosecutor met with Boulin's daughter, Fabienne Burgeat, and announced that he was considering re-opening the investigation as "new evidence" had come to light.

In 2025, a new alleged witness came forward from Boulin's home town of Libourne, south-west France. 78-year old Elio Darman claimed he had new evidence; he asked for police protection to ensure he would be able to testify after shots were allegedly fired at him. In April 2026, he was found dead at his home.

== Popular culture ==
Boulin was portrayed by François Berléand in the 2013 TV movie Crime D'Etat (lit. Crime of State) directed by Pierre Aknine.
