= Christian Bonnet =

French politician (1921–2020)

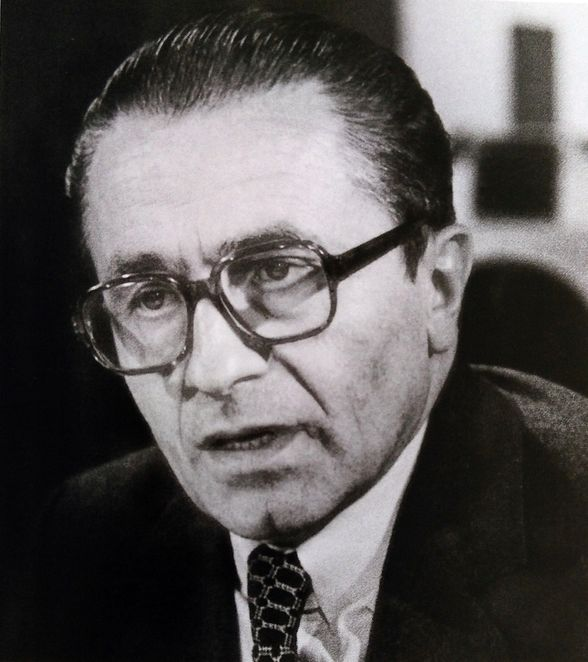

Member of the French National Assembly for Morbihan
- In office 19 January 1956 – 5 December 1958

Member of the French National Assembly for Morbihan's 2nd constituency
- In office 9 December 1958 – 6 July 1972
- Succeeded by: Yvonne Stéphan

General Councillor of the Canton of Belle-Île
- In office 1958–2002
- Preceded by: Ernest Hardouin
- Succeeded by: Yves Brien

Mayor of Carnac
- In office 1964–1996
- Succeeded by: Olivier Buquen

Secretary of State for Housing
- In office 6 July 1972 – 27 May 1974
- Preceded by: Robert-André Vivien
- Succeeded by: Jacques Barrot

Minister of Agriculture
- In office 28 May 1974 – 30 March 1977
- Preceded by: Raymond Marcellin
- Succeeded by: Pierre Méhaignerie

Minister of the Interior
- In office 30 March 1977 – 22 May 1981
- Preceded by: Michel Poniatowski
- Succeeded by: Gaston Defferre

Member of the French National Assembly for the 2nd constituency of Morbihan
- In office 2 July 1981 – 18 December 1983
- Preceded by: Aimé Kergueris
- Succeeded by: Aimé Kergueris

Member of the French Senate for Morbihan
- In office 3 October 1983 – 30 September 2001

Personal details
- Born: 14 June 1921 Paris, France
- Died: 7 April 2020 (aged 98) Vannes, France
- Party: MRP (1956–1962); CD (1962–1967); RI (1967–1978); UDF (1978–1983)
- Occupation: Politician

Christian Bonnet (French: [kʁistjɑ̃ bɔnɛ]; 14 June 1921 – 7 April 2020) was a French politician.

== Biography ==
Christian was the oldest son of Pierre Bonnet and Suzanne Delebecque. He had two younger brothers: Didier and Jean-Claude. His grandfather, Charles Bonnet, married Claire Vaillant de Guélis, related to François-Michel le Tellier, Marquis de Louvois.

He graduated from Sciences Po and earned a doctorate in law. He was a member of the Popular Republican Movement, then of the Independent Republicans, and finally the Union for French Democracy. He was chairman of the supervisory commission of Caisse des Dépôts et Consignations from 1971 to 1972.

He was appointed Minister of the Interior on 30 March 1977, following the resignation of Michel Poniatowski. His notable events in office include the arrest of Jacques Mesrine and the 1980 Paris synagogue bombing.

Christian Bonnet died on 7 April 2020 at the age of 98 in Vannes.
