= Joseph Fontanet =

French politician (1921–1980)

- Born: 9 February 1921; Frontenex, France
- Died: 2 February 1980 (aged 58); Paris, France
- Education: HEC Paris
- Occupation: Politician

Joseph Fontanet (9 February 1921 – 2 February 1980) was an assassinated member of the French Parliament.

He was born in Frontenex, Savoie. He was first elected to Parliament in 1956 as MP for Savoie. In his 17 years in Parliament he held various cabinet positions including Health, Labour and Employment, and Trade and Industry. Whilst Education Minister he was under the government of the 2nd President of the Fifth French Republic, Georges Pompidou, (1969–74), and prime minister Maurice Couve de Murville who had a somewhat fractuous political relationship whilst still in the same party, of the centre-right, the Gaullist Union of Democrats for the Republic, explained by de Gaulle's self-imposed step away from politics in 1968 and relinquishment of leadership, in effect to avoid violent overthrow.

On 1 February 1980 he was shot shortly after midnight in Paris and died the following day. No one has ever been convicted for the murder.

Joseph Fontanet is a graduate of HEC Paris.

Preceded by Olivier Guichard	Minister of National Education of France; 1972–1974	Succeeded by René Haby
