= Jean Chamant =

French judge and politician (1913–2010)

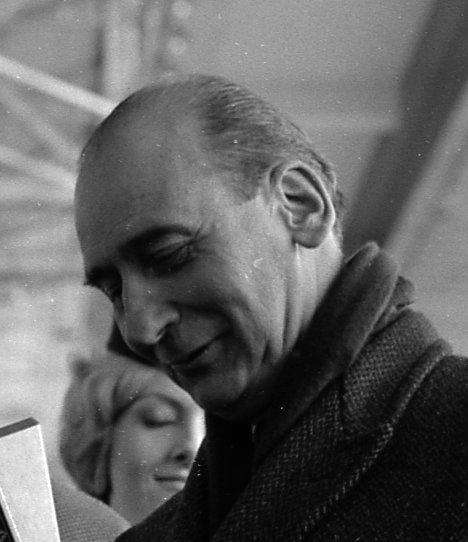
- Born: Jean Jules Eugène Marie Chamant; 23 November 1913; Chagny
- Died: 22 December 2010; 7th arrondissement of Paris
- Occupation: Politician
- Awards: Grand Cross of the Order of Civil Merit (1968)

Jean Chamant (French pronunciation: [ʒɑ̃ ʃamɑ̃]; 23 November 1913 – 22 December 2010) was a French politician, judge and senator who served from 1977 to 1995.

== Career ==
Chamant graduated from the Ecole Saint-Jacques and Faculté de droit de Paris with a degree in law and began his career as a lawyer in 1937. Chamant assumed the title of judge in 1977.

== Death ==
Chamant died in Paris on 22 December 2010 at the age of 97.
