= Olivier Guichard =

French politician

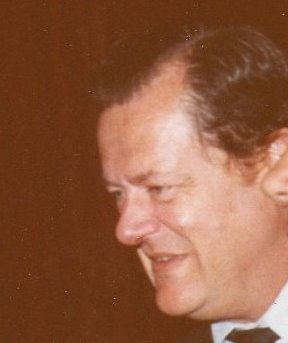
- Olivier Guichard in 1973

Minister of Justice
- In office 27 August 1976 – 30 March 1977
- President: Valéry Giscard d'Estaing
- Prime Minister: Raymond Barre
- Preceded by: Jean Lecanuet
- Succeeded by: Alain Peyrefitte

Minister of National Education
- In office 1969–1972
- President: Georges Pompidou
- Prime Minister: Jacques Chaban-Delmas
- Preceded by: Edgar Faure
- Succeeded by: Joseph Fontanet

President of the Regional Council of Pays de la Loire
- In office 1974–1998
- Preceded by: Vincent Ansquer
- Succeeded by: François Fillon

Personal details
- Born: 27 July 1920 Néac, Gironde, France
- Died: 20 January 2004 (aged 83) 8th arrondissement of Paris, France
- Party: RPR
- Spouse: Daisy de Galard
- Education: Lycée Condorcet
- Alma mater: University of Paris

Olivier Guichard (French pronunciation: [ɔlivje giʃaʁ]; 27 July 1920 – 20 January 2004) was a French politician. He was born in Néac and joined the French Army in 1944 and served until the end of World War II, during which, he earned the Médaille militaire and the Croix de guerre. At the end of his life he also was a Grand Officer of the Legion of Honour.

In 1947, he joined the gaulliste mouvement. He occupied various local elected offices. He has been a member of parliament and several time minister. From 1969 until 1972, he was Minister of National Education. Between 1972 and 1974, he was Minister of Public Works. In a circular dated March 21, 1973, Guichard halted the construction of new large housing estates on greenfield sites and attempted to integrate new buildings more effectively into existing towns. The Habitat et Vie Sociale law (1973-1977) enabled the first redevelopment of large housing estates. And between 1976 and 1977, he was Minister of Justice.

Between 1967 and 1968, he was a member of the Union pour la nouvelle République, then between 1968 and 1978 he was a member of the Union of Democrats for the Republic and finally from 1978 until 1997 he was a member of the Rally for the Republic. He died on 20 January 2004 in Paris, aged 83.

== Political career ==
Governmental functions

Minister of Industry : 1967–1968.

Minister of Planning and Land Management : 1968–1969.

Minister of National Education : 1969–1972.

Minister of Equipment, Housing and Tourism : 1972–1974.

Minister of State, minister of Land Management, Equipment and Transports : March–May 1974.

Minister of State, Keeper of the Seals : 1976–1977.

Electoral mandates

National Assembly of France

Member of the National Assembly of France for Loire-Atlantique : Elected in 1967, but he became minister / Reelected in 1968, but he stays minister / Reelected in 1973, but he stays minister / 1974–1976 (Became minister) / 1978–1997. Elected in 1967, reelected in 1968, 1973, 1978, 1981, 1986, 1988, 1993.

Regional Council

President of the Regional Council of Pays de la Loire : 1974–1998. Elected in 1986, reelected in 1992.

Regional councillor of Pays de la Loire : 1974–1998. Elected in 1986, reelected in 1992.

General Council

General councillor of Loire-Atlantique : 1970–1982. Reelected in 1976.

Municipal Council

Mayor of Néac : 1962–1971. Reelected in 1965.

Municipal councillor of Néac : 1962–1971. Reelected in 1965.

Mayor of La Baule-Escoublac : 1971–1995. Reelected in 1977, 1983, 1989.

Municipal councillor of La Baule-Escoublac : 1971–1995. Reelected in 1977, 1983, 1989.

Political offices
Preceded by Edgar Faure	Minister of National Education of France; 1969–1972	Succeeded by Joseph Fontanet
