= Louis Joxe =

French statesman, judge, and politician

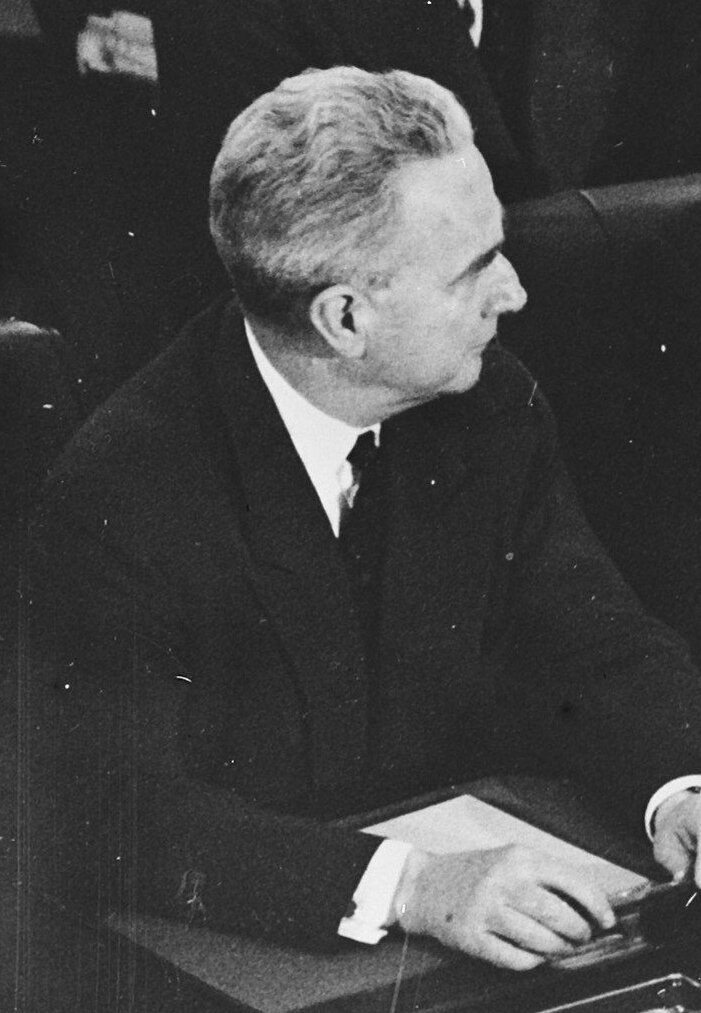

Member of the Constitutional Council
- In office 4 November 1977 – 28 February 1989
- Appointed by: Edgar Faure; Jacques Chaban-Delmas
- President: Roger Frey; Daniel Mayer; Robert Badinter
- Preceded by: Henri Rey
- Succeeded by: Jacques Robert

Minister of Justice
- In office 7 April 1967 – 31 May 1968
- President: Charles de Gaulle
- Prime Minister: Georges Pompidou
- Preceded by: Jean Foyer
- Succeeded by: René Capitant

Personal details
- Born: 16 September 1901 Bourg-la-Reine, France
- Died: 6 April 1991 (aged 89) Paris, France
- Party: UDR
- Children: Alain Joxe; Pierre Joxe

Louis Joxe (16 September 1901 – 6 April 1991) was a French statesman, judge, and politician. He was born in Bourg-la-Reine, Hauts-de-Seine.

== Career ==
Joxe, along with René Capitant, the resistance organization Combat-Algérie, the only branch of Combat outside of metropolitan France.

- Ambassador of France to the USSR (1952–1955)
- Ambassador of France to the Federal Republic of Germany (-July 1956)
- Secretary General
- Minister of National Education (from 15 January 1960 to 23 November 1960 and from 15 October 1962 to 28 November 1962)
- Minister of Algerian Affairs (1960–1962) - signed the Évian Accords
- Minister of Administrative Reforms (1962–1967)
- Minister of Justice (6 April 1967 to 30 May 1968)
- Deputy of Rhône (1967–1977)
- Judge of the Constitutional Council of France

== Personal life ==
He was married to Françoise-Hélène Halévy and was the father of the politician Pierre Joxe. Louis Joxe died in 1991, aged 89, in Paris.

Political offices
Preceded by Michel Debré	Minister of National Education; 1960	Succeeded by Pierre Guillaumat
Preceded by Pierre Sudreau	Minister of National Education; 1962	Succeeded by Christian Fouchet
Preceded by Jean Foyer	Minister of Justice; 1967–1968	Succeeded by René Capitant
Legal offices
Preceded by Henri Rey	Member of the Constitutional Council; 1977–1989	Succeeded by Jacques Robert
