= Synagogue of Neuilly =

Historic Orthodox synagogue in Paris, France

- French: Synagogue de Neuilly
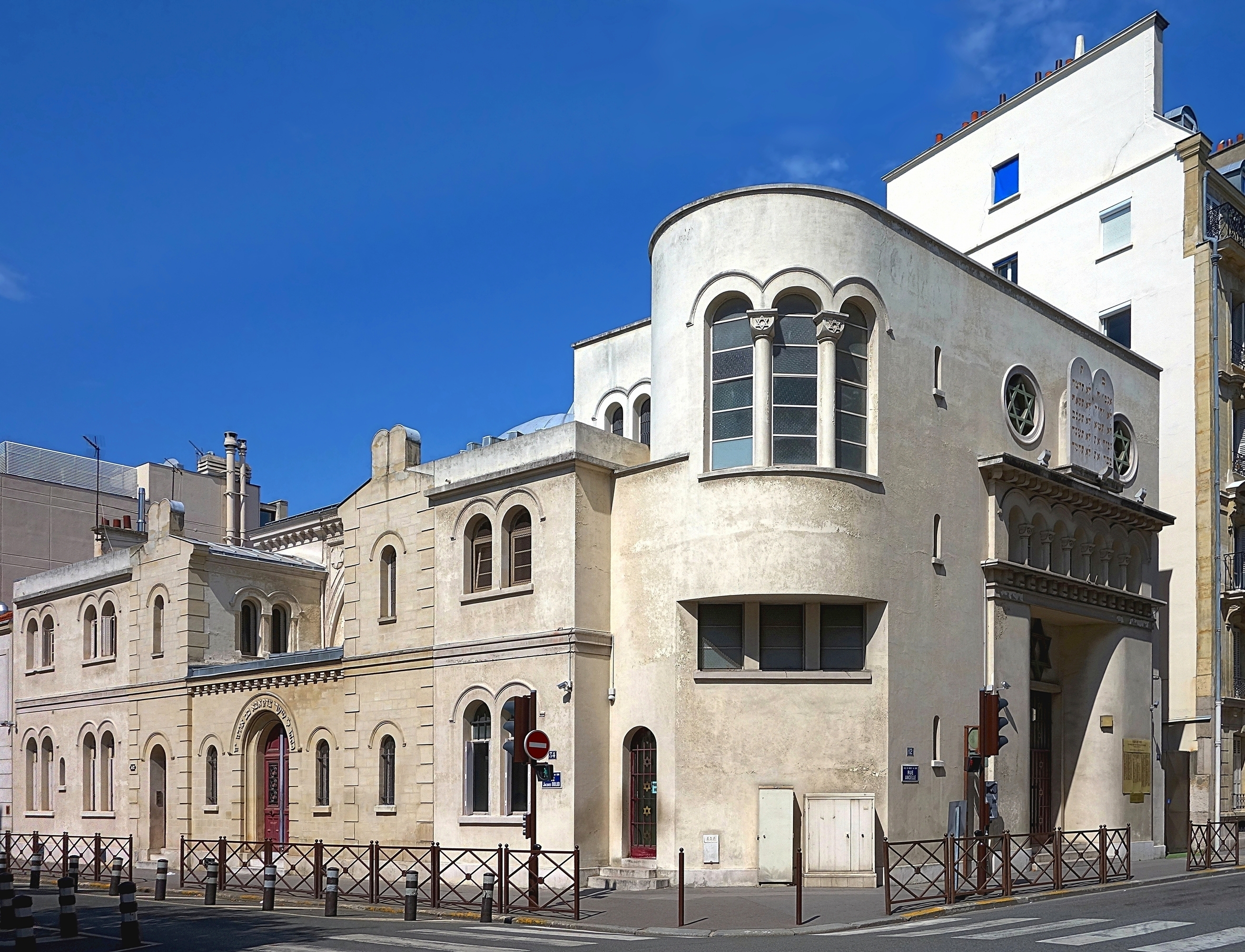
- The synagogue in 2013

- Location of the synagogue on the outskirts of Paris

Religion
- Affiliation: Orthodox Judaism
- Rite: Nusach Ashkenaz (former); Nusach Sefard (current)
- Ecclesiastical or organizational status: Synagogue
- Leadership: Rabbi Michael Azoulay
- Status: Active

Location
- Location: 12 rue Ancelle, Neuilly-sur-Seine, Hauts-de-Seine
- Country: France
- Interactive map of Synagogue of Neuilly
- Coordinates: 48°52′51″N 2°16′06″E

Architecture
- Architects: 1878: Emile Uhlmann; 1937: Germain Debré; Julien Hirsch
- Type: Synagogue architecture
- Style: Byzantine Revival
- Established: 1869 (as a congregation)
- Completed: 1878

Website
- synaneuilly.com

Monument historique
- Official name: Synagogue
- Type: Base Mérimée
- Criteria: Patrimoine architectural
- Designated: April 22, 1993
- Reference no.: IA00079692

The Synagogue of Neuilly (French: Synagogue de Neuilly) is an Orthodox Jewish congregation and synagogue, located at 12 rue Ancelle, in Neuilly-sur-Seine, in the Hauts-de-Seine department, west of Paris, France. The synagogue was built in 1878. The congregation used to worship in the Ashkenazi rite; however is now Sephardi.

The building was listed as a monument historique on April 22, 1993.

== History ==
The first significant evidence of a Jewish presence in Neuilly is the "house of refuge for Jewish children", a home created in 1866 by Coralie Cahen the house also hosted prostitutes and their children. Initially located at Romainville then Neuilly Boulevard Eugene (now Boulevard Victor Hugo), it moved in 1883 to 19, Boulevard de la Saussaye where it stayed until the 1980s. Better known by the abbreviated name of "Refuge," it housed many young Jews isolated, without family, after the Second World War and after the independence of Algeria, and the subsequent massmigration of Jews to France.

By 1869, there was a community located in an apartment at 15 rue Louis-Philippe. Chairman, Godchaux Oulry, a native of Lorraine, succeeded in raising the funds necessary to build a synagogue. Designed by Emile Uhlmann in the Byzantine Revival style, the opening of the synagogue took place in 1878.

The first rabbi of Neuilly in 1888, was Simon Debré, father of Professor Robert Debré and the grandfather of the General de Gaulle's Prime-Minister Michel Debré.

The community grew until World War II and the synagogue expanded in 1937 under the eye of architects Germain Debré and Hirsch.

As it was for all Jewish communities, the war brought desolation. Rabbi Robert Meyers and his wife Suzanne (née Bauer) were deported to Auschwitz in 1943. A plaque outside the synagogue commemorates the deportation of all Jewish inhabitants of Neuilly and others, and the actions of the Righteous Among the Nations in Neuilly. On Rue Edouard Nortier, another plaque commemorates the names of 17 children aged 3 to 11 years, who were housed in a former clinic run by the Nuns, they were on July 25, 1944, rounded up, deported and murdered by the Nazis.

The rebirth after the war was difficult. Rabbi David Feuerwerker created a study circle and a circle of young people. His successor, Rabbi Edouard Gourevitch, saw the arrival in 1962 of huge number of Jews from Algeria who brought a new vitality to the community. In 1975, the Grand Rabbi Jerome Cahen and his wife revived the community, turning resolutely towards youth. The number of believers increased dramatically. In 1978, the centenary of the synagogue was celebrated in the presence of the authorities and former Prime Minister Debré. In 2009, Rabbi Michael Azoulay, a member of the National Consultative Ethics Committee since 2008, succeeded Rabbi Alexis Blum.

== Clergy ==
The following individuals have served as rabbi of the congregation:

Ordinal	Officeholder	Term started	Term ended	Time in office	Notes
1	Simon Debré	1888	1939	50–51 years	
2	Robert Meyers	1928	1943	14–15 years	Served concurrently with Rabbi Debré; perished in Auschwitz
3	Henry Soil	1945	1946	0–1 years	
4	David Feuerwerker	1946	1948	1–2 years	
5	René Kapel	1948	1949	0–1 years	
6	Edouard Gourevitch	1949	1975	25–26 years	
7	Jerome Cahen	1975	1986	10–11 years	Died in office
8	Alexis Blum	1988	2009	20–21 years	
9	Michael Azoulay	2009	incumbent	16–17 years	
