= François Debré =

French writer and journalist (1942–2020)

- Born: 3 April 1942; Toulouse, France
- Died: 14 September 2020 (aged 78); Montlouis-sur-Loire, France
- Education: INALCO
- Occupations: Writer; Journalist
- Parent: Michel Debré
- Relatives: Bernard Debré, Jean-Louis Debré (brothers)

François Debré (3 April 1942 – 14 September 2020) was a French writer and journalist. Winner of the Albert Londres Prize in 1977, he was a member of the Société des gens de lettres.

== Biography ==
The second son of Prime Minister Michel Debré and his wife, Anne-Marie Lemaresquier, François was also the brother of Vincent, Jean-Louis, and Bernard. Additionally, he was the grandson of Robert Debré and the nephew of Olivier Debré.

After studying law and eastern languages, he joined the magazine Afrique contemporaine in 1966 before becoming a freelance journalist in 1968. Between 1968 and 1977, he covered numerous conflicts around the world. He worked in Biafra for Le Monde, and in Cambodia and Vietnam for L'Obs and Le Point. In 1968, he won the Prix de la critique indépendante for his essay on the Nigerian Civil War.

Debré was regarded as one of the most talented reporters of his generation. In the early 1970s, he worked on numerous reports for TF1, Antenne 2, and France Régions 3 in Chad, Ivory Coast, Uganda, and Pakistan. He joined TF1's foreign policy service in 1977. He was a major reporter for the channel until 1985. He covered several major events, such as the Yom Kippur War, the start of Solidarity in Poland, and the dismissal of Jean-Bédel Bokassa in the Central African Republic.

In 1977, he won the Prix Albert-Londres for his essay on the Khmer Rouge, titled Cambodge, la révolution de la forêt. He returned from South-East Asia with an opiate addiction. In 1988, he directed magazines for Antenne 2, where he was appointed deputy editor-in-chief. On 16 December 2011, Debré was given a two-month suspended sentence for his involvement in Jacques Chirac's scheme to raise money for his presidential run while serving as Mayor of Paris.

Debré was married to Maylis Ybarnegaray, daughter of Jean Ybarnégaray, with whom he had two daughters: the novelist Constance Debré and the journalist at Le Monde Ondine. He died following a long illness in Montlouis-sur-Loire on 14 September 2020 at the age of 78, one day after the death of his brother, Bernard.

== Works ==
=== Feature films ===
- Éthiopie, les dernières années du Negus
- Le Petit Livre rouge
- Les Chinois de la diaspora
- La Remontée du Mekong
- Les Trottoirs de Manille
- La Quadrature des cercles
- Les Narcotiques anonymes

=== Screenwriting ===
- L'Amiral aux pieds nus
- La Ballade de Menardeau
- L'Homme de pouvoir
- Possession vaut titre

=== Publications ===
- La Vingt-et-unième Chinoise (1968)
- Biafra an II (1968)
- Premier crime (1975)
- Les Chinois de la diaspora (1976)
- Cambodge, la révolution de la forêt (1977)
- Le Livre des égarés (1979)
- Les Fêtes d'automne (1983)
- Trente ans avec sursis (1998)
- Le Livre des Égarés (2019)

== Awards ==
- Prix de la critique indépendante for Biafra an II (1968)
- Prix Albert-Londres for Cambodge, la révolution de la forêt (1977)
- Grand prix du festival international de Monte-Carlo for Les Trottoirs de Manille (1981)
