= Constance Debré =

French lawyer and novelist

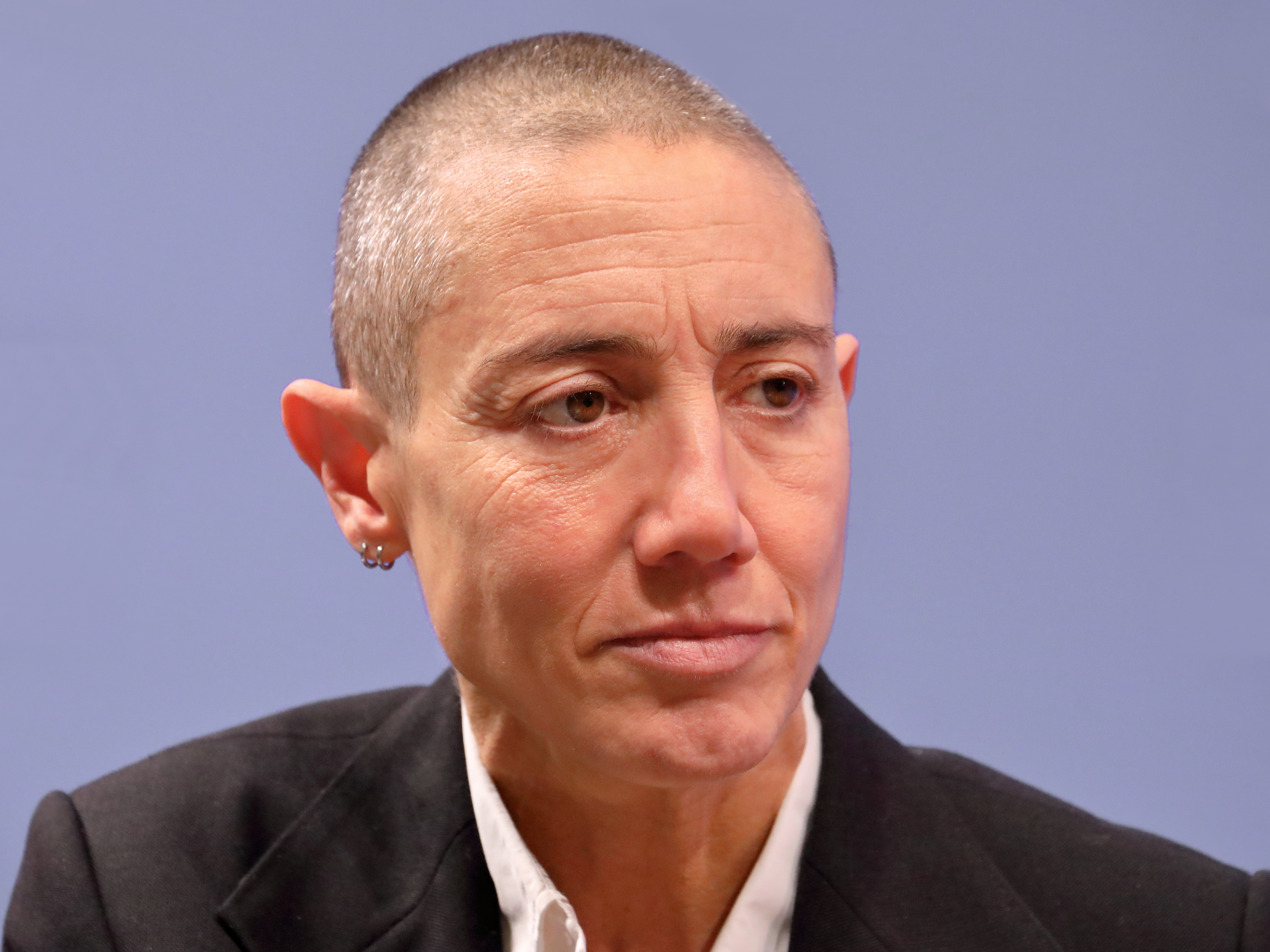
- Constance Debré in 2025.
- Born: 1972 (age 53–54)
- Occupation: Novelist

Constance Debré, born in 1972, is a French lawyer and novelist.

== Biography ==
Constance Debré's parents were journalist François Debré (1942–2020) and former model Maylis Ybarnégaray (1942–1988); the judge and politician Jean-Louis Debré is her uncle. Her grandparents included Michel Debré (1912–1996), former Prime Minister under General de Gaulle, and Jean Ybarnégaray (1883–1956), a minister of the Vichy regime and resistance fighter.

She was 16 when her mother died. She studied at Lycée Henri-IV, then law at Panthéon-Assas University. She is also a graduate of class 99 (E99) of the ESSEC Business School. She married in 1993 and had a son in 2008.

Working as a defence lawyer, she accompanied her father in 2011 when he was charged in an inquiry into fictitious jobs at the town hall of Paris. In 2013, she was elected second secretary of the Conference of Lawyers of the Paris Bar.

In 2015, she left her husband and her job to live with a woman and pursue a full-time career as a writer. In 2018, she won the Prix La Coupole for her autobiographical novel Play Boy, which describes the aftermath of this fateful decision: the custody battle over her son, and its associated pressures to conform to a "bourgeois" family model with a same-sex partner. It formed the first book in a trilogy.

Her 2020 novel Love Me Tender was adapted by filmmaker Anna Cazenave Cambet into the 2025 film Love Me Tender.

== Books ==
- Un peu là, beaucoup ailleurs, Monaco-Paris, France, Le Rocher, 2004, ISBN 2-268-05191-9, Prix Contrepoint, 2005
- Manuel pratique de l'idéal. Abécédaire de survie, Monaco-Paris, France, Le Rocher, 2007, ISBN 978-2-268-06130-6
- Play Boy, Paris, Éditions Stock, 2018, ISBN 978-2-234-08429-2
  - Translated into English by Holly James as Playboy, 2024, ISBN 9781635902105
- Love me tender, Paris, Éditions Flammarion, 2020, ISBN 978-2-08-147173-3
  - Translated into English by Holly James, 2023, ISBN 9781800814837
- Nom, Paris, Éditions Flammarion, 2022, ISBN 978-2-08-151593-2
- Offenses, Paris, Éditions Flammarion, 2023, ISBN 978-2-08-028614-7
