= Pierre Sudreau =

French politician

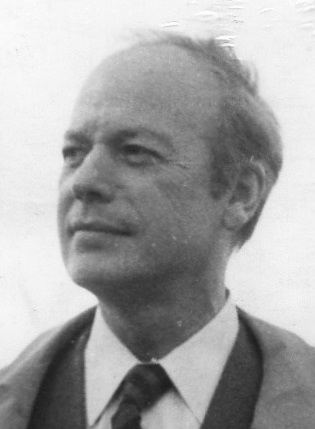

Minister for Building Works Ministre de la Construction
- In office 1 June 1958 – 15 April 1962
- President: René Coty; Charles de Gaulle
- Prime Minister: Charles de Gaulle; Michel Debré

Education Minister Ministre de l'Éducation Nationale
- In office 15 April 1962 – 15 October 1962
- President: Charles de Gaulle
- Prime Minister: Georges Pompidou
- Preceded by: Lucien Paye
- Succeeded by: Louis Joxe

Member of the French National Assembly for Loir-et-Cher
- In office 1967–1981

President of Loir-et-Cher
- In office 1967–1981

Mayor of Blois
- In office 1971–1989
- Succeeded by: Jack Lang

Personal details
- Born: 13 May 1919 Paris, France
- Died: 22 January 2012 (aged 92) Paris, France
- Party: Independent
- Other political affiliations: allied with Democratic Centre, PDM, Reformist Movement, UDF
- Spouse: Francette Brun Sudreau
- Children: Jean Sudreau (deceased); Anne Sudreau O'Connor (deceased); Bernard Sudreau
- Parent(s): Jean Sudreau; Marie-Marguerite Boyer Sudreau

Pierre Sudreau (13 May 1919 – 22 January 2012) was a French politician. He served as minister of Construction (1958–1962), minister of Education (1962), member of the French National Assembly (1967–1981) and mayor of Blois (1971–1989).

His childhood correspondence with Antoine de Saint-Exupéry helped inspire the title character of the 1943 novel The Little Prince. During the German occupation of France in World War II, Sudreau was a resistance fighter in the Brutus Network. He was imprisoned in the Buchenwald concentration camp.

After the war, he made a rapid career in civil service and was responsible for the planning of major construction and infrastructure projects during General de Gaulle's government. A convinced pro-European, he presided European Movement France from 1962 to 1968. He was also a lobbyist for the French railway industry and chaired its association FIF from 1963 to 1996.

== Biography ==
Sudreau was born in Paris, the son of businessman Jean Sudreau and Marie-Marguerite (née Boyer) Sudreau. Sudreau studied law and history at the University of Paris (Sorbonne). He was preparing for the agrégation (state examination for high school teachers) in history but was prevented from taking it by the outbreak of the Second World War. While training as a fighter pilot at the École de l'air in Bordeaux-Mérignac, France fell to the German Wehrmacht and was forced to surrender in June 1940. Unlike some of his fellow students, he did not flee to England for family reasons (he had just married and had become the father of a child). Instead, he stayed in the so-called free zone in the south of France and served as an officer in the air force of the Vichy regime.

Returning to France in May 1945, Sudreau was promoted by de Gaulle and made a career in civil service. He was appointed subprefect, then subdirector at the ministry of the Interior. From 1951 to 1955, he served as prefect of the Central French department of Loir-et-Cher whose seat is in Blois. At the time, he was the youngest prefect of any French department. He then took the post of Commissioner for Construction and Urban Planning in the Paris region where he oversaw projects like the construction of large "functional" complexes, the commencement of the RER suburban rail, the Boulevard Périphérique ring road, and the launch of the La Défense business district in western Paris.

When de Gaulle returned to power as Prime minister in June 1958, he appointed Sudreau to the newly created office as minister of Construction, a position he also retained after the founding of the Fifth Republic under de Gaulle as President of the Republic. In Georges Pompidou's first premiership, Sudreau became minister of Education in April 1962. He resigned from this post in October 1962 in protest against a proposal by Charles de Gaulle to amend the constitution, introducing direct presidential elections.

In 1985, Sudreau sat on the "Jury of Honor" that assessed whatever the film Des terroristes à la retraite should be aired in France or not. Sudreau referred to the recent Palestinian bombings of American and Israeli targets and stated: "at the very moment when we are again talking about direct action, this broadcast legitimizes terrorist methods.” The "Jury of Honor" in its report stated “though it is highly desirable that a film inform French of all generations about the saga of the FTP-MOI, such a film nevertheless still remains to be made”.

== Personal life ==
He was married to France Brun; they had three children: Jean Sudreau (predeceased), Anne Sudreau O'Connor (predeceased), and Bernard Sudreau. His son Jean died of lung cancer and was married to Danièle Louis-Dreyfus, daughter of French Resistance fighter and businessman Pierre Louis-Dreyfus.

== Publications ==
- 1967 L'enchaînement (Plon)
- 1980 La stratégie de l'absurde (Plon)
- 1985 De l'inertie politique (éditions Stock)
- 1991 Au-delà de toutes les frontières

=== Bibliography ===
- Christiane Rimbaud, Pierre Sudreau, Le Cherche Midi, 2004

== Books ==
- Bowles, Brett (2011). "Historiography, Memory, and the Politics of Form in Mosco Boucault's Terrorists in Retirement". In Sandra Ott (ed.). War, Exile, Justice, and Everyday Life, 1936–1946. Reno: University of Nevada. pp. 191–224. ISBN 978-1-935709-09-1.

Political offices
Preceded by Lucien Paye	Minister of National Education; 1962	Succeeded by Louis Joxe
