= Edouard Lizop =

French activist (1917–1995)

Edouard Lizop (1917-1995) was a French activist in French Catholicism.

== Activities ==
Lizop was the creator of Secrétariat D'études pour la liberté de l'enseignement et la défense de la culture.

Pressure by Lizop and his followers forced Michel Debré to change the original wording of the school law so that teachers in Catholic schools can explain in class their own conceptions of God and the world.
