= Jacques Robert =

Jacques Robert may refer to:

- Jacques Robert (jurist) (born 1928), French jurist and university president
- Jacques Robert (film director) (1890–1928), Swiss silent actor and film director
- Jacques Robert (writer) (1921–1997), French author, screenwriter and journalist
