= Love Me Tender (2025 film) =

2025 French drama film

- Promotional release poster
- Directed by: Anna Cazenave Cambet
- Written by: Anna Cazenave Cambet
- Based on: Love Me Tender by Constance Debré
- Produced by: Raphaëlle Delauche; Nicolas Sanfaute
- Starring: Vicky Krieps; Antoine Reinartz; Viggo Ferreira-Redier; Monia Chokri
- Cinematography: Kristy Baboul
- Edited by: Joris Laquittant
- Music by: Maxence Dussère
- Production company: Novoprod
- Release date: 20 May 2025 (Cannes)
- Running time: 134 minutes
- Country: France
- Language: French

Love Me Tender is a 2025 French drama film written and directed by Anna Cazenave Cambet, based on the 2020 novel by Constance Debré. It stars Vicky Krieps as Clémence, a mother fighting her ex-husband for custody of their son after she starts dating a woman.

The film had its world premiere at the Un Certain Regard section of the 78th Cannes Film Festival on 20 May 2025, where it was also nominated for the Queer Palm.

== Synopsis ==
Clémence, a woman who has been separated for several years from her husband Laurent, shares joint custody of their son Paul. The two maintain a functional co-partenting relationship until Clémence opens up about being attracted to women and starting a relationship with Sarah. This causes a shift in their relationship and tensions gradually escalate between them, leading to a breakdown in communication and an intensification of the custody conflict over Paul.

As the situation deteriorates, Laurent seeks to exclude Clémence from their son’s life, culminating in a shift in custody arrangements in his favor. In parallel, Clémence navigates significant personal and professional changes, including leaving her career as a lawyer to become a freelance writer, through which she reflects on motherhood, femininity, and personal integrity.

== Reception ==
On Rotten Tomatoes, the audience score is limited, with an 87% rating based on 15 reviews. Writing for Variety, Jessica Kiang described it as a tender film that reimagines an elegant and moving portrait of motherhood at odds with selfhood.

Screened as part of the 2025 London Film Festival and reviewed by Film Carnage, the film was described as “a slow-burn story of suffering and patience, of one woman facing a spiteful partner…” Emma Kiely for Collider also praised Vicky Krieps’s performance, calling it dedicated, devastating, and endearing.

== Cast ==
- Vicky Krieps as Clémence
- Antoine Reinartz as Laurent
- Monia Chokri as Sarah
- Viggo Ferreira-Redier as Paul
- Féodor Atkine as Clémence's father
- Aurélia Petit
- Park Ji-min
- Manuel Vallade
- Salif Cissé
- Julien de Saint Jean
- Antoine Michel
- Malou Khebizi

== Release ==
The film premiered in the Un Certain Regard section of the 2025 Cannes Film Festival.
