= Astrid Panosyan =

Politician in France

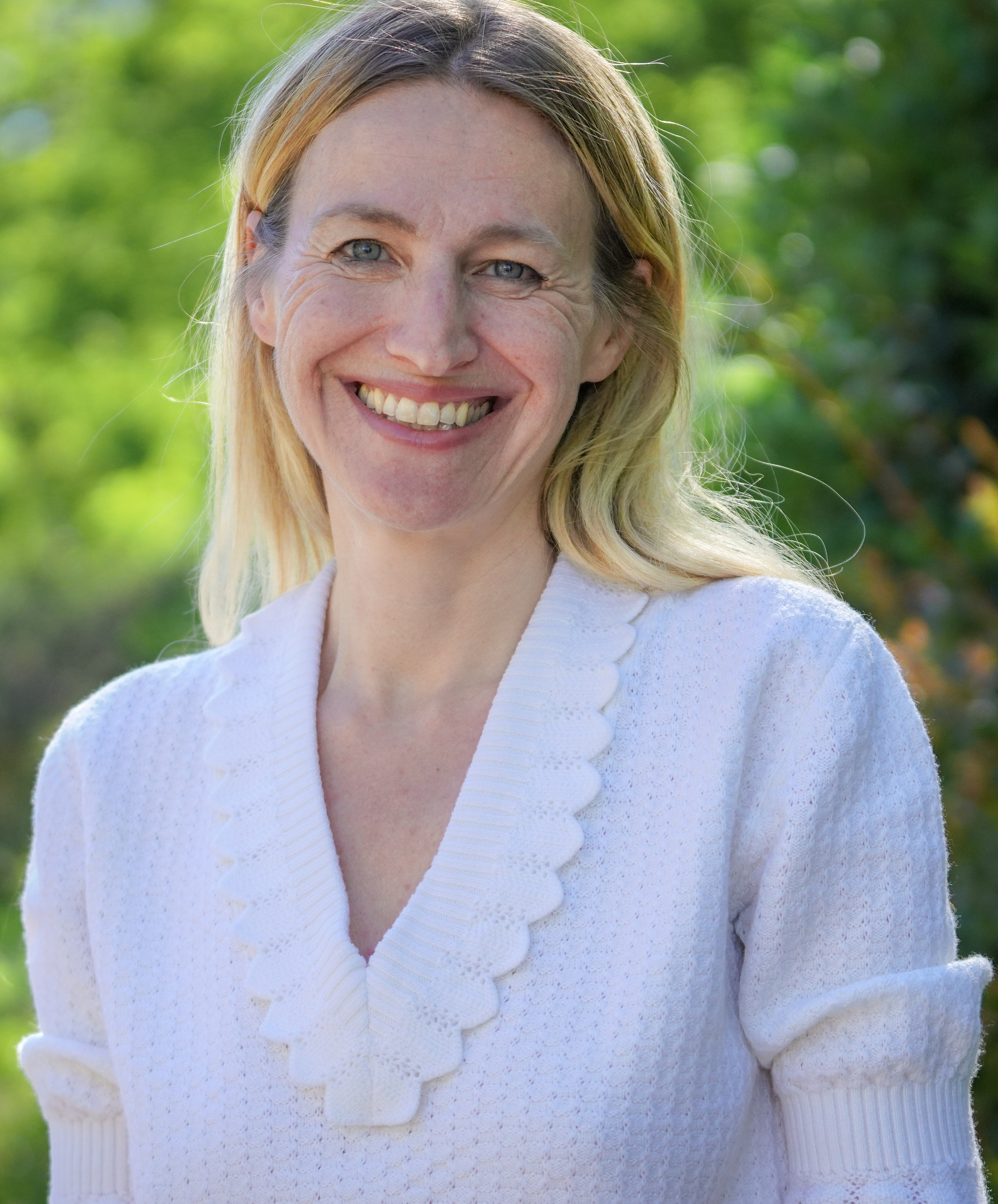
- Panosyan in 2022

Minister of Labour and Employment
- In office 21 September 2024 – 23 December 2024
- Prime Minister: Michel Barnier; François Bayrou
- Preceded by: Catherine Vautrin
- Succeeded by: Catherine Vautrin

Member of the National Assembly for Paris's 4th constituency
- Incumbent
- Assumed office 22 June 2022
- Preceded by: Brigitte Kuster

Councillor of the 9th arrondissement of Paris
- In office 18 March 2001 – 16 March 2008

Personal details
- Born: Astrid Panosyan; 13 August 1971 (age 55) Paris, France
- Party: LREM/RE (2016–present)
- Other political affiliations: PS (2001–2007)
- Spouse: Laurent Bouvet (died 2021)
- Children: 2
- Education: HEC Paris; Sciences Po; Harvard Kennedy School

Astrid Panosyan-Bouvet (born 13 August 1971) is a French politician and corporate director who served as Minister of Labour in the successive governments of Prime Ministers Michel Barnier and François Bayrou from 2024 to 2025. She served as a member of the National Assembly for Paris's 4th constituency from 2022 to 2024.

== Early life and education ==
Born to an Armenian father and a Norwegian mother, Panosyan-Bouvet is a graduate of HEC Paris, Sciences Po and the Harvard Kennedy School.

== Career in the private sector ==
Panosyan-Bouvet held senior positions at two of the main insurance groups in France, AXA and Groupama.

== Political career ==
As a member of Emmanuel Macron’s cabinet when he was France’s economy minister, Panosyan-Bouvet advised him on international investments and the attractiveness of France’s economy. In 2016, she co-founded the En Marche movement and was later part of a trio (together with Arnaud Leroy and Bariza Khiari) who led the movement for several months before Christophe Castaner took over the position as party leader. As the movement’s head of international relations, she negotiated its coalition with the Alliance of Liberals and Democrats for Europe (ALDE) ahead of the 2019 European Parliament election.

In parliament, Panosyan-Bouvet served on the Committee on Social Affairs from 2022 to 2024. In addition to her committee assignments, she was a member of the French-Israeli Parliamentary Friendship Group and the French-American Parliamentary Friendship Group from 2022 to 2024.

== Other activities ==
- Centre Pompidou, Member of the Supervisory Board (2022–2024)
