= Lucien Paye =

French politician (1907–1972)

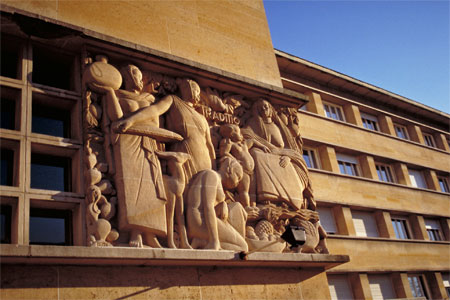
Residence Lucien Paye, Cité internationale universitaire de Paris.

Lucien Paye (born in Vernoil-le-Fourrier, Maine-et-Loire on 28 June 1907 – died on 25 April 1972) was a French politician.

He was doctor of letters. He was Minister of National Education from 20 February 1961 to 15 April 1962 in the Government Michel Debré, then senior representative of France in Senegal in 1962. He was the first ambassador of France in China from 1964 to 1969. He chaired the Committee on Reform of the ORTF from 1968 to 1970 and was the first president of the Court of Audits from 1970 to 1972. His son, Jean-Claude Paye, became Secretary-General of the Organisation for Economic Co-operation and Development (OECD).

Political offices
Preceded by Pierre Guillaumat	Minister of National Education; 1961–1962	Succeeded by Pierre Sudreau
