= Jean-Louis Debré =

French politician (1944–2025)

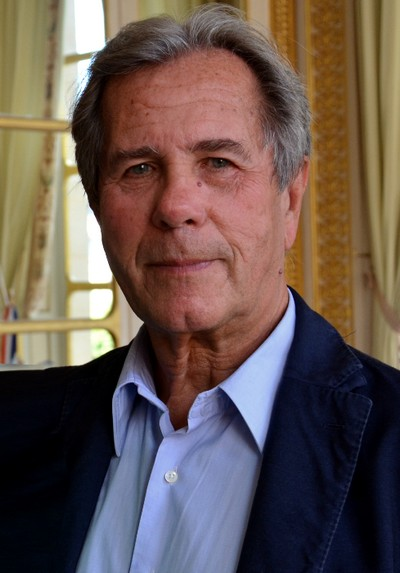
- Debré in 2012

President of the Constitutional Council
- In office 5 March 2007 – 4 March 2016
- Appointed by: Jacques Chirac
- Preceded by: Pierre Mazeaud
- Succeeded by: Laurent Fabius

President of the National Assembly
- In office 25 June 2002 – 2 March 2007
- Preceded by: Raymond Forni
- Succeeded by: Patrick Ollier

Minister of the Interior
- In office 18 May 1995 – 4 June 1997
- President: Jacques Chirac
- Prime Minister: Alain Juppé
- Preceded by: Charles Pasqua
- Succeeded by: Jean-Pierre Chevènement

Member of the National Assembly for Eure's 1st constituency
- In office 1 June 1997 – 5 March 2007
- Preceded by: Françoise Charpentier
- Succeeded by: Françoise Charpentier
- In office 2 April 1986 – 18 June 1995
- Succeeded by: Françoise Charpentier

Mayor of Évreux
- In office 18 March 2001 – 12 March 2007
- Preceded by: Roland Plaisance
- Succeeded by: Jean-Pierre Nicolas

Personal details
- Born: 30 September 1944 Toulouse, France
- Died: 4 March 2025 (aged 80) Paris, France
- Party: RPR; UMP; The Republicans
- Spouse: Anne-Marie Debré (d. 2007)
- Relations: Bernard Debré (twin brother); François Debré (brother)
- Children: Charles; Guillaume; Marie-Victoire
- Parent(s): Michel Debré; Anne-Marie Lemaresquier
- Education: École nationale de la magistrature Sciences Po
- Website: Website

Jean-Louis Debré (French pronunciation: [ʒɑ̃ lwi dəbʁe]; 30 September 1944 – 4 March 2025) was a French judge and politician who served as President of the National Assembly from 2002 to 2007 and President of the Constitutional Council from 2007 to 2016. He was Minister of the Interior from 1995 until 1997 during the presidency of Jacques Chirac. From 2016 until his death, he was President of the Superior Council of Archives.

== Early life and family ==
Debré was born on 30 September 1944 in Toulouse, the son of future Prime Minister Michel Debré and Anne-Marie Lemaresquier. He had three brothers: Vincent Debré (born 1939), a businessman, François Debré (1942–2020), a journalist, and his twin brother Bernard Debré, a doctor and politician (1944–2020).

He was a grandson of the paediatrician Robert Debré and, on his mother's side, of the architect Charles Lemaresquier, as well as a nephew of the painter Olivier Debré.

He married Anne-Marie Engel (1945–2007) and has three children: Charles-Emmanuel Debré (director of key accounts at Bouygues Télécom), Guillaume Debré (a journalist) and Marie-Victoire Debré (an actress). A pupil at the Cours Hattemer in Paris, he continued his education at the Lycée Janson-de-Sailly.

As an adolescent, he suffered from a spinal compression and was unable to sit the baccalauréat.

Later, Pierre Mazeaud, a former member of Michel Debré's cabinet and family friend, suggested that he enrol for a law degree at Panthéon-Assas University. He thus obtained a law degree that would enable him to pursue his career. Debré held a law degree, a postgraduate diploma in public law and a postgraduate diploma in political science, and a doctorate in public law (1973) with a thesis on the ‘Constitutional ideas of General de Gaulle', supervised by Roger-Gérard Schwartzenberg.

He is also an alumnus of the Institut d'études politiques de Paris, from which he graduated in 1971.

== Political career ==
=== Early days ===
In the 1973 legislative elections, Debré was the UDR candidate in the constituency of Calais, held until then by Jacques Vendroux, General de Gaulle's brother-in-law. He was defeated in the second round by the Communist candidate Jean-Jacques Barthe.

Debré joined the Rally for the Republic (RPR) when it was founded by Jacques Chirac in 1976.

In 1978, he was the RPR candidate in the first constituency of Eure, but only came fourth in the first round.

He entered the opposition in 1981, following François Mitterrand's victory in the presidential election; in 2021, he revealed that he had voted for Mitterrand in the past.

=== Minister of the Interior ===
In 1995, as part of his ministerial duties, he was confronted with a series of Islamist attacks carried out on French territory by the Armed Islamic Group of Algeria (GIA).

Debré’s priority during his term was the cessation of hostilities in war-ridden Corsica, particularly with the largest military formation at the time, the FLNC-Canal Historique. Along with prime minister Alain Juppé, Debré spearheaded the Tralonca peace campaign. This gave him a very negative reputation in parliament, where he was viewed as negotiating with “terrorists”. This caused a series of backlashes in the National Assembly, where Debré was exposed to constant criticism on his treatment of Corsica by both members of parliament and Corsican nationalists, who claimed his negotiations weren't in the proper interest of the Corsican people. The agreements failed after Debré and other people involved refused to release political prisoners arrested during the peace process.

On 23 August 1996, he ordered the expulsion of some 300 undocumented immigrants occupying the Saint-Bernard church in Paris, although he had previously declared that he would act ‘with humanity and heart’. Despite the government's declarations, most of these foreigners were ultimately not deported, as they had strong ties in France that made any ‘deportation measure’ complex. Tens of thousands of people took part in demonstrations criticising the Juppé government's policies, calling for the repeal of the Pasqua-Debré laws. In November 1996, Debré presented a bill containing ‘various provisions relating to immigration’, which included the following measures: stepping up measures to expel undocumented immigrants, extending identity checks to production sites and building sites; and allowing police officers to search vehicles under certain conditions. In reality, these new provisions resulted in very few deportations.

The 1997 legislative elections, which led to the victory of the Plural Left, would mark Debré's return to Eure. His local anchoring was furthered in 2001, when he became mayor of Évreux, beating outgoing Communist Roland Plaisance, who had been in office since 1977. On 16 September 1997, a few months after the start of the third cohabitation period, he was elected chairman of the RPR group in the National Assembly in the second round by 81 votes to Franck Borotra's 57.

=== President of the National Assembly ===
A loyal supporter of Jacques Chirac, Debré regularly showed opposition to Nicolas Sarkozy, believing himself to be too different from the then-mayor of Neuilly-sur-Seine, and saying that he ‘doesn't like the State’.

In the 2002 legislative elections, Debré was re-elected in the 1st constituency of Eure, but was not appointed to the Jean-Pierre Raffarin government. He then ran for the presidency of the National Assembly, which was also coveted by Édouard Balladur, with whom Debré had a reputedly poor relationship. Balladur withdrew after the first round of voting, and Debré was elected president in the second round on 25 June 2002 after receiving 342 votes in the second round, against 142 for Socialist candidate Paulette Guinchard-Kunstler and 21 for Communist candidate Muguette Jacquaint.

Debré's victory even came as a surprise to his friend Jacques Chirac, who had advised him not to run, convinced that he would be defeated.

During his presidency, Debré gained a reputation as a ‘rigorous supporter of the rights of the opposition’, esteemed far beyond his own political camp.

=== President of the Constitutional Council ===
On 23 February 2007, Jacques Chirac appointed Debré as President of the Constitutional Council to replace Pierre Mazeaud, shortly before Nicolas Sarkozy became president. In 2008, he broke with the duty of reserve attached to his office by expressing ‘reservations’ about Sarkozy's presidential style and, in 2010, by deeming the forthcoming trial of Jacques Chirac ‘pointless for him and for France’.

During his presidency, he regularly lunched with the President of the MEDEF and business leaders to discuss the case law of the Constitutional Council, in particular in preparation for the Constitutional Council's decision on the 2012 Appropriation bill. According to Debré, at one of these lunches, held in the presence of Secretary General of the Constitutional Council Marc Guillaume, Pierre Gattaz, President of the MEDEF, gave his analysis of the economic situation, citing a restrictive and paralysing legislative environment. On the bills and proposals for legislation on the social economy, internships, labour inspection, arduous work and biodiversity, Gattaz said at the lunch that he expected a lot from the Constitutional Council and that the MEDEF had not been disappointed by its previous decisions.

He was the patron of the 2011–2012 class of the Paris Court of Appeal Bar School, which trains future Parisian lawyers. He was also the patron of the 2014–2015 class of the South-East France Bar School. He was also an honorary member of the Observatoire du Patrimoine Religieux (OPR), a multi-faith association that works to preserve and promote France's religious heritage. He was also the patron of the 2017–2018 graduating class of the Ecole du Centre Ouest des Avocats.

His term as President of the Constitutional Council expired on 4 March 2016. He was replaced by Laurent Fabius. The following day, on 5 March, the Ministry of Culture announced his appointment as Chairman of the Conseil Supérieur des Archives, succeeding historian Georgette Elgey.

=== Retirement ===
In April 2016, Debré published the memoir Ce que je ne pouvais pas dire, which looks back on his nine years as President of the Constitutional Council. His book highlights his difficult relationship with Nicolas Sarkozy, his courteous relationship with François Hollande, and the work and development of an institution that saw its remit increase with the 2008 constitutional reform. The book was met with some commercial success. Another memoir, Tu le raconteras plus tard, was published in 2017; Debré devoted it to his years as Minister of the Interior and President of the National Assembly.

In September 2016, he became a radio and television commentator. That same year, he was the patron of the 2016–2017 class of the master's degree in corporate taxation at Paris Dauphine University.

During the COVID-19 pandemic, the French government commissioned him to draw up a report on the potential postponement of the 2021 regional and departmental elections. He submitted his report on 13 November 2020, recommending that they be postponed until June, as the elections were normally scheduled for March.

In 2022, Debré produced a play with his partner, Ces femmes qui ont réveillé la France, about women who have left their mark on French history. The play was adapted from the essay of the same name published in 2012. He performed in the play with Valérie Bochenek (co-author) and pianist Christophe Dies.

== Death ==
Debré died in Paris on 4 March 2025, at the age of 80.

== Political positions ==
In 2005, The Guardian described Debré as "perhaps the most dedicated of all defenders of the Chirac faith." He later voted for François Hollande in the 2012 French presidential election. In the Republicans' 2016 presidential primaries, he publicly endorsed Alain Juppé as the party's candidate for the 2017 elections., though he later voted for Emmanuel Macron rather than the Republican candidate François Fillon.

== Bibliography ==
- Le Pouvoir Politique (co-author, 1976)
- Le Gaullisme (co-author, 1977)
- La Justice au XIXe Siècle, les Magistrats (1980)
- Les Républiques des Avocats (1984)
- Le Curieux (1986)
- En mon for intérieur (1997)
- Pièges (1998)
- Le Gaullisme n'est pas une Nostalgie (1999)
- Quand les Brochets font Courir les Carpes (2008)
- Les oubliés de la République (2008)
- Ce que je ne pouvais pas dire (2016)
- Tu le raconteras plus tard (2017)

== See also ==
- Debré family

Political offices
Preceded by Charles Pasqua	Minister of the Interior; 1995–1997	Succeeded by Jean-Pierre Chevènement
Preceded by Raymond Forni	President of the National Assembly; 2002–2007	Succeeded by Patrick Ollier
Legal offices
Preceded by Pierre Mazeaud	President of the Constitutional Council; 2007–2016	Succeeded by Laurent Fabius
