= Chatenet Commission =

The Chatenet Commission was the third and last Commission of the European Atomic Energy Community (Euratom), serving from 10 January 1962 to 5 July 1967. Its president was Pierre Chatenet of France. There were only three Euratom Commissions, and this was the last, before the executive institutions of Euratom, the European Coal and Steel Community and the European Economic Community were merged in 1967 under the Merger Treaty. The European Communities already existed before the merger.
