= Paris's 4th constituency =

Constituency of the National Assembly of France

4th constituency of Paris
- inline Constituency of the National Assembly of France

- Paris, showing its legislative constituency boundaries from 2012
- Deputy: Astrid Panosyan-Bouvet; RE
- Department: Paris
- Registered voters: 69,753

4th constituency of Paris
- inline Constituency of the National Assembly of France

- Paris, showing its legislative constituencies between 1988 and 2012
- Member: constituency abolished, 2012
- Department: Paris

Map of Paris constituencies in 1981.

The 4th constituency of Paris (French: Quatrième circonscription de Paris) is a French legislative constituency in the Paris département (75). Like the other 576 French constituencies, it elects one MP using the two-round system.

The present constituency has existed since the 2012 election, having been created by the 2010 redistricting of French legislative constituencies.

From 1958–1986, the 4th constituency referred to a constituency with different boundaries, and again from 1988–2012, having been created by the 1986 redistricting of French legislative constituencies. For the 1986 election, proportional representation was used.

== Historic representation ==
Election	Member	Party	Source
1958	Jean Albert-Sorel	CNIP	
1962	Pierre Bas	UNR	
1967	Pierre Bas	UDR	
1968	Pierre Bas	UDR	
1973	Pierre Bas	UDR	
1978	Pierre Bas	RPR	
1981	Pierre Bas	RPR	
1986	Proportional representation - no election by constituency		
1988	Gabriel Kaspereit	RPR	
1993	Gabriel Kaspereit	RPR	
1997	Pierre Lellouche	RPR	
2002	Pierre Lellouche	UMP	
2007	Pierre Lellouche	UMP	
2009	Edwige Antier	UMP	
2012	Bernard Debré	UMP	
2017	Brigitte Kuster	LR	
2022	Astrid Panosyan-Bouvet	RE	

== Election results ==
=== 2024 ===
Candidate	Party	Alliance	First round			Second round		
Candidate	Party	Alliance	Votes	%	+/–	Votes	%	+/–
Astrid Panosyan-Bouvet	RE	ENS	19,677	37.19	-3.84	24,026	51.93	-3.53
Geoffroy Boulard	LR		14,048	26.55	-2.36	22,236	48.07	+3.53
Théa Foudrinier	DVG	NFP	9,474	17.91	+4.64	WITHDREW		
Arnaud Dassier	LR-RN	UXD	8,227	15.55	+11.87			
Olivier Courtois	REC		1,135	2.15	-6.33			
Pierre Levenard	LO		105	0.20	±0.00			
Karim Britel	DIV		99	0.19	-0.04			
Laetitia Lauron	DIV		84	0.16	N/A			
Guillaume Cardon	DIV		56	0.11	N/A			
Emile Mahieu	DIV		0	0.00	N/A			
Valid votes			52,905	99.13	-0.01	46,262	96.27	+0.89
Blank votes			313	0.59	-0.04	1,423	2.96	-0.84
Null votes			153	0.29	+0.05	369	0.77	-0.05
Turnout			53,371	72.91	+19.91	48,054	65.64	+16.01
Abstentions			19,833	27.09	-19.91	25,150	34.36	-16.01
Registered voters			73,204			73,204		
Source: Ministry of the Interior, Le Monde
Result						RE HOLD		

=== 2022 ===
Legislative Election 2022: Paris's 4th constituency
Party	Candidate	Votes	%	±%
LREM (Ensemble)	Astrid Panosyan-Bouvet	15,728	41.03	-4.97
LR (UDC)	Brigitte Kuster	11,085	28.92	-7.50
LFI (NUPÉS)	Natalie Depraz	5,087	13.27	+4.79
REC	Garen Shnorhokian	3,252	8.48	N/A
RN	Annie Marcelle Mauricette Lavenier	1,412	3.68	+0.80
DVE	Chantal Eclou	857	2.24	N/A
Others	N/A	915		
Turnout		38,674	53.00	−2.63
2nd round result
LREM (Ensemble)	Astrid Panosyan-Bouvet	19,158	55.45	+6.96
LR (UDC)	Brigitte Kuster	15,389	44.55	−6.96
Turnout		34,547	49.63	+0.68
LREM gain from LR				

=== 2017 ===
Legislative Election 2017: Paris's 4th constituency
Party	Candidate	Votes	%	±%
LREM	Ilana Cicurel	17,726	46.00	N/A
LR	Brigitte Kuster	14,032	36.42	−8.65
LFI	Mélanie Monier	1,402	3.64	N/A
FN	Ève Froger	1,108	2.88	−2.26
PS	Fabrice Dassie	950	2.47	−15.24
EELV	Hanna Clairiere	912	2.37	+0.36
Others	N/A	2,402		
Turnout		38,806	55.63	−2.29
2nd round result
LR	Brigitte Kuster	17,024	51.51	−48.49
LREM	Ilana Cicurel	16,024	48.49	N/A
Turnout		34,147	48.95	+18.49
LR hold		Swing		

=== 2012 ===
Legislative Election 2012: Paris's 4th constituency
Party	Candidate	Votes	%
UMP	Bernard Debre	17,595	45.07
DVD	Brigitte Kuster*	8,981	23.01
PS	Agnès Pannier	6,913	17.71
FN	Jean Mairey	2,005	5.14
MoDem	Martine Le Gall	860	2.20
EELV	Isabelle Faugeras	783	2.01
Others	N/A	1,902	
Turnout		39,039	57.92
2nd round result
UMP	Bernard Debre	20,526	100.00
Turnout		20,526	30.46
UMP win (new boundaries)			

* Withdrew before the 2nd round

=== 2007 ===
Elections between 1988 and 2007 were based on the 1988 boundaries.

Map of Paris Constituencies, 1988-2007 elections

Legislative Election 2007: Paris's 4th constituency
Party	Candidate	Votes	%	±%
UMP	Pierre Lellouche	19,456	51.96	
PS	Corinne Barlis	7,704	20.57	
MoDem	Claire Gibault	5,272	14.08	
LV	Nicole Azzaro	1,399	3.74	
FN	Annie Thierry	896	2.39	
Others	N/A	2,720		
Turnout		37,714	63.28	
UMP hold				

=== 2002 ===
Legislative Election 2002: Paris's 4th constituency
Party	Candidate	Votes	%	±%
UMP	Pierre Lellouche	18,771	53.20	
PS	Emmanuelle Prouet	9,249	26.21	
FN	Annie Thierry	2,218	6.29	
LV	Jean-Bernard Peyronel	1,440	4.08	
Others	N/A	3,604		
Turnout		35,632	69.76	
UMP hold				

=== 1997 ===
Legislative Election 1997: Paris's 4th constituency
Party	Candidate	Votes	%	±%
RPR	Pierre Lellouche	9,816	31.51	
PS	Jacques Bravo	6,856	22.01	
RPR	Gabriel Kaspereit*	5,317	17.07	
FN	Eliane Dumont	3,065	9.84	
PCF	Jacques Daguenet	1,332	4.28	
LV	Joseph Finkelstajn	804	2.58	
DVD	Bruno North	755	2.42	
Others	N/A	3,207		
Turnout		31,940	60.73	
2nd round result
RPR	Pierre Lellouche	20,239	64.34	
PS	Jacques Bravo	11,217	35.66	
Turnout		32,872	62.51	
RPR hold				

* RPR dissident
