= Brigitte Kuster =

French politician (born 1959)

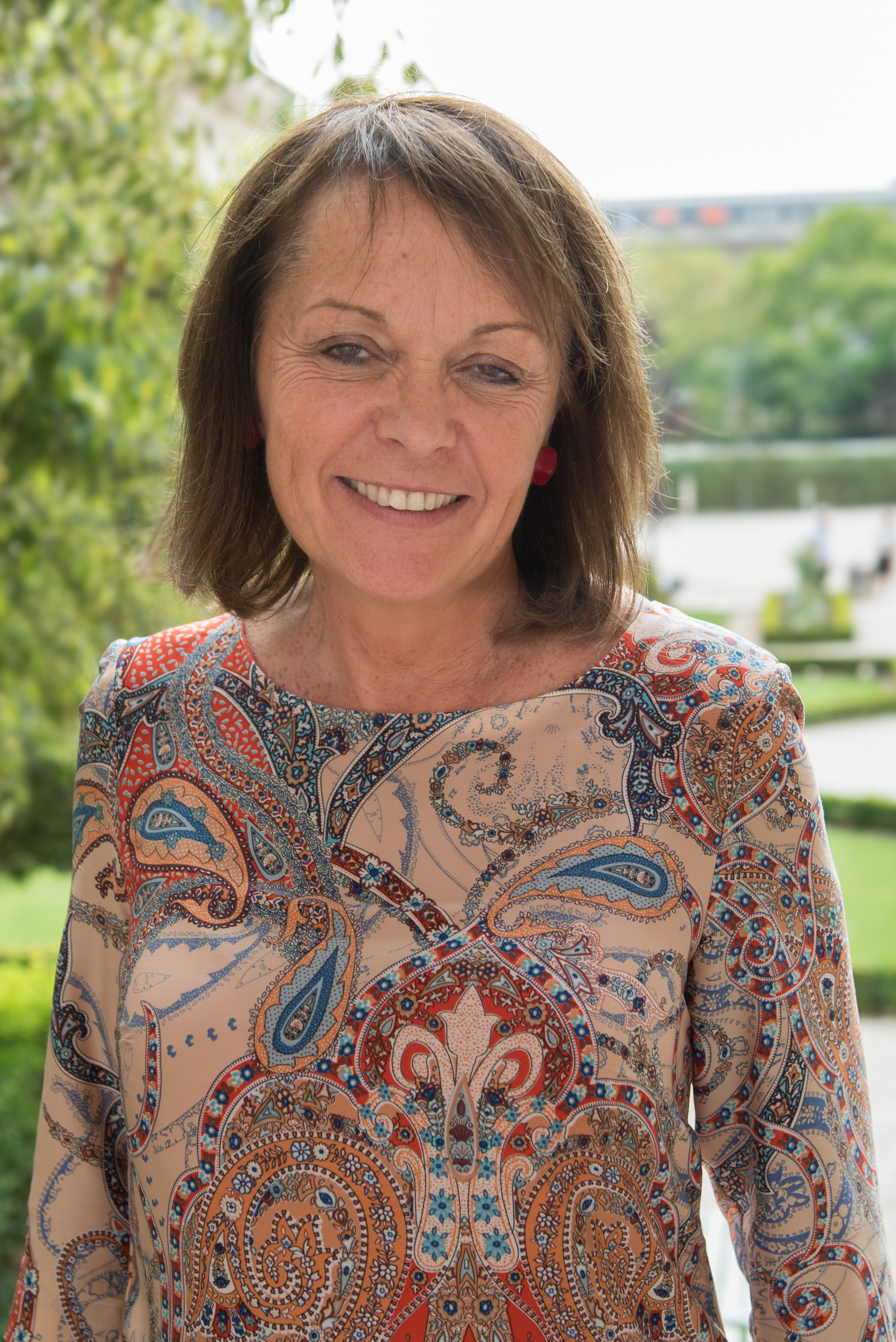

Member of the National Assembly for Paris's 4th constituency
- In office 21 June 2017 – 21 June 2022
- Preceded by: Bernard Debré
- Succeeded by: Astrid Panosyan

Mayor of the 17th arrondissement of Paris
- In office 29 March 2008 – 11 July 2017
- Preceded by: Françoise de Panafieu
- Succeeded by: Geoffroy Boulard

Personal details
- Born: Brigitte Thomas; 12 April 1959 (age 66); Saint-Cloud, France
- Political party: RPR (until 2002); UMP (2002–2015); The Republicans (since 2015)
- Spouse: Gérard Kuster

Brigitte Kuster (née Thomas, born April 12, 1959) is a French politician who served as Member of the National Assembly for the 4th constituency of Paris from 2017 to 2022. A member of The Republicans (LR), her constituency covers parts of the 16th and 17th arrondissements. Kuster previously served as Mayor of the 17th arrondissement from 2008 to 2017.

== Political career ==
A journalist by occupation, she started her career at Europe 1 before becoming a public servant at the Ministry of the Environment. She was elected to the Council of Paris in the 2001 municipal election and became Mayor of the 17th arrondissement seven years later. In January 2016, Kuster was appointed party spokesperson under the leadership of Nicolas Sarkozy, alongside Guillaume Peltier, Valérie Debord and Guillaume Larrivé. She retained the position until December 2017.

In Parliament, where she succeeded Bernard Debré after the 2017 legislative election, Kuster served on the Committee on Cultural Affairs and Education. In addition to her committee assignments, she is part of the French-Cambodian Parliamentary Friendship Group, the French-Haitian Parliamentary Friendship Group and the French-Tunisian Parliamentary Friendship Group.

In a ranking published by Le Parisien in early 2021, Kuster was ranked as most active lawmaker, having attended more parliamentary sessions than any other member of the National Assembly between 2017 and 2020.

She lost her seat in the second round in the 2022 French legislative election.

== Political positions ==
In the 2016 The Republicans presidential primary, Kuster endorsed Nicolas Sarkozy as the party's candidate for the office of President of France. In the Republicans' 2017 leadership election, she endorsed Laurent Wauquiez. Ahead of the 2022 presidential elections, she publicly declared her support for Michel Barnier as the Republicans’ candidate.
