= Orvilliers =

- Commune
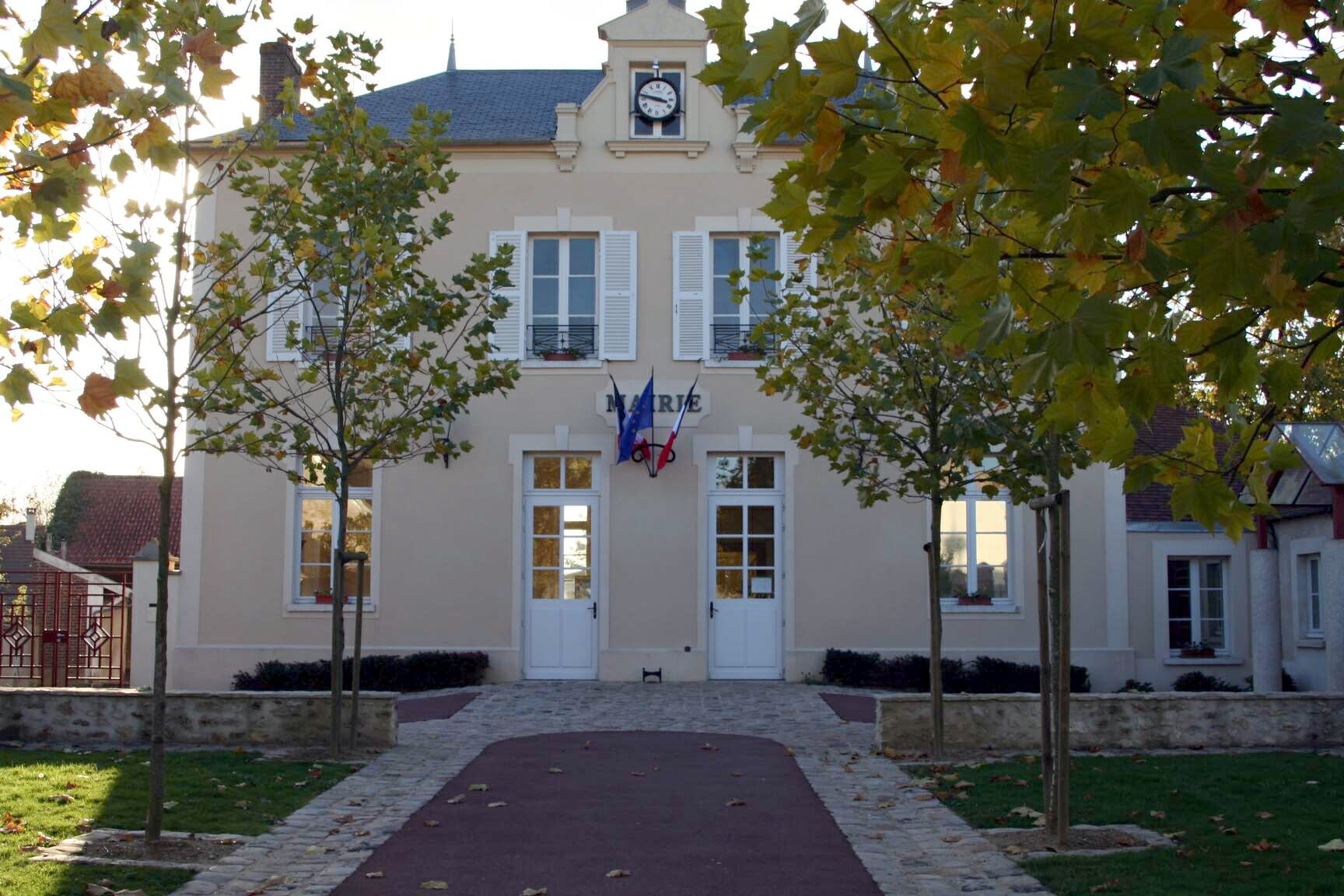
- Town hall
- Location of Orvilliers
- Location within France Location within Île-de-France (region)
- Coordinates: 48°51′35″N 1°38′37″E
- Country: France
- Region: Île-de-France
- Department: Yvelines
- Arrondissement: Mantes-la-Jolie
- Canton: Bonnières-sur-Seine
- Intercommunality: Pays houdanais

Government
  - Mayor (2020–2026): Marie Flis
- Area^{1}: 5.94 km^{2} (2.29 sq mi)
- Elevation: 131 m (430 ft)
- Highest elevation: 138 m (453 ft)
- Lowest elevation: 99 m (325 ft)
- Population (2023): 925
  - Density: 156/km^{2} (403/sq mi)
- Time zone: UTC+01:00 (CET)
  - Summer (DST): UTC+02:00 (CEST)
- INSEE/Postal code: 78474 /78910
- ^{1} French Land Register data, which excludes lakes, ponds, glaciers > 1 km^{2} (0.386 sq mi or 247 acres) and river estuaries.

Orvilliers (French pronunciation: [ɔʁvilje]) is a commune in the Yvelines department in the Île-de-France region in north-central France.

Georges Pompidou, President of France from 1969 to his death in 1974, is buried in the local cemetery.

== See also ==
- Communes of the Yvelines department
