= Pierre Chatenet =

French politician (1917–1997)

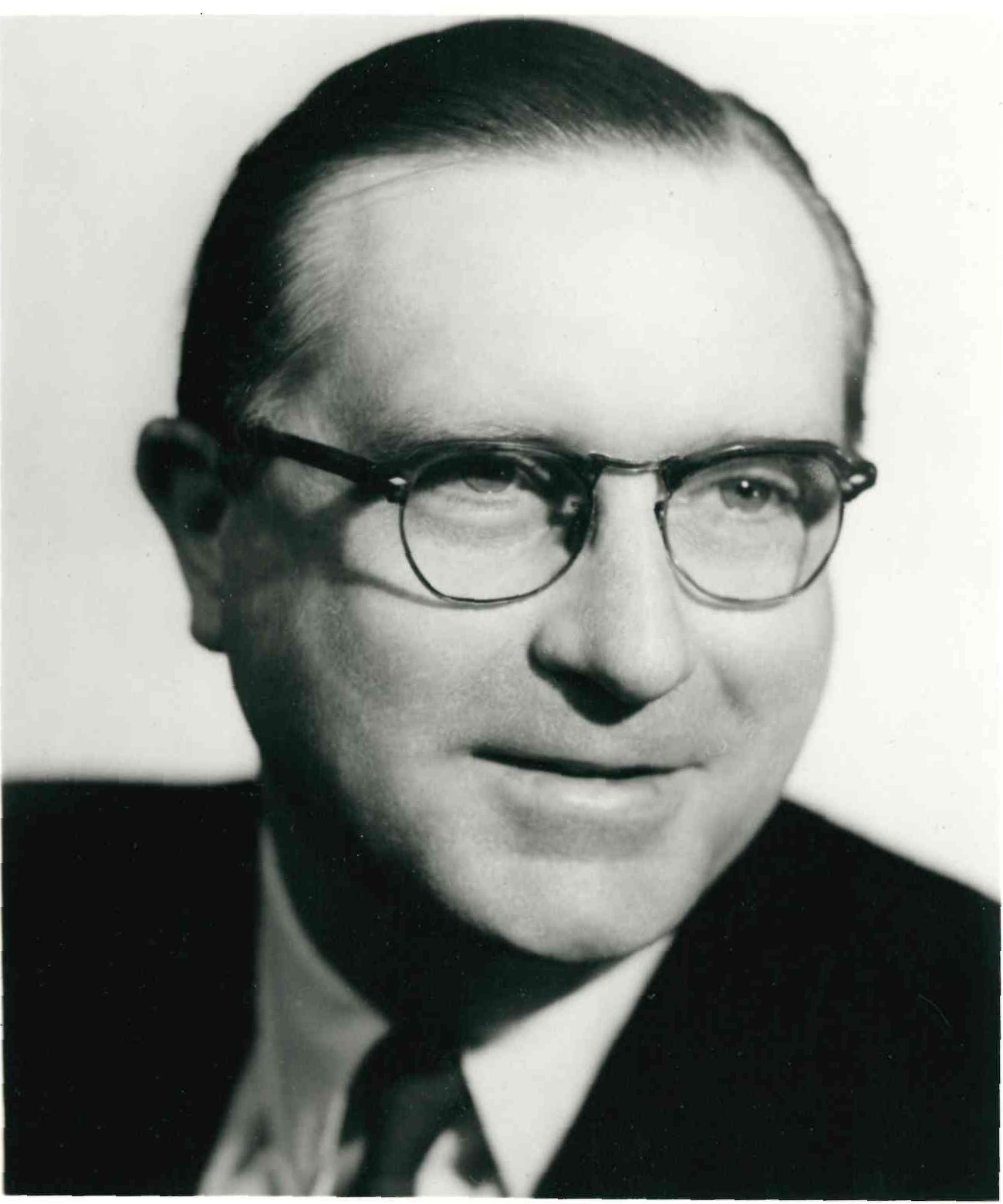

Minister of the Interior
- In office 28 May 1959 – 6 May 1961
- President: Charles de Gaulle
- Prime Minister: Michel Debré
- Preceded by: Jean Berthoin
- Succeeded by: Roger Frey

Personal details
- Born: 6 March 1917 Paris, France
- Died: 4 September 1997 (aged 80) Tavers, France
- Education: Lycée Buffon
- Alma mater: Sciences Po

Pierre Chatenet (French: [pjɛʁ ʃatnɛ]; 6 March 1917 – 4 September 1997) was a French politician. He served as French Interior Minister from 1959 to 1961. From 1962 he became the last president of the Commission of the European Atomic Energy Community, until the body was merged with the European Economic Community in 1967. (See Chatenet Commission)

== Honors and awards ==
- Commander of the Order of Legion of Honour
- Commander of the Ordre National du Mérite
- Grand Cross of the Order of the Crown (Belgium)
