= Bernard Debré =

French urologist and politician (1944–2020)

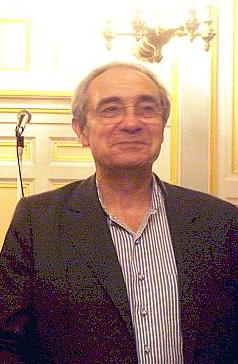
- Bernard Debré in 2013

Councillor of Paris
- In office 16 March 2008 – 13 September 2020
- Mayor: Bertrand Delanoë; Anne Hidalgo

Member of the National Assembly for Paris's 4th constituency
- In office 20 June 2012 – 20 June 2017
- Preceded by: Gilbert Gantier
- Succeeded by: Brigitte Kuster

Minister for the Cooperation
- In office 12 November 1994 – 11 May 1995
- President: François Mitterrand
- Prime Minister: Édouard Balladur
- Preceded by: Michel Roussin
- Succeeded by: Jacques Godfrain

Mayor of Amboise
- In office 1992–2001
- Preceded by: André Chollet
- Succeeded by: Christian Guyon

Personal details
- Born: 30 September 1944 Toulouse, France
- Died: 13 September 2020 (aged 75) 14th arrondissement of Paris, France
- Party: The Republicans
- Relations: Jean-Louis Debré (twin brother); François Debré
- Parent(s): Michel Debré; Anne-Marie Lemaresquier
- Education: Pierre and Marie Curie University
- Occupation: Politicial; urologist

Bernard Debré (French: [bɛʁnaʁ dəbʁe]; 30 September 1944 – 13 September 2020) was a French urologist at Hôpital Cochin and a member (deputy) of the National Assembly of France. He was one of the representatives of the city of Paris, and was a member of the Union for a Popular Movement. He is a son of Anne-Marie Lemaresquier and politician Michel Debré, who was Prime Minister of France, and twin-brother of Jean-Louis Debré.

== Biography ==
Bernard Debré attended the Cours Hattemer, a private school. He died from cancer on 13 September 2020 in Paris at the age of 75. His brother François died on the next day.

== Honors and awards ==
- Chevalier of the Order of Legion of Honour
- Grand Officer of the Order of Mono
