= Roger Frey =

French politician

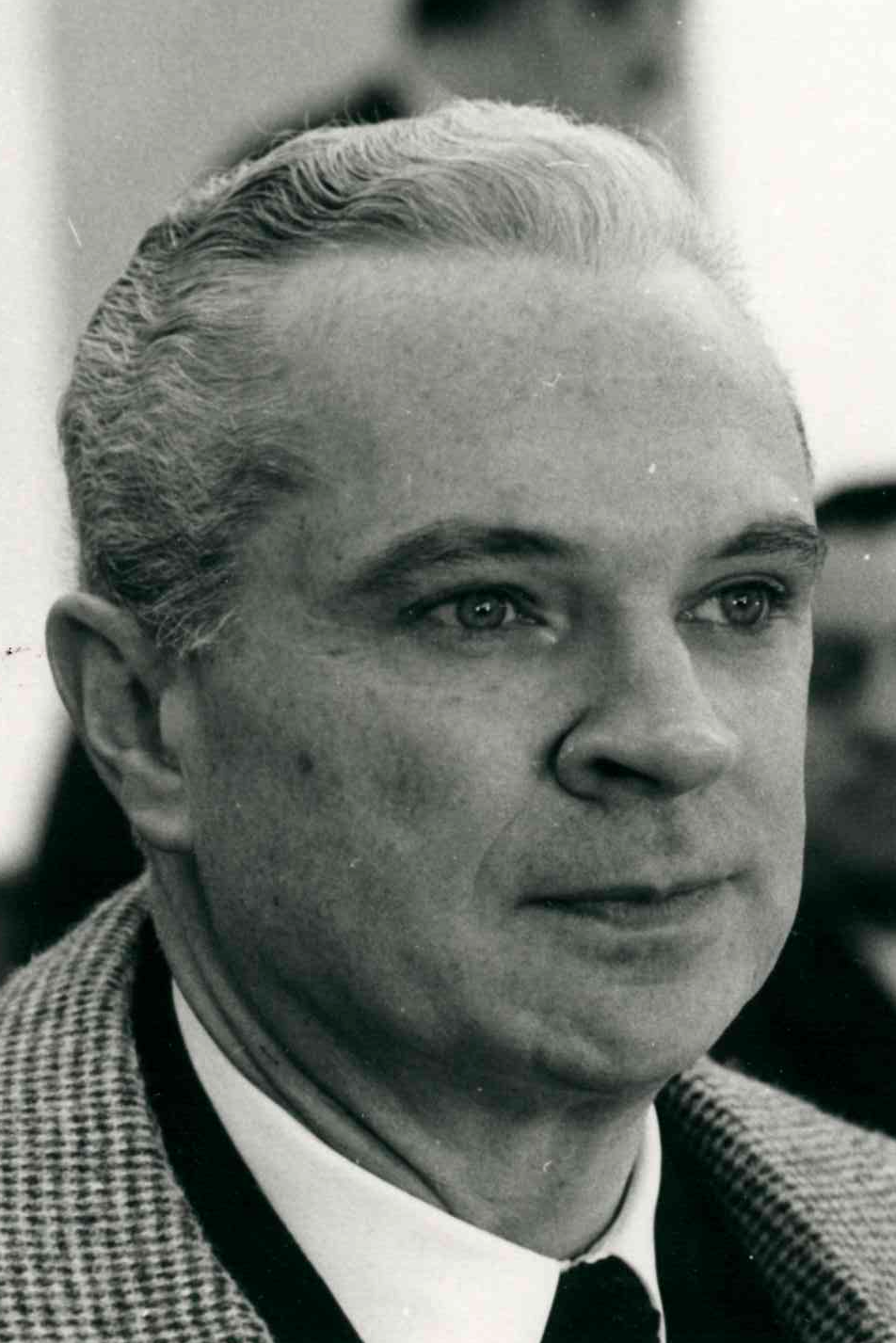
- Portrait of Roger Frey

President of the Constitutional Council
- In office 5 March 1974 – 4 March 1983
- Appointed by: Georges Pompidou
- Preceded by: Gaston Palewski
- Succeeded by: Daniel Mayer

Minister of the Interior
- In office 6 May 1961 – 1 April 1967
- Prime Minister: Michel Debré; Georges Pompidou
- Preceded by: Pierre Chatenet
- Succeeded by: Christian Fouchet

Minister of Information
- In office 8 January 1959 – 5 February 1960
- Prime Minister: Michel Debré
- Preceded by: Jacques Soustelle
- Succeeded by: Louis Terrenoire

Personal details
- Born: 11 June 1913 Noumea, New Caledonia
- Died: 13 September 1997 (aged 84) Neuilly-sur-Seine, France

Roger Frey (11 June 1913 – 13 September 1997) was a French politician. His parents were of Alsatian origin. He was Minister of the Interior and president of the Constitutional Council of France.

== Political career ==
In 1947, Frey joined the anti-communist Rassemblement du Peuple Français (RPF) (Rally of the French People) and was a member of the steering committee of the Gaullist movement, in 1951 he became the Treasurer. He sat on the Assembly of the French Union from 1952. He was Secretary General of the National Centre of Social Republicans in 1955. A close colleague of Jacques Soustelle he was active during the crisis of May 1958, preparing for the return of Charles de Gaulle to power. He was appointed to the Constitutional Advisory Committee.

Frey was Secretary General of the Union for the New Republic (Union pour la nouvelle République, UNR) from 1958 to 1959 and was attached to the cabinet of Jacques Soustelle, then Minister of Information. He himself was the Minister of Information from 8 January 1959 to 5 February 1960 and Minister Delegate to the Prime Minister Michel Debré until 6 May 1961, before being appointed interior minister from May 1961 until April 1967 (law Debre and Georges Pompidou). He fought against the Organisation armée secrète (OAS) at the end of the war in Algeria.

His office was marked by the violent repression of a demonstration of Algerians in Paris on 17 October 1961, during which dozens of Algerians were massacred and thrown into the Seine - sources vary between 40–200 deaths. He decided the repression. This was followed by the Charonne subway massacre on 8 February 1962 with another 9 deaths. The kidnapping of Mehdi Ben Barka by Moroccan police took place in 1965.

Under President Georges Pompidou he served as the Minister of State for Relations with the Parliament of 6 April 1967 to 31 May 1968. He held the same position in the government Maurice Couve de Murville from 10 July 1968 to 20 June 1969 and the Government Jacques Chaban-Delmas at 20 June 1969. He then served as Minister of State for Administrative Reform from 7 January 1971 to 5 July 1972.

=== Monokini prosecution ===
In 1964, he enforced the prosecution of the use of monokini, a women's one-piece bathing suit that leaves the breasts uncovered. Such bathing suit, Mr. Frey went on to say, "constituted a public offense against the sense of decency, punishable according to article 330 of the penal code. Consequently, the police chiefs must employ the services of the police so that the women who wear this bathing suit in public places are prosecuted."

Political offices
Preceded by Pierre Chatenet	Minister of the Interior; 1961–1967	Succeeded by Christian Fouchet
Legal offices
Preceded by Gaston Palewski	President of the Constitutional Council; 1974–1983	Succeeded by Daniel Mayer
