= Henriette Gascuel =

- Born: 19 May 1919; Saint-Jean-du-Gard
- Died: 10 January 1976; Reunion island
- Other names: Sœur Colette, Sister Colette
- Education: Lycée Fénelon, Paris, Lycée Molière
- Occupations: doctor in pediatrics, franciscan missionnary
- Awards: Knight of the ordre de la Santé publique (1959); Knight of the National Order of Merit (1970)

Henriette Gascuel (19 May 1919 — 10 January 1976), also known as Sœur Colette or Sister Colette, is a Franciscan missionary and pioneer French pediatrician on the island of Réunion.

== Life ==
Henriette Gascuel was born in Saint-Jean-du-Gard on May 19, 1919 to Jeanne Luret and Charles Gascuel. Her father was a french colonial public servant. She grew up in Morocco and moved to Paris with her family in 1933.

She attended Lycée Molière and Lycée Fénelon before studying medecine under Robert Debré who greatly contributed to the field of pediatrics in France. He made her part of the very first medical team to work on the resuscitation of preterm babies. She wrote her thesis on different ways to feed newborns.

Between 1944 and 1953, she worked as a doctor at the Greater Paris University Hospitals. In 1950, Henriette Gascuel became a franciscan missionnary of Mary and journeyed to Réunion three years later with other members of the order. In 1955, she officially entered the order under the name Sister Colette, and started working in the pediatrics ward of a hospital.

Sister Colette landed on the island at a time where child malnutrition was raging. She was the very first woman doctor to work in the field of pediatrics in Réunion. She educated many generations of nurses and faced lack of hygiene and dire medical cases in the 1950s. At the same time, she worked on the project of a children's hospital which opened in Saint-Denis in 1960. In spite of lack of money, the hospital was very successful.

While working at the new hospital, she realized that the families of sick children needed to be taught to care for them once they were discharged. In 1960, a hospital unit was created to help families of sick children. Father Favron, who was in charge of hospitals in the south of the island, used Sister Colette's suggestions to make his own pediatrics wards better.

== Death ==
She died on 10 January 1976, aged 56, during a retreat. Her funeral took place on the 12th in front of the Saint-François Hospice, in Saint-Denis, in order to accommodate the masses who came to pay their respects.

== Heritage ==
In 1959, Sister Colette became knight of the Order of Public Health. In 1970, she was made a Knight of the National Order of Merit.

In 2017, a commemorative plaque in her honour was put up in the Saint-Denis children's hospital, during its 70 year anniversary celebration.
