= Montboudif =

Commune in Auvergne-Rhône-Alpes, France

- Commune
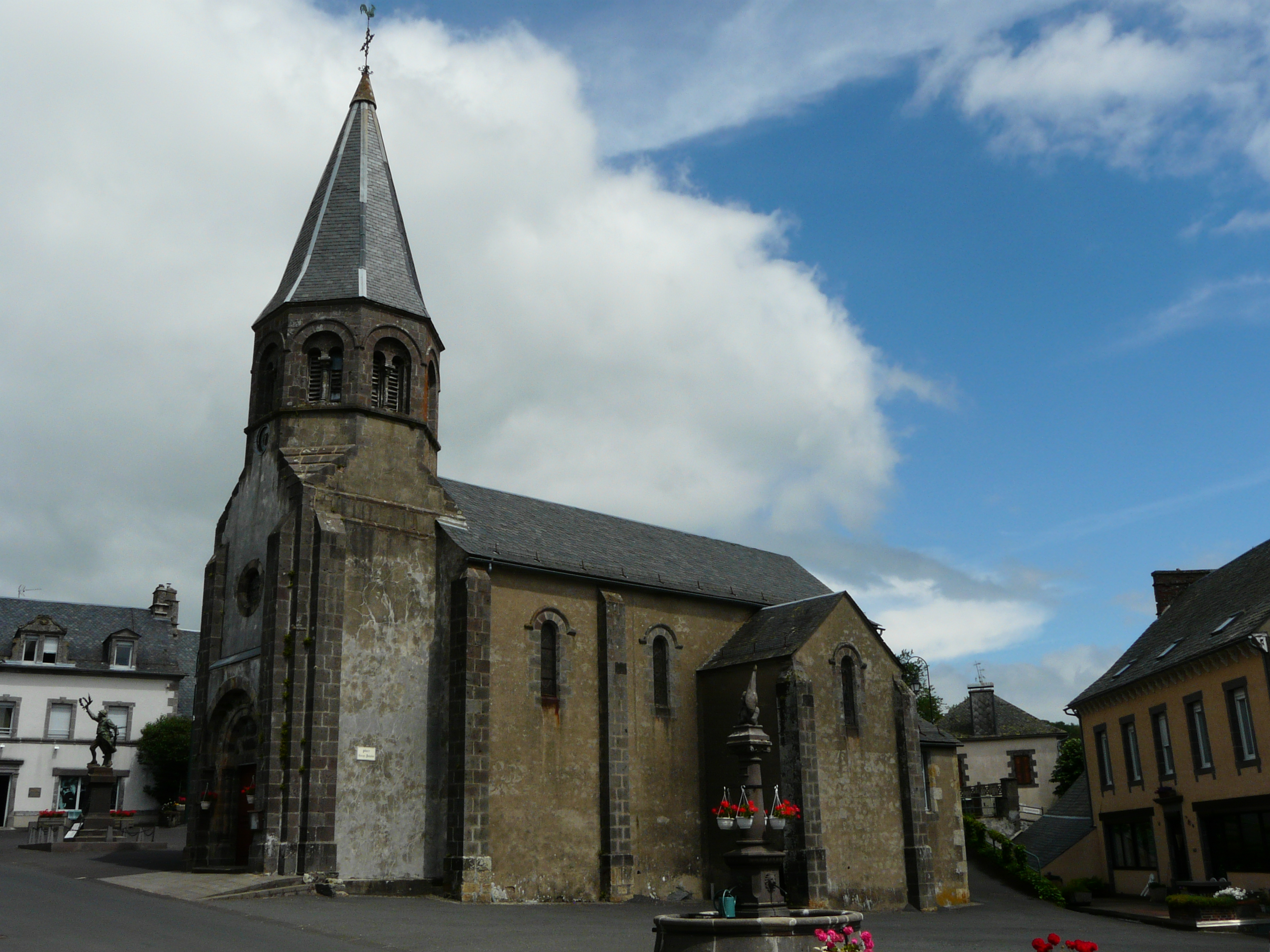
- Sainte-Anne Church
- Location of Montboudif
- Location within France Location within Auvergne-Rhône-Alpes
- Coordinates: 45°22′20″N 2°43′56″E
- Country: France
- Region: Auvergne-Rhône-Alpes
- Department: Cantal
- Arrondissement: Saint-Flour
- Canton: Riom-ès-Montagnes
- Intercommunality: Pays Gentiane

Government
  - Mayor (2020–2026): Chrystèle Serre
- Area^{1}: 20.42 km^{2} (7.88 sq mi)
- Elevation: 900 m (3,000 ft)
- Highest elevation: 1,111 m (3,645 ft)
- Lowest elevation: 580 m (1,900 ft)
- Population (2023): 161
  - Density: 7.88/km^{2} (20.4/sq mi)
- Time zone: UTC+01:00 (CET)
  - Summer (DST): UTC+02:00 (CEST)
- INSEE/Postal code: 15129 /15190
- ^{1} French Land Register data, which excludes lakes, ponds, glaciers > 1 km^{2} (0.386 sq mi or 247 acres) and river estuaries.

Montboudif (French pronunciation: [mɔ̃budif]; Occitan: Montbodiu) is a commune in the Cantal department, in south-central France.

== Geography ==
The river Rhue forms most of the commune's southern border.

There is a museum dedicated to French president Georges Pompidou who was born here.

== Population ==
Historical population
Year	Pop.	±% p.a.
1968	512	—
1975	339	−5.72%
1982	311	−1.22%
1990	251	−2.64%
1999	231	−0.92%
2007	219	−0.66%
2012	185	−3.32%
2017	190	+0.53%
2023	161	−2.72%
Source: INSEE

== Personalities ==
It is the birthplace of Georges Pompidou (1911-1974), President of France from 1969 to his death.

== See also ==
- Communes of the Cantal department
