= Michel Debré =

Prime Minister of France from 1959 to 1962

His Excellency Michel Debré
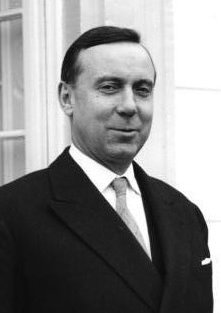
- Debré in 1960

Prime Minister of France
- In office 8 January 1959 – 14 April 1962
- President: Charles de Gaulle
- Preceded by: Charles de Gaulle
- Succeeded by: Georges Pompidou

Minister of Defence
- In office 22 June 1969 – 5 April 1973
- Prime Minister: Jacques Chaban-Delmas; Pierre Messmer
- Preceded by: Pierre Messmer
- Succeeded by: Robert Galley

Minister of Foreign Affairs
- In office 31 May 1968 – 16 June 1969
- Prime Minister: Georges Pompidou; Maurice Couve de Murville
- Preceded by: Maurice Couve de Murville
- Succeeded by: Maurice Schumann

Minister of the Economy and Finance
- In office 8 January 1966 – 31 May 1968
- Prime Minister: Georges Pompidou
- Preceded by: Valéry Giscard d'Estaing
- Succeeded by: Maurice Couve de Murville

Member of the National Assembly
- In office 26 November 1962 – 14 May 1988
- Constituency: Réunion

Personal details
- Born: Michel Jean-Pierre Debré; 15 January 1912 Paris, France
- Died: 2 August 1996 (aged 84) Montlouis-sur-Loire, Indre-et-Loire, France
- Party: Radical-Socialist Party (1934–1947); Rally of the French People (1947–1955); Union for the New Republic (1958–1968); Union of Democrats for the Republic (1968–1976); Rally for the Republic (1976–1988)
- Spouse: Anne-Marie Lemaresquier (m. 1936)
- Children: Vincent (b. 1939); François (b. 1942); Bernard (b. 1944); Jean-Louis (b. 1944)
- Education: École Libre des Sciences Politiques; University of Paris
- Occupation: Lawyer
- Awards: Legion of Honour; War Cross
- Website: Government profile site

Military service
- Allegiance: French Third Republic (1939-1940); Vichy France (1940-1942); Free France (1943-1945)
- Branch/service: French Army
- Years of service: 1939–1945
- Rank: Commissioner of the Republic; Lieutenant
- Unit: French Cavalry
- Battles/wars: World War II: Battle of France; Operation Torch; Operation Overlord; Operation Dragoon

Michel Jean-Pierre Debré (French: [miʃɛl dəbʁe]; 15 January 1912 – 2 August 1996) was the first Prime Minister of the French Fifth Republic. He is considered the "father" of the current Constitution of France. He served under President Charles de Gaulle from 1959 to 1962. In terms of political personality, Debré was intense and immovable and had a tendency for rhetorical extremism.

== Early life ==
Debré was born in Paris, the son of Jeanne-Marguerite (Debat-Ponsan) and Robert Debré, a well-known professor of medicine, who is today considered by many to be the founder of modern pediatrics. His maternal grandfather was academic painter Édouard Debat-Ponsan. Debré's father was Jewish, and his grandfather was a rabbi. Debré himself was Roman Catholic.

He studied at the Lycée Montaigne and then at the Lycée Louis-le-Grand, obtained a diploma from the École Libre des Sciences Politiques, and a PhD in Law from the University of Paris. He then became a Professor of Law at the University of Paris. He also joined the École des Officiers de Réserve de la Cavalerie (Reserve Cavalry-Officers School) in Saumur. In 1934, at the age of twenty-two, Debré passed the entrance exam and became a member of the Conseil d'État. In 1938, he joined the staff of the Economy Minister Paul Reynaud.

== Early career ==
In 1939, at the beginning of the Second World War, Debré was enlisted as a cavalry officer. He was taken prisoner in Artenay in June 1940 during the Battle of France but managed to escape in September. He returned to the Conseil d'État, now under the administration of the Vichy regime and was sworn in by Marshal Philippe Pétain. In 1942, he was promoted to maître des requêtes by the Minister of Justice. After the German invasion of the free zone in November 1942, Debré's political Pétainism disappeared, and in February 1943, he became involved in the French Resistance by joining the network Ceux de la Résistance (CDLR).

During the summer of 1943, General Charles de Gaulle gave Debré the task of making a list of prefects who would replace those of the Vichy regime after the Liberation. In August 1944, de Gaulle made him Commissaire de la République for Angers, and in 1945, the Provisional Government charged him with the task of reforming the French Civil Service. While doing so, he created the École nationale d'administration, a decision rooted in ideas formulated by Jean Zay before the war.

Under the Fourth Republic, Debré at first supported the Democratic and Socialist Union of the Resistance but defected to the Radical-Socialist Party—allegedly on the advice of de Gaulle, who reportedly told him and several other politicians, including Jacques Chaban-Delmas, "Allez au parti radical. C'est là que vous trouverez les derniers vestiges du sens de l'Etat (Go to the Radical Party. It's there that you will find the last vestiges of the meaning of the state)".

Debré then joined the Rally of the French People and was elected senator of Indre-et-Loire, a position that he held from 1948 to 1958. In 1957, he founded Le Courrier de la colère, a newspaper that fiercely defended French Algeria and called for the return to power of de Gaulle. In the 2 December 1957 issue, Debré wrote:

As long as Algeria is French land, as long as the law of Algeria is French, the battle for Algeria is a legal battle, the insurgency for Algeria is a legal insurgency.

The explicit appeal to the insurgency led the socialist politician Alain Savary to write, "In the case of the OAS insurgency, the soldiers are not the culprit; the culprit is Debré".

== Family ==
Michel Debré had four sons: Vincent Debré (1939–), businessman; François Debré (1942–2020), journalist; Bernard Debré (1944–2020), urologist and politician; and Bernard's fraternal twin, Jean-Louis Debré (1944–2025), politician. See Debré family.

== Government ==
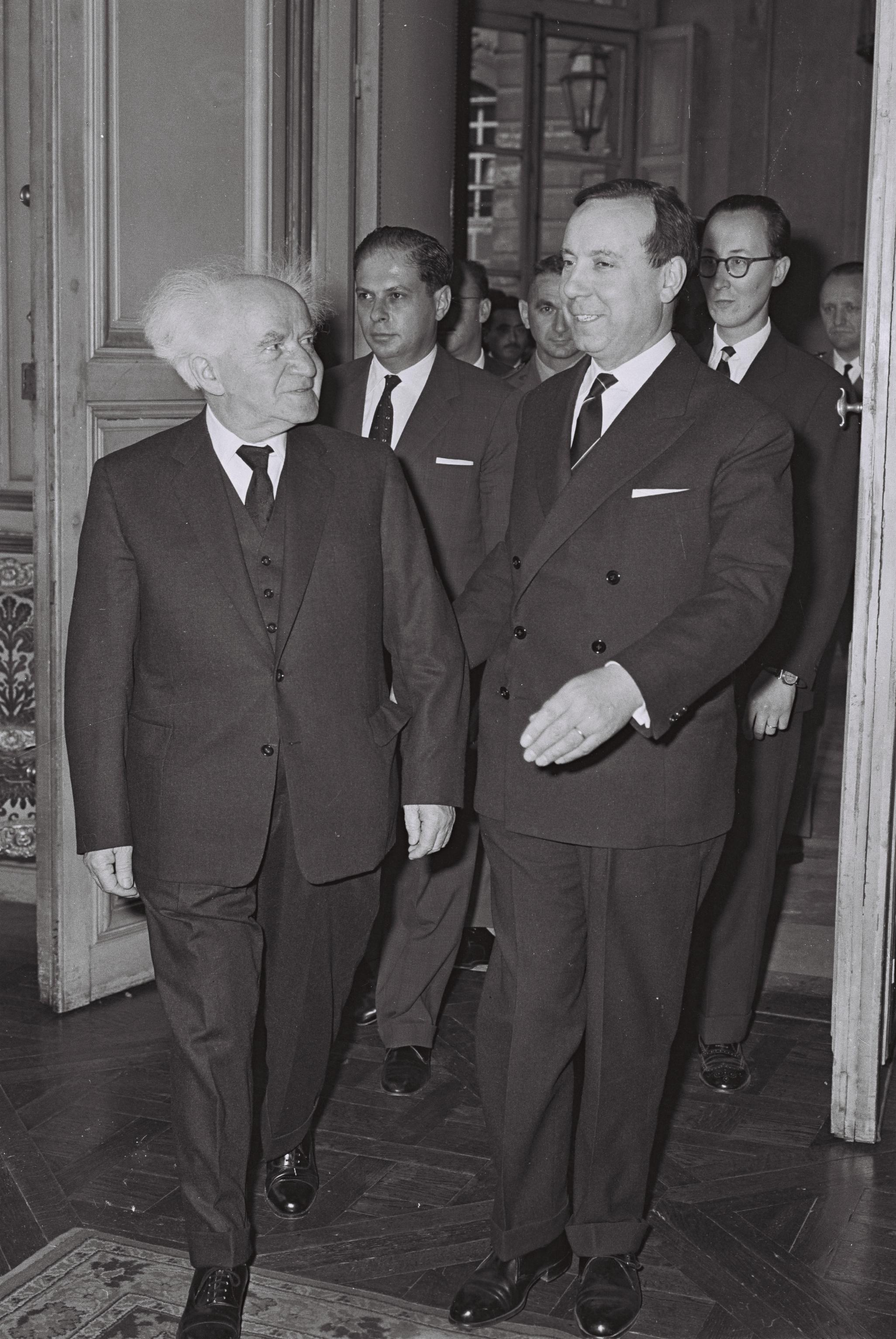
Michel Debré with David Ben-Gurion at Hôtel Matignon, on the first official visit of the Israeli Prime Minister to Paris. June, 1960

Michel Debré became the Garde des Sceaux and Minister of Justice in the cabinet of General de Gaulle on 1 June 1958. He played an important role in drafting the Constitution of the Fifth Republic, and on its acceptance he took up the new position of Prime Minister of France, which he held from 8 January 1959 to 1962.

After the 1962 Évian Accords referendum that ended the Algerian War and gave self-determination to Algeria was approved by a nearly ten-to-one margin, de Gaulle replaced Debré with Georges Pompidou. In November, during the parliamentary elections that followed the dissolution of the National Assembly, Debré tried to be elected as deputy for Indre-et-Loire. Defeated, in March 1963 he decided to go to Réunion, an island that he had visited for less than 24 hours on 10 July 1959, on a trip with President de Gaulle. The choice reflects Debré's fear that what remained of the French colonial empires would follow the path trodden by Algeria: that of independence for which he was not sympathetic.

Debré wanted to take action against the Communist Party of Réunion, which had been founded by Paul Vergès a few years earlier. The movement sought self-determination for the island and the removal of its position as an overseas department and had staged demonstrations on the island a few days earlier. He also noted that the invalidation of Gabriel Macé's election as Mayor of Saint-Denis rendered the post open to the opposition and so he took the decision to contest the election.

Debré returned to the government in 1966 as Economy and Finance Minister. After the May 1968 crisis, he became Foreign Minister and, one year later, served as Defence Minister under President Georges Pompidou. In that role, he became a hated figure of the left because of his determination to expropriate the land of 107 peasant farmers and shepherds on the Larzac plateau to extend an existing military base. The resulting civil disobedience campaign was ultimately victorious.

Considered as a guardian of the Gaullist orthodoxy, Debré was marginalised after the election of Valéry Giscard d'Estaing as President of France in 1974, whose foreign policy Debré criticised with virulence. In 1979, Debré took a major part in the Rally for the Republic (RPR) campaign against European federalism and was elected member of the European Parliament to defend the principle of the Europe of nations. However, Debré later accused Jacques Chirac, and the RPR moderated their speech. Debré was a dissident candidate in the 1981 presidential election but obtained only 1.6% of votes.

=== Politics in Réunion ===
Michel Debré arrived on the island of Réunion in April 1963 and succeeded in being elected Député for Saint-Denis on 6 May despite local opposition to the ordonnance Debré, a law that he had introduced in 1960 to allow civil servants in the overseas departments and territories of France to be recalled to Metropolitan France if they were suspected of disturbing public order. Supported by those who rejected autonomy, he immediately became the leader of the local right wing. That state of affairs would be challenged by Pierre Lagourgue during the next decade.

To justify the departmentalization of the island that occurred in 1946 and to preserve its inhabitants from the temptation of independence, Debré implemented an economic development policy and opened the island's first family planning center. He personally fought to get Paris to create a second secondary school on the south of the island, in Le Tampon, when at the time there was only one, the Lycée Leconte-de-Lisle, which catered for many thousands of inhabitants.

From 1968 to 1982, Debré forcibly relocated over 2,000 children from Réunion to France, to work as free labour in Creuse. The plight of those children, known as the Children of Creuse, was brought to light in 2002 when the Réunion exile Jean-Jacques Martial made a legal complaint against Debré, who had organised the controversial displacement, for "kidnapping of a minor, roundup and deportation". In 2005, a similar case was brought against the French Government by the Association of Réunion of Creuse.

== Political career ==
Governmental functions

- Keeper of the Seals, Minister of Justice: 1958–1959.
- Prime Minister: 1959–1962.
- Minister of Economy and Finance: 1966–1968.
- Minister of Foreign Affairs: 1968–1969.
- Minister of Defense: 1969–1973.

Electoral mandates

European Parliament

- Member of European Parliament: 1979–1980 (Resignation). Elected in 1979.

Senate of France

- Senator of Indre-et-Loire: 1948–1959 Became Prime minister in 1959. Elected in 1948, reelected in 1954.

National Assembly

- Member of the National Assembly of France for Réunion: 1963–1966 (Became minister in 1966), 1973–1988. Elected in 1963, reelected in 1967, 1968, 1973, 1978, 1981, 1986.

General Council

- General councillor of Indre-et-Loire: 1951–1970. Reelected in 1958, 1964.

Municipal Council

- Mayor of Amboise: 1966–1989. Reelected in 1971, 1977, 1983.
- Municipal councillor of Amboise: 1959–1989. Reelected in 1965, 1971, 1977, 1983.

=== Debré's Government, 8 January 1959 – 14 April 1962 ===
- Michel Debré – Prime Minister
- Maurice Couve de Murville – Minister of Foreign Affairs
- Pierre Guillaumat – Minister of Armies
- Jean Berthoin – Minister of the Interior
- Antoine Pinay – Minister of Finance and Economic Affairs
- Jean-Marcel Jeanneney – Minister of Commerce and Industry
- Paul Bacon – Minister of Labour
- Edmond Michelet – Minister of Justice
- André Boulloche – Minister of National Education
- Raymond Triboulet – Minister of Veteran Affairs
- André Malraux – Minister of Cultural Affairs
- Roger Houdet – Minister of Agriculture
- Robert Buron – Minister of Public Works and Transport
- Bernard Chenot – Minister of Public Health and Population
- Bernard Cornut-Gentille – Minister of Posts and Telecommunications
- Roger Frey – Minister of Information
- Pierre Sudreau – Minister of Construction

Changes

- 27 March 1959 – Robert Lecourt enters the Cabinet as Minister of Cooperation.
- 27 May 1959 – Henri Rochereau succeeds Houdet as Minister of Agriculture.
- 28 May 1959 – Pierre Chatenet succeeds Berthoin as Minister of the Interior.
- 23 December 1959 – Debré succeeds Boulloche as interim Minister of National Education.
- 13 January 1960 – Wilfrid Baumgartner succeeds Pinay as Minister of Finance and Economic Affairs.
- 15 January 1960 – Louis Joxe succeeds Debré as Minister of National Education
- 5 February 1960 – Pierre Messmer succeeds Guillaumat as Minister of Armies. Robert Lecourt becomes Minister of Overseas Departments and Territories and of the Sahara. His previous office of Minister of Cooperation is abolished. Michel Maurice-Bokanowski succeeds Cornut-Gentille as Minister of Posts and Telecommunications. Louis Terrenoire succeeds Frey as Minister of Information.
- 23 November 1960 – Louis Joxe becomes Minister of Algerian Affairs. Pierre Guillaumat succeeds Joxe as interim Minister of National Education.
- 20 February 1961 – Lucien Paye succeeds Guillaumat as Minister of National Education.
- 6 May 1961 – Roger Frey succeeds Chatenet as Minister of the Interior.
- 18 May 1961 – Jean Foyer enters the ministry as Minister of Cooperation.
- 24 August 1961 – Bernard Chenot succeeds Michelet as Minister of Justice. Joseph Fontanet succeeds Chenot as Minister of Public Health and Population. Edgard Pisani succeeds Rochereau as Minister of Agriculture. Louis Jacquinot succeeds Lecourt as Minister of Overseas Departments and Territories and Sahara. Terrenoire ceases to be Minister of Information, and the office is abolished.
- 19 January 1962 – Valéry Giscard d'Estaing succeeds Baumgartner as Minister of Finance and Economic Affairs.

Political offices
Preceded by Robert Lecourt	Minister of Justice; 1958–1959	Succeeded by Edmond Michelet
Preceded by Charles de Gaulle	Prime Minister of France; 1959–1962	Succeeded by Georges Pompidou
Preceded by Valéry Giscard d'Estaing	Minister of Economy and Finance; 1966–1968	Succeeded by Maurice Couve de Murville
Preceded by Maurice Couve de Murville	Minister of Foreign Affairs; 1966–1969	Succeeded by Maurice Schumann
Preceded by Pierre Messmer as Minister of the Armies	Minister of National Defence; 1969–1973	Succeeded by Robert Galley
