= Bernard Chenot =

French politician (1909–1995)

French Minister of Justice
- In office 24 August 1961 – 15 April 1962
- President: Charles de Gaulle
- Prime Minister: Michel Debré
- Preceded by: Edmond Michelet
- Succeeded by: Jean Foyer

Personal details
- Born: 20 May 1909 Paris, France
- Died: 5 June 1995 (aged 86) France

Bernard Chenot (20 May 1909, in Paris – 5 June 1995) was a French politician and senior official.

== Life ==
Bernard Chenot was the son of a Parisian barrister. He became a member of the Conseil d'Etat during the Third Republic, and worked in several government departments. He remained in his position under the Vichy government after 1940. Under the Fourth Republic he was director of the coal-fields of northern France for a while, and an official adviser to successive governments on economic matters.

He served under Charles de Gaulle as Minister of Health, and then, until 1962, as Minister of Justice. When Georges Pompidou became prime minister, Chenot replaced him on the Constitutional Council for two years. He then went into business for some time, returning to public service in 1971 as the vice-president of the Conseil d'Etat, retiring in 1978.

He also lectured at the Institut d'Etudes Politiques and wrote a number of books about politics; his publications included Etre ministre (1967), L'Hopital en question (1970) and Reflexions sur la cite (1981).
