= Robert Debré =

French physician (1882–1978)

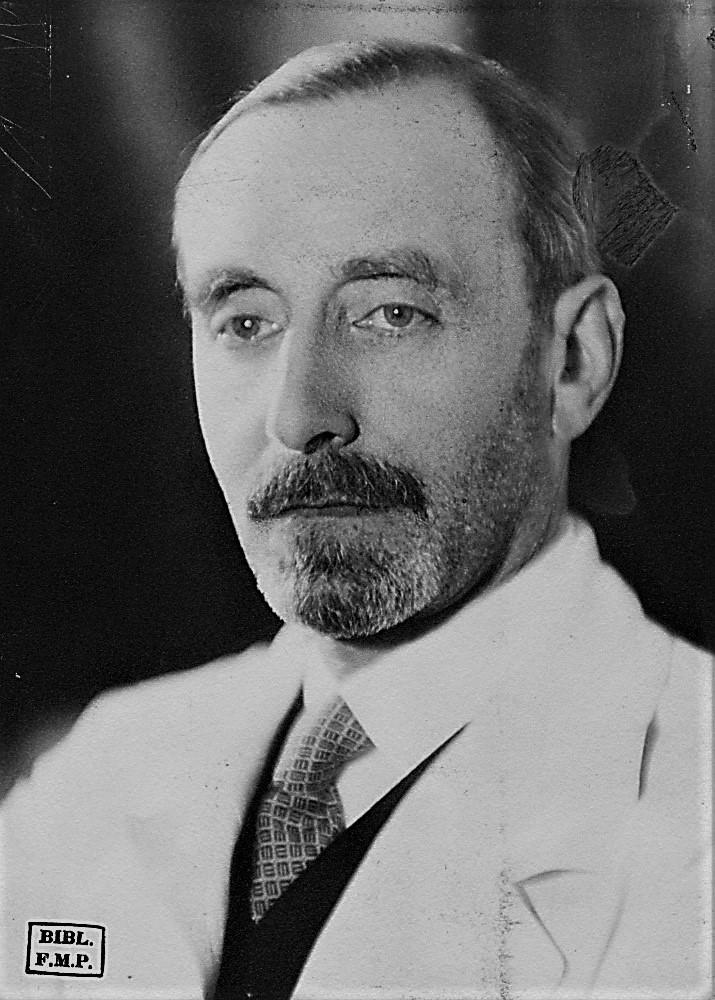
- Born: 7 December 1882; Sedan, France
- Died: 29 April 1978 (aged 95); Le Kremlin-Bicêtre, France
- Occupation: Pediatrician
- Relatives: Michel Debré (son); Jean-Louis Debré (grandson)

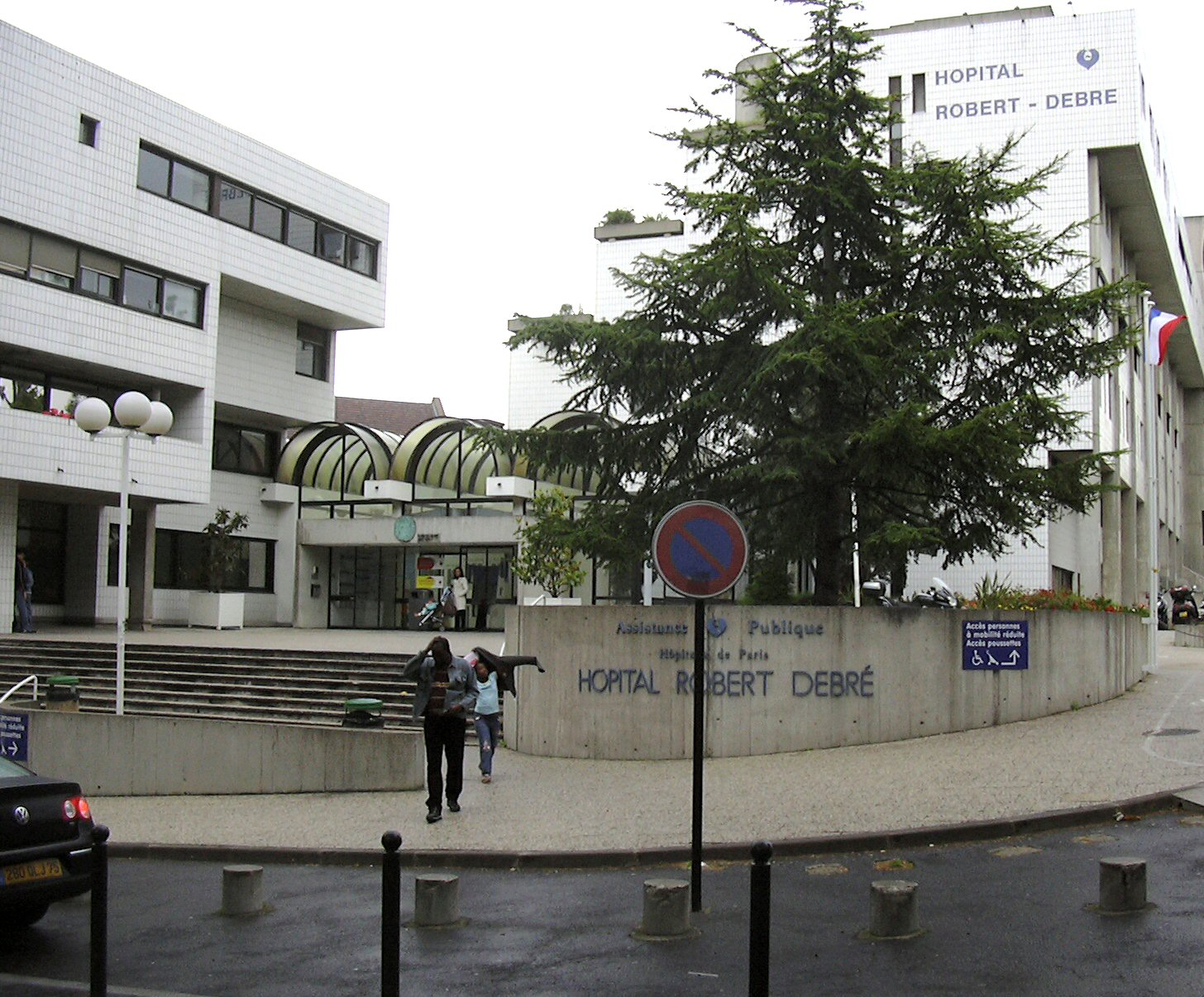
The Hôpital Robert-Debré, in Paris

Robert Anselme Debré (7 December 1882 – 29 April 1978) was a French physician (pediatrician) at Necker-Enfants Malades Hospital in Paris.

The largest pediatric hospital in Paris, the Robert-Debré Hospital - located in the North-East part of Paris (19th arrondissement) - is named after him.

Debré was born in Sedan, Ardennes. He is the father and grandfather of influential French government ministers; see Debré family.

A member of the Académie de Médecine, he was a colleague and close friend of professors Jean Quenu and Albert Besson, who in 1950 identified cats to be the natural reservoir of the Cat scratch disease. In 1946, he wrote, with Prof. Paul Rohmer, a famous manual entitled "Traité de Pathologie Infantile" (2500 pages, 2 volumes) which became a reference for a whole generation of pediatricians.

== See also ==
- Debré
- Henriette Gascuel
