= Minister of Algerian Affairs =

French government ministry

The Minister of Algerian Affairs (French: Ministre d’État aux Affaires Algériennes) or Minister of Algeria (French: Ministre de l'Algérie) was a ministerial post in the Government of France from its creation in 1858 until Algerian independence in 1962. The Ministry was created to supervise administration of French Algeria through a military governor general assisted by a civil minister. Previously, the governor general alone wielded civil and military jurisdiction. Notably, the Ministry was empowered to implement the Constantine Plan to economically and socially develop Algeria in preparation for their independence.

== Office holders ==
Name	Took office	Left office
Georges Catroux	1 February 1956	13 June 1957
Robert Lacoste	13 June 1957	14 April 1958
André Mutter	14 May 1958	1 June 1958
Charles de Gaulle	12 June 1958	9 January 1959
Louis Joxe	22 November 1960	28 November 1962
Jean de Broglie†	6 December 1962	8 January 1966

† As Secretary of State for Algerian affairs
