= Montlouis-sur-Loire =

- Commune
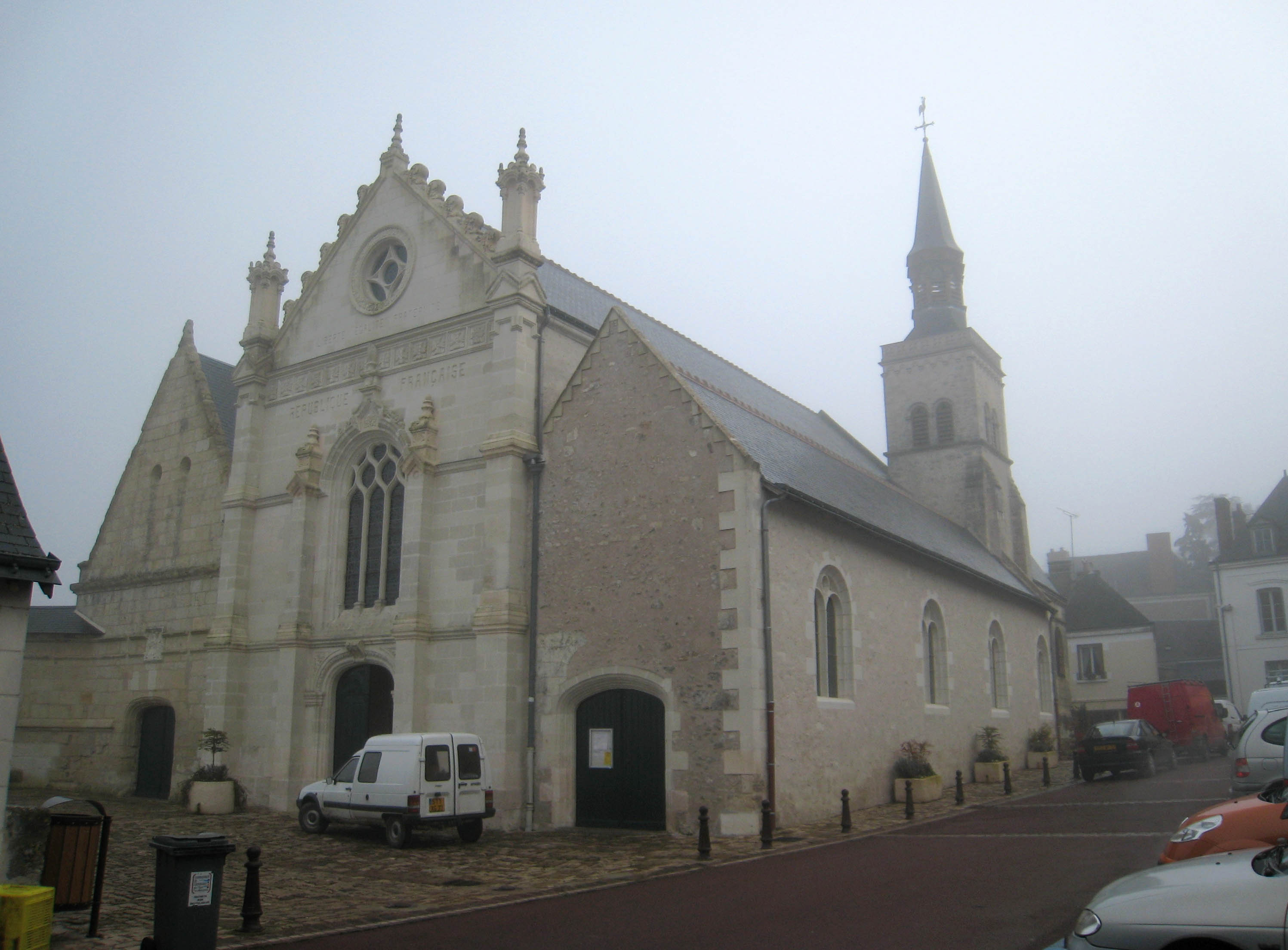
- The church of Saint-Laurent, in Montlouis-sur-Loire

- Coat of arms
- Location of Montlouis-sur-Loire
- Location within France Location within Centre-Val de Loire
- Coordinates: 47°23′21″N 0°49′41″E
- Country: France
- Region: Centre-Val de Loire
- Department: Indre-et-Loire
- Arrondissement: Tours
- Canton: Montlouis-sur-Loire

Government
  - Mayor (2020–2026): Vincent Morette
- Area^{1}: 24.55 km^{2} (9.48 sq mi)
- Highest elevation: 97 m (318 ft)
- Lowest elevation: 46 m (151 ft)
- Population (2023): 11,335
  - Density: 461.7/km^{2} (1,196/sq mi)
- Time zone: UTC+01:00 (CET)
  - Summer (DST): UTC+02:00 (CEST)
- INSEE/Postal code: 37156 /37270
- ^{1} French Land Register data, which excludes lakes, ponds, glaciers > 1 km^{2} (0.386 sq mi or 247 acres) and river estuaries.

Montlouis-sur-Loire (French pronunciation: [mɔ̃lwi syʁ lwaʁ]; lit. 'Montlouis-on-Loire') is a commune in the Indre-et-Loire department in central France.

It was mentioned in the 6th century as vicus montis Laudiacensis by Gregory of Tours.

== Population ==
Historical population

Year	Pop.	±% p.a.
1793	2,236	—
1800	2,571	+2.01%
1806	2,409	−1.08%
1821	2,296	−0.32%
1831	2,443	+0.62%
1836	2,379	−0.53%
1841	2,274	−0.90%
1846	2,326	+0.45%
1851	2,361	+0.30%
1856	2,166	−1.71%
1861	2,214	+0.44%
1866	2,190	−0.22%
1872	2,181	−0.07%
1876	2,175	−0.07%
1881	2,232	+0.52%
1886	2,247	+0.13%
1891	2,170	−0.69%
1896	2,053	−1.10%
1901	2,091	+0.37%

Year	Pop.	±% p.a.
1906	2,133	+0.40%
1911	2,127	−0.06%
1921	2,070	−0.27%
1926	2,039	−0.30%
1931	2,061	+0.21%
1936	2,115	+0.52%
1946	2,350	+1.06%
1954	2,710	+1.80%
1962	3,569	+3.50%
1968	4,169	+2.62%
1975	5,692	+4.55%
1982	6,932	+2.86%
1990	8,309	+2.29%
1999	9,657	+1.68%
2007	10,381	+0.91%
2012	10,643	+0.50%
2017	10,666	+0.04%
2023	11,335	+1.02%

Source: EHESS and INSEE (1968-2023)

== Events ==
Since 1987, the city hosts the month of September Jazz Festival in Touraine. In 2010, more than 20,000 people, 5 over a period of 10 days. To organize this event, an association was created in 1990 so that the festival can take its autonomy vis-à-vis the municipality. Today, about 200 volunteers involved in the organization.

== Sights ==
- Chateau of Bourdaisière: It currently houses the Conservatory of tomato (about 500 varieties).
- St. Lawrence Church: The original building was replaced late XI- XII start a single-nave church, which still remain the base of the tower and the choir vaulted in cul-de-four. The inscription "French Republic" was performed on the facade to 1881. On the left gable is visible a graffito of a barge, ex- voto Petty dating from the late 17th century. The church also has stained glass windows of the 20th century, one depicting the bombing of the bridge Montlouis -sur -Loire in May–June 1944, directed by the master glassmaker Fournier.
- The rectory, former mansion of the 16th century listed historical monument in 1927 would have sheltered the loves of Henri IV and Gabrielle d' Estrées. Ornate dormers and gables topped with sculpted seams of a shell, the building reflects the art of the Renaissance.
- Maison de la Loire: Museum dedicated to the Loire.
- The Heart city district: Great neighbourhood 'green' in the centre of the city consists of buildings for rental (social landlord) and the sale. Individual homes, businesses and a large media centre.
- The hiking trail GR 3, the pilgrimage to Compostela Via Turonensis and the circuit of the Loire by bike through Montlouis.
- Two railway bridges, built in 1846 and in 1989, crossing the Loire Montlouis height.

== See also ==
- Communes of the Indre-et-Loire department
