= Jacques Robert (jurist) =

French jurist (1928–2025)

2nd President of Panthéon-Assas University
- In office 1979–1984
- Preceded by: Berthold Goldman
- Succeeded by: Jean Boulouis

Personal details
- Born: 29 September 1928 Algiers, French Algeria
- Died: 28 May 2025 (aged 96)

Jacques Robert (29 September 1928 – 28 May 2025) was a French jurist, member of the Constitutional Council of France, director of the French-Japanese House in Tokyo, vice-president of the Venice Commission, honorary president of the University of Paris and president of Panthéon-Assas University from 1979 to 1984. He a professor at the universities of Algiers, Rabat, Grenoble, Paris, and Panthéon-Assas.

Robert died on 28 May 2025, at the age of 96.

== Works ==
- Les Violations de la liberté individuelle commises par l’Administration et le problème des responsabilités
- La Liberté religieuse et le régime des cultes
- Le Juge constitutionnel, juge des libertés
- La Garde de la République
- Enjeux du siècle : nos libertés
