= Georges Pompidou =

President of France from 1969 to 1974

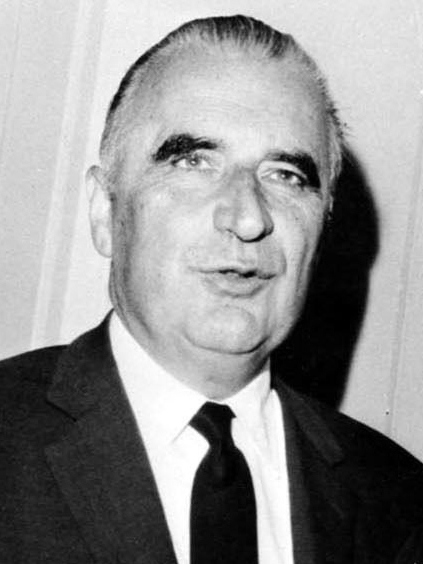
- Pompidou in 1969

President of France
- In office 20 June 1969 – 2 April 1974
- Prime Minister: Jacques Chaban-Delmas; Pierre Messmer
- Preceded by: Charles de Gaulle (Note: Alain Poher served as acting president from de Gaulle's resignation until Pompidou took office.)
- Succeeded by: Valéry Giscard d'Estaing (Note: Poher again served as acting president from Pompidou's death until Giscard d'Estaing took office.)

Prime Minister of France
- In office 14 April 1962 – 10 July 1968
- President: Charles de Gaulle
- Preceded by: Michel Debré
- Succeeded by: Maurice Couve de Murville

Member of the Constitutional Council
- In office 5 March 1959 – 14 April 1962
- Appointed by: Charles de Gaulle
- Preceded by: Office established
- Succeeded by: Bernard Chenot

Additional positions
- (see § Offices and distinctions)

Personal details
- Born: Georges Jean Raymond Pompidou; 5 July 1911 Montboudif, France
- Died: 2 April 1974 (aged 62) Paris, France
- Resting place: Orvilliers Cemetery; Orvilliers, France
- Party: Union of Democrats for the Republic (1968–1974)
- Other political affiliations: Union for the New Republic (before 1968)
- Spouse: Claude Cahour (m. 1935)
- Children: Alain
- Education: École Normale Supérieure; Sciences Po

Military service
- Branch/service: French Army
- Years of service: 1940
- Rank: Lieutenant
- Unit: 92nd Infantry Regiment
- Battles/wars: Second World War
- Awards: Croix de Guerre

Georges Jean Raymond Pompidou (/ˈpɒmpɪduː/ POMP-id-oo; French: [ʒɔʁʒ(ə) pɔ̃pidu]; 5 July 1911 – 2 April 1974) was President of France from 1969 until his death in 1974. He had previously served from 1962 to 1968 as Prime Minister of France under President Charles de Gaulle, with whom he was closely associated throughout his career.

In the context of the strong growth of the last years of the Trente Glorieuses, Pompidou continued De Gaulle's policy of modernisation, which was symbolised by the presidential use of the Concorde, the creation of large industrial groups and the launch of the high-speed train project (TGV). The government invested heavily in the automobile, agribusiness, steel, telecommunications, nuclear and aerospace sectors and also created the minimum wage (SMIC) and the Ministry of the Environment.

His foreign policy was pragmatic but in line with the Gaullist principle of French autonomy within the Western Bloc. It was marked by a warming of relations with Richard Nixon's United States, close relations with Leonid Brezhnev's Soviet Union, the launch of the 'snake in the tunnel' and the relaunching of European construction by facilitating the United Kingdom's entry to the EEC in contrast to de Gaulle's opposition. Pompidou died in office in 1974 of Waldenström's disease, a rare form of blood cancer.

An admirer of contemporary art, Pompidou's name remains known worldwide for the Centre Pompidou, which he initiated and which was inaugurated in 1977; it subsequently spread the name with its branches in Metz (France), Málaga (Spain), Brussels (Belgium) and Shanghai (China). A Georges Pompidou Museum is also dedicated to him in his hometown.

== Early life ==
The family of Georges Pompidou was of very modest origins. He was the grandson of farmers of modest means in Cantal on both his father's and his mother's side. His case is thus often cited as a typical example of social mobility in the Third Republic because of public schooling.

Georges Jean Raymond Pompidou was born on 5 July 1911 in the commune of Montboudif, in the department of Cantal, in south-central France. After his hypokhâgne at Lycée Pierre-de-Fermat and his khâgne at Lycée Louis-le-Grand, where he befriended the future Senegalese poet and statesman Léopold Sédar Senghor, Pompidou attended the École Normale Supérieure from which he graduated with a degree of agrégation in literature.

He first taught literature at the lycée Henri IV in Paris until he was hired in 1953 by Guy de Rothschild to work at Rothschild. In 1956, he was appointed the bank's general manager, a position that he held until 1962. Later, he was hired by Charles de Gaulle to manage the Anne de Gaulle Foundation for Down syndrome (de Gaulle's youngest daughter, Anne, had Down syndrome).

== Prime minister ==
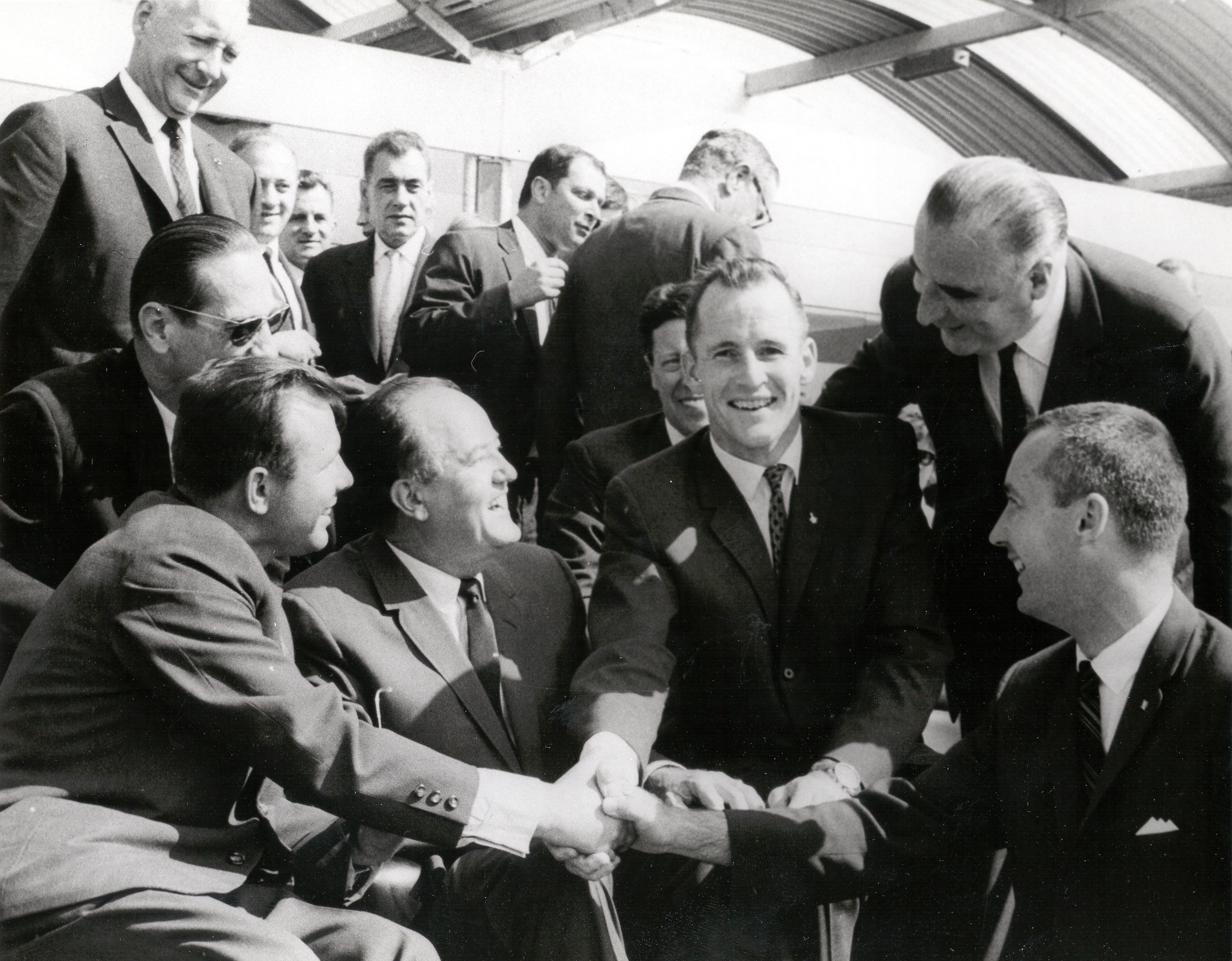
Pompidou (upper right) with US Vice President Hubert Humphrey, Soviet cosmonaut Yuri Gagarin and Gemini 4 astronauts at the 1965 Paris Air Show

Jacques Chirac served as an aide to Prime Minister Pompidou and recalled:

The man gave the appearance of being secretive, wily, a little cunning—which he was, to a degree. However, it was primarily his intelligence, culture, and competence that conferred indisputable authority on him and commanded respect.... I remember his untamed eyebrows, his penetrating, very kindly gaze, his perceptive smile, full of humour and mischievousness, his voice with its wonderful low, warm, gravelly tone, and a figure that was both powerful and elegant. Naturally reserved, little given to emotional outbursts, Pompidou did not forge very close ties with his colleagues.

He served as prime minister of France under de Gaulle after Michel Debré resigned, from 14 April 1962 to 10 July 1968, and to this day is the longest serving French prime minister under the Fifth Republic. His nomination was controversial because he was not a member of the National Assembly. In October 1962, he was defeated in a vote of no-confidence, but de Gaulle dissolved the National Assembly. This was the last time a French government fell to a confidence vote until the collapse of Michel Barnier's government in 2024. The Gaullists won the legislative election and Pompidou was reappointed as prime minister.

In 1964, he was faced with a miners' strike. He led the 1967 legislative campaign of the Union of Democrats for the Fifth Republic to a narrow victory. Pompidou was widely regarded as being responsible for the peaceful resolution of the student uprising of May 1968. His strategy was to break the coalition of students and workers by negotiating with the trade-unions and employers (Grenelle conference).

During the events of May 1968, disagreements arose between Pompidou and de Gaulle. Pompidou did not understand why the President did not inform him of his departure to Baden-Baden on 29 May. Their relationship, until then very good, would be strained from then on. Pompidou led and won the 1968 legislative campaign, overseeing a tremendous victory of the Gaullist Party. He then resigned. Nevertheless, in part due to his actions during the May 1968 crisis, he appeared as the natural successor to de Gaulle. Pompidou announced his candidature for the Presidency in January 1969.

In social policy, Pompidou's tenure as prime minister witnessed the establishment of the National Employment Fund in 1963 to counter the negative effects on employment caused by industrial restructuring.

== Presidency ==
After the failure of the 1969 constitutional referendum, de Gaulle resigned and Pompidou was elected president of France. In the general election of 15 June 1969, he defeated the centrist president of the Senate and acting president Alain Poher by a wide margin (58% to 42%). Though a Gaullist, Pompidou was more pragmatic than de Gaulle, notably facilitating the accession of the United Kingdom to the European Community on 1 January 1973. He embarked on an industrialisation plan and initiated the Arianespace project, as well as the TGV project, and furthered the French civilian nuclear programme. He was sceptical about the "New Society" programme of his prime minister, Jacques Chaban-Delmas. In 1972, he replaced Chaban-Delmas with Pierre Messmer, a more conservative Gaullist. While the left-wing opposition organised itself and proposed a Common Programme before the 1973 legislative election, Pompidou widened his presidential majority by including Centrist pro-European parties. In addition, he paid special attention to regional and local needs in order to strengthen his political party, the UDR (Union des Democrates pour la Ve République), which he made a central and lasting force in the Gaullist movement.

=== Foreign affairs ===
The United States was eager to restore positive relations with France after de Gaulle's departure from office. New US President Richard Nixon and his top adviser Henry Kissinger admired Pompidou; the politicians were in agreement on most major policy issues. The United States offered to help the French nuclear programme. Economic difficulties, however, arose following the Nixon Shock and the 1973–1975 recession, particularly over the role of the American dollar as the medium for world trade.

Pompidou sought to maintain good relations with the newly independent former French colonies in Africa, relying on such powerful figures as Jacques Foccart and René Journiac who maintained informal networks with African strongmen. In 1971, he visited Mauritania, Senegal, Ivory Coast, Cameroon, and Gabon. He brought a message of cooperation and financial assistance, but without the traditional paternalism. More broadly, he made an effort to foster closer relations with North African and Middle Eastern countries in order to develop a hinterland including all nations bordering the Mediterranean.

=== Modernising Paris ===
Pompidou's time in office was marked by constant efforts to modernise France's capital city. He spearheaded construction of a modern art museum, the Centre Beaubourg (renamed Centre Pompidou after his death), on the edge of the Marais area of Paris. Other attempts at modernisation included tearing down the open-air markets at Les Halles and replacing them with the shopping mall of the same name, building the Montparnasse Tower, and constructing an expressway on the right bank of the Seine.

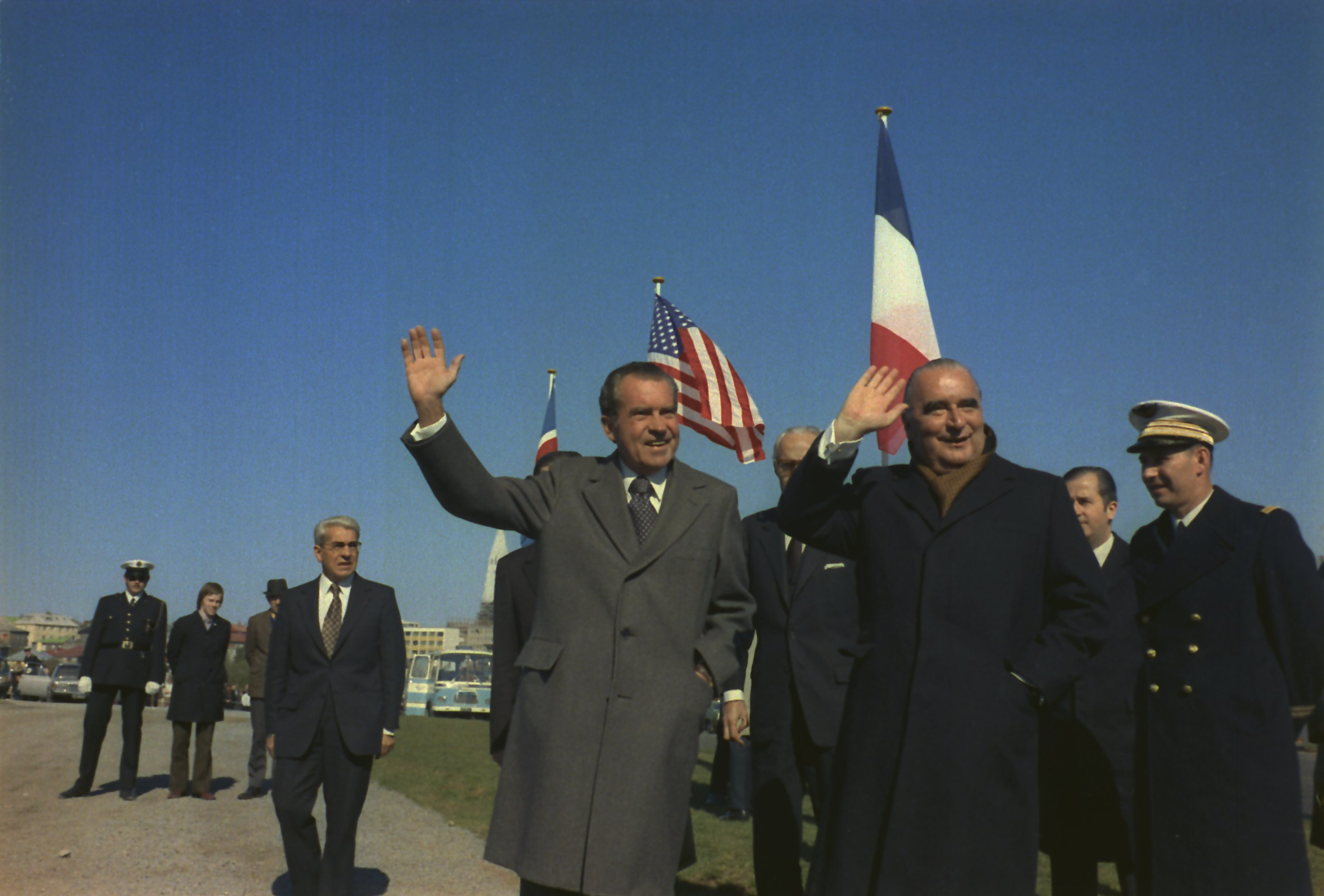
Pompidou with US president Richard Nixon in Reykjavík, 31 May 1973

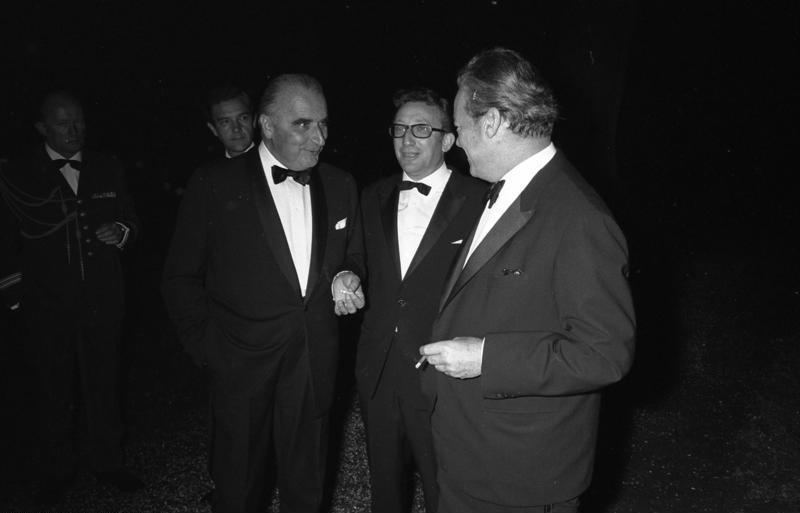
Pompidou with West German chancellor Willy Brandt in Cologne, 3 July 1972

== Death in office ==
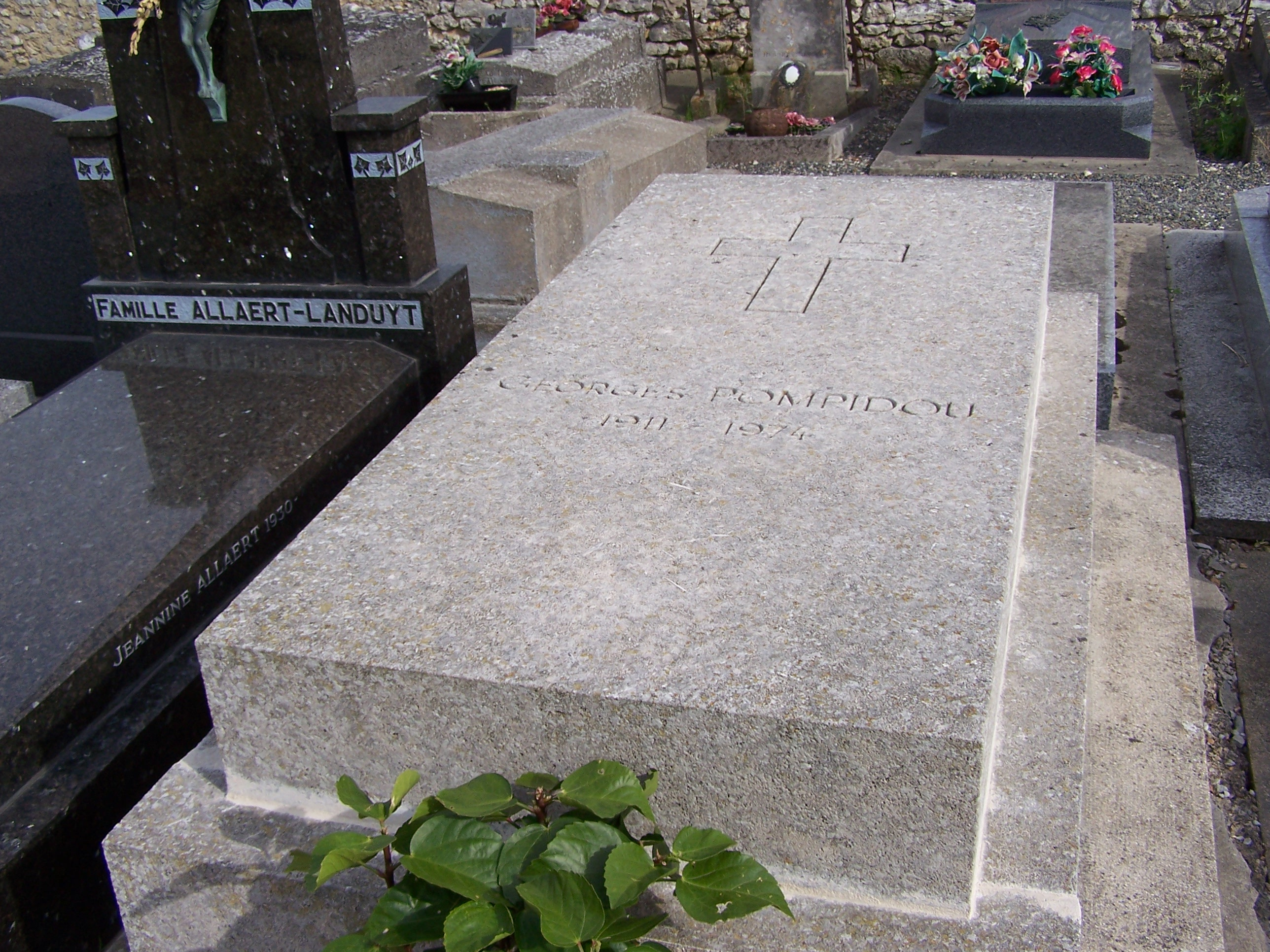
The grave of Georges and Claude Pompidou in Orvilliers

While still in office, Pompidou died on 2 April 1974 at his apartment, from Waldenström macroglobulinemia. Although his illness had not been disclosed and the government officially denied any health problems, there were reports of ill health and speculation of possible cancer during his last year in office. However, even on the day of his death, Pompidou had a visit scheduled from Rwandan President Grégoire Kayibanda.

His body was buried on 4 April, in the churchyard of Orvilliers, where he had bought an old baker's house which he turned into a weekend home. The official memorial service for him was held at Notre-Dame de Paris with 3,000 dignitaries in attendance, including foreign heads of state. A national day of mourning was declared for April 6, and entertainment and cultural events were canceled, theatres and schools closed.

A controversy arose surrounding the secrecy kept over Pompidou's illness, and the political class agreed that future presidents would have to provide reports on the state of their health; however, President François Mitterrand, who had pledged during his 1981 campaign to publish regular health bulletins, would also conceal the severity of his cancer during his presidency.

== Personal life ==
Pompidou was married to Claude Cahour, who would outlive him by more than thirty years. The couple adopted a son, Alain Pompidou, who went on to serve as a Member of the European Parliament and, later, as president of the European Patent Office.

== Works ==
- Anthologie de la Poésie Française, Livre de Poche/Hachette, 1961
- Le Nœud gordien, éd. Plon, 1974
- Entretiens et discours, deux vol., éd. Plon, 1975
- Pour rétablir une vérité, éd. Flammarion, 1982

== Awards and honours ==
Presidential standard of Georges Pompidou

=== French honours ===
Legion of Honour

- Grand Master (1969 to 1974, as president of the republic)
- Grand Cross (1969)
- Officer (1957)
- Knight (1948)

National Order of Merit

- Grand Master (1969 to 1974, as president of the republic)
- Grand Cross (1969)

=== Foreign honours ===
- – Grand Cross of the Order of St. Olav (Norway, 1962)
- – Knight Grand Cross of the Order of St. Sylvester (Vatican City, 1964)
- – Knight Grand Cross of the Sovereign Military Order of Malta (1969)
- – Knight Grand Cross of the Order of the Netherlands Lion (Nederland, 1969)
- – Grand Cordon of the Order of Leopold (Belgium, 1972)
- – First Class of the Star of the Republic of Indonesia (Indonesia, 1972)
- – Knight of the Order of the Gold Lion of the House of Nassau (Luxembourg, 1972)
- – Grand Cross of the Order of Polonia Restituta (Poland, 1972)
- – Honorary Knight Grand Cross of the Order of the Bath (United Kingdom, 1972)
- – Grand Cordon of the Order of Independence (Tunisia, 1972)
- – Knight Grand Cross with Collar of the Order of Merit of the Italian Republic (Italy, 1973)

=== Other honors ===
He was awarded an honorary doctorate from the University of Delhi during his tenure as prime minister.

== See also ==
- Centre Georges Pompidou
- Lycée Français International Georges Pompidou – a French school in Dubai and Sharjah, United Arab Emirates
- France's neocolonialism

== Notes ==
Legal offices
New office	Member of the Constitutional Council; 1959–1962	Succeeded by Bernard Chenot
National Assembly of France
Preceded by Jean Sagette	Member of the National Assembly for Cantal's 2nd constituency 1967; 1968–1969	Succeeded by Jean Sagette
Preceded by Jean Sagette	Member of the National Assembly for Cantal's 2nd constituency 1967; 1968–1969	Succeeded by Pierre Raynal
Political offices
Preceded by Michel Debré	Prime Minister of France; 1962–1968	Succeeded by Maurice Couve de Murville
Preceded by Charles de Gaulle	President of France; 1969–1974	Succeeded by Valéry Giscard d'Estaing
Regnal titles
Preceded by Charles de Gaulle	Co-Prince of Andorra; 1969–1974; Served alongside: Ramon Malla Call, Joan Martí i Alanis	Succeeded by Valéry Giscard d'Estaing
Catholic Church titles
Preceded by Charles de Gaulle	Honorary Canon of the Archbasilica of St. John Lateran; 1969–1974	Succeeded by Valéry Giscard d'Estaing
