= Debré family =

The Debré family is a French family including several prominent politicians and physicians. The family's ancestor, rabbi Simon Debré, was born in Westhoffen, Alsace. His ancestors came from Harburg, Bavaria

Simon Debré (1854–1939), rabbi
x 1882 Marianne Trenel (1860–1949)
│
├──> Robert Debré (1882–1978), physician 
│    x 1908 Jeanne Debat-Ponsan (1879–1929), daughter of Édouard Debat-Ponsan (1847 - 1913)
│    │
│    ├──> Michel Debré (1912–1996), politician  
│    │     x 1936 Anne-Marie Lemaresquier (1912-)
│    │     │
│    │     ├──> Vincent Debré (1939-), businessman
│    │     │     x Isabelle de Lacroix-Vaubois (1957-)
│    │     │
│    │     ├──> François Debré (1942-2020), journalist
│    │     │    │
│    │     │    └──> Constance Debré, novelist 
│    │     ├──> Bernard Debré (1944-2020), physician and politician
│    │     │  
│    │     │
│    │     └──> Jean-Louis Debré (1944-2025), politician
│    │          │
│    │          └──> Guillaume Debré, journalist 
│    ├──> Claude Debré (1913- ), physician
│    │    x 1942 Philippe Monod-Broca (1918–2006), surgeon
│    │ 
│    └──> Olivier Debré (1920–1999), painter
│       
│
└──> Claire Debré (1888–1972)
     x 1907 Anselme Schwartz (1872–1957), surgeon and member of the Académie des sciences
     │
     └──> Laurent Schwartz (1915–2002), mathematician
