= List of education ministers of France =

This page is a list of French education ministers.

A governmental position overseeing public education was first created in France in 1802. Following the various regime changes in France in the first decades of the 19th century, the position changed official status and name a number of times before the position of Minister of Public Instruction was created in 1828. For much of its history, the position was combined with that of Minister of Public Worship, who dealt with issues related to the Roman Catholic Church, except in instances where the Minister of Public Instruction was a Protestant. The position has also occasionally been combined with Minister of Sports and Minister of Youth Affairs. In 1932, the office's title was changed to Minister of National Education, although it was briefly changed back in 1940–1941, and was renamed Minister of Education during the presidency of Valéry Giscard d'Estaing (1974–1981).

== Administrators (various titles) of Public Instruction or the University, 1802–1828 ==
Minister	Began	Ended
Antoine François Fourcroy (Directeur général de l'Instruction publique)	14 September 1802	17 March 1808
Louis de Fontanes (Grand maître de l'Université)	17 March 1808	17 February 1815
Louis-François de Bausset (Président du Conseil royal de l'Instruction publique)	17 February 1815	20 March 1815
Bernard Étienne Germain de la Ville sur Illon (Grand maître de l'Université impériale)	20 March 1815	9 May 1815
Charles-François Lebrun, duc de Plaisance (Grand maître de l'Université impériale)	9 May 1815	15 August 1815
Pierre-Paul Royer-Collard (Président de la commission de l'Instruction publique)	15 August 1815	1818
Frédéric Cuvier (Grand maître de l'Université)	13 September 1819	1 November 1820
Élie Decazes (Président de la commission de l'Instruction publique)	29 December 1818	21 February 1820
Joseph Jérôme, Comte Siméon (Président de la commission de l'Instruction publique)	21 February 1820	4 October 1820
Joseph Louis Joachim Lainé (Président du Conseil royal de l'Instruction publique)	4 October 1820	21 December 1820
Joseph Louis Joachim Lainé	21 December 1820	31 July 1821
Jacques Joseph Guillaume François Pierre Corbière (Président du Conseil royal de l'Instruction publique)	31 July 1821	1 June 1822
Frédéric Cuvier (Président par intérim du Conseil royal de l'Instruction publique)	1 June 1822	26 August 1824
Denis-Luc Frayssinous (Grand maître de l'Université royale)	26 August 1824	1 February 1828
Denis-Luc Frayssinous (Ministre des Affaires ecclésiastiques et de l'Instruction publique)	1 February 1828	10 February 1828

== Ministers of Public Instruction, 1828–1932 ==
Minister	Began	Ended
Antoine François Henri Lefebvre de Vatimesnil	10 February 1828	8 August 1829
Guillaume Isidore, comte de Montbel	8 August 1829	18 November 1829
Martial, comte de Guernon-Ranville	18 November 1829	31 July 1830
François Guizot	31 July 1830	1 August 1830
Louis, baron Bignon	1 August 1830	11 August 1830
Achille Léonce Victor Charles, duc de Broglie	11 August 1830	2 November 1830
Joseph Mérilhou	2 November 1830	27 November 1830
Félix Barthe	27 November 1830	13 March 1831
Marthe Camille Bachasson, comte de Montalivet	13 March 1831	30 April 1832
Louis Gaspard Amédée, baron Girod de l'Ain	30 April 1832	11 October 1832
François Guizot	11 October 1832	10 November 1834
Jean-Baptiste Teste	10 November 1834	18 November 1834
François Guizot	18 November 1834	22 February 1836
Privat Joseph Claramont, comte Pelet de la Lozère	22 February 1836	6 September 1836
François Guizot	6 September 1836	15 April 1837
Narcisse Achille de Salvandy	15 April 1837	31 March 1839
Narcisse Parant	31 March 1839	12 May 1839
Abel-François Villemain	12 May 1839	1 March 1840
Victor Cousin	1 March 1840	29 October 1840
Abel-François Villemain	29 October 1840	1 February 1845
Narcisse Achille de Salvandy	1 February 1845	24 February 1848
Hippolyte Carnot	24 February 1848	5 July 1848
Achille Tenaille de Vaulabelle	5 July 1848	13 October 1848
Alexandre Pierre Freslon	13 October 1848	20 December 1848
Alfred Frédéric, comte de Falloux	20 December 1848	31 October 1849
Marie Louis Pierre Félix Esquirou de Parieu	31 October 1849	24 January 1851
Charles Giraud	24 January 1851	10 April 1851
Marie Jean Pierre Pie Frédéric Dombidau de Crouseilhes	10 April 1851	26 October 1851
Charles Giraud	26 October 1851	3 December 1851
Hippolyte Fortoul	3 December 1851	7 June 1856
Gustave Rouland	13 August 1856	23 June 1863
Victor Duruy	23 June 1863	17 July 1869
Louis Olivier Bourbeau	17 July 1869	2 January 1870
Émile Alexis Segris	2 January 1870	14 April 1870
Maurice Richard	14 April 1870	15 May 1870
Jacques Philippe Mège	15 May 1870	10 August 1870
Jules Louis Joseph Brame	10 August 1870	4 September 1870
Jules Simon	5 September 1870	17 May 1873
William Henry Waddington	18 May 1873	25 May 1873
Anselme Batbie	25 May 1873	26 November 1873
Oscar Bardi de Fourtou	26 November 1873	22 May 1874
Arthur de Cumont	22 May 1874	10 March 1875
Henri-Alexandre Wallon	10 March 1875	9 March 1876
William Henry Waddington	9 March 1876	17 May 1877
Joseph Brunet	17 May 1877	23 November 1877
Hervé Faye	23 November 1877	13 December 1877
Agénor Bardoux	13 December 1877	4 February 1879
Jules Ferry	4 February 1879	14 November 1881
Paul Bert	14 November 1881	30 January 1882
Jules Ferry	30 January 1882	7 August 1882
Jules Duvaux	7 August 1882	21 February 1883
Jules Ferry	21 February 1883	20 November 1883
Armand Fallières	20 November 1883	6 April 1885
René Goblet	6 April 1885	11 December 1886
Marcellin Berthelot	11 December 1886	30 May 1887
Eugène Spuller	30 May 1887	12 December 1887
Léopold Faye	12 December 1887	3 April 1888
Édouard Lockroy	3 April 1888	22 February 1889
Armand Fallières	22 February 1889	17 March 1890
Léon Bourgeois	17 March 1890	6 December 1892
Charles Dupuy	6 December 1892	4 April 1893
Raymond Poincaré	4 April 1893	3 December 1893
Eugène Spuller	3 December 1893	30 May 1894
Georges Leygues	30 May 1894	26 January 1895
Raymond Poincaré	26 January 1895	1 November 1895
Émile Combes	1 November 1895	29 April 1896
Alfred Rambaud	29 April 1896	28 June 1898
Léon Bourgeois	28 June 1898	1 November 1898
Georges Leygues	1 November 1898	7 June 1902
Joseph Chaumié	7 June 1902	24 January 1905
Jean-Baptiste Bienvenu-Martin	24 January 1905	14 March 1906
Aristide Briand	14 March 1906	4 January 1908
Gaston Doumergue	4 January 1908	3 November 1910
Maurice Faure	3 November 1910	2 March 1911
Théodore Steeg	2 March 1911	14 January 1912
Gabriel Guist'hau	14 January 1912	21 January 1913
Théodore Steeg	21 January 1913	22 March 1913
Louis Barthou	22 March 1913	9 December 1913
René Viviani	9 December 1913	9 June 1914
Arthur Dessoye	9 June 1914	13 June 1914
Victor Augagneur	13 June 1914	3 August 1914
Albert Sarraut	3 August 1914	29 October 1915
Paul Painlevé	29 October 1915	12 December 1916
René Viviani	12 December 1916	20 March 1917
Théodore Steeg	20 March 1917	12 September 1917
Charles Daniel-Vincent	12 September 1917	16 November 1917
Louis Lafferre	16 November 1917	27 November 1919
Léon Bérard	27 November 1919	20 January 1920
André Honorrat	20 January 1920	16 January 1921
Léon Bérard	16 January 1921	29 March 1924
Henry de Jouvenel	29 March 1924	9 June 1924
Adolphe Landry	9 June 1924	14 June 1924
François Albert	14 June 1924	17 April 1925
Anatole de Monzie	17 April 1925	11 October 1925
Yvon Delbos	11 October 1925	28 November 1925
Édouard Daladier	28 November 1925	9 March 1926
Lucien Lamoureux	9 March 1926	23 June 1926
Bertrand Nogaro	23 June 1926	19 July 1926
Édouard Daladier	19 July 1926	23 July 1926
Édouard Herriot	23 July 1926	11 November 1928
Pierre Marraud	11 November 1928	21 February 1930
Jean Durand	21 February 1930	2 March 1930
Pierre Marraud	2 March 1930	13 December 1930
Camille Chautemps	13 December 1930	27 January 1931
Mario Roustan	27 January 1931	3 June 1932

== Ministers of National Education, 1932–present ==
Minister	Began	Ended
Anatole de Monzie	3 June 1932	30 January 1934
Aimé Berthod	30 January 1934	8 November 1934
André Mallarmé	8 November 1934	1 June 1935
Mario Roustan	1 June 1935	7 June 1935
Philippe Marcombes	7 June 1935	13 June 1935
Mario Roustan	17 June 1935	24 January 1936
Henri Guernut	24 January 1936	4 June 1936
Jean Zay	4 June 1936	10 September 1939
Yvon Delbos	13 September 1939	21 March 1940
Albert Sarraut	21 March 1940	5 June 1940
Yvon Delbos	5 June 1940	16 June 1940
Albert Rivaud	16 June 1940	12 July 1940
Émile Mireaux (Minister of Public Instruction)	12 July 1940	6 September 1940
Georges Ripert (Minister of Public Instruction)	6 September 1940	13 December 1940
Jacques Chevalier (Minister of Public Instruction)	13 December 1940	23 February 1941
Jérôme Carcopino	25 February 1941	18 April 1942
Abel Bonnard	18 April 1942	19 August 1944
René Capitant	19 August 1944	21 November 1945
Paul Giacobbi	21 November 1945	26 January 1946
Marcel Edmond Naegelen	26 January 1946	12 February 1948
Édouard Depreux	12 February 1948	26 July 1948
Yvon Delbos	26 July 1948	5 September 1948
Michel Tony-Révillon	5 September 1948	11 September 1948
Yvon Delbos	11 September 1948	2 July 1950
André Morice	2 July 1950	12 July 1950
Pierre-Olivier Lapie	12 July 1950	11 August 1952
André Marie	11 August 1952	19 June 1954
Jean Berthoin	19 June 1954	1 February 1956
René Billères	1 February 1956	14 May 1958
Jacques Bordeneuve	14 May 1958	1 June 1958
Jean Berthoin	1 June 1958	8 January 1959
André Boulloche	8 January 1959	23 December 1959
Michel Debré	23 December 1959	15 January 1960
Louis Joxe	15 January 1960	23 November 1960
Pierre Guillaumat	23 November 1960	20 February 1961
Lucien Paye	20 February 1961	15 April 1962
Pierre Sudreau	15 April 1962	15 October 1962
Louis Joxe	15 October 1962	28 November 1962
Christian Fouchet	28 November 1962	6 April 1967
Alain Peyrefitte	6 April 1967	30 May 1968
François-Xavier Ortoli	30 May 1968	10 July 1968
Edgar Faure	10 July 1968	23 June 1969
Olivier Guichard	23 June 1969	7 July 1972
Joseph Fontanet	7 July 1972	28 May 1974
René Haby (Minister of Education)	28 May 1974	5 April 1978
Christian Beullac (Minister of Education)	5 April 1978	22 May 1981
Alain Savary	22 May 1981	19 July 1984
Jean-Pierre Chevènement	19 July 1984	20 March 1986
René Monory	20 March 1986	12 May 1988
Lionel Jospin	12 May 1988	2 April 1992
Jack Lang	2 April 1992	29 March 1993
François Bayrou	29 March 1993	4 June 1997
Claude Allègre	4 June 1997	28 March 2000
Jack Lang	28 March 2000	7 May 2002
Luc Ferry	7 May 2002	31 March 2004
François Fillon	31 March 2004	2 June 2005
Gilles de Robien	2 June 2005	15 May 2007
Xavier Darcos	18 May 2007	23 June 2009
Luc Chatel	23 June 2009	16 May 2012
Vincent Peillon	16 May 2012	31 March 2014
Benoît Hamon	2 April 2014	25 August 2014
Najat Vallaud-Belkacem	26 August 2014	17 May 2017
Jean-Michel Blanquer	17 May 2017	20 May 2022
Pap Ndiaye	20 May 2022	20 July 2023
Gabriel Attal	20 July 2023	9 January 2024
Amélie Oudéa-Castéra	11 January 2024	08 February 2024
Nicole Belloubet	08 February 2024	21 September 2024
Anne Genetet	21 September 2024	23 December 2024
Élisabeth Borne	23 December 2024	12 October 2025
Édouard Geffray	12 October 2025	-
