= Bardoux =

Bardoux may refer to:

== People with the surname ==
- Agénor Bardoux (1829-1897), French politician
- Jacques Bardoux (1874-1959), French politician
- Olivier Bardoux, French spearfisher

== Locations ==
- Saint-Bardoux, small town in France.
