= Mantoux =

Mantoux may refer to:

- Charles Mantoux (1877–1947), French physician
- Étienne Mantoux (1913–1945), French economist
- Paul Mantoux (1877–1956), French historian
- Mantoux test, a method of testing for tuberculosis
