= Émile Mireaux =

French economist (1885 – 1969)

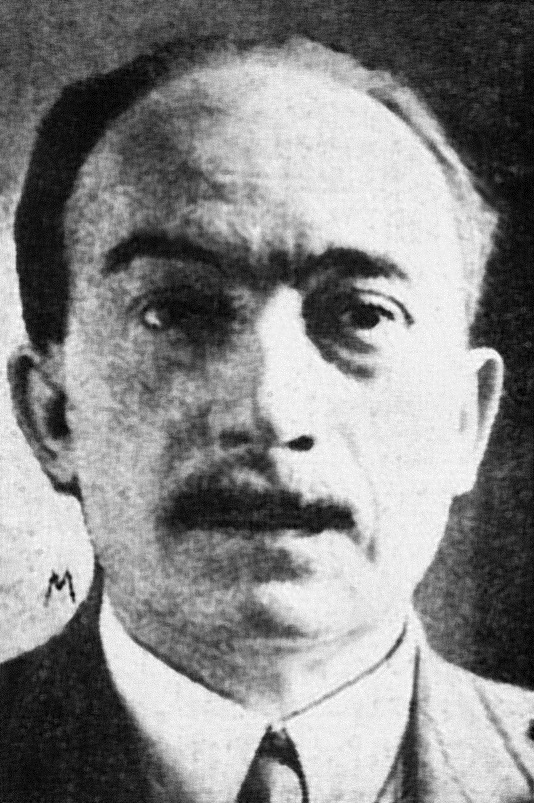
- Mireaux on 27 August 1940

Senator for Hautes-Pyrénées
- In office 14 January 1936 – 31 December 1944

Minister of Public Instruction and Fine Arts
- In office 12 July 1940 – 5 September 1940
- Prime Minister: Pierre Laval
- Preceded by: Albert Rivaud
- Succeeded by: Georges Ripert

Personal details
- Born: 21 August 1885 Mont-de-Marsan, Landes, France
- Died: 27 December 1969 (aged 84) Paris, France
- Occupation: Economist, politician and literary historian

Émile Mireaux (21 August 1885 – 27 December 1969) was a French economist, journalist, politician and literary historian. In the 1930s, he edited Le Temps and contributed to other right-leaning journals. He became a senator in 1936, and briefly served as a minister in 1940. From 1940 until his death, he held a chair in political economy, statistics and finance at the Académie des Sciences Morales et Politiques.

== Early years ==
Émile Mireaux was born in Mont-de-Marsan, Landes, on 21 August 1885. His father was of Pyrenean origin, was an ordnance officer under General Georges Ernest Boulanger and was serving in the Mont-de-Marsan garrison. His father died when Émile was three years old. After this Émile lived as a boarder at Tarbes and then as an officer's son at the Prytanée National Militaire in La Flèche, where he developed a love of rugby football.

Mireaux was a brilliant secondary school student. He entered the École Normale Supérieure in 1906, and graduated in History and Geography in 1910. He taught at high schools in Alençon and Orléans, and at the Institut Français in Madrid in 1913–14. During World War I (1914–18) he was mobilized as an infantry officer in August 1914 and served until March 1919. He was wounded twice, cited three times and made a knight of the Legion of Honour.

== 1920s ==
Mireaux was a professor at the preparation center for the grandes écoles in 1919 and 1920, then prepared students for their agrégation at the École Normale Supérieure from 1920 to 1922. For obscure reasons he left the university and went to work for the Société d'études et d'informations économiques (Society for Economic Studies and Information) chaired by Jacques Bardoux. (Note: The Bulletin de la société d'études et d'information was published by the Comité des forges, the iron and steel manufacturers' association.) This had been created in 1922 to study economic evolution after the First World War. He was first editor-in-chief of the studies section, then in 1924 took over as managing director in place of André François-Poncet. It was here that he became familiar with economics. Mireaux was economics editor for Le Temps from 1928 to 1931. He was a member of the Redressement Français movement led by Ernest Mercier, and asserted that he was an ardent supporter of economic liberalism.

== 1930s ==
Mireaux was a member of the Société d'économie politique in Paris. He served as its secretary-general from 1930 to 1937, then president from 1937 to 1940. He belonged to the young school that helped adapt the old orthodox doctrines to the modern economy. He was co-editor of Le Temps from 1 January 1932 to November 1942. Le Temps, which first appeared on 25 April 1861, was a major moderate and liberal newspaper. After World War I (1914–18) it moved towards the right and aligned with the major French employers. In 1924 the paper opposed the Cartel des Gauches. Émile Mireaux and Jacques Chastenet were put in charge of the paper in 1931. Their diplomatic positions evolved to match those of Great Britain.

Mireaux became a municipal councilor in Bazordan, Hautes-Pyrénées. He competed in the Hautes-Pyrénées senatorial election on 20 October 1935, and was elected on the second ballot. He joined the Democratic and Radical Union in the Senate. He sat in committees on the army, hygiene and social welfare, foreign affairs and education.

== World War II (1939–45) ==
On 18 May 1940 Mireaux was elected to the political economy, statistics and finance chair in the Académie des Sciences Morales et Politiques, which had been vacated by the death of Clément Colson. On 10 July 1940, he voted in favour of granting the cabinet presided by Marshal Philippe Pétain authority to draw up a new constitution, thereby effectively ending the French Third Republic and establishing Vichy France. Mireaux replaced Albert Rivaud, Minister of National Education, on 12 July 1940, taking the title of Minister of Public Instruction and Fine Arts. Mireaux concentrated all decision-making in his hands by abolishing the university advisory councils and suspending university elections. This gave him freedom to appoint or dismiss academics at will. On 6 September 1940 he was replaced by Georges Ripert, who was named Secretary of State for Public Instruction and Youth.

On 23 January 1941, Mireaux was made a member of the National Council of Vichy France.

After the defeat of France the distribution of Le Temps was restricted to the zone libre. Mireaux and Chastenet decided to suspend publication on 29 November 1942 following the German invasion of the zone libre. From 1942 to 1945 Mireaux lived quietly.

== Later career ==
Mireaux was tried by the High Court during the process of political cleansing of parliamentarians who voted the constitutional bill on 10 July 1940. On 23 January 1947 he obtained a judgement dismissing the charges due to his involvement in resistance. After this he withdrew from political life. Mireaux was president of the Académie des Sciences Morales et Politiques for 1951 and president of the Institut de France for 1951. Émile Mireaux died in Paris on 27 December 1969.

== Publications ==
Émile Mireaux contributed to many French and foreign reviews, including the Revue des deux Mondes, Revue de Paris, Revue Hebdomadaire, Revue politique et parlementaire and the Encyclopédie française and Encyclopædia Britannica. Émile Mireaux was the author of:

- Émile Mireaux (1921), Les Actions de travail, Paris: Société d'études et d'informations économiques, p. 18
- Émile Mireaux (1921), Les Crédits à l'exportation, Paris: Société d'études et d'informations économiques, p. 38
- André François-Poncet; Émile Mireaux (1922), La France et les huit heures, Paris: Société d'études et d'informations économiques, p. 272
- Émile Mireaux (1922), Le Problème financier, rapport présenté au Congrès annuel du parti républicain démocratique et social, par E. Mireaux... octobre 1922, Paris: Parti républicain démocratique et social, p. 12
- Émile Mireaux (1923), La participation aux bénéfices
- Émile Mireaux (1923), Les conseils d'usine dans le grand-duché de Luxembourg
- Émile Mireaux (1925), "Les réparations en nature", Revue de Paris, Paris: Société d'études et d'informations économiques, p. 24
- Émile Mireaux (1928), Petite histoire des finances du Cartel
- Émile Mireaux (1928), L'expérience financière de M. Poincaré
- Émile Mireaux (1929), La Gestion publique et la gestion privée des entreprises, Paris: Comité national français de la Chambre de commerce internationale / Librairie du "Recueil Sirey", p. 44
- Émile Mireaux (1930), Les Miracles du crédit. 18e édition, Paris: Éditions des Portiques, p. 255
- Jacques Chastenet; Émile Mireaux; René Puaux (1936), Le dîner du 75e anniversaire du "Temps", 9 décembre 1936, p. 27
- Émile Mireaux (1943), La Chanson de Roland et l'histoire de France, Paris: Albin Michel, p. 300
- Émile Mireaux (1948), Les poèmes homériques et l'histoire grecque, vol. 1 Homère de Chios et les routes de l'étain..., Paris: A. Michel, p. 379
- Émile Mireaux (1949), Les poèmes homériques et l'histoire grecque, vol. 2 "L'Iliade", "l'Odyssée" et les rivalités coloniales..., Paris: A. Michel, p. 445
- Émile Mireaux (1949), Philosophie du libéralisme, Bibliothèque de philosophie scientifique, Paris: Flammarion; (Mayenne, impr. de Floch), p. 349
- Émile Mireaux (1951), La reine Bérénice, Paris: Albin Michel, p. 252
- Émile Mireaux (1951), Notice sur la vie et les travaux de Clément Colson, Paris: Académie des sciences morales et politiques / Firmin-Didot, p. 22
- Émile Mireaux (1951), Discours de M. Emile Mireaux,..., Paris: Académie des sciences morales et politiques / Firmin-Didot, p. 19
- Émile Mireaux (1954), L'Organisation du crédit dans les territoires d'outre-mer, Paris: Librairie du Recueil Sirey; (Toulouse, impr. de F. Boisseau), p. 152
- Émile Mireaux (1954), La vie quotidienne au temps d'Homère, Paris: Hachette, p. 267
- Émile Mireaux (1956), Problèmes actuels de la route française
- Émile Mireaux (1957), Guizot et la renaissance de l'Académie des sciences morales et politiques, Paris: Académie des sciences morales et politiques / Firmin-Didot, p. 18
- Émile Mireaux (1958), Le Moyen Âge (in Neuf siècles de littérature française)
- Émile Mireaux (1958), Une province française au temps du Grand Roi, la Brie, Paris: Hachette (impr. Brodard et Taupin), p. 352
- Émile Mireaux (1958), La Brie: une province française au temps du Grand Roi, Paris: Hachette, p. 350
- Émile Mireaux (1958), La Vie et l'oeuvre de Maurice Muret, ..., Paris: Académie des sciences morales et politiques / Firmin-Didot, p. 16
- Émile Mireaux (1959), Tocqueville et la démocratie, Paris: Académie des sciences morales et politiques / Typographie de Firmin-Didot et Cie, p. 16
- Émile Mireaux (1960), L'Académie des sciences morales et politiques en 1848, Paris: Firmin-Didot et Cie / Académie des sciences morales et politiques, p. 18
- Émile Mireaux (1961), Louis-René Villermé, 1782–1863, Paris: Académie des sciences morales et politiques / Firmin-Didot, p. 16
- Émile Mireaux (1962), Gregorio Marañon et l'histoire, Paris: Académie des sciences morales et politiques / Firmin-Didot et Cie, p. 20
- Émile Mireaux (1963), Le Coup d'état académique du 14 avril 1855, Paris: Académie des sciences morales et politiques (impr. Firmin-Didot et Cie), p. 16
- Émile Mireaux (1964), Un Témoin critique de la monarchie bourgeoise et de la Révolution de 1848, Louis Reybaud, Paris: Académie des sciences morales et politiques / Firmin-Didot, p. 18
- Émile Mireaux (1965), Actualité de Malthus, Paris: Firmin-Didot et Cie / Académie des sciences morales et politiques, p. 16
- Émile Mireaux (1966), Réflexions sur le rôle et l'originalité des sciences morales, Paris: Académie des sciences morales et politiques / Firmin-Didot, p. 16
- Émile Mireaux (1967), Adolphe Chéruel, l'histoire philosophique, grandeur, décadence et résurrection éventuelle, Paris: Firmin-Didot et Cie / Académie des sciences morales et politiques, p. 10

Mireaux wrote prefaces to:

- Nicolas-Edme Rétif de La Bretonne (1734–1806) (1963), La vie de mon père (1788), Collection du Flambeau, Preface by Émile Mireaux, Paris: Paris : Hachette (impr. Crété), p. 239
- Le Rhum et le sucre dans les territoires français d'outre-mer, Preface by Henri Sicé, Introduction by Émile Mireaux, Paris: S.E.D.E.I.S. (impr. de J. Chaffiotte), 1949, p. 103

== Sources ==
- Albert, Pierre, Fondation du quotidien Le Temps (in French), Archives de France
- Bousquet, Pierre (1983), Histoire de l'administration de l'enseignement en France, 1789–1981, Librairie Droz, ISBN 978-2-600-03393-0
- collectif (2005), "MIREAUX (Emile)", Dictionnaire des parlementaires français 1940–1958 (in French), vol. 5
- "Comité des forges", Encyclopédie Larousse (in French), Éditions Larousse
- "Émile Mireaux", Académiciens (in French), ASMP: Académie des Sciences Morales et Politiques
- Émile Mireaux (1885–1969), BnF: Bibliotheque nationale de France
- Gueslin, André (1994), Les facs sous Vichy: étudiants, universitaires et Universités de France pendant la Seconde Guerre mondiale : actes du colloque des Universités de Clermont-Ferrand et de Strasbourg – Novembre 1993 (in French), Presses Univ Blaise Pascal, ISBN 978-2-87741-068-7
- Jolly, Jean (1960–77), "MIREAUX Emile", Dictionnaire des parlementaires français 1889–1940 (in French)
