= Yvon Delbos =

French politician (1885–1956)

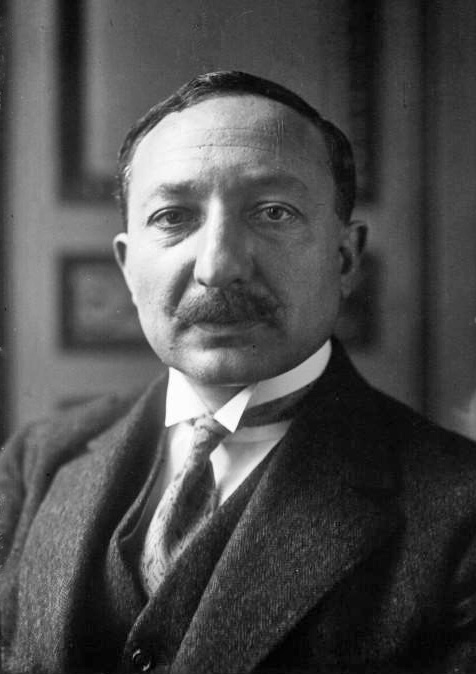
Yvon Delbos-1925

Yvon Delbos (7 May 1885 – 15 November 1956) was a French Radical-Socialist Party politician and minister.

== Biography ==
Delbos was born in Thonac, Dordogne, and entered a career as a journalist, and became a member of the Radical-Socialist Party. He subsequently served as Minister of Education (1925), Minister of Justice (1936), and notably as Minister of Foreign Affairs in the Popular Front governments of Léon Blum and Camille Chautemps.

In January 1937, unveiling a war memorial at Châteauroux, Delbos, in reply to Hitler's Reichstag speech of the previous day, emphasised the need for Franco-German understanding and for both countries to find new markets so that industrial expansion might replace rearmament. After representing France at the Nine Power Treaty Conference at Brussels on 3 November, he expounded French Foreign Policy in a debate in the Chamber on 18–19 November, emphasizing Anglo-French friendship and the necessity for its maintenance. Ten days later, he visited London with Chautemps to receive a report from Neville Chamberlain and Anthony Eden on the result of the Halifax-Hitler talks. Afterwards, he set out on a tour of the central and eastern European capitols, visiting Warsaw on 3 December, Bucharest on 8 December, Belgrade on 12 December and Prague on 15 December, in each case discussing the European situation with the ministers of the countries in question, and seeking to foster friendly relations with France.

On 10 December 1937 it was announced that a plot to assassinate him at Prague had been discovered by the French Police and the prospective assailant was arrested. He was reappointed Foreign Minister in the reconstructed Chautemps government in the third week of January 1938 but was excluded from Léon Blum's cabinet in March 1938.

During the Spanish Civil War, he worked alongside his British counterpart Anthony Eden in fleshing out the policy of nonintervention.

Political offices
Preceded by Anatole de Monzie	Minister of Public Instruction and Fine Arts; 1925	Succeeded by Édouard Daladier
Preceded by Pierre Étienne Flandin	Minister of Foreign Affairs; 1936–1938	Succeeded by Joseph Paul-Boncour
Preceded by Jean Zay	Minister of National Education; 1939–1940	Succeeded by Albert Sarraut
Preceded by Albert Sarraut	Minister of National Education; 1940	Succeeded by Albert Rivaud
Preceded by Guy Mollet, Augustin Laurent	Minister of State with Marcel Roclore; 1947	Succeeded by —
Preceded by François Billoux	Interim Minister of National Defense; 1947	Succeeded by Pierre-Henri Teitgen
Preceded by Édouard Depreux	Minister of National Education; 1948	Succeeded by Michel Tony-Révillon
Preceded by Michel Tony-Révillon	Minister of National Education; 1948–1950	Succeeded by André Morice
