= Colloque Walter Lippmann =

Conference of neoliberal intellectuals

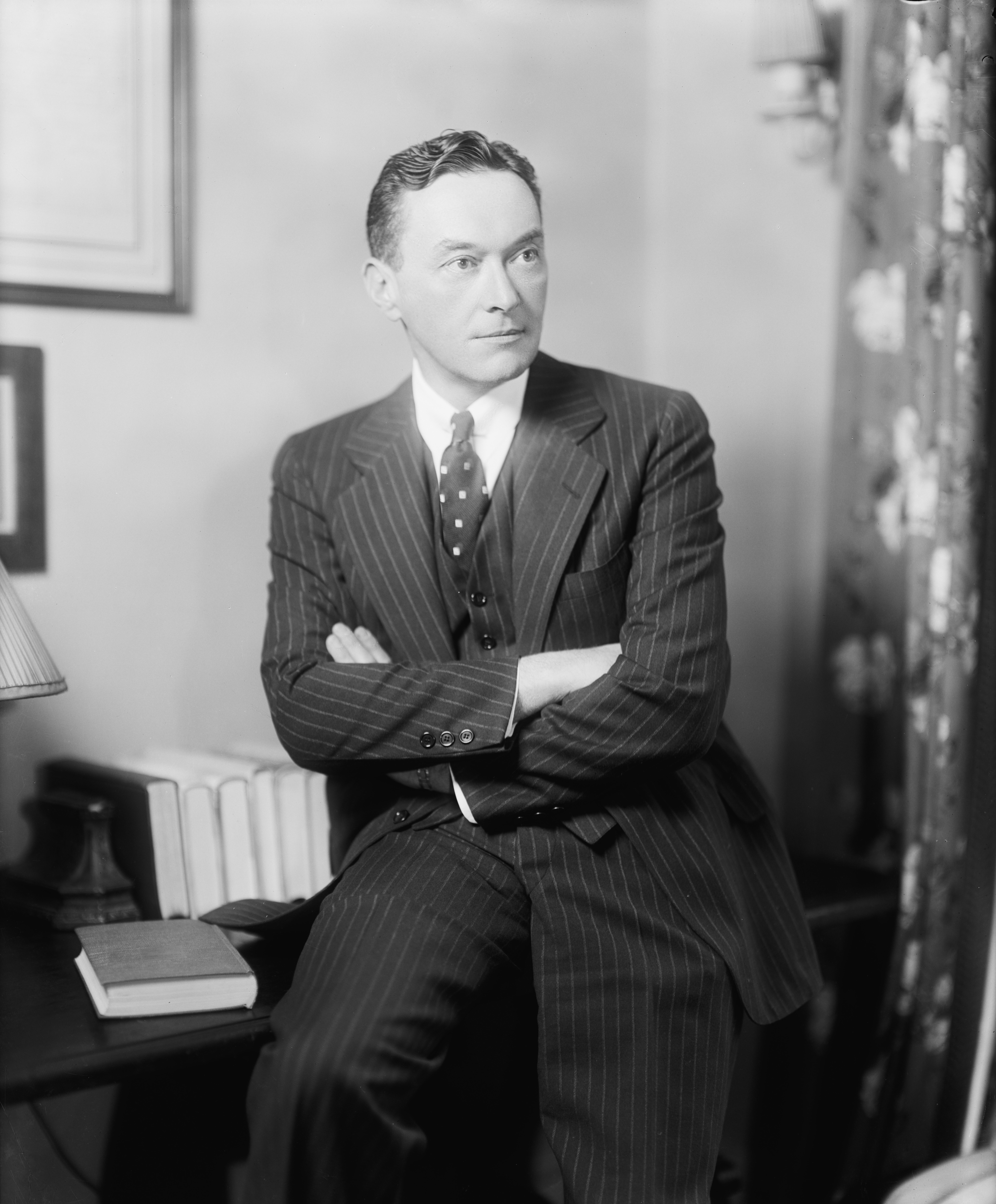
Walter Lippmann (1889–1974) after whom the colloquium was named

The Colloque Walter Lippmann (English: Walter Lippmann Colloquium), was a conference of intellectuals organized in Paris in August 1938 by French philosopher Louis Rougier. After interest in classical liberalism had declined in the 1920s and 1930s, the aim was to construct a new liberalism as a rejection of collectivism, socialism and laissez-faire liberalism. At the meeting, the term neoliberalism was coined by German sociologist and economist Alexander Rüstow, referring to the rejection of the old laissez-faire liberalism.

== Namesake ==
The colloquium was named after American journalist Walter Lippmann. Lippman's 1937 book An Enquiry into the Principles of the Good Society had been translated into French as La Cité libre (lit. 'The Free City') and was studied in detail at the meeting.

== Importance ==
Twenty-six intellectuals, including some of the most prominent liberal thinkers, took part. The participants chose to set up an organization to promote liberalism which was called the Comité international d'étude pour le renouveau du libéralisme (CIERL). Though CIERL had few consequences because of the war, it inspired Austrian-British economist and philosopher Friedrich Hayek in the postwar creation of the Mont Pelerin Society in Switzerland.

Michel Foucault's 1978–1979 Collège de France lectures, published a quarter of a century later as The Birth of Biopolitics, drew attention to the importance of the Walter Lippmann Colloquium.

== Ideological cleavages ==
The participants were divided into two primary camps; one, represented by Ludwig von Mises, Jacques Rueff, and Étienne Mantoux, which advocated a strict adherence to Manchester liberalism and laissez-faire; the other camp, represented by Alexander Rüstow, Raymond Aron, Wilhelm Röpke, Auguste Detoeuf, Robert Marjolin, Friedrich Hayek, Louis Marlio, and Walter Lippmann, opted for a kind of social liberalism which was more favorable to legislative advancement of capital markets.

== Participants ==
Participants of the Colloquium included:

- Raymond Aron, French philosopher, sociologist, journalist and political scientist
- Roger Auboin, French economist and public servant
- Friedrich Hayek, Austrian and British economist and philosopher
- Walter Lippmann, American writer, reporter and political commentator
- Auguste Detœuf, French economist
- Étienne Mantoux, French economist
- Robert Marjolin, French economist and politician
- Louis Marlio, French economist
- Ernest Mercier, French industrialist
- Ludwig von Mises, Austro-Hungarian born economist
- Michael Polanyi, Hungarian-British polymath
- Stefan Thomas Possony, Austro-Hungarian born economist and military strategist
- Wilhelm Röpke, German economist
- Louis Rougier, French philosopher
- Jacques Rueff, French economist
- Alexander Rüstow, German sociologist and economist

Walter Eucken was invited to the colloquium, but he was not given permission to leave Germany by the Nazi regime.
