= Jean Mercier =

Jean Mercier may refer to:

- Jean Mercier (engineer) (1901–1971), French engineer
- Jean Le Mercier (died 1397), French politician, advisor to kings Charles V and Charles VI
- Jean Mercier (Hebraist) (died 1570), French Hebraist
- Jean Ernest Mercier (1840–1907), French translator, historian and politician

== See also ==
- Jean Mercer (fl. 1950s–2010s), American developmental psychologist and professor
