= Ernest Mercier =

French industrialist (1878 – 1955)

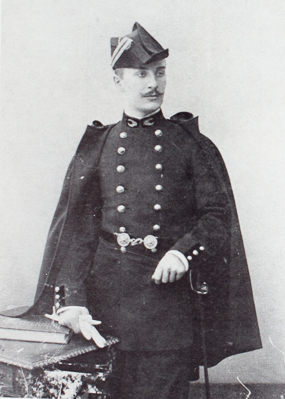
- Mercier in 1897
- Born: 4 February 1878; Constantine, Algeria
- Died: 11 July 1955 (aged 77); Paris, France
- Education: École Polytechnique
- Occupation: Industrialist

Ernest Mercier (1878 – 1955) was a French industrialist, director of the French Petroleum Company (CFP), the forerunner of the French petroleum conglomerate Total. His father, Jean Ernest Mercier, was a historian and the mayor of Constantine, Algeria (then a French colony), where Ernest was born.

== Early life and the First World War ==
Mercier's grandfather Stanislas Mercier, a Protestant republican from Doubs, left metropolitan France and established himself in Algeria, then a French colony. His father, Jean Ernest Mercier, had served as military-interpreter of Arabic to the colonial army and was a prolific author. Ernest Mercier Jr., was the third son of five children. After studying at the École Polytechnique, he chose a career in the French Navy. He was posted to the port in Toulon, where he was responsible for modernizing the site, notably the electrical network. He completed his education at the École Supérieure d’Electricité between 1905 and 1908, during which time he married Madeleine Tassin (1881-1924), the daughter of a republican Senator. He was later noticed by Albert Petsche, and left the public sector for private electrical enterprise.

During the First World War, conscripted into the navy, he fought in the Balkans and the Dardanelles. According to Kuisel (1967, p. 5), he had a "fighting spirit". Injured while in command of Romanian troops on the Danube, he returned to Paris, where he served as the liaison of Louis Loucheur (Minister of Munitions for Georges Clemenceau) to Generals Ferdinand Foch and Philippe Pétain, as well as to the American troops.

After the war, he remained as Colonel Mercier for the Anglo-American forces. When Louis Loucheur was named Minister for the Liberated Zones, Mercier accompanied him and dealt with the German factories that were dependent on the Military Control Board.

== Career in the electrical and petroleum industries ==
Ernest Mercier was most active in two sectors, electricity and petroleum which were at the time among the newest, and would soon boost the French economy of the 1920s. In 1919, he played a key role in founding the Electrical Union which encompassed various small companies around Paris. In the inter-war period, he was an important player in the electrical power industry of France, via the Messine Group, constructing thermal and hydroelectric power plants.

In 1923, he was appointed by Raymond Poincaré—on the suggestion of Louis Pineau, his advisor for the petroleum business, and by Louis Loucheur, then Minister for Industrial Reconstruction—to rebuild and restructure the petroleum sector by creating a sufficiently large company to be the premiere supplier for the nation. In effect, war and development of mechanical transport had shown both the strategic importance of this sector and France's weakness in the area. The French Petroleum Company (CFP) was founded in March 1924. A 1931 law gave 35% of its capital to the state (it was until then entirely private), although Mercier successfully averted a total takeover by the government. From its first holding, a 25% stake in the Turkish Petroleum Company, the CFP grew thanks to oil extraction near Kirkuk, Iraq, then in Colombia and in Venezuela. CFP also had interests in Romania (Steaua Roumania). Mercier extended the vertical integration of the company by constructing petroleum transport infrastructure and refineries at Gonfreville, near Le Havre and on the Étang de Berre, near Martigues.

From 1933 to 1940, he was the President of Alsthom.

== Activism and political engagement ==
Mercier was one of many wealthy industrialists, during the latter part of the French Third Republic (1870-1940), who viewed the parliamentary model of democratic government as a hindrance to the growth of industry, and began to turn his thinking "to the Fascist "experiment" in Italy and to the growing success of the Nazi Party in Germany" (Shirer, William L., The Collapse of the Third Republic, 1969, p. 157). In December 1925, Mercier founded the Redressement Français (literally the "French Resurgence"), a movement under the patronage of Marshal Ferdinand Foch with the goal of "gathering the elite and raising up the masses" (Kuisel 1967, p. 49). This movement had two main objectives: the adoption by France of a "Henry Ford" economic model (high productivity, high salaries, and mass consumption) and the modernization of political life and institutions. Despite his ambitious economic and political ideas, he failed to convince other business leaders (too Malthusian) or politicians to join him. His technocratic, elitist vision—a product of his education at the Polytechnique and influenced by Marshal Lyautey—had some aspects that could then and still can elicit hesitation even though it has now become dominant. The lack of success of his business, his involvement in the events of February 6, 1934, which he described as the victory of the "fighting spirit", and the fall of the national union government of Gaston Doumergue (November 1934) all certainly drove Mercier to dissolve the Redressement Français in 1935. He then ceased to be the spokesman of the Polytechnique modernisers, and that role was passed on to Louis Marlio and to Auguste Detœuf, author of the magazine Nouveaux Cahiers.

Mercier continued to be active in the domain of foreign policy. Upon the death of Louis Loucheur, in 1931, he took the reins of the French Pan-European Committee. In 1932, a committee of experts fathered under the auspices of the RF urged an alliance with England to put pressure on Germany. In 1934, he urged closer ties with the USRR in order to isolate Germany. It was through this prism, it seems, that he spoke at a lecture on Russia in 1936 at the Ecole Polytechnique's Center of Economic Studies, in which he pursued the work of the Groupe X-Crise. Although he still participated the 1938 Colloque Walter Lippmann (a gathering of liberal economists), he did not seem to take any active role, and perhaps had been attracted there because the problems of liberal economics were studied from a wider perspective than just that of France.

== The Second World War and beyond ==
In May 1940, the American ambassador to Paris asked Mercier to organise the distribution of aid sent by the American Red Cross. Although the Vichy regime include many former members of the RF, such as Raphaël Alibert (justice minister) or Hubert Lagardelle, Ernest Mercier did not collaborate. He believed that it was partly in revenge for this that Yves Bouthillier (a former RF member who had become the Vichy finance minister) had created legislation limiting the number of administrative posts that one person could occupy (Kuisel, 1967, p. 148), which forced Mercier to leave the CFP. Having remarried in 1927 (to Marguerite Dreyfus, niece of Alfred Dreyfus), Mercier was also the object of anti-Semitic attacks. He escaped deportation only because he was hospitalised for blood poisoning on the day he was to be arrested. He then took part in the same Resistance network as Auguste Perret, the architect, and André Siegfried.

In November 1944, he participated in the Rye Conference of international business, which undertook "a preliminary study of the economic bases for peace." In 1946, when the electrical companies that Mercier had directed were nationalised to form Électricité de France, his career as a business leader ended. He continued to preside over the French branch of the International Chamber of Commerce and sat on the boards of several companies, while as an engineer he pursued research on electric turbines.

== Notes and references ==
- Richard F. Kuisel (1967), Ernest Mercier: French Technocrat, University of California Press
- Henri Morsel (1997), "Louis Marlio, position idéologique et comportement," in Grinberg, I. et Hachez-Leroy, F., L’âge de l’aluminium, Paris, Armand Colin, pp. 106–124.
