= Pierre Marraud =

French politician

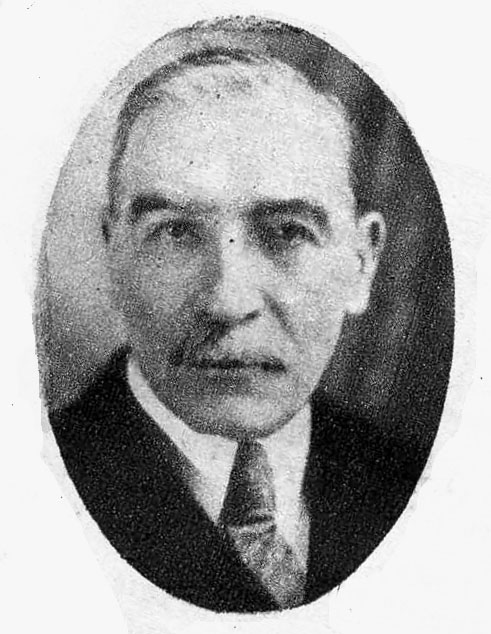
Pierre Marraud

Pierre Marraud was a French politician born in Port-Sainte-Marie, Lot-et-Garonne, 8 January 1861, died in Paris 13 March 1958.

He was a Préfet in 1900 then Councillor of State and commissaire du gouvernement at the end of the First World War. He became a prefect again of Seine-Inférieure (now Seine-Maritime) in 1918. After this he was a Senator for Lot-et-Garonne from 1920 to 1933. During his time as Senator he was also Interior Minister from 16 January 1921 to 15 January 1922 in the 7th Aristide Briand government. The other minister position he held was Minister for public instruction and fine arts from 11 November 1928 to 21 February 1930 and from 2 March 1930 to 13 December 1930 in the governments of the 5th Raymond Poincaré government, 11th Aristide Briand government, 1st André Tardieu government and the 2nd André Tardieu government. During his time in this position he introduced, on 16 April 1930, the law which introduced free secondary education.

He was also Conseiller général of Beauville and president of the conseil général of Lot-et-Garonne from 1921 to 1933.
