= Marcel Planiol =

French lawyer

- Born: 23 September 1853; Nantes, France
- Died: 31 August 1931 (aged 77); Paris, France
- Occupation: Professor of Law

Marcel Planiol (23 September 1853 – 31 August 1931) was a French professor of law at the University of Rennes, then at the Sorbonne. He wrote on the law and on historical Brittany. He is known for his Elementary Treatise of Civil Law (1901), which attempted to explain French civil law in terms of elementary principles, particularly the maxims of Roman law.

== Life ==
Marcel Planiol was born on 23 September 1853 in Nantes, Atlantique. His parents were Amand Planiol and Julie Élisabeth Laporte. He married in Rennes on 4 May 1885 to Madeleine Jeanne Claudel (1864–1947). They had a son, "Maurice" Amand Jules Planiol (1886–1963).

Planiol studied at the Faculty of Law of Paris, and wrote his thesis on Droit romain : Des bénéfices accordés aux héritiers. Droit français : Du bénéfice d'inventaire in 1879. He obtained his agrégation (teaching license) in 1880, and was accepted by the University of Grenoble as a teacher of civil law, Roman law and tax law. He was elected to the University of Rennes in 1882, then to the Sorbonne in 1887, where he succeeded Charles Beudant. Planiol was made a Professor at the Paris Faculty of Law. He taught Roman law, inheritance, labour law, patent law and criminal law.

In 1899 Planiol began work on the Traité élémentaire de droit civil (Elementary Treatise of Civil Law), which would make his reputation. His son died at the age of 20 during World War I (1914–18). After the war Planiol gave up teaching. Georges Ripert was called to Paris in 1919 as a substitute for Planiol. Ripert was given responsibility for revisions to the Traité élémentaire de droit civil. Later Planiol and Ripert co-authored the Traité pratique de droit civil (Practical Treatise on Civil Law). Ripert undertook revision of this treatise, which became a work edited by Ripert but with several other authors.

Marcel Planiol died on 31 August 1931 in Paris at the age of 77.

== Publications ==
Planiol wrote on law and also on Breton institutions. He contributed to La Grande Encyclopédie of André Berthelot and wrote on public and private law in Brittany, a work that won an award from the Académie des Sciences Morales et Politiques. The term "elementary" in the title of his major work, the Traité élémentaire de droit civil, refers to his attempt to return to the foundational elements of civil law, particularly those derived from Roman law, and to remove the additions of medieval Romanists. The work explained French civil law in moral terms of fault, obligation and responsibility. It returned to an organization by subject area rather than following the sequence of the Civil Code. It illustrated the rules by real life examples, and promoted natural law, a small number of common sense maxims, which the legislator must accept. The work was revised by Ripert, and was later rewritten by Ripert and Jean Boulanger. Publications include:

=== Law ===
- Marcel Planiol (1879), Droit romain : Des bénéfices accordés aux héritiers. Droit français : Du bénéfice d'inventaire. (doctoral thesis), Paris: impr. de E. Donnaud / Faculté de droit de Paris, p. 208
- Marcel Planiol (1880), "Une donation immobilière non transcrite est-elle opposable aux héritiers du donateur", Revue critique de législation et de jurisprudence, Paris: A. Cotillon: 15
- Marcel Planiol (1900–1901), Traité élémentaire de droit civil conforme au programme officiel, vol. 1–3, Paris: F. Pichon
  - Marcel Planiol (1901–1903), Traité élémentaire de droit civil conforme au programme officiel, vol. 1–3 (2 ed.), Paris: F. Pichon
  - Marcel Planiol (1922–1924), Traité élémentaire de droit civil conforme aux programme officiel des facultés de droit, vol. 1–3 (9 ed.), Paris: Librairie générale de droit et de jurisprudence : F. Pichon et Durand-Auzias
  - Marcel Planiol; Georges Ripert (1928–1932), Traité élémentaire de droit civil conforme au programme officiel des Facultés de droit, vol. 1–3 (10 ed.), Paris: R. Pichon et R. Durand-Auzias
  - Marcel Planiol; Georges Ripert (1932), Traité élémentaire de droit civil conforme au programme officiel des Facultés de droit (12 ed.), Paris: R. Pichon et R. Durand-Auzias
  - Jean Boulanger; Marcel Planiol; Georges Ripert (1942), Traité élémentaire de droit civil, Paris: R. Pichon et R. Durand-Auzias
- Marcel Planiol; Georges Ripert (1925–1934), Traité pratique de droit civil français, vol. 1–14, Paris: Librairie générale de droit et de jurisprudence
  - Marcel Planiol; Georges Ripert; René Savatier (1925), Traité pratique de droit civil français, vol. I Les personnes état et capacité, Paris: Librairie générale de droit et de jurisprudence R. Pichon et R. Durand-Auzias, p. 852
  - Marcel Planiol; Georges Ripert; André Rouast (1926), Traité pratique de droit civil français, vol. II La famille mariage, divorce, filiation, Paris: Librairie générale de droit et de jurisprudence R. Pichon et R. Durand-Auzias, p. 938
  - Marcel Planiol; Georges Ripert; Maurice Picard (1926), Traité pratique de droit civil français, vol. III Les biens, Paris: Librairie générale de droit et de jurisprudence, p. 991
  - Marcel Planiol; Georges Ripert; Jacques Maury; Henri Vialleton (1928), Traité pratique de droit civil français, vol. IV Successions, Paris: Librairie générale de droit et de jurisprudence, p. 852
  - Marcel Planiol; Georges Ripert; André Trasbot (1933), Traité pratique de droit civil français, vol. V Donations et testaments, Paris: Librairie générale de droit et de jurisprudence, p. 1030
  - Marcel Planiol; Georges Ripert; Paul Esmein (1930), Traité pratique de droit civil français, vol. VI. - Première partie Obligations, Paris: Librairie générale de droit et de jurisprudence, p. 1003
  - Marcel Planiol; Georges Ripert; Gabriel Gabolde; Jean Radouant (1931), Traité pratique de droit civil français, vol. VII. - Deuxième partie Obligations, Paris: Librairie générale de droit et de jurisprudence, p. 973
  - Marcel Planiol; Georges Ripert; Marcel Nast (1925), Traité pratique de droit civil français, vol. VIII. - Première partie Régimes matrimoniaux, Paris: Librairie générale de droit et de jurisprudence, p. 760
  - Marcel Planiol; Georges Ripert; Marcel Nast (1927), Traité pratique de droit civil français, vol. IX. - Deuxième partie Régimes matrimoniaux, Paris: Librairie générale de droit et de jurisprudence, p. 956
  - Marcel Planiol; Georges Ripert; Joseph Hamel; Bernard Perreau (1932), Traité pratique de droit civil français, vol. X. - Première partie Contrats civils, Paris: Librairie générale de droit et de jurisprudence, p. 991
  - Marcel Planiol; Georges Ripert; Jean Lepargneur; André Rouast; René Savatier (1932), Traité pratique de droit civil français, vol. XI. - Deuxième partie Contrats civils, Paris: Librairie générale de droit et de jurisprudence R. Pichon et R. Durand-Auzias, p. 1039
  - Marcel Planiol; Georges Ripert; Emile Becqué (1927), Traité pratique de droit civil français, vol. XII. - Première partie Sûretés réelles, Paris: Librairie générale de droit et de jurisprudence, p. 745
  - Marcel Planiol; Georges Ripert; Emile Becqué (1930), Traité pratique de droit civil français, vol. XIII. - Deuxième partie Sûretés réelles, Paris: Librairie générale de droit et de jurisprudence, p. 898
  - Marcel Planiol; Georges Ripert (1934), Traité pratique de droit civil français, vol. XIV Additions et tables générales, Paris: Librairie générale de droit et de jurisprudence, p. 986
- Marcel Planiol; Georges Ripert (1951–1963), Traité pratique de droit civil français, vol. 1–14 (2 ed.), Paris: Librairie générale de droit et de jurisprudence : R. Pichon et R. Durand-Auzias

=== Brittany ===
- Marcel Planiol (1888), "L'Assise au Cte Geffroi, étude sur les successions féodales en Bretagne", Nouvelle revue historique de droit français et étranger, Paris: L. Larose et Forcel: 102
- Marcel Planiol (1891), L'Esprit de la coutume de Bretagne, par Marcel Planiol, Vannes: impr. de Lafolye, p. 17
- Marcel Planiol (1953–1955), Histoire des institutions de la Bretagne, droit public et droit privé, vol. 1-3 (368, 317, 333 p.), preface by Edmond Durtelle de Saint-Sauveur, Rennes: Éditions du Cercle de Brocéliande
- Marcel Planiol (1981), Histoire des institutions de la Bretagne (Nouv. ed.), Mayenne: Association pour la publication du manuscrit de M. Planiol
- Marcel Planiol (1984), Histoire des institutions de la Bretagne 5 XVIe siècle souveraineté et administration générale, finances, institutions militaires, les villes, les réformations de la coutume, la justice, la noblesse et les fiefs, les campagnes, droit privé (Nouv. ed.), Mayenne: Association pour la publication du manuscrit de M. Planiol, p. 382
- Marcel Planiol (1981), L'Armorique romaine : l'époque bretonne primitive (new ed.), Mayenne: Association pour la publication du manuscrit de M. Planiol, p. 268
- Marcel Planiol (1981), La Bretagne au IXe siècle : la féodalité bretonne (Nouvelle ed.), Mayenne: Association pour la publication du manuscrit de M. Planiol, p. 345
- Marcel Planiol (1981), La Bretagne ducale: le gouvernement, l'Église, finances, justice (Nouvelle ed.), Mayenne: Association pour la publication du manuscrit de M. Planiol, p. 514
- Marcel Planiol (1982), La Bretagne ducale : institutions militaires, les villes, industrie et commerce, les campagnes, la famille, les contrats, assistance, enseignement, goût et mœurs (Nouv. ed.), Mayenne: Association pour la publication du manuscrit de M. Planiol, p. 426

=== Translations ===
- Marcel Planiol. Treatise on the civil law. 3 vols. Trans. by Louisiana State Law Institute. St. Paul, Minn.: West Pub. Co., 1959.

== Sources ==
- Blanc, Jean-Daniel, "Marcel Ferdinand PLANIOL", geneanet (in French)
- Mainguy, Daniel, Bio de juristes : Planiol (in French)
- Mainguy, Daniel, Bio de juristes : Ripert (in French)
- Marcel Planiol (1853-1931) (in French), BnF: Bibliotheque nationale de France
- Planiol, Marcel (1879), Droit romain : Des bénéfices accordés aux héritiers. Droit français : Du bénéfice d'inventaire. (doctoral thesis) (in French), Paris: impr. de E. Donnaud / Faculté de droit de Paris, p. 208
- Solus, Henry (1958), "Le Doyen Georges Ripert", Revue internationale de droit comparé (in French), 10 (4)
