= Jean Zay =

French politician and anti-Nazi resistant (1904–1944)

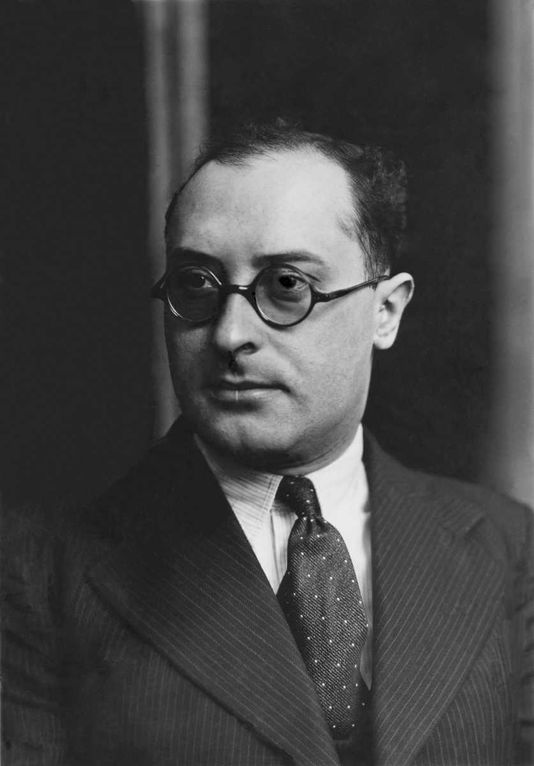

Minister of National Education
- In office 4 June 1936 – 10 September 1939
- Prime Minister: Léon Blum; Camille Chautemps; Édouard Daladier
- Preceded by: Henri Guernut
- Succeeded by: Yvon Delbos

Personal details
- Born: Jean Élie Paul Zay; 6 August 1904 Orléans, France
- Died: 20 June 1944 (aged 39) Molles, German occupied France
- Cause of death: Murder
- Resting place: Panthéon, Paris
- Party: Radical Party
- Education: Lycée Pothier

Jean Élie Paul Zay (6 August 1904 – 20 June 1944) was a French politician. He served as Minister of National Education and Fine Arts from 1936 until 1939. He was imprisoned by the Vichy government from August 1940 until he was murdered in 1944.

== Early life ==
Zay was born in Orléans, in the department of Loiret, about 130 kilometres (81 mi) south of Paris. His father, Leon Zay, descended from a Jewish family from Metz, but was born and died in Orléans, where he was the director of a radical socialist regional newspaper, Le Progrès du Loiret. His mother Alice Chartrain was a Protestant and a teacher. He grew up with his sister in the Protestant religion.

Zay was educated at the Lycée Pothier in Orléans, and became a lawyer in 1928. He was politically active from his early days, joining the Radical Party aged 21.

With his wife, Madeleine Dreux, he had two daughters, Catherine Martin-Zay, and Hélène Mouchard-Zay (born 1940).

== Political career ==
In May 1932, he was elected to the French parliament as député to represent Loiret, for the Radical Socialist Party. He defeated the incumbent representative of the Popular Democratic Party, Maurice Berger. He became one of the Jeunes Turcs (Young Turks) who wanted to renew the Radical Party, and was instrumental in the party joining the Popular Front in 1935. After the 1936 election, he was the Minister of National Education and Fine Arts from June 1936. While serving in his position, he extended the school leaving age and introduced a common curriculum in elementary schools.

In 1938, Jean Zay proposed the creation of an international film event in France, which was planned to debut in Cannes in 1939. Due to the outbreak of the Second World War, the inauguration of the Cannes Film Festival was postponed until 1946.

He was a freemason.

== Second World War ==
He resigned as minister in 1939 to join the French Army on the outbreak of the Second World War, serving as a second lieutenant attached to the headquarters of the Fourth Army. He remained a député until 1942, and he was given leave to attend the last session of the French Parliament, held in Bordeaux in June 1940. After the invasion of France by Nazi Germany in 1940, he was one of the passengers aboard the vessel Le Massilia that left from Bordeaux bound for Casablanca on 21 June 1940, with the intention of forming a resistance government in North Africa. He was arrested in August 1940, for desertion, and returned to France where he was held at the military prison in Clermont-Ferrand.

A press campaign, organised by Philippe Henriot, the minister of information in the Vichy government, called for his execution for being "Jewish, freemason and member of the Radical Party", and pointing to his anti-war poem of March 1924, Le Drapeau (The Flag), as evidence of his lack of patriotism. In October 1940, Zay was put on trial by the Vichy regime at the courthouse in Clermont-Ferrand for desertion after he boarded the liner SS Massilia for Casablanca in Morocco to continue the fight against the Nazis. He was sentenced to deportation. Held in Marseille, his sentence was commuted to one of internment in France, and he was held in the prison in Riom, sharing a cell with Rabbi Edward Gourévitch. He was allowed to communicate with friends and family, and did not attempt to escape. He was removed from the prison by three miliciens on 20 June 1944, Henri Millou, Charles Develle and Pierre Cordier, purportedly so he could be transferred to Melun. They murdered him in a wood near an abandoned quarry, at a place called Les Malavaux in the faille du Puits du diable, at Molles in Allier.

== Post-war rehabilitation ==
Zay's conviction was posthumously annulled by the appeal court in Riom in July 1945. His body was found with those of two others in 1946, under a pile of stones. The three were initially reburied together in Cusset, but Zay's body was exhumed in 1947 and identified through his dental records. The surviving milicien Charles Develle was convicted of Zay's murder in February 1953, and sentenced to forced labour for life, but released in 1955. Zay was buried in Orléans in 1948. A memorial was erected near the site of his death in Molles, and a plaque at his high school in Orléans. The rue Jean Zay in Trélazé is named after him.

A French literary prize, the Prix Jean-Zay, was created and named in his honour in 2005.

In March 2014, French President François Hollande announced his intention to recognize Jean Zay at the Panthéon in Paris as a leading figure in the Resistance, along with Pierre Brossolette, Germaine Tillion, and Geneviève de Gaulle-Anthonioz. The official ceremony was held on 27 May 2015, National Day of Resistance, moving Zay's remains from the Main Cemetery of Orléans.

In 2019 a new supercomputer acquired by the CNRS was named for Jean Zay.

Preceded by Henri Guernut	Minister of National Education; 1936–1939	Succeeded by Yvon Delbos
