= Le Temps (Paris) =

Paris daily newspaper 1861-1942

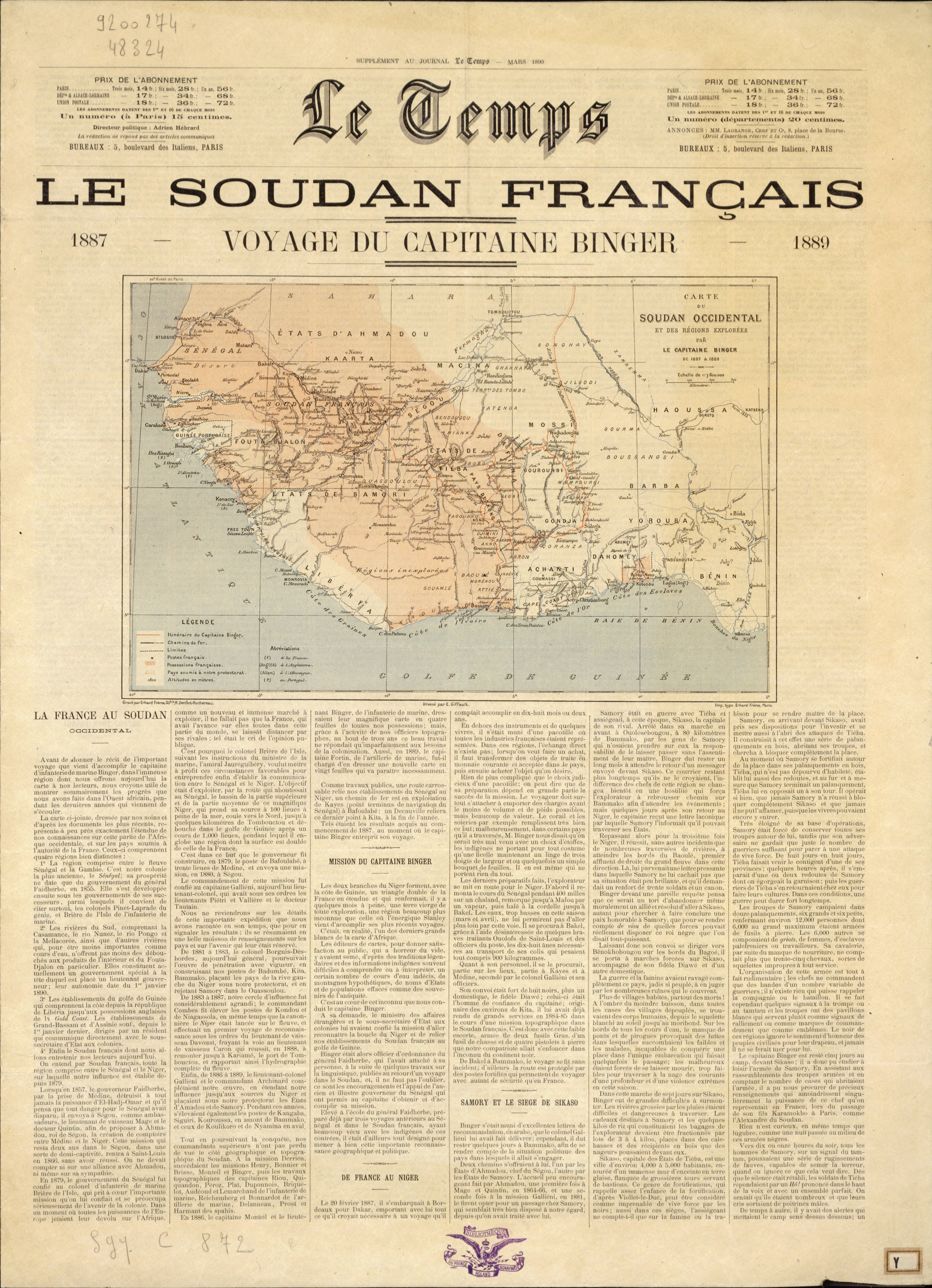
Front page of Le Temps from March 1890

Le Temps (French pronunciation: [lə tɑ̃], The Times) was one of Paris's most important daily newspapers from 25 April 1861 to 30 November 1942. It was a serious paper of record.

Founded in 1861 by Edmund Chojecki (writing under the pen name "Charles Edmond") and Auguste Nefftzer, Le Temps was under Nefftzer's direction for ten years, when Adrien Hébrard took his place, and for nearly 45 years directed the newspaper with an iron hand until his death in 1914. He was succeeded by his sons Émile (1914), and Adrien Jr. (1925) and by Louis Mills (1929). Soon after Mills's death in 1931, Le Temps became a public limited company. Adrien Hébrard and his successors left substantial freedom to the editorial room and the newspaper had the reputation of keeping its journalists for a long time. Le Temps always remained moderate politically.

The early issues of the newspaper reflected Nefftzer's liberal philosophy and had considerable trouble achieving readership. He frequently had to turn to friends in Alsace who were able to help support Le Temps financially. Eventually, circulation began to grow, from scarcely 3,000 in 1861, to 11,000 in 1869, 22,000 in 1880, 30,000 in 1884, 35,000 in 1904. During the interwar period, it varied between 50,000 and 80,000. Publication of the Paris edition of Le Temps was suspended by the Paris Commune, and so there were no issues from 7 May to 19 May 1871. The St. Germain edition, however, ran continuously for 81 years.

Despite its comparatively modest circulation, Le Temps soon became the most important newspaper of the French Republic, particularly among the French political and economic elite. The political and diplomatic information and commentaries of the paper, "serious to the point of boredom", also carried considerable clout elsewhere in Europe. Journalists and correspondents included Georges Bruni, and Adolphe Cohn in the United States.

On 28 November 1942, following the German invasion of the Zone libre, Jacques Chastenet and Émile Mireaux, the co-directors of Le Temps at the time, jettisoned the newspaper. At Charles de Gaulle's request, Le Monde was founded on 19 December 1944 to replace Le Temps as the newspaper of record, with the new newspaper borrowing the layout and typeface of Le Temps.

== See also ==
- History of French journalism
