= Jacques Chastenet =

French journalist, historian and diplomat

- Born: Jacques Chastenet de Castaing; 20 April 1893; Paris, France
- Died: 7 February 1978 (aged 84); Paris, France
- Occupations: journalist, historian and diplomat
- Years active: 1918–1974
- Known for: Le Temps newspaper (1931–1942)
- Awards: Académie française (1956)

Jacques Chastenet de Castaing (French: [ʃastnɛ]; 20 April 1893, in Paris – 7 February 1978, in Paris) was a French journalist, historian and diplomat.

Le Temps, which first appeared on 25 April 1861, was a major moderate and liberal newspaper. After World War I (1914–18) it moved towards the right and the confederations of major French employers. In 1924 the paper opposed the Cartel des Gauches. Émile Mireaux and Jacques Chastenet were put in charge of the paper in 1931. Their diplomatic positions eventually became those of Great Britain. After the defeat of France in World War II (1939–45) the newspaper's distribution was restricted to the zone libre. It ceased publication on 29 November 1942 following the German invasion of the zone libre.

Chastenet was elected to the Académie française on 29 November 1956.

== Bibliography ==
- 1918 Du Sénat constitué en Cour de Justice
- 1941 William Pitt (Fayard)
- 1943 Godoy, Prince de la Paix (Fayard)
- 1945 Vingt ans d’histoire diplomatique, 1919–1939 (Le Milieu du monde)
- 1945 Wellington (Fayard)
- 1946 Le Parlement d’Angleterre (Fayard)
- 1946 Les Grandes heures de Guyenne (Colbert)
- 1947 Le Siècle de Victoria (Fayard)
- 1948 Raymond Poincaré (Julliard)
- 1949 La France de M. Fallières (Fayard)
- 1952 Histoire de la IIIe République, Tome I. L’Enfance de la Troisième (1870–1879) (Hachette)
- 1953 Elisabeth Ière (Fayard)
- 1954 Histoire de la IIIe République, Tome II. La République des Républicains (1879–1893) (Hachette)
- 1955 Histoire de la IIIe République, Tome III. La République triomphante (1893–1906) (Hachette)
- 1956 Winston Churchill
- 1957 Histoire de la IIIe République, Tome IV. Jours inquiets et jours sanglants (1906–1918) (Hachette)
- 1958 Quand le bœuf montait sur le toit
- 1960 Histoire de la IIIe République, Tome V. Les Années d’illusion (1918–*1931) (Hachette)
- 1961 La vie quotidienne en Angleterre au début du Règne de Victoria, 1837–1851 (Hachette)
- 1962 Histoire de la IIIe République, Tome VI. Déclin de la Troisième (1931–1938) (Hachette)
- 1963 Histoire de la IIIe République, Tome VII. Le drame final (1938–1940) (Hachette)
- 1964 La guerre de 1914–1918 (Hachette)
- 1965 L’Angleterre d’aujourd’hui (Calmann-Lévy)
- 1966 La vie quotidienne en Espagne au temps de Goya
- 1967 Histoire de l’Espagne
- 1967 En avant vers l’Ouest. La conquête des États-Unis par les Américains
- 1968 Léon Gambetta
- 1970 De Pétain à de Gaulle (Fayard)
- 1970 Cent ans de République, 9 vol. (Tallandier)
- 1974 Quatre fois vingt ans (Plon)

== Sources ==
- Albert, Pierre, Fondation du quotidien Le Temps (in French), Archives de France
