= Adolphe Cohn =

Franco-American educator

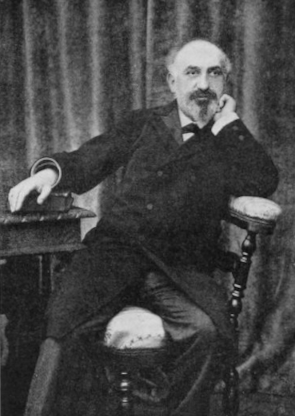
- Born: Isaac Adolphe Cohn; May 29, 1851; Paris, France
- Died: February 12, 1930 (aged 78); Paris, France
- Education: University of Paris; École des Chartes
- Occupation: Educator
- Spouse: Marian Loys Wright (m. 1887; died 1888)
- Awards: Officier of the Legion of Honor (1900)

Isaac Adolphe Cohn (May 29, 1851 – February 12, 1930) was a Franco-American educator.

== Biography ==
Isaac Adolphe Cohn was born in Paris on May 29, 1851. He was graduated "bachelier ès lettres" from the University of Paris in 1868, and studied law, historical criticism, and philology at various institutions of higher learning in Paris, receiving the degrees of LL.B. in 1873. A pupil of the École des Chartes, his thesis was called Vues sur l'histoire de l'organisation judiciaire en France du IXe au XIIIe siècle considérée au point de vue des juridictions extraordinaires and he got the diploma of "archiviste paléographe" in 1874. At the commencement of the Franco-Prussian War in 1870, he enlisted and served in the French army throughout the struggle.

Cohn emigrated to New York City on May 13, 1875, and from 1876 to 1884 was the American correspondent of La République française, then edited by Léon Gambetta, whom he had known in France, and whose political views he had adopted. In March 1882, Cohn was appointed tutor in French at Columbia College, and soon afterward made an instructor. By a popular vote of the French residents of New York he was chosen to deliver the funeral oration on Gambetta in 1883 at Tammany Hall, and in 1885 was called from Cambridge, Massachusetts, for a similar purpose, upon the death of Victor Hugo.

In 1884 Cohn was made instructor in French at Harvard University. From 1885 to 1891 he was assistant professor of French at the same institution, and during this time wrote much in French and English, especially for the Atlantic Monthly. He became American correspondent of Le Temps in 1884, and continued to act as such until 1895. While at Harvard he was temporary head of the French department in Wellesley College, and in 1888 and 1889 conducted a summer school of languages at Oswego, New York.

He married Marian Loys Wright on April 6, 1887. She died on February 19, 1888.

In 1891 Cohn was appointed Professor of the Romance Languages and Literatures at Columbia College. He was president of the New York committee of L'Alliance Française from 1888 to 1902, and was made its honorary president. In 1897 he was made a knight of the Crown of Italy, and in 1900 an Officier of the Legion of Honor. He edited many French classics for educational purposes.

He died in Paris on February 12, 1930.
