= Auguste Detœuf =

French economist, writer, and industrialist

- Born: 6 August 1883; Lens, Pas-de-Calais, France
- Died: 11 April 1947 (aged 63)
- Occupations: Economist, industrialist

Auguste Albert Prudent Detœuf (6 August 1883 – 11 April 1947) was a French economist, essayist, and industrialist.

== Biography ==
=== Early life and education ===
Auguste Detœuf was born in Lens, and studied at Polytechnique University (class of 1902), then became a general engineer for roads and bridges.

=== Career ===
Detœuf began working in 1908 at the hydraulic works of the navy in Cherbourg. He was then appointed to Le Havre in 1912. He became interested in the problems of port operations and implemented his ideas during the First World War. He was then assigned to the technical commission for navigable waterways.

From director of the port of Strasbourg, he became general manager of Thomson-Houston. From 1928 to 1940, he was the first chairman of Alstom.

Involved in the upheavals of his time, Detœuf gave a famous speech in 1936 to the X-Crise group entitled "The end of liberalism". In 1938, he took part in the Walter Lippmann colloquium where, on certain themes, he opposed Ludwig von Mises. He is also one of the founders of the magazine Nouveaux Cahiers, which campaigns for the rapprochement of employers with trade unions.

Under the Occupation, Detœuf was president of one of the "organizing committees" created by the Vichy regime, that of the electrical construction industries. He is also a member of the Economic Studies Council, which meets twice a month with the Minister of the Economy in Vichy.

Detœuf was a friend of Boris Souvarine and corresponded with Simone Weil. He died in 1947, at the age of 63.

== Honours and awards ==
- Chevalier of the Order of Legion of Honour (1919)
- Officier of the Order of Legion of Honour (1926)
