= Jacques Bordeneuve =

French politician

Jacques Bordeneuve (28 August 1908 Sainte-Livrade-sur-Lot – 31 January 1981 Neuilly-sur-Seine) was a French politician. He served as the state secretary for art and literature and as a senator.

== Biography ==
Orphaned at a very young age, Jacques Bordeneuve was raised by his uncle. He attended the Georges-Leygues Middle School in Villeneuve-sur-Lot, then studied law at the universities of Paris and Toulouse.

He was admitted to the bar at the Agen Court of Appeals in 1937.

Political offices
Preceded by René Billères	Minister of National Education; 1958	Succeeded by Jean Berthoin
