= Jacques Bardoux =

French politician

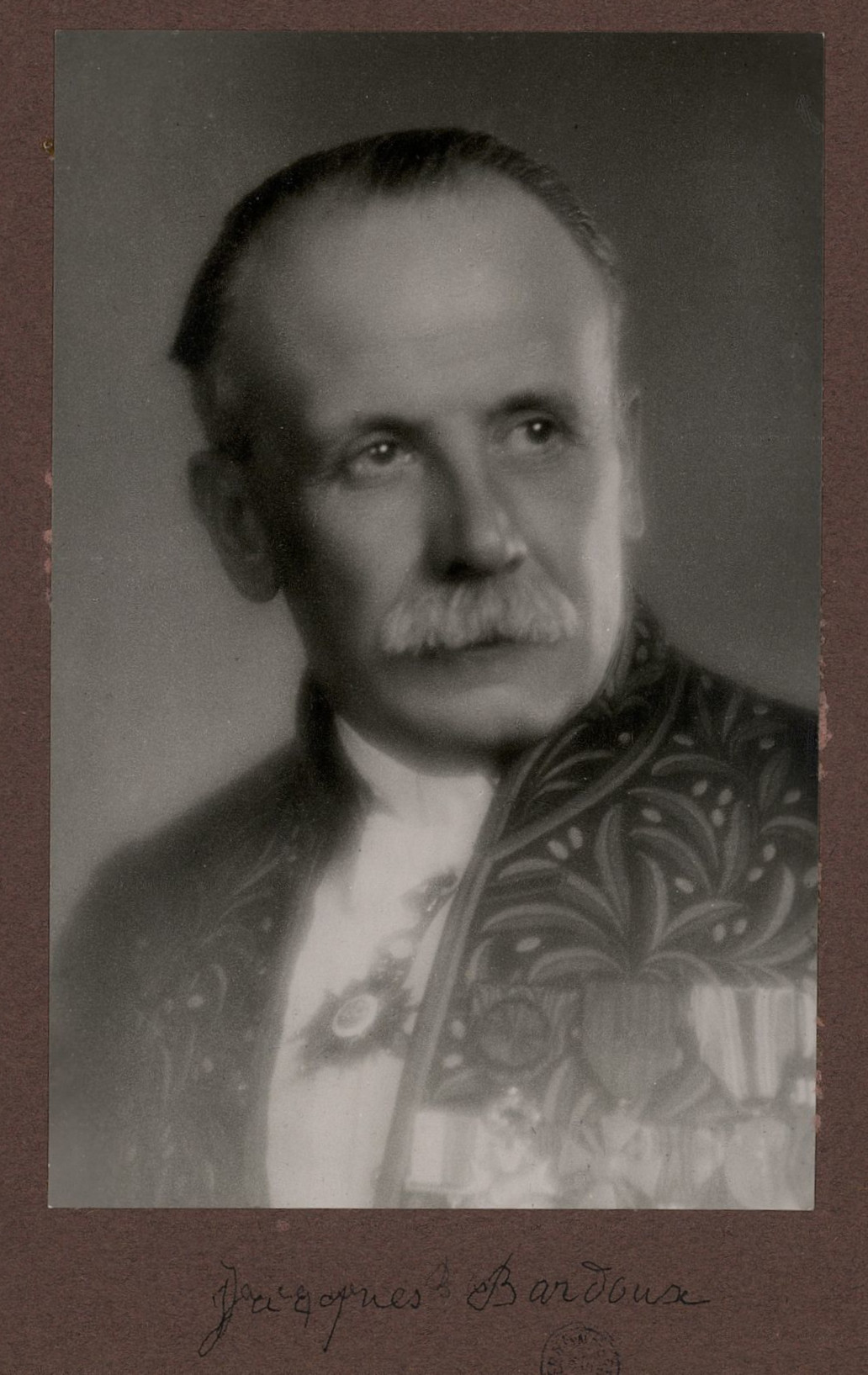
- Born: Achille Octave Marie Jacques Bardoux; 27 May 1874; Versailles, Seine-et-Oise, France
- Died: 15 August 1959 (aged 85); Saint-Saturnin, Puy-de-Dôme, France
- Education: Lycée Condorcet; Lycée Janson de Sailly
- Alma mater: University of Oxford
- Occupation: Politician
- Spouse: Henriette Marie Geneviève Picot
- Parent(s): Agénor Bardoux; Sophie Bimar
- Relatives: Valéry Giscard d'Estaing (grandson)

Achille Octave Marie Jacques Bardoux (27 May 1874 – 15 August 1959) was a French politician.

In the 1930s the Comité des forges published the Bulletin de la société d'études et d'information, edited by Émile Mireaux and then by Jacques Bardoux. Bardoux served as a member of the French Senate from 1938 to 1944, and as a member of the National Assembly from 1945 to 1955, representing Puy-de-Dôme.

On 10 July 1940, he voted in favour of granting the cabinet presided by Marshal Philippe Pétain authority to draw up a new constitution, thereby effectively ending the French Third Republic and establishing Vichy France. In 1941, he became a member of the National Council of Vichy France.
