= Arthur de Cumont =

French politician (1818–1902)

Arthur, vicomte de Cumont
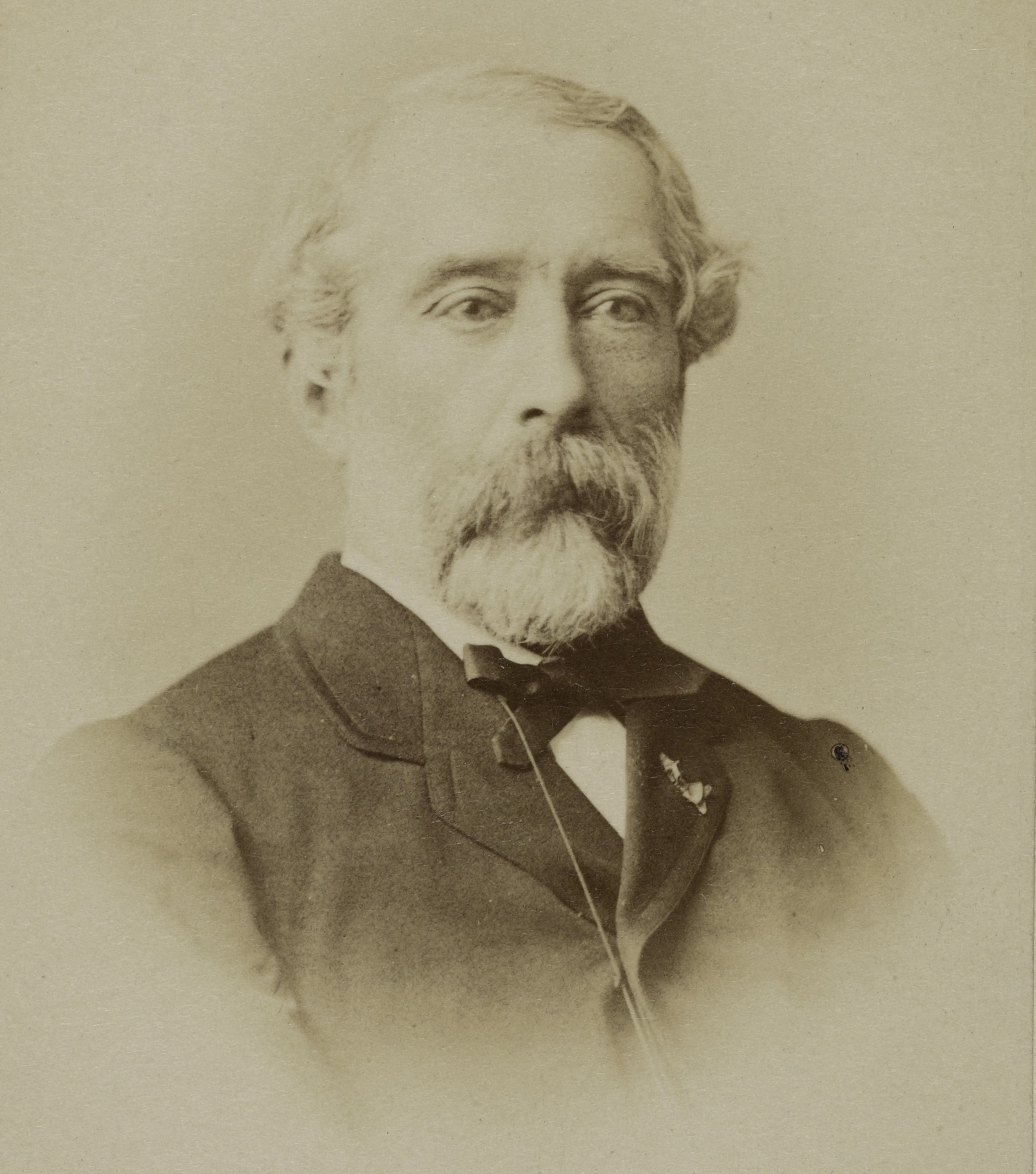

Arthur Timothée Antoine Victor, vicomte de Cumont (19 April 1818 – 10 February 1902) was a French politician. He was Minister of Public Instruction, Cults and Fine Arts from 1874 until 1875.
