= Anatole de Monzie =

French politician and scholar (1876–1947)

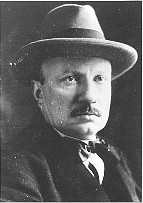
Anatole de Monzie

Anatole de Monzie (French pronunciation: [anatɔl də mɔ̃zi]; 22 November 1876, Bazas, Gironde – 11 January 1947, Paris) was a French administrator, encyclopaedist (Encyclopédie française), political figure and scholar. His father was a tax collector in Bazas, Gironde where Anatole – a name he disliked from an early age – was born in 1876. A nurse mishap resulted in an accident where the infant Anatole lost the proper use of his leg and he remained crippled for the rest of his life. He never married but had several relationships. A brilliant mind, he studied in Agen before attending the Collège Stanislas, a famous Roman Catholic school in Paris, where he became friend with writer to be Henry de Jouvenel and Roman Catholic activist Marc Sangnier.

== Career ==
He studied law and started to practice but finally chose politics. He was chef de cabinet of education minister Joseph Chautemps in 1902. At about the same time, he started a career as a local politician in the southwestern French department Lot. Successively, and often simultaneously, he became counsellor, general, mayor of Cahors (the local prefecture), deputy and senator. Soon commanding a following among the local voters, pleased by his culture, his access to government and proficiency in handing out public sector jobs, he made of the Lot a stronghold.

A member of a small centrist faction, called Républicains Socialistes, he soon became a prominent figure in the Chambre des Députés because of his abilities and his central positioning. His ministerial career started in 1913 when he was appointed sous-secrétaire d'État à la marine marchande. From 1918 to 1940, he occupied numerous positions in all sorts of governments and was appointed minister eighteen times.

As finance minister, he is remembered for recommending to cut the budget in 1925. He was deeply involved in diplomatic affairs, starting a campaign for a renewal of the relations with the Holy See. Followed, in 1922, by a plea for the acknowledgement of the Soviet Union. From 1924 to 1927, he headed the Russian Affairs Commission and as such dealt with some of the prominent Russian figures of that time. He started discussing the reimbursement of Russian loans but, after the return to power of Poincaré in 1926, the negotiation failed.

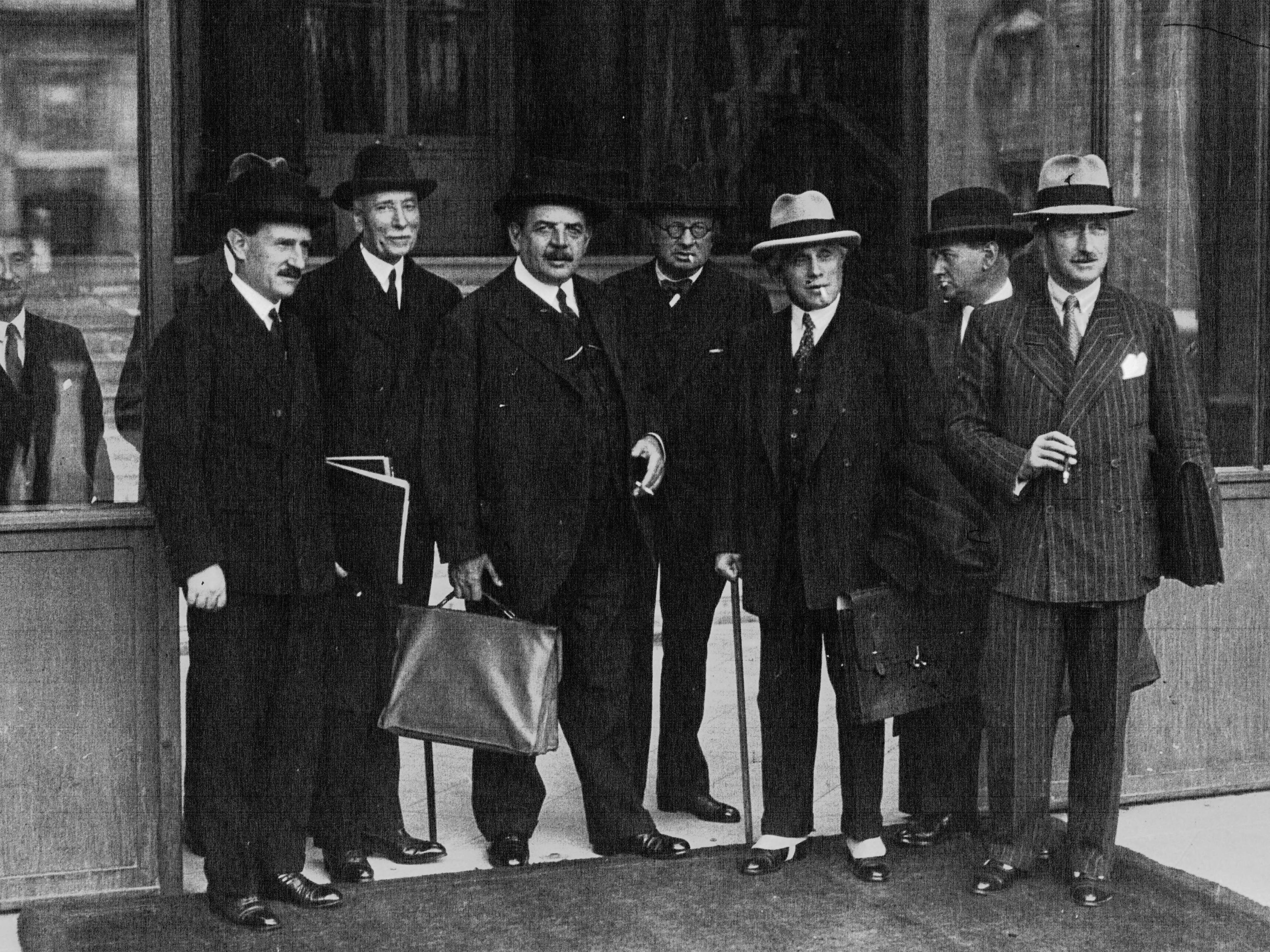
Chautemps, Renoult, Herriot, de Monzie, P. Boncour, Marchandeau and Paganon leaving the Élysée on 7 January 1933

In 1925, he also served briefly as Minister of Education and Fine Arts. He is credited for introducing philosophy in the high school curriculum, perhaps a reflection of his masonic affiliation. He also banned the teaching of local dialects or languages in school – for instance, declaring in 1927 that "for the linguistic unity of France, the Breton language must disappear". During a new stint as Minister of Education in the government of Édouard Herriot in 1932, the name of the department was changed to Éducation nationale, a name it has kept hitherto. His policy generally promoted a free and neutral education system.

He became Minister of Public Works in 1938 and was confronted with a dockworker's strike. Between 1938 and 1940, he led several diplomatic missions. During that time of international tensions, Anatole's position was a matter of controversy. A stalwart pacifist, he promoted an alliance between France and Italy who would mediate between Hitler and the Allies.

On 10 July 1940, he voted in favour of granting the cabinet headed by Marshal Philippe Pétain authority to draw up a new constitution, thereby effectively ending the French Third Republic and establishing Vichy France. Being a friend of Otto Abetz, Darquier de Pellepoix and Fernand de Brinon, he was nonetheless an object of hatred for many among the Vichy regime. He was forced to resign from his mayorship in 1942. Indicted by the Comité national des écrivains (National Writers' Committee) in 1945, he died in Paris two years later.

Anatole de Monzie was a scholar and something of a writer. His intellectual legacy includes the publication of the Encyclopédie française. He was also connected to various French writers and intellectuals of the time, including Colette, Roland Dorgelès, Lucien Febvre and Pierre Benoit, whom he introduced to the Lot, especially the little town of Saint-Céré, where the writer wrote several of his works. Despite his achievements, however, his legacy will be forever tainted by his opposition to Breton culture.

== Works of Anatole de Monzie ==
- Les Réformes scolaires, Paris, Stock, 1905
- Aux confins de la politique, Paris, Grasset, 1913
- Si resucitara !, Paris, Alcan, 1915 (sur les relations Franco-espagnoles)
- Rome sans Canossa, ou la diplomatie de la présence, Paris, Albin Michel, 1918
- L'entrée au forum : vingt ans avant, Paris, Albin Michel, 1920
- La Mort de Julie, Paris, Auguste Blaizot, 1922
- Du Kremlin au Luxembourg, Paris, Delpuech, 1924
- Les Contes de Saint-Céré, Paris, Gallimard, 1929
- Grandeur et servitude judiciaires, Paris, Kra, 1931
- Petit manuel de la Russie nouvelle, Paris, Firmin-Didot, 1931
- Livre d'oraisons, Paris, Excelsior, 1934
- Les Veuves abusives, Paris, Grasset, 1937
- Ci-devant, Paris, Flammarion, 1941
- Pétition pour l'histoire, Paris, Flammarion, 1942
- Mémoires de la tribune, Paris, Correa, 1943
- La Saison des juges, Paris, Flammarion, 1943
- Le Conservatoire du peuple, Paris, Société d'Édition d'enseignement supérieur, 1948

Political offices
| Preceded by Théodore Steeg | Minister of Justice; 1925 | Succeeded by Camille Chautemps |
