= André Boulloche =

French politician (1915–1978)

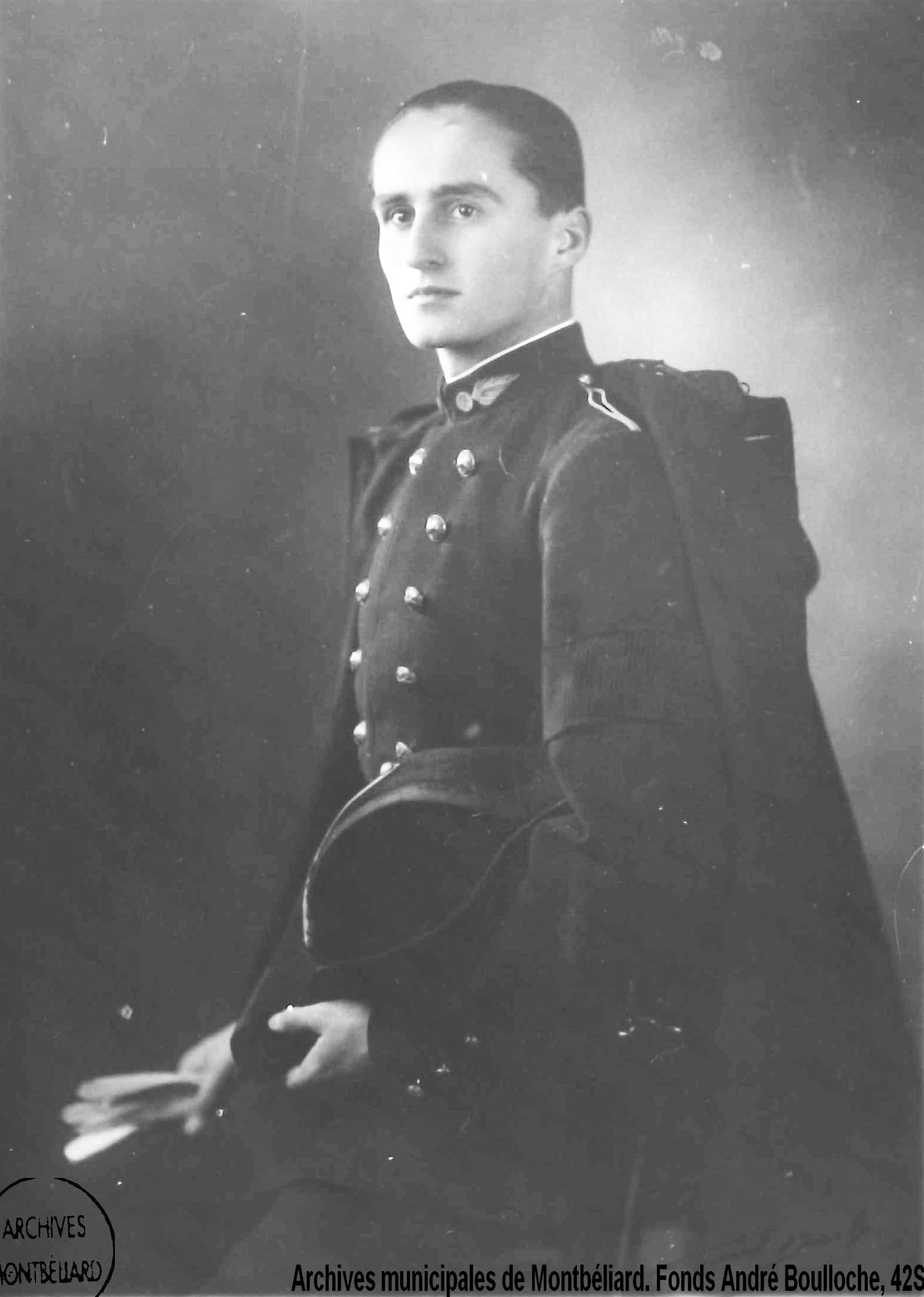
- Bulloche around 1936 wearing the uniform of L'École polytechnique

Deputy of Doubs's 2nd constituency
- In office 3 April 1967 – 16 March 1978
- Preceded by: Georges Becker
- Succeeded by: Marcel Domon

Mayor of Montbéliard
- In office 1965–1978
- Preceded by: Jean-Pierre Tuefferd
- Succeeded by: André Lang

Minister of National Education
- In office 8 January 1959 – 23 December 1959
- Preceded by: Jean Berthoin
- Succeeded by: Louis Joxe

Personal details
- Born: André François Roger Jacques Boulloche; 7 September 1915 Paris, France
- Died: 16 March 1978 (aged 62) Malsburg-Marzell, Germany
- Party: SFIO; PS
- Education: École Polytechnique

André Boulloche (7 September 1915 – 16 March 1978) was a French politician who belonged to the Socialist Party.

== Biography ==
In June, 1940, shortly after the German occupation of France, Boulloch joined the French Resistance. In August, 1944, he was arrested by the Gestapo. Ten days before the Liberation of Paris he was transported to Buchenwald concentration camp. He survived his captivity, however, including a stay at Auschwitz.

He died on March 16, 1978 when the plane he was travelling on crashed into the side of Blauen mountain, after failing to land at the Basel Mulhouse Airport.
