= Encyclopédie française =

The Encyclopédie française was a French encyclopedia designed by Anatole de Monzie and Lucien Febvre. It appeared between 1935 and 1966.

== Volumes ==
- I. L'Outillage mental. Pensée, langage, mathématique.
- II. La physique.
- III. Le Ciel et la Terre.
- IV. La vie.
- V. Les êtres vivants.
- VI. L'être humain.
- VII. Espèce humaine.
- VIII. La vie mentale.
- IX. L'univers économique et social.
- X. L'état moderne, aménagement et crise.
- XI. La vie internationale.
- XII. Chimie. Science et industries.
- XIII. Industrie. Agriculture.
- XIV. La civilisation quotidienne.
- XV. Education et instruction.
- XVI. Arts et Littératures dans la société contemporaine: Materiaux et Techniques.
- XVII. Arts et Littératures dans la société contemporaine: Oeuvres et Interprétations.
- XVIII. La Civilisation écrite.
- XIX. Philosophie. Religion.
- XX. Le monde en devenir (histoire, évolution, prospective).
