= Paul Mantoux =

French historian

Paul Joseph Mantoux
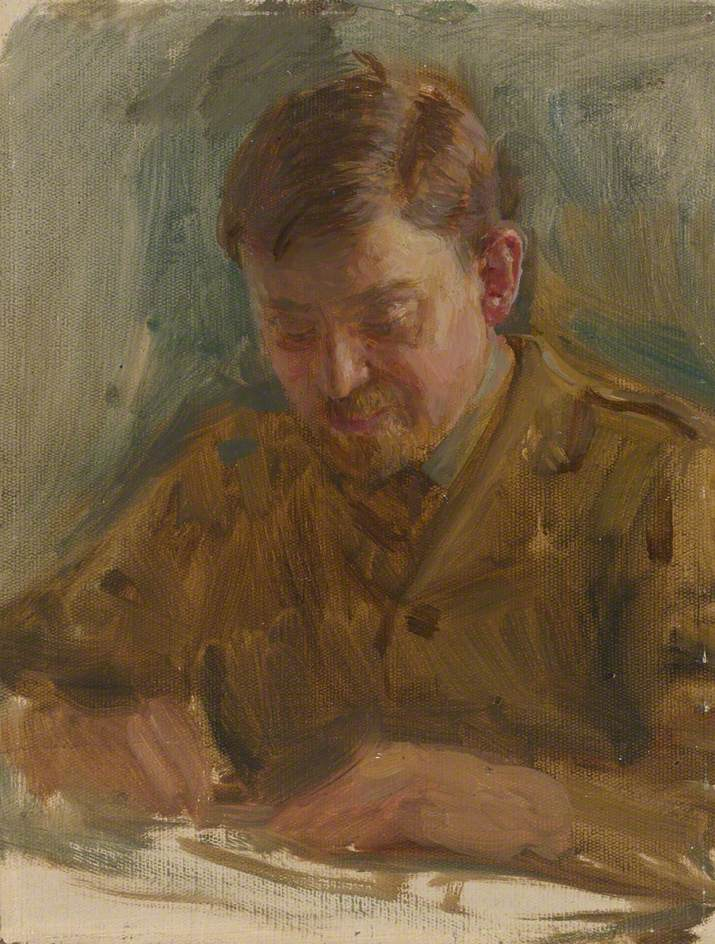
- Born: 14 April 1877; Paris, France
- Died: 14 December 1956 (aged 79); Paris, France
- Occupation: Economic historian

Paul Mantoux (14 April 1877 – 14 December 1956) was a French economic historian of the Industrial Revolution who taught at the University of London, the Conservatoire national des arts et métiers, and the Geneva Graduate Institute. His best known work is the 1906 book The Industrial Revolution in the Eighteenth Century: An Outline of the Beginnings of the Modern Factory System in England, which fellow economic historian T. S. Ashton stated was "by far the best introduction to the subject in any language."

Mantoux was the interpreter of Georges Clemenceau at the Paris Peace Conference in 1919. He was subsequently director of the Political Section of the League of Nations's secretariat. In 1927, he co-founded the Geneva Graduate Institute, along with William Rappard. Mantoux trained at the École normale supérieure (Paris). One of his children was the economist Étienne Mantoux.

== Works ==
- La Révolution industrielle au XVIIIe siècle. Essai sur les commencements de la grande industrie moderne en Angleterre. Paris: Société de librairie et d'édition, 1906, 544 pp.
  - English translation: The Industrial Revolution in the Eighteenth Century: An Outline of the Beginnings of the Modern Factory System in England tr. Marjorie Vernon. London: Jonathan Cape, 1929, 539 pp.
- A travers l'Angleterre contemporaine : la guerre Sud-Africaine et l'opinion, l'organisation du parti ouvrier, l'évolution du gouvernement et de l'État. Paris: Félix Alcan, 1909.
- The Deliberations of the Council of Four (March 24-June 28, 1919) / Notes of the Official Interpreter, Paul Mantoux; Translated and Edited by Arthur S. Link, with the Assistance of Manfred F. Boemeke. Princeton University Press, 1992.
