= Henri Guernut =

French politician

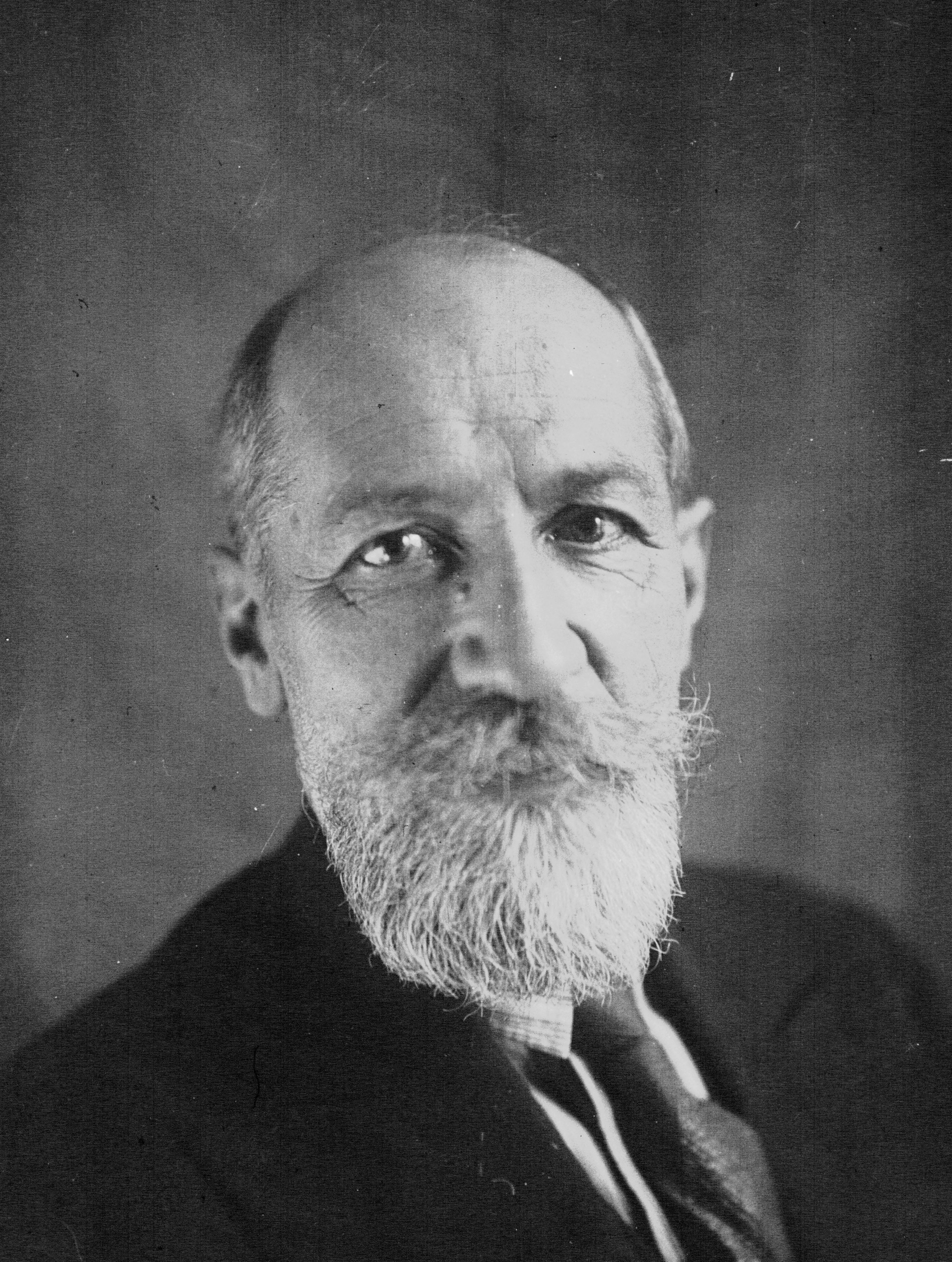
- French human rights activist

Personal details
- Born: 2 November 1876 Lavaqueresse (Aisne)
- Died: 28 May 1943 (aged 66) Paris
- Party: IDG (1928–1932); Radical Party (1932–1936)
- Occupation: Lawyer
- Profession: Human right activist politician

Henri Guernut was a French politician born on 2 November 1876 in Lavaqueresse in the Aisne and died 28 May 1943 in Paris.

== Biography ==
=== Early life ===
His parents were peasants in Thiérache. Henri got the attention of his teacher and was sent to the school of Vervins. He was then granted a scholarship to continue at the high school of Laon and then of Lille. He was then accepted at the prestigious Lycée Louis-le-Grand. He finally went to Sorbonne and obtained a degree in law.

=== Defending human rights ===
He published some articles in The La Revue socialis and got involved in Dreyfus affair. He joined the French League for the Defense of Human and Citizen's Rights which had just been founded and was later called the Human Rights League (France). In 1912 he became secretary general of the league.

For his reformist position he did not participate in the 1914–1918 war. He remained general secretary of the League of Human Rights from 1912 to 1932.

=== Political activities ===
In 1924, he ran for legislative elections in Château-Thierry but he was beaten. In 1928, he was elected as an independent leftist. Henri was reelected in 1932 at Radical Party (France). He finally left his responsibilities of directing the League of Human Rights.

He became Minister of National Education from 24 January to 4 June 1936 in the government of Albert Sarraut (2) but the victory of the Popular Front led to his departure. He was replaced by Jean Zay. He also lost his seat as deputy of the Aisne, in favor of Paul Lambin of SFIO – French Section of the Workers' International.

=== Final battles ===
He then returned to the League of Human Rights and attacked the "Stalinist tyranny" while it not have a very clear position on the issue and did not denounce the Moscow Trials.

He continued writing his columns in his newspaper La Tribune de l'Aisne, but suspended this activity in 1940. Taking up his lawyer's dress, he tried to defend victims of the Occupation. He died in 1943 of tuberculosis.
