= René Billères =

French politician

René Billères (29 August 1910 in Ger, Hautes-Pyrénées – 2 October 2004 in Lourdes, Hautes-Pyrénées) was a French politician.

Billères served as a Radical deputy for the Hautes-Pyrénées from 1946 till 1973 and Senator for the same department from 1973 till 1983. He served as Minister of National Education from 1956 to 1958 in numerous Fourth Republic governments (Guy Mollet, Maurice Bourgès-Maunoury and Félix Gaillard). As Minister of National Education, he extended the years of compulsory schooling and played an instrumental role in increasing the ministry's budget.

As President of the Radical Party from 1965 to 1969, he played an important role in the Federation of the Democratic and Socialist Left.

Political offices
Preceded by Jean Berthoin	Minister of National Education; 1956–1958	Succeeded by Jacques Bordeneuve
Party political offices
Preceded by Maurice Faure	Radical Party; 1965–1969	Succeeded by Maurice Faure
