= Jean Berthoin =

French politician

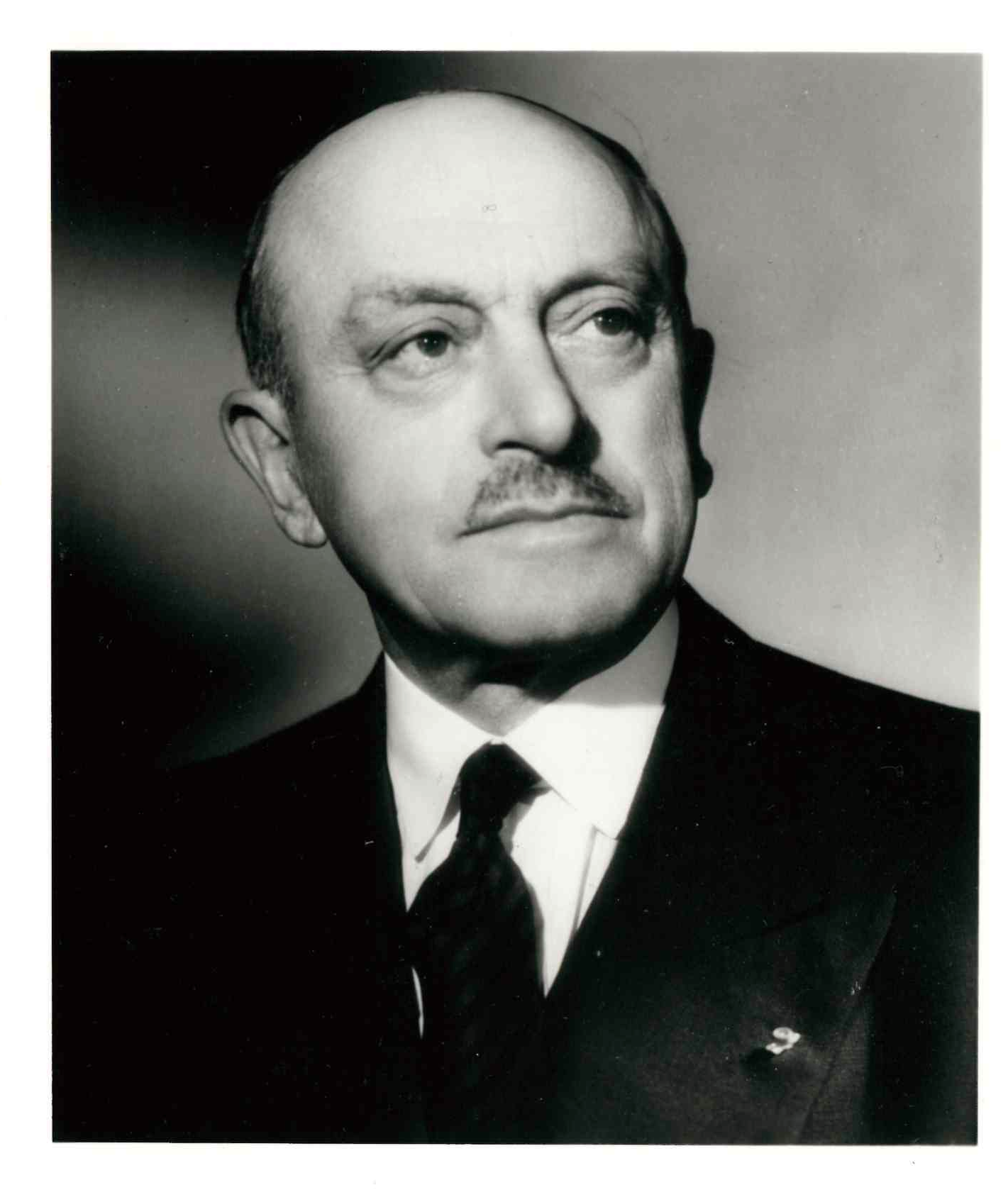
- Berthoin in 1950

Minister of the Interior
- In office 8 January 1959 – 27 May 1959
- President: Charles de Gaulle
- Prime Minister: Michel Debré
- Preceded by: Émile Pelletier
- Succeeded by: Pierre Chatenet

Personal details
- Born: 12 January 1895 Enghien-les-Bains, France
- Died: 25 February 1979 (aged 84) Paris, France
- Party: Radical Party
- Children: Georges Berthoin

Jean Berthoin (January 12, 1895 – February 25, 1979) was a French politician. As Minister of National Education under Charles de Gaulle, he instituted a policy of compulsory education for all children, both French and foreign citizens, until the age of sixteen, building on the earlier reforms of 1936. Implemented in 1959, this was known as the Berthoin Ordinance. He also suggested that the Baccalauréat be abolished, prompting a significant backlash in the Parisian press.

Prior to World War II, Berthoin had been the director of national security (Sûreté) in the French Interior Ministry.

Political offices
Preceded by André Marie	Minister of National Education; 1954–1956	Succeeded by René Billères
Preceded by Jacques Bordeneuve	Minister of National Education; 1958–1959	Succeeded by André Boulloche
Preceded by Émile Pelletier	Minister of the Interior; 1959	Succeeded by Pierre Chatenet
