= Louis Marlio =

French economist

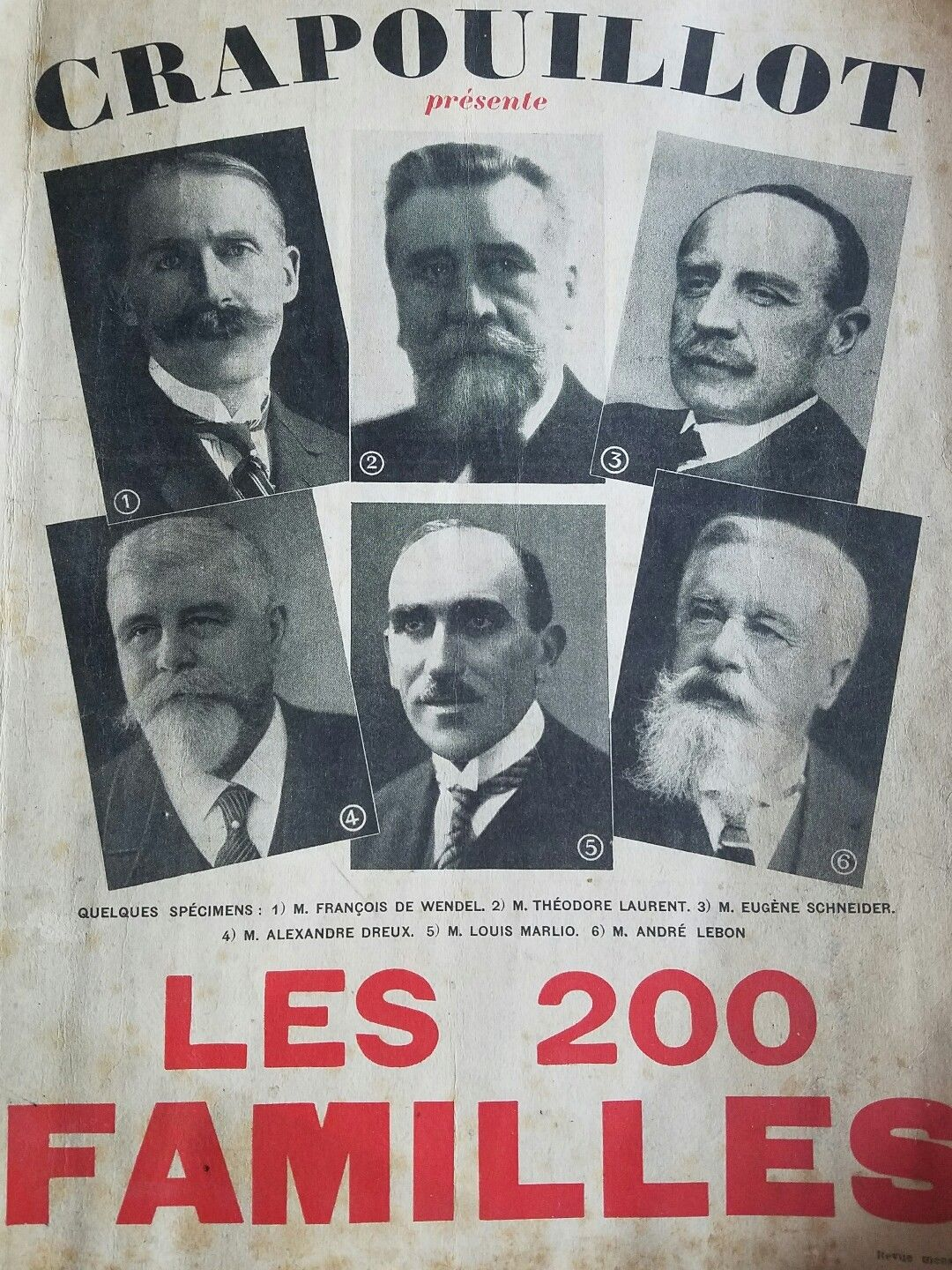
Cover of the Crapouillot, March 1936: François de Wendel (1), Théodore Laurent (2), Eugène II Schneider (3), Alexandre Dreux (4), Louis Marlo (5) and André Lebon (6)

Louis Marlio (February 3, 1878 – November 26, 1952) was a French economist. He was a professor at Sciences Po and École des ponts ParisTech in Paris.

== Life ==
He participated in the Colloque Walter Lippmann where he defended a social liberalism which favored a degree of state regulation over public services, social protection, and fiscal redistribution policies. He also admired radical and socialist politicians such as Aristide Briand.

== Principal works ==
- Études sur les aspects économiques des différentes ententes industrielles et internationales (1930)
- La Véritable Affaire de Panama (1932)
- L'Armistice de Versailles (1935)
- Le Sort du capitalisme, Flammarion, Bibliothèque de philosophie scientifique (1938)
- Dictature ou liberté, Flammarion, Bibliothèque de philosophie scientifique (1940)
- La Révolution d'hier, d'aujourd'hui et de demain (1943)
- The Control of Germany and Japan (1944)
- Le Libéralisme social (Conférence à la Société d'Économie Politique, 1946))
- The Aluminium Cartel (1947)
