= Albert Rivaud =

French philosopher and scholar (1876–1955)

- Born: 14 May 1876; Nice, France
- Died: 15 September 1955 (aged 79)

Philosophical work
- Era: 20th century
- Region: Western philosophy

Albert Rivaud

Minister of National Education
- In office 16 June 1940 – 12 July 1940
- Prime Minister: Philippe Pétain
- Preceded by: Yvon Delbos
- Succeeded by: Émile Mireaux

Albert Rivaud (French: [ʁivo]; 14 May 1876 – 15 September 1955) was a French philosopher and classical scholar.

== Biography ==
In 1908 he was appointed professor of philosophy at the University of Poitiers. In 1927 he succeeded Léon Brunschvicg as professor of philosophy at the Sorbonne.

He was a member of the Cercle Fustel de Coulanges.

From 17 June to 12 July 1940, he served as Minister of National Education in the government of Philippe Pétain.
