= Georges Ripert =

French lawyer (1880 - 1958)

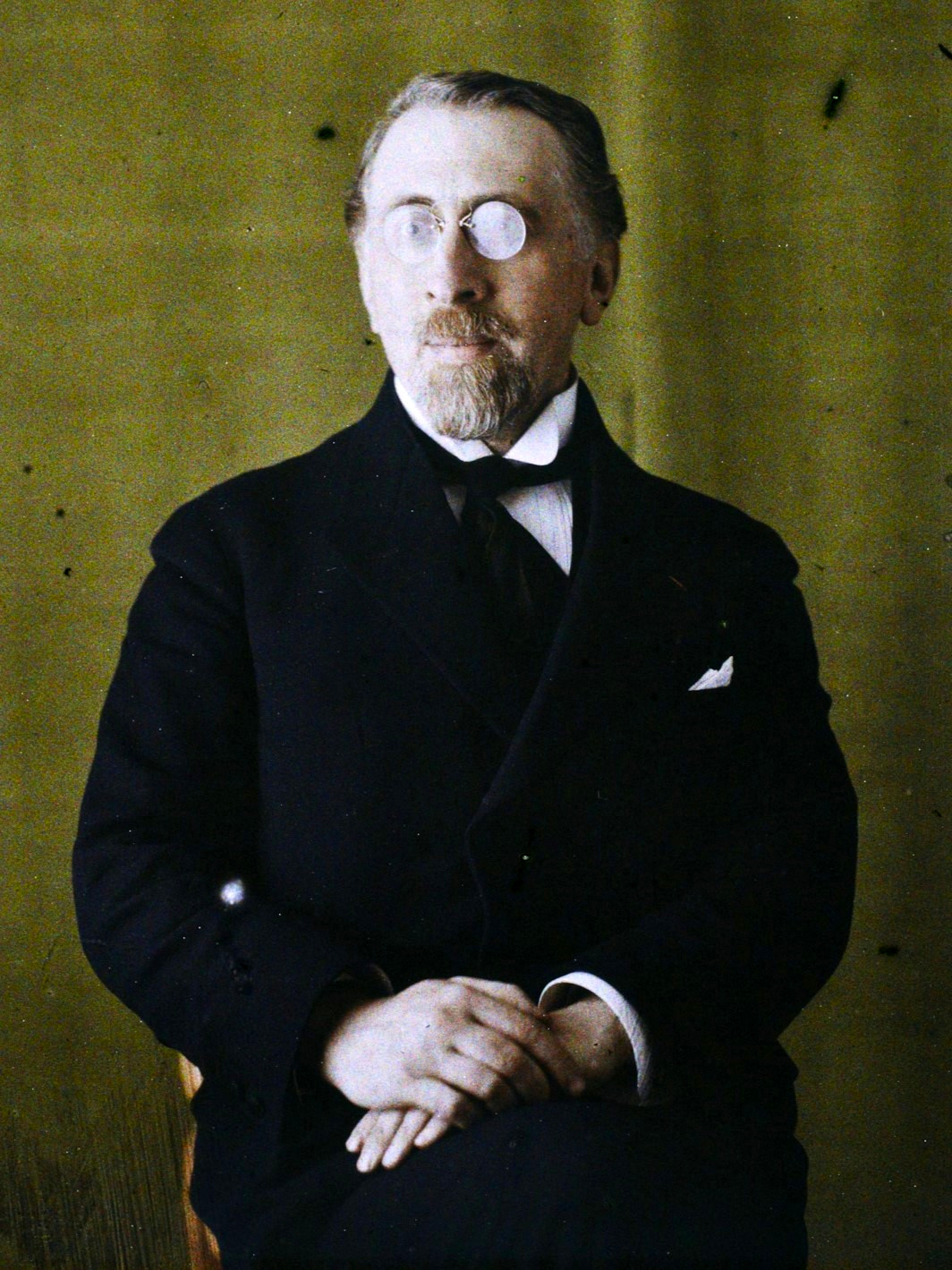
- 1927 Autochrome by Georges Chevalier

Secretary of State for Public Instruction and Youth
- In office 6 September 1940 – 13 December 1940
- Prime Minister: Philippe Pétain
- Preceded by: Émile Mireaux
- Succeeded by: Jacques Chevalier

Personal details
- Born: Louis-Marie-Adolphe-Georges Ripert; 22 April 1880 La Ciotat
- Died: 4 July 1958 (aged 78) Paris, France
- Occupation: Lawyer

Georges Ripert (22 April 1880 – 4 July 1958) was a lawyer who was briefly Secretary of State for Public Instruction and Youth in the Vichy Regime.

== Early career ==
Ripert received his agrégation in 1906 from the Faculty of Law of Aix. He taught Mercantile and Marine law at Aix. In 1919 he was called to Paris as a substitute for Marcel Planiol. Ripert undertook the revision of the Traité pratique de droit civil français by Marcel Planiol, which became a work edited by Ripert but with several authors. The 3-volume Traité élémentaire de droit civil by Planiol et Ripert was rewritten by Ripert and Jean Boulanger. The Traité de droit commercial was written by Ripert, then by Ripert and René Roblot. Other works were the Traité de droit maritime and essays such as La Règle morale dans les obligations civiles (1926) and Le Régime démocratique et le droit civil moderne (1936). As Dean of the Faculty of Law of Paris he welcomed Jews in the name of Christianity.

== World War II (1939–1944) ==
On 6 September 1940 Ripert was named Secretary of State for Public Instruction and Youth, replacing Émile Mireaux. As Minister of Public Instruction until December 1940 he contributed to elaborating the first Jewish Statute which excluded Jews from universities as students or teachers, and dismissed the Jewish professors, including his pre-war friend René Cassin. On 13 December 1940 Marshall Philippe Pétain asked all the ministers to sign a collective letter of resignation during a full cabinet meeting. Pierre Laval, then Minister of Justice, thought it was a device to get rid of René Belin, the Minister of Labor. However, the Marshal accepted the resignations of Laval and Ripert. Ripert returned to his position as Dean of the Faculty of Law of Paris. On 23 January 1941, he was made a member of the National Council of Vichy France. He remained a member of the National Council of Vichy throughout the war. He invited students to study National Socialist law objectively.

== Later career (1944–1958) ==
After the Liberation of France Ripert was arrested on 16 November 1944 and imprisoned until 14 February 1945. In 1947 the High Court of Justice dismissed his case for "acts of resistance", but no records of the trial were kept. Ripert was reinstated at the university and Institute. Ripert was Honorary Professor at the Faculty of Law in Paris until 1958. He remained conservative, and his Déclin du droit (1949) strongly criticized the post-war juridical situation. His Les Forces créatrices du droit (1955) also criticized the changes to civil law introduced by the new French republic. Ripert died suddenly in the morning of 4 July 1958 while correcting the proofs of the 3rd edition of his Traité de droit commercial. For his rigorous and elegantly written works Philippe Malaurie calls Ripert the greatest jurist of the 20th century.

== Publications ==
- Georges Ripert (1902), De l'Exercice du droit de propriété dans ses rapports avec les propriétés voisines (thesis), Paris: A. Rousseau / Université d'Aix-Marseille. Faculté de droit et des sciences économiques
- Georges Ripert (1904), Étude sur les plus-values indirectes résultant de l'exécution des travaux publics (thesis), Paris: A. Rousseau / Université d'Aix-Marseille. Faculté de droit et des sciences économiques
- Georges Ripert (1914), Traité général théorique et pratique de droit commercial, Paris: Rousseau, Edmond-Eugène Thaller
  - Georges Ripert; René Roblot (1994), Traité de droit commercial (14 ed.), Paris: LGDJ / Philippe Delebecque, Michel Germain
- Georges Ripert (1918), "Droit naturel et positivisme juridique", Annales de la Faculté de droit d'Aix, Nouvelle série (1), Marseille: impr. de Barlatier
- Georges Ripert (1922), Le Droit maritime, Saint-Dizier: Impr. des établissements Brulliard
- Marcel Planiol; Georges Ripert; René Savatier (1925–1934), Traité pratique de droit civil français, vol. I–XIV, Paris: Librairie générale de droit et de jurisprudence R. Pichon et R. Durand-Auzias
  - Jean Boulanger; Georges Ripert (1956–1959), Traité de droit civil d'après le traité de Planiol, vol. 1–4, Paris: Librairie générale de droit et de jurisprudence
- Georges Ripert (1926), La Règle morale dans les opérations civiles, Paris: R. Pichon et R. Durand-Auzias
- Marcel Planiol; Georges Ripert (1932), Traité élémentaire de droit civil, conforme au programme officiel des Facultés de droit (12 ed.), Paris: R. Pichon et R. Durand-Auzias
  - Jean Boulanger; Marcel Planiol; Georges Ripert (1942), Traité élémentaire de droit civil, Paris: R. Pichon et R. Durand-Auzias
- Georges Ripert (1936), Le Régime démocratique et le droit civil moderne, Paris: Libr. générale de droit et de jurisprudence
- Georges Ripert (1939), Précis de droit maritime, Paris: Dalloz
- Georges Ripert (1944), Cours de droit commercial, Paris: les Cours de droit
- Georges Ripert (1944), Législation maritime et aérienne comparée, Paris: Centre de documentation universitaire
- Georges Ripert (1946), Aspects juridiques du capitalisme moderne, Paris: Librairie générale de droit et de jurisprudence; (Laval, impr. de Barnéoud frères)
- Georges Ripert (1949), Le Déclin du droit : études sur la législation contemporaine, Paris: Librairie générale de droit et de jurisprudence
- Georges Ripert (1955), Les Forces créatrices du droit, Paris: Librairie générale de droit et de jurisprudence
- Paul Durand; Georges Ripert; René Roblot (1960), Le Droit fiscal des affaires après la réforme fiscale, Paris: Librairie générale de droit et de jurisprudence (Laval, impr. Barnéoud)
- Georges Ripert; René Roblot (1981), Valeurs mobilières, effets de commerce, opérations de banque et de bourse, contrats commerciaux, liquidation des biens, suspension provisoire des poursuites (9 ed.), Paris: Librairie générale de droit et de jurisprudence

== Sources ==
- Bousquet, Pierre (1983), Histoire de l'administration de l'enseignement en France, 1789–1981, Librairie Droz, ISBN 978-2-600-03393-0
- Georges Ripert (1880-1958) (in French), BnF: Bibliothèque nationale de France
- Mainguy, Daniel, Bio de juristes : Ripert (in French)
- Solus, Henry (1958), "Le Doyen Georges Ripert", Revue internationale de droit comparé (in French), 10 (4)
- Warner, Geoffrey (1968), Pierre Laval and the Eclipse of France, New York: The Macmillan Company
