= Jean Ernest Mercier =

French politician, translator and historian

Ernest Mercier
- Born: 17 September 1840; La Rochelle
- Died: May 16, 1907 (aged 66)
- Spouse: Marie-Ernestine de Styx
- Children: Ernest Mercier

Jean Ernest Mercier (17 September 1840 – 16 May 1907) was a translator, historian and French politician

== Life ==
Jean Ernest Mercier was the grandson of a sub-prefect, mayor of the department of Doubs, and the son of a military surgeon who took part in the French conquest of Algeria.

On completion of his studies at the college of La Rochelle he followed his father to Algeria. His interest in the national history led him to join the Algerian Historical Society in 1863.

He was appointed military-interpreter of the Arabic language, attached to the superior commander of Sebdou (province of Oran), in 1865, then interpreter-judicial near the justice of peace of El Harrouch in 1866 and Ténès in 1869, before becoming sworn in as an interpreter-translator of Constantine in 1871.

In 1870 he was elected lieutenant of the 2nd company, then captain commanding Tenes' militia. He became a lieutenant in the 7th Territorial Battalion, commanding the 3rd company in 1876.

He became vice-president of the Archaeological Society of Constantine in 1875, as well as a member of the Société asiatique de Paris in 1878 and of the eastern section of the school of letters of Algiers in 1881.

Elected city councilor of Constantine in 1881 and re-elected in 1884, he was unanimously elected mayor in 1883, 1896 and 1900.

== Publications ==
- Des Abus du régime judiciaire des indigènes de l'Algérie et des principales modifications à y apporter, Paris, Challamel, 1870.
- Des abus du régime judiciaire des indigènes de l'Algérie, Constantine, Arnolet, 1870.
- Comment l'Afrique septentrionale a été arabisée —'How North Africa has been Arabized. Summary extract of the history of the establishment of the Arabs in North Africa, Constantine, Impr. L. Marle, 1874.
- Histoire de l'établissement des Arabes dans l'Afrique septentrionale —'History of the establishment of the Arabs in North Africa according to the documents provided by the Arab authors and in particular by the History of the Berbers of Ibn Khaldun', Constantine, Impr. L. Marle, 1875.
- Constantine avant la conquête française, 1837 — 'Constantine before the French conquest, 1837: notice on this city at the time of the last bey', Constantine, typography L. Arnolet, Ad. Braham, 1878.
- Constantine au XVIe siècle — 'Constantine of the 16th century'. Elevation of the El-Feggoun family, Constantine, impr. L. Arnolet, 1879.
- Constantine avant la conquête française —'Constantine before the French conquest (1837). Notice on this city at the time of the last bey, Constantine, Impr. A. Braham, 1879.
- International Exhibition of 1878 in Paris, Group V, Class 49, Ministry of Agriculture and Commerce, Paris, Imprimerie Nationale, 1880.
- L'Algérie en 1880 — Algeria in 1880 , Paris, Challamel Elder, 1880.
- International Universal Exhibition of 1878, in Paris, group VII, classes 72 and 73, Ministry of Agriculture and Commerce, Paris, Imprimerie Nationale, 1880.
- Le Cinquantenaire d'une colonie —The fiftieth anniversary of a colony: Algeria in 1880, Paris, Challamel elder, 1880.
- L'Algérie et les questions algériennes — Algeria and Algerian issues. Historical, Statistical and Economic Study, Paris, Challamel Elder, 1883.
- Commune of Constantine: Three years of municipal administration (from May 20, 1884 to October 10, 1887)', Constantine, impr. Ad. Braham, 1887.
- Histoire de l'Afrique septentrionale (Berbérie) depuis les temps les plus reculés jusqu'à la conquête française (1830) — History of Northern Africa (Berberia) from the earliest times to the French conquest (1830) , Paris, E. Lerou
- La France dans le Sahara et au Soudan —France in the Sahara and Sudan, Paris, E. Leroux, 1889.
- La propriété foncière chez les musulmans d'Algérie—'Land ownership among the Muslims of Algeria', Paris, E. Leroux, 1891.
- La France dans l'Afrique centrale en 1893 —France in Central Africa in 1893', Constantine, impr. A. Braham, 1893.
- La propriété en Maghreb selon la doctrine de Malek — Property in Maghreb according to the doctrine of Malek, Paris, Impr. national, 1894.
- Le hobous ou ouakof : ses règles et sa jurisprudence —The hobous or ouakof: its rules and its jurisprudence', Alger, A. Jourdan, 1895.
- La condition de la femme musulmane dans l'Afrique septentrionale —'The condition of the Muslim woman in northern Africa', Alger, A. Jourdan, 1895.
- La Population indigène de l'Afrique sous la domination romaine, vandale et byzantine —'The indigenous population of Africa under Roman domination, vandal and Byzantine', Constantine, Adolphe Braham, 1896.
- Les deux sièges de Constantine (1836-1837) —'The two seats of Constantine (1836-1837)', with a map of the city in 1837 and 4 illustrations after Horace Vernet, Constantine, L. Poulet, 1896.
- La Propriété foncière musulmane en Algérie— 'Muslim Land Ownership in Algeria', Algiers, AD. Jourdan, 1898.
- Deuxième étude sur les Hobous ou Ouakof — 'Second study on Hobous or Ouakof', Algiers, Jourdan, 1898.
- La propriété indigène en Magreb —'Native property in Magreb', Constantine, Braham, 1899.
- Le code du hobous ou ouakf selon la législation musulmane —'The code of the hobous or ouakf according to the Moslem legislation', Constantine, D. Braham, 1899.
- La question de l'assistance publique musulmane—'The question of Muslim public assistance,' Constantine, [s. n.], 1899.
- Le Code du hobous ou ouakf, selon la législation musulmane—'The Code of hobous or ouakf, according to Muslim legislation', followed by texts of good authors and original pieces, Constantine, impr. D. Braham, 1899.
- Les Idées et les actes du Maréchal Valée d'après des documents nouveaux—'The Ideas and Acts of Marshal Vallee from New Documents", Constantine, Adolphe Braham, 1900.
- Les ribat' et les marabouts dans l'Afrique du Nord—'The ribat 'and the marabouts in North Africa', 'Constantine, Imprimerie-Librairie Adolphe Braham, D. Braham son successor, 1901.
- La Question indigène en Algérie au commencement du XXe siècle —'The Native Question in Algeria at the Beginning of the XXth century,' Paris, A. Challamel, 1901.
- Histoire de Constantine —'History of Constantine,' Constantine, J. Marle and F. Biron, 1903.

== Bibliography ==
- Africa through her sons: Ernest Mercier, historian of North Africa, mayor of Constantine , Archaeological Society of the Department of Constantine, 1944.
- Mercier (Jean-Ernest), in Alain Messaoud, The Arabists and Colonial France. Annexes , 2015.
