= Redressement Français =

French anti-parliamentarian political movement

The Redressement Français (French Resurgence) was a French anti-parliamentarian movement founded in 1926 by the electricity magnate Ernest Mercier. It advocated technocratic corporatism – a "government of authority" – instead of a government of politicians.

Among its newspapers was the Revue Hebdomadaire.
