= Étienne Mantoux =

French economist

Étienne Mantoux (5 February 1913 – 29 April 1945) was a French economist, born in Paris. He was the son of Paul Mantoux. He is probably best known for his book The Carthaginian Peace, or the Economic Consequences of Mr. Keynes published two years after it was completed and one year after his death. In it, he sought to demonstrate that much of John Maynard Keynes' beliefs about the consequences of the Treaty of Versailles for Germany as expressed in The Economic Consequences of the Peace were wrong.

In opposition to Keynes he held that justice demanded that Germany should have paid for the whole damage caused by World War I, and he set out to prove that many of Keynes' forecasts were not verified by subsequent events. For example, Keynes believed European output in iron would decrease but by 1929 iron output in Europe was up 10% from the 1913 figure. Keynes predicted that German iron and steel output would decrease but by 1927 steel output increased by 30% and iron output increased by 38% from 1913 (within the pre-war borders). Keynes also argued that German coal mining efficiency would decrease but labour efficiency by 1929 had increased on the 1913 figure by 30%. Keynes contended that Germany would be unable to export coal immediately after the Treaty but German net coal exports were 15 million tons within a year and by 1926 the tonnage exported reached 35 million. He also put forward the claim that German national savings in the years after the Treaty would be less than 2 billion marks: however in 1925 the German national savings figure was estimated at 6.4 billion marks and in 1927 7.6 billion marks. Keynes also believed that Germany would be unable to pay the 2 billion marks-plus in reparations for the next 30 years, but Mantoux contends that German rearmament spending was seven times as much as that figure in each year between 1933 and 1939.

The Canadian economist Jacob Viner called Mantoux's book an "extremely searching criticism" and "detailed economic critique" of Keynes that demonstrated "with the benefit of hindsight" that Keynes' political and economic judgments were unsound. René Albrecht-Carrié agreed with Mantoux's argument that Germany could have paid reparations, although he doubted the political feasibility of extracting them from Germany. He also claimed that Mantoux "ruthlessly exposed" the "loose and fallacious thinking of Keynes and others": "In the light of so much misplaced sentimentalizing as subsequently prevailed, it is well to have it pointed out that to exact reparation is not so much to perpetuate old grievances as to remove existing ones". Michael Heilperin claimed that Mantoux demonstrated that Keynes greatly overestimated the damage done to Germany by the Versailles Treaty and that he had considerably underestimated the capacity of Germany to pay. The experience of the interwar years, according to Heilperin, demonstrated that Keynes had got it wrong. William Rappard said that Mantoux's book was a "very careful, thoughtful, and well-informed refutation of the brilliantly successful but eminently unfair, misleading, and supremely pernicious efforts of Keynes to discredit the peace treaties of 1919" and concluded that Mantoux's book was a "product of the most painstaking scientific craftsmanship and of a political sagacity for which many elder men may well envy its youthful author".

A. J. P. Taylor claimed that Mantoux had "demonstrated that the Germans could have paid reparations, without impoverishment, if they had wanted to do so; and Hitler gave a practical demonstration of this when he extracted vast sums from the Vichy government of France". He also said that The Carthaginian Peace demolished Keynes' thesis. Stephen A. Schuker claimed that Keynes' "tendentious but influential" book was "ably refuted" by Mantoux. Peter Liberman wrote in 1996 that the French view, "that Germany could pay and only lacked the requisite will", has "gained support from recent historical research".

On the other hand, Charles Feinstein criticised Mantoux's argument that the Allies could have collected reparations as the German economy grew and for pointing out the reluctance of the Germans to pay more taxes when they already saw reparations as oppressive and unjust. Feinstein concluded, "The payments were a paramount cause of instability and a barrier to international economic co-operation".

Mantoux was killed in action eight days before Germany unconditionally surrendered on 9 May 1945 whilst fighting with the Free French Forces in Bavaria.

== Works ==
- "La Théorie générale de M. Keynes" par Etienne Mantoux, Revue d'économie politique, vol. 51, no 6, novembre-décembre 1937, pp. 1559–1590. Paris: Librairie Sirey, 1937.
- The Carthaginian Peace, The Economic Consequences of Mr Keynes, Oxford University Press, 1946, xvii+210pp. (written in English)
