= Michel Tony-Révillon =

French politician

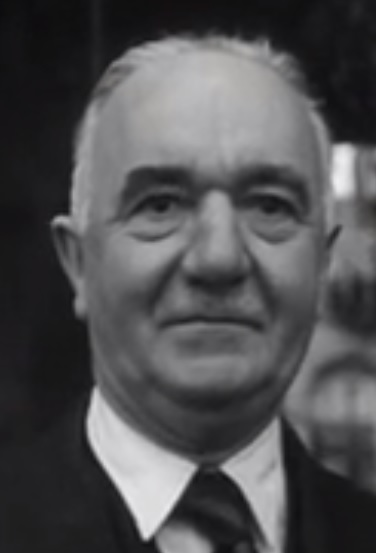
Image of Tony-Revillon

Michel Tony-Révillon (24 April 1891 in Paris – 11 January 1957) was a French politician. He represented the Radical Party in the Chamber of Deputies from 1932 to 1935, in the Senate from 1935 to 1940, in the Constituent Assembly elected in 1945, in the Constituent Assembly elected in 1946 and in the National Assembly from 1946 to 1957. He was Minister of National Education in 1948.
