= Agénor Bardoux =

French politician (1829–1897)

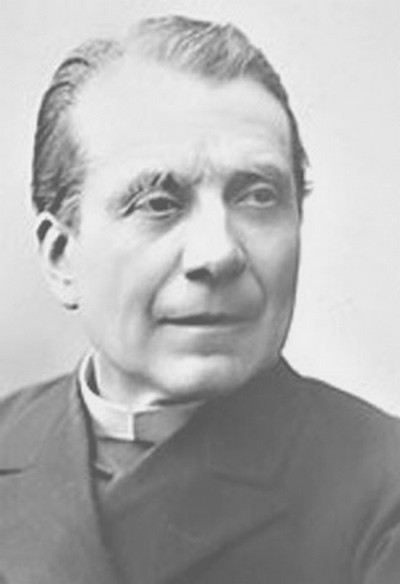
Agénor Bardoux (unknown photographer, unknown date, probably before 1880).

Agénor Bardoux (15 January 1829, Bourges, Cher – 23 November 1897, Paris) was a French statesman and republican.

== Early life ==
A native of Bourges, he was born on 15 January 1829. He was a son of Jacques Bardoux (1795–1871) and the former Thérèse Pignet (1807–1883).

== Career ==
Bardoux was established as an advocate in Clermont-Ferrand, and did not hesitate to proclaim his Republican sympathies. In 1871 he was elected deputy of the French National Assembly, and re-elected in 1876 and in 1877. In the chamber he was president of the Centre gauche group, standing strongly for the republic but against anti-clericalism, and during the constitutional crisis of May 1877 he was one of the 363 signatories to the vote of no confidence. In the subsequently elected republican chamber he became minister of public instruction (December 1877) and proposed various republican laws, notably on compulsory primary education. He resigned in 1879. He was not re-elected in 1881 but in December 1882 was named senator for life.

== Personal life ==
On 15 July 1873, he married Clémence Villa (1847–1939) in Montpellier. She was a daughter of Achille Villa and the former Sophie Bimar. Together, they had at least one son:

- Jacques Bardoux (1874–1959), the French senator and academic who married Henriette Marie Geneviève Picot.

Bardoux died in Paris on 23 November 1897.

=== Descendants ===
Through Jacques, he was a great-grandfather of Valéry Giscard d'Estaing (b. 1926) was president of France from 1974 until 1981.
