= Tony Garnier =

Tony Garnier may refer to:

- Tony Garnier (architect) (1869–1948), French architect and city planner
- Tony Garnier (musician) (born 1955), American bassist
- Halle Tony Garnier, French concert hall
