= List of aerial victories of Wilhelm Frankl =

List of aerial victories of Wilhelm Frankl

== Background ==
Wilhelm Frankl (1893-1917) was a German First World War fighter ace credited with 20 confirmed aerial victories. He scored his first aerial victory with a carbine on 10 May 1915, before the Fokker Eindecker, the world's first dedicated fighter airplane, came into use. Once Frankl was equipped with an Eindecker, he became part of Germany's air superiority offensive, the Fokker Scourge, shooting down eight more enemy airplanes. He became one of the first eight aces in Germany's service, and one of its first winners of the prestigious Pour le Merite. As such, he was appointed to lead one of the world's first fighter squadrons, Jagdstaffel 4. Although he died fighting for Germany on 8 April 1917, in later years the Nazis would ignore his wartime conversion to Christianity, and expunge his heroic record because he was Jewish.

== The victory list ==
Wilhelm Frankl's victories are reported in chronological order, which is not necessarily the order or dates the victories were confirmed by headquarters.

No.	Date	Time	Foe	Unit	Location	Remarks
1	10 May 1915		Voisin			Downed with a five shot carbine
2	10 January 1916		Voisin		Woumen, Diksmuide, Belgium	
3	19 January 1916		Voisin		Woumen, Diksmuide, Belgium	No corresponding report of loss
4	1 February 1916		Voisin		Chaulnes, France	No corresponding report of loss
5	4 May 1916		Royal Aircraft Factory BE.2c	No. 7 Squadron RFC	South of Warneton, France	Loss of Life: 2 Lt. Edward Gurney Ryckman, of Toronto, ON and Lieutenant John Romeyn Dennistoun of Winnipeg, Canada
6	21 May 1916		Royal Aircraft Factory FE.2b	No. 20 Squadron RFC	Houthem, Belgium	
Unconfirmed	1 July 1916		Royal Aircraft Factory FE.2c	No. 12 Squadron RFC		
7	2 August 1917	p.m.	Morane-Saulnier BB	No. 26 Squadron RFC	Beaumetz, France	
8	9 or 10 August 1916		Voisin? Royal Aircraft Factory BE.2d?			Does not match opposing losses on either date
9	9 or 10 August 1916		Enemy airplane			No further details; no match to opposing losses on either date
10	7 September 1916		Nieuport		Northeast of Combles, France	
Unconfirmed	8 September 1916		Caudron			
11	15 September 1916		Nieuport		Peronne, France	
12	17 September 1916	1135 hours	Royal Aircraft Factory FE.2b	No. 11 Squadron RFC	Equancourt, France	
Unconfirmed	22 September 1916		Royal Aircraft Factory BE.12	No. 19 Squadron RFC	Near Le Transloy, France	Victory awarded to a Jagdstaffel 2 pilot
13	26 September 1916	0920 hours	Caudron		Rancourt, France	
14	10 October 1916	1330 hours	Nieuport		Villers-Carbonnel, France	
15	22 October 1916	1145 hours	Sopwith 1 1/2 Strutter	No. 45 Squadron RFC	Driencourt, France	
16	6 April 1916	0730 hours	Royal Aircraft Factory FE.2b	No. 100 Squadron RFC	Quiéry-la-Motte, France	
17	6 April 1917	0850 hours	Royal Aircraft Factory FE.2b	No. 11 Squadron RFC	Fauchy	
18	6 April 1917	0855 hours	Royal Aircraft Factory FE.2b	No. 11 Squadron RFC	Arras, France	
19	6 April 1917	0955 hours	Royal Aircraft Factory BE.2c	No. 2 Squadron RFC	Douai, France	
20	7 April 1917	1925 hours	Nieuport 17	No. 60 Squadron RFC	Southeast of Fampoux, France	

Background information from Above the Lines and The Aerodrome website. Supplemental information cited in individual victories and claims. Abbreviations were expanded by the editor creating this list.

== Sources ==
- Franks, Norman (2001). Sharks Among Minnows: Germany's First Fighter Pilots and the Fokker Eindecker Period, July 1915 to September 1916. London: Grub Street Publishing. ISBN 9781902304922.
- Franks, Norman; Bailey, Frank; Guest, Russell (1993). Above the Lines: The Aces and Fighter Units of the German Air Service, Naval Air Service and Flanders Marine Corps, 1914–1918. London UK: Grub Street Publishing. ISBN 978-0-948817-73-1.
- VanWyngarden, Greg (2006). Early German Aces of World War I. Oxford UK: Osprey Publishing. ISBN 978-1-84176-997-4.
