= Exposition internationale urbaine de Lyon =

Exposition International urbaine de Lyon

1914 Lyon

Overview
- BIE-class: Unrecognized exposition
- Name: L'exposition internationale urbaine de Lyon
- Area: 184.3 acres (74.6 hectares)
- Organized by: Édouard Herriot

Location
- Country: France
- City: Lyon
- Venue: Gerland
- Coordinates: 45°43′48″N 4°49′30″E

Timeline
- Opening: 1 May 1914
- Closure: 1 November 1914

Universal Expositions
- Previous: Exposition universelle et internationale (1913) in Ghent
- Next: Panama–Pacific International Exposition in San Francisco

The Exposition internationale urbaine de Lyon was the 1914 World's Fair in the French city of Lyon. The exposition focused on urban planning and public health. Lyon's mayor, Édouard Herriot, organised the exposition with the architect Tony Garnier and medical doctor Jules Courmont.

In the Gerland neighbourhood, part of the 7th arrondissement of Lyon, a 184 acres exhibition area was created, with the Tony Ganier exhibition hall, an Alpine village, a horticultural garden, several pavilions for foreign nations, and dedicated pavilions for the French colonies and the silk industry. On 1 May 1914, the exposition was opened and the French President, Raymond Poincaré, visited the exposition on 22 and 24 May. The exposition was planned to last until 1 November but the First World War disturbed the plans and led to the forced closure of the Austrian and German pavilions on 2 August 1914. After this, many other participants left the exposition and at the official closure on 1 November many pavilions had already been empty for a long time as a result. The remarkable Halle Tony Garnier, was used as an arms factory during the war and afterwards used as slaughterhouse. In 1988, it was reconstructed as an exhibition and event center.
