= Jacques Debat-Ponsan =

French architect

Jacques Harold Edouard Debat-Ponsan (Copenhagen, 21 August 1882 – Paris, 1942) was a French architect.

== Life ==
Debat-Ponsan studied in the atelier of Victor Laloux at the École nationale supérieure des Beaux-Arts in Paris. He took the Prix de Rome in 1912 and was resident at the Villa Medici from January 1913 to February 1915.

Following the First World War, Debat-Ponsan was engaged in reconstruction projects, then in 1928 was named architect-in-chief of the French national Postes, télégraphes et téléphones administration (PTT).

Debat-Ponsan was the son of French painter Édouard Debat-Ponsan, and the uncle of French Prime Minister Michel Debré.

== Work ==
- Paris telephone central office for exchange "Ségur", 55 Avenue de Saxe (1900)
- urban planning and reconstruction of Cambrai, with fellow architects Pierre Leprince-Ringuet and Marc Germain Debré (beginning 1919)
- reconstruction of Driencourt (1920-1927)
- PTT Administration Building, 20 Avenue de Segur (1931-1939)
- Paris telephone central office for exchange "Suffren", Avenue de Suffren (1933)
- École Jean-Baptiste Clément, Boulogne-Billancourt (1934)
- Unité de formation et de recherche biomédicale des Saints-Pères at Paris Descartes University, with Louis Madeline and Armand Guéritte (begun 1936, interrupted by the war, dedicated 1953)
- Villa Douce, Reims, with Pol Gosset (1929-1932)
- Hôtel de Ville, Boulogne-Billancourt (with Tony Garnier) (1934)
