= Édouard Debat-Ponsan =

French painter (1847–1913)

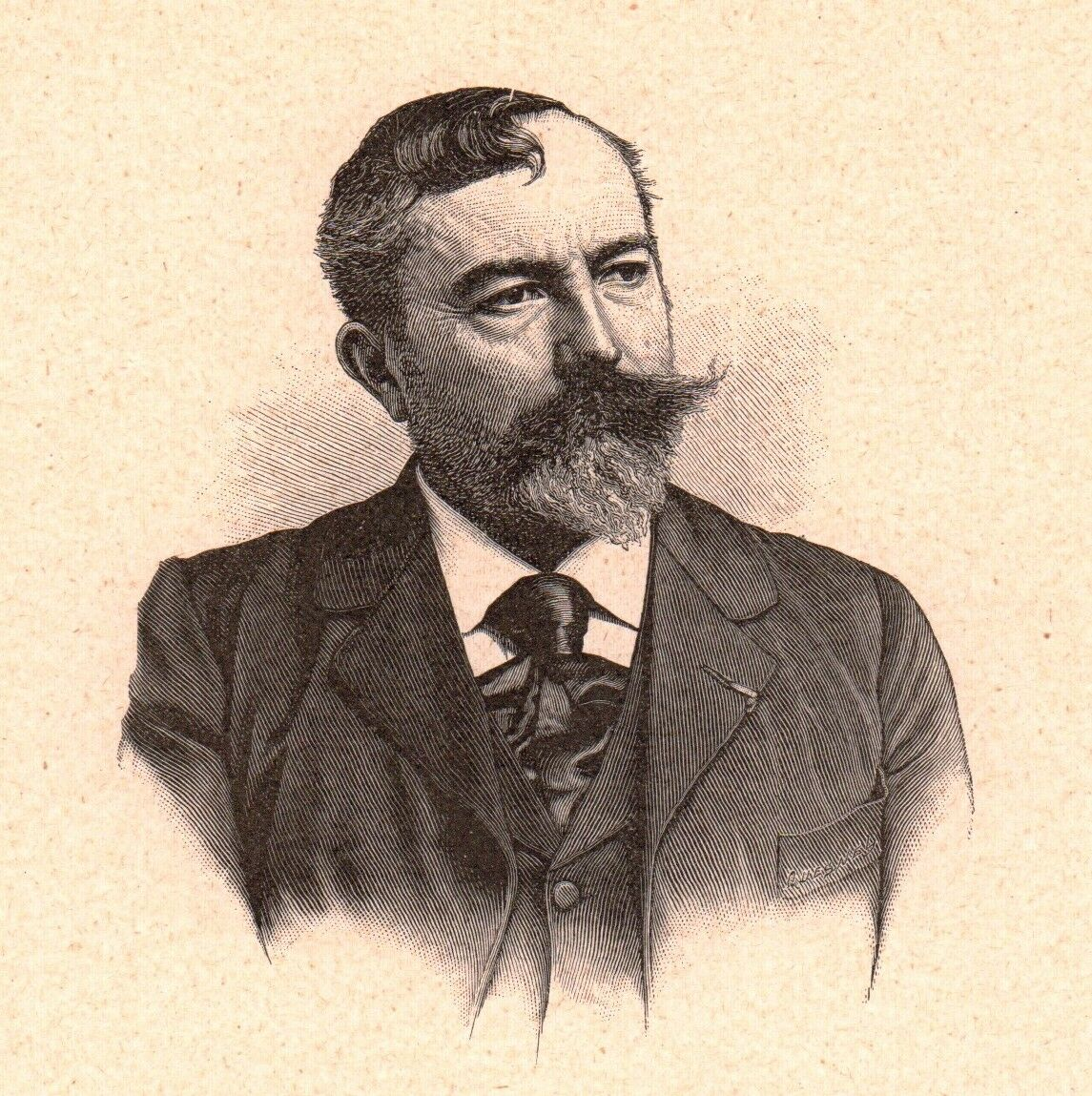
- Édouard Debat-Ponsan, c. 1901
- Born: 25 April 1847; Toulouse, France
- Died: 29 January 1913 (aged 65); Paris, France
- Education: Cabanel
- Known for: Painting
- Movement: Academic art, Oriental themes

Édouard Debat-Ponsan (25 April 1847 – 29 January 1913) was a French academic painter noted for his allegorical works, scenes of peasant life and Orientalist works.

== Biography ==
Debat-Ponsan was born in Toulouse. His younger brother was organist and composer Georges Debat-Ponsan, best known for his organ work Scherzo Symphonique. A pupil of Cabanel, he was famous for his portraits of wealthy citizens and politicians in Paris, paintings of ancient history and scenes of peasant life. As a Republican and veteran of the War of 1870, Debat-Ponsan engaged in the struggle for rehabilitation of Captain Alfred Dreyfus, he exhibited his allegorical painting Vérité sortant du puits (Truth coming out of the well) at the 1898 Salon, later offered to Émile Zola.

In 1877 he travelled to Italy thanks to a sum of 4,000 francs which was granted to him by the academy. There he saw different forms of painting, after which he began to paint portraits. In 1882–1883 he made a trip to Istanbul accompanied by his two brothers-in-law, Jules-Arsène Garnier and Henri-Eugène Delacroix (not to be confused with Eugène Delacroix). This trip inspired one of his most celebrated works, Le Massage, Scène de Hammam (The Massage at the Hamman; 1883) now in the Musée des Augustins in Toulouse.

He was father of the architect and Grand Prix de Rome winner in 1912, Jacques Debat-Ponsan, and grandfather of Michel Debré, who became Prime Minister under General Charles de Gaulle and was one of the drafters of the Fifth Republic. Other descendants include the politician Jean-Louis Debré. His daughter Jeanne Debat-Ponsan married Robert Debré founder of modern pediatrics in France (see Debré family).

Debat-Ponsan died in Paris on 29 January 1913.

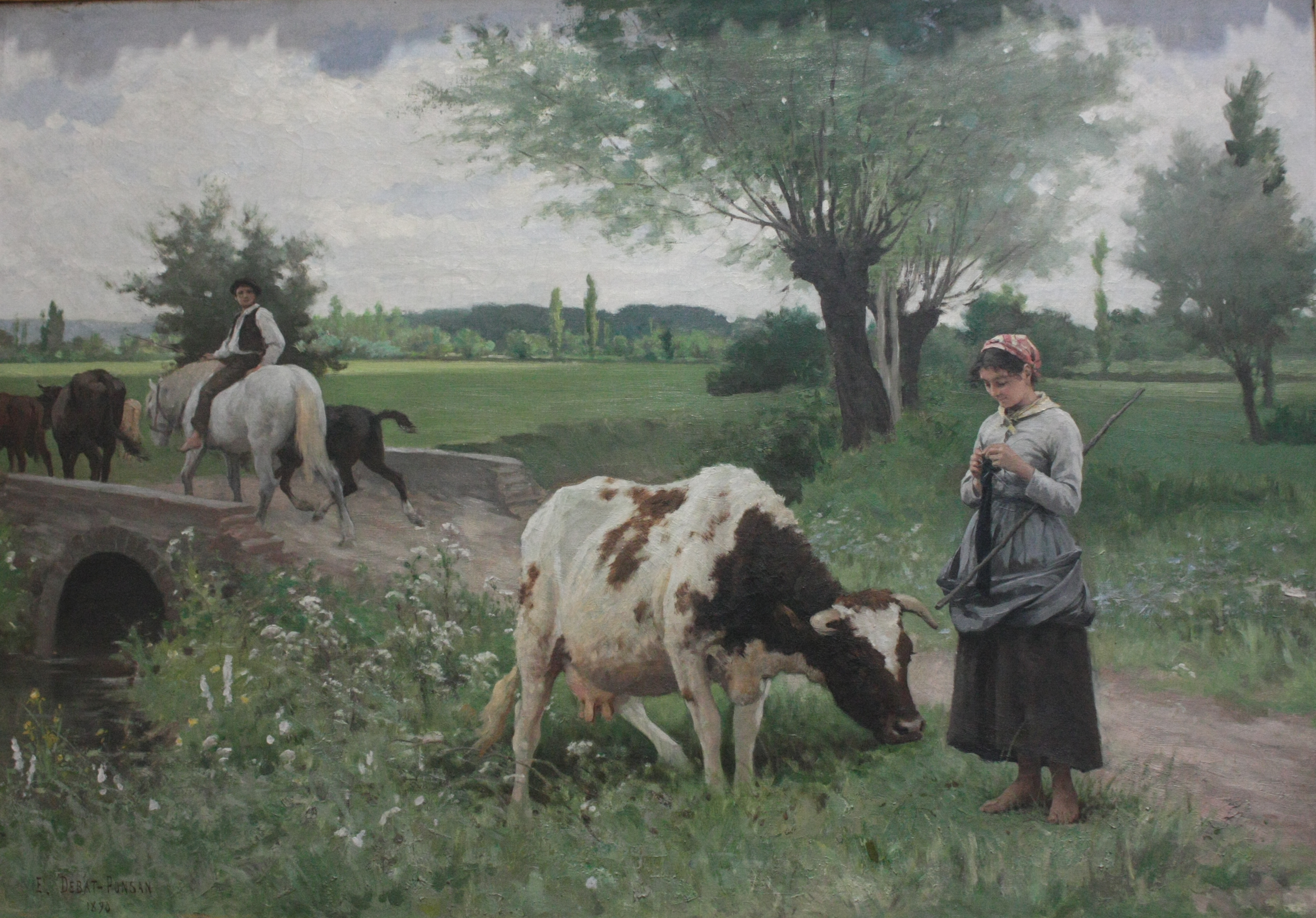
La Vache bien gardée, 1890

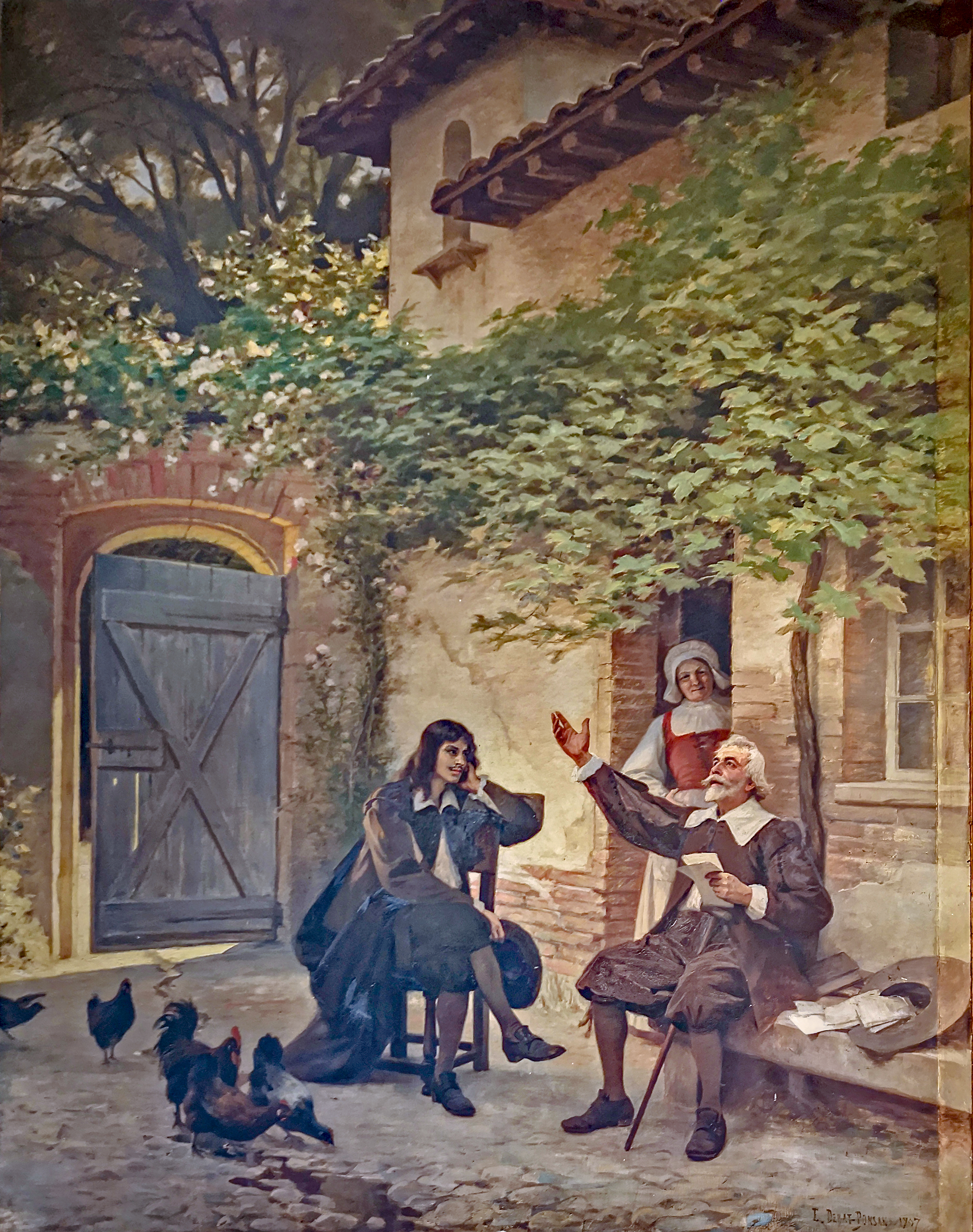
Molière et Goudouli,1907

== Work ==
His scenes of rural life, a very fashionable genre around 1830–1840, hesitate between the idealism of the peasant world and the militant realism of a Gustave Courbet. The painting One morning at the gates of the Louvre may have political overtones. It depicts Catherine de' Medici (in black) calmly viewing the bodies of victims of the 1572 St. Bartholomew's Day massacre. Debat-Ponsan may have actually intended to refer to more recent events in French history, such as the bloody suppression of the Commune of Paris, nine years before this painting was made.

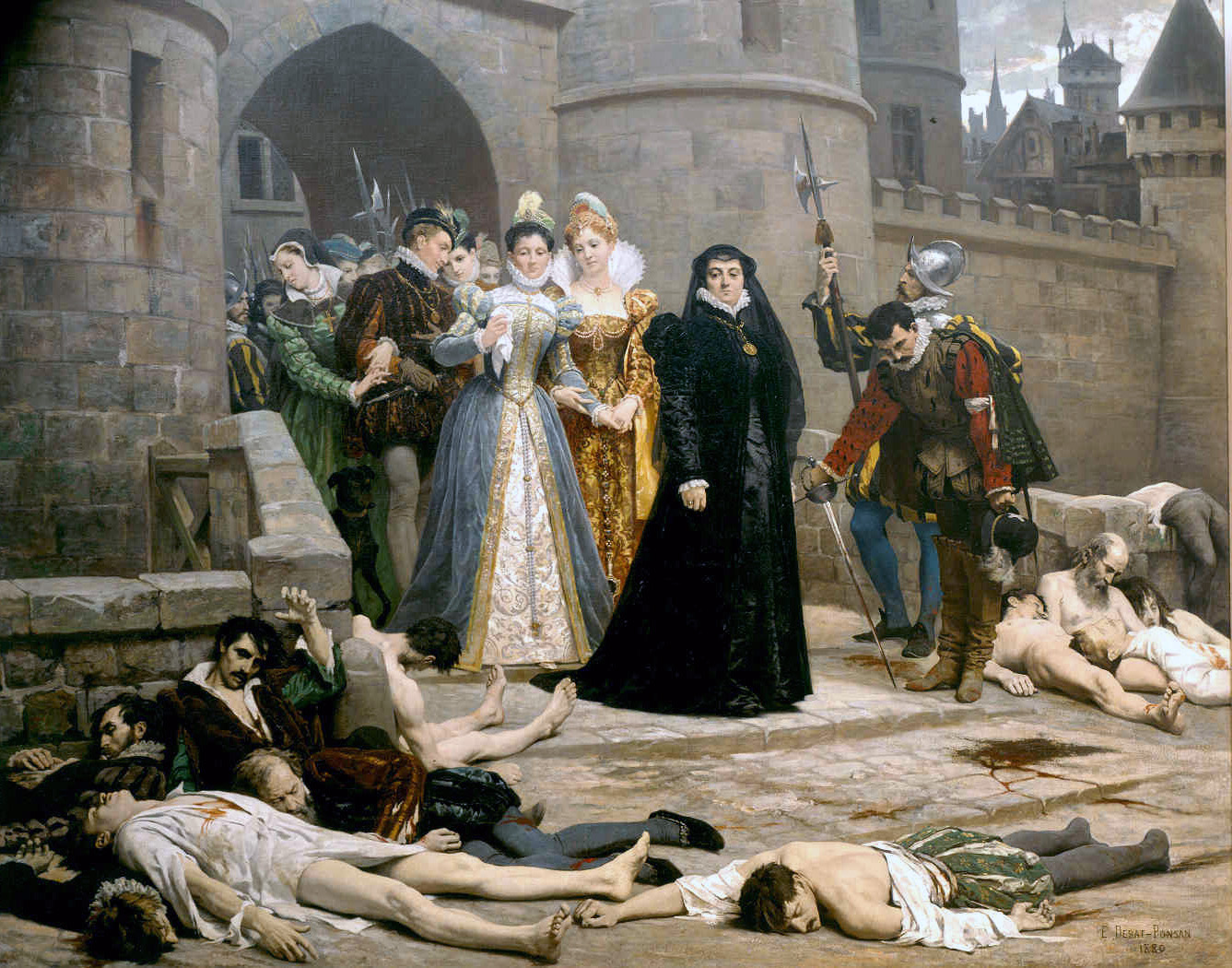
One morning at the gates of the Louvre, 1880

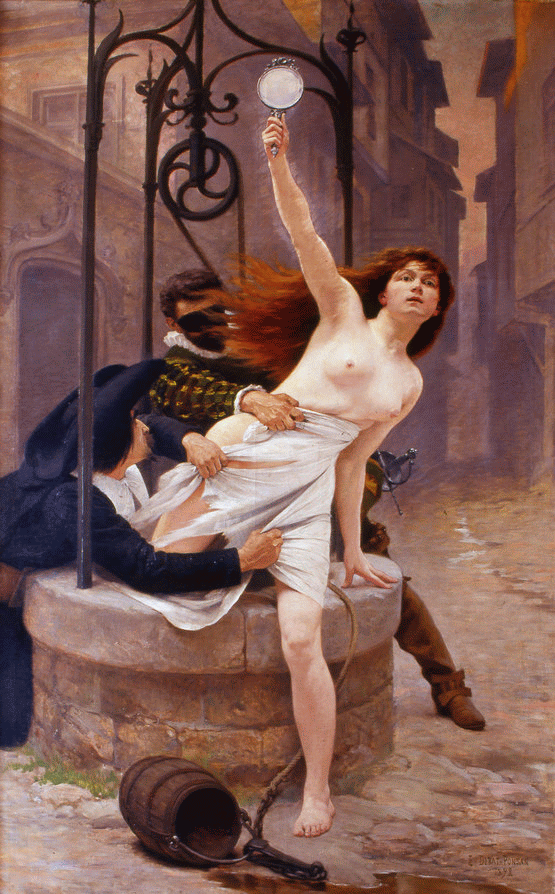
Truth coming out of the well, 1898

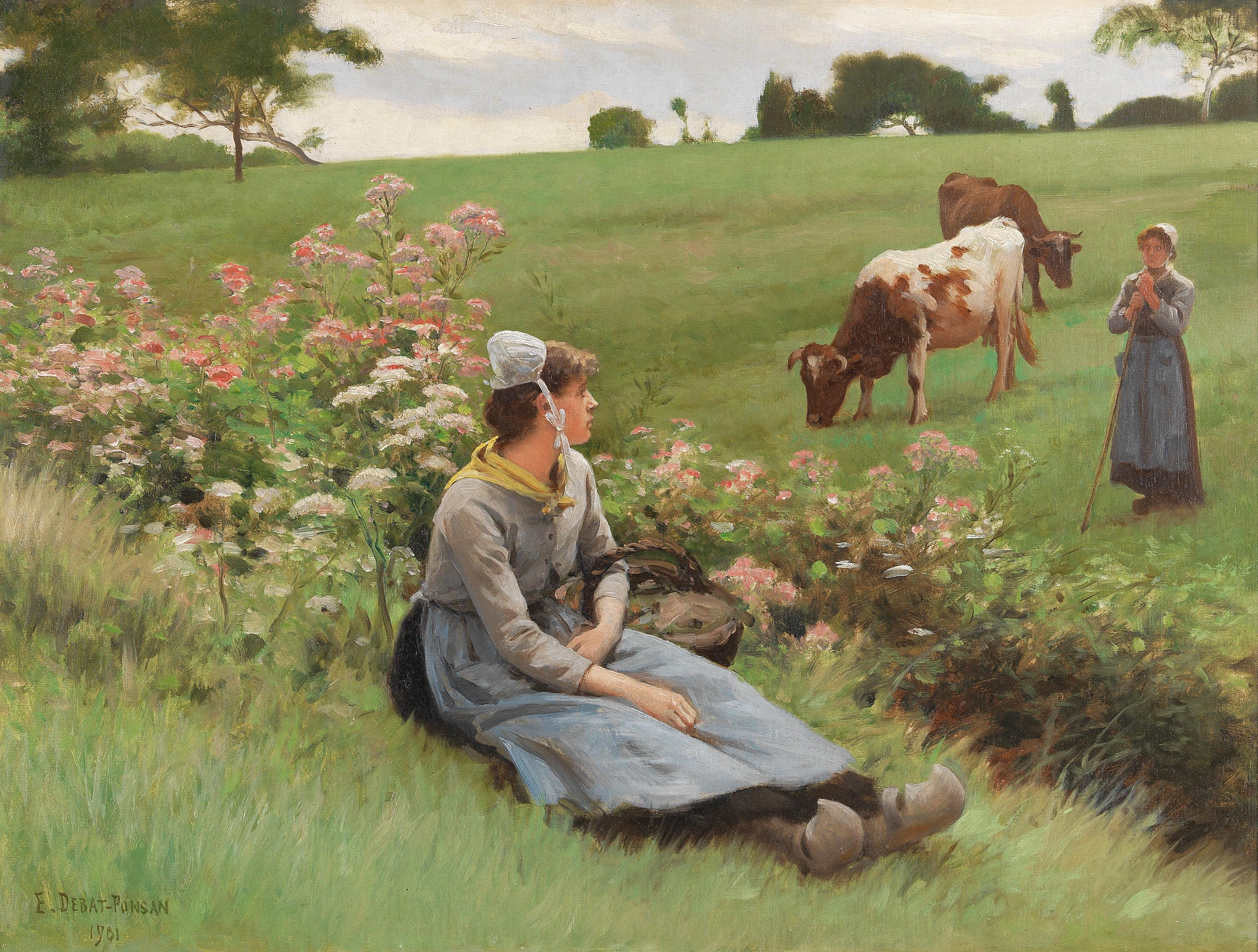
Resting in the Field, 1901

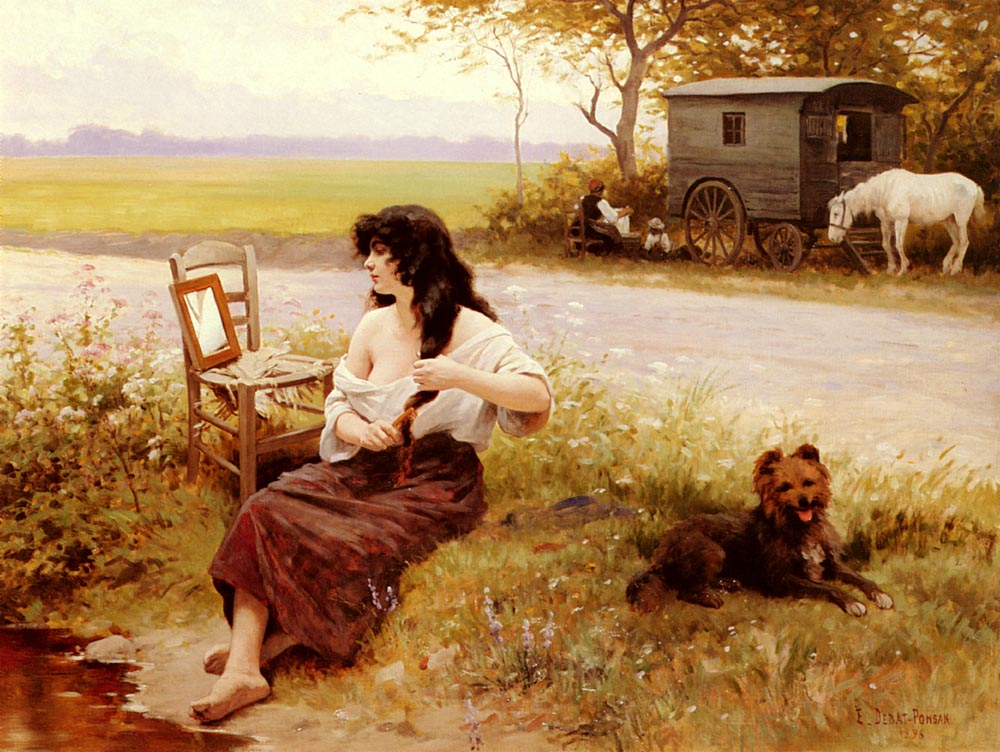
La gitane a la toilette

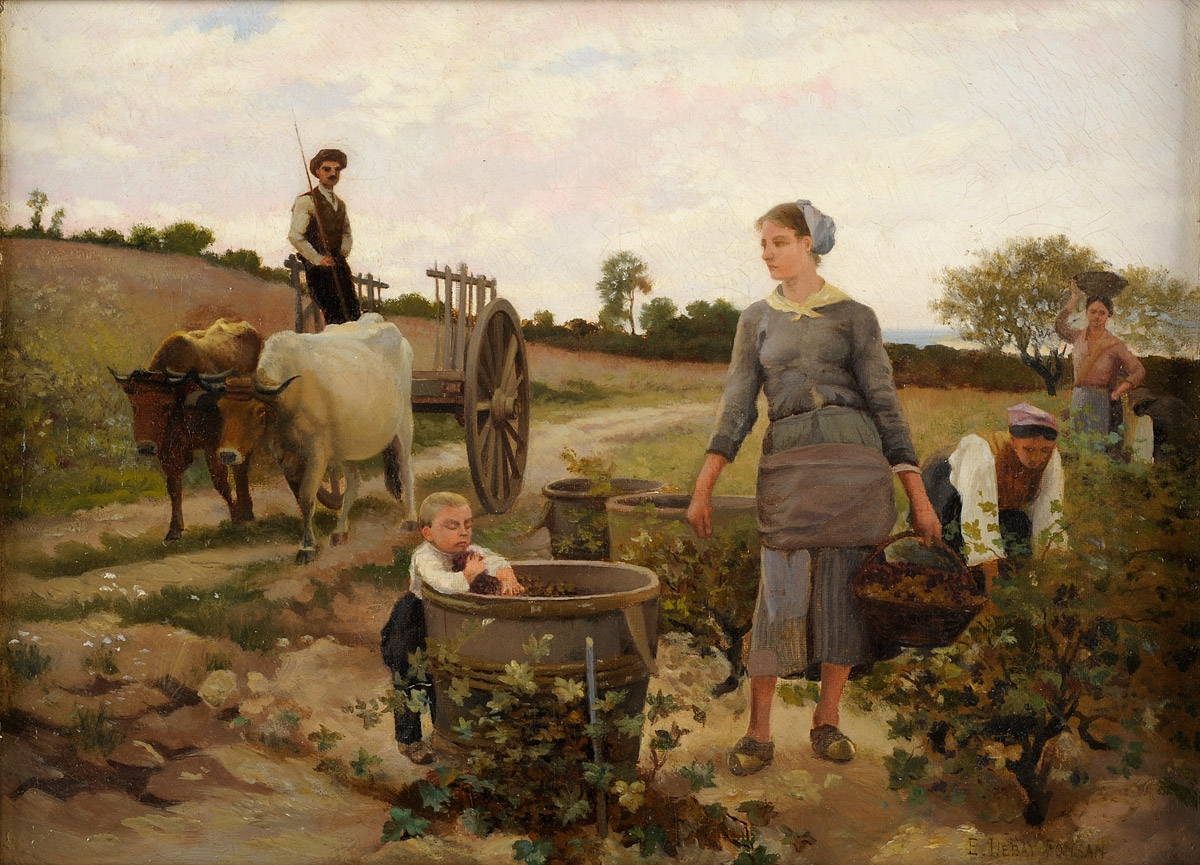
The grape harvest

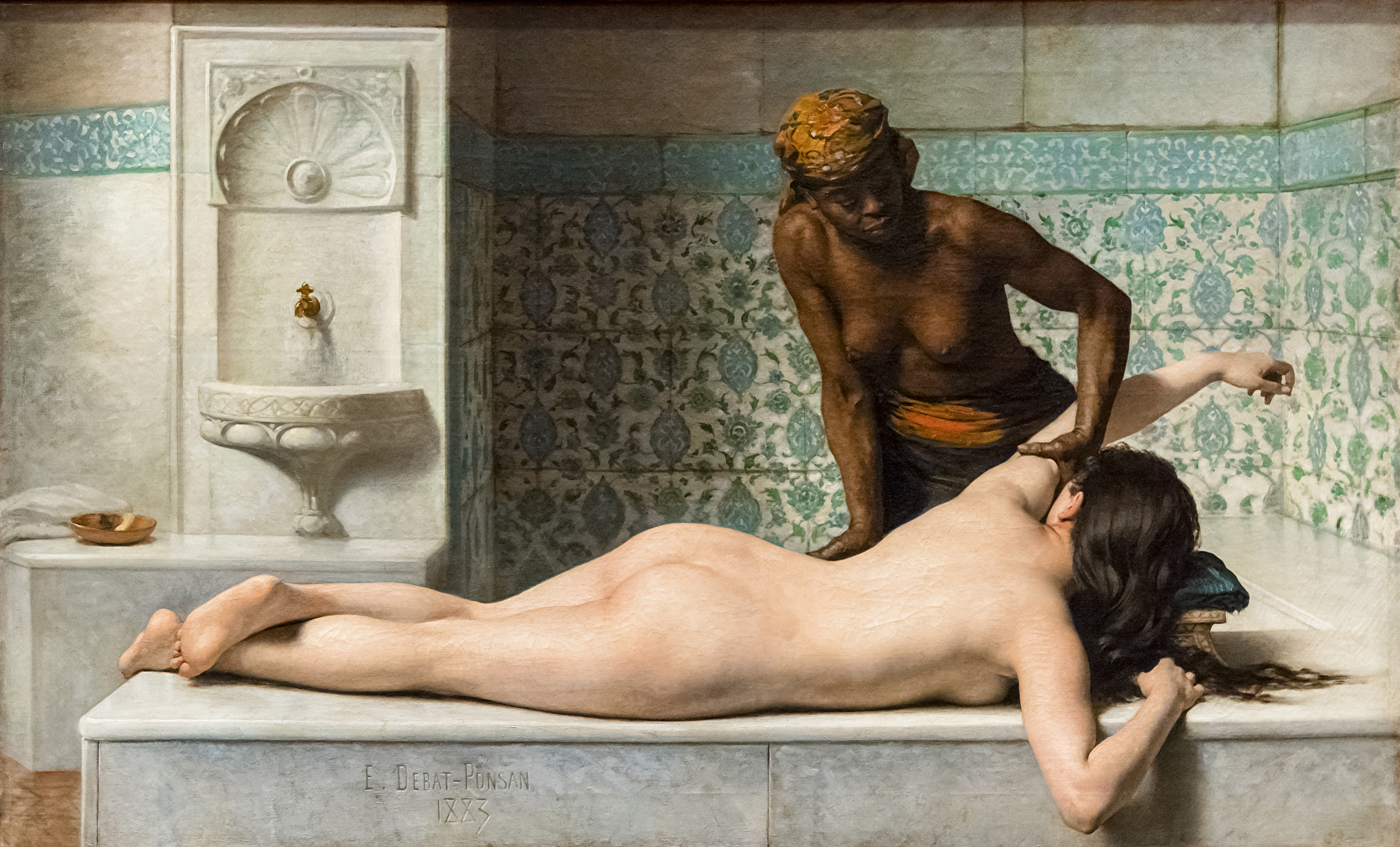
Massage at the Hammam, 1883

Select list of paintings

- Le récit de Philetas c. 1870 (now lost)
- La Captivité des Juifs à Babylone (now lost)
- Daniel Dans la fosse aux lions (Cathedral of Mirande)
- Au sortir de la carrière, c. 1870 (Toulouse, collection)
- Panorama de la bataille de Montretout, 1881 (in collaboration with Jules-Arsène Garnier and Henry-Eugène Delacroix)
- Panorama de Constantinople, 1883 (in collaboration with Jules-Arsène Garnier and Henry-Eugène Delacroix)
- Massage: Scène de Hammam , 1883 (Toulouse, Musée des Augustins)
- Coin de vigne, 1886 (Nantes, Musée des Beaux-Arts)
- La Gitane à la toilette, 1896
- La Vérité sortant du puits, 1898 (Amboise, Musée Hôtel Morin).

== See also ==
- List of Orientalist artists
- Orientalism
