= Florence Hervé =

French–German writer and feminist (born 1944)

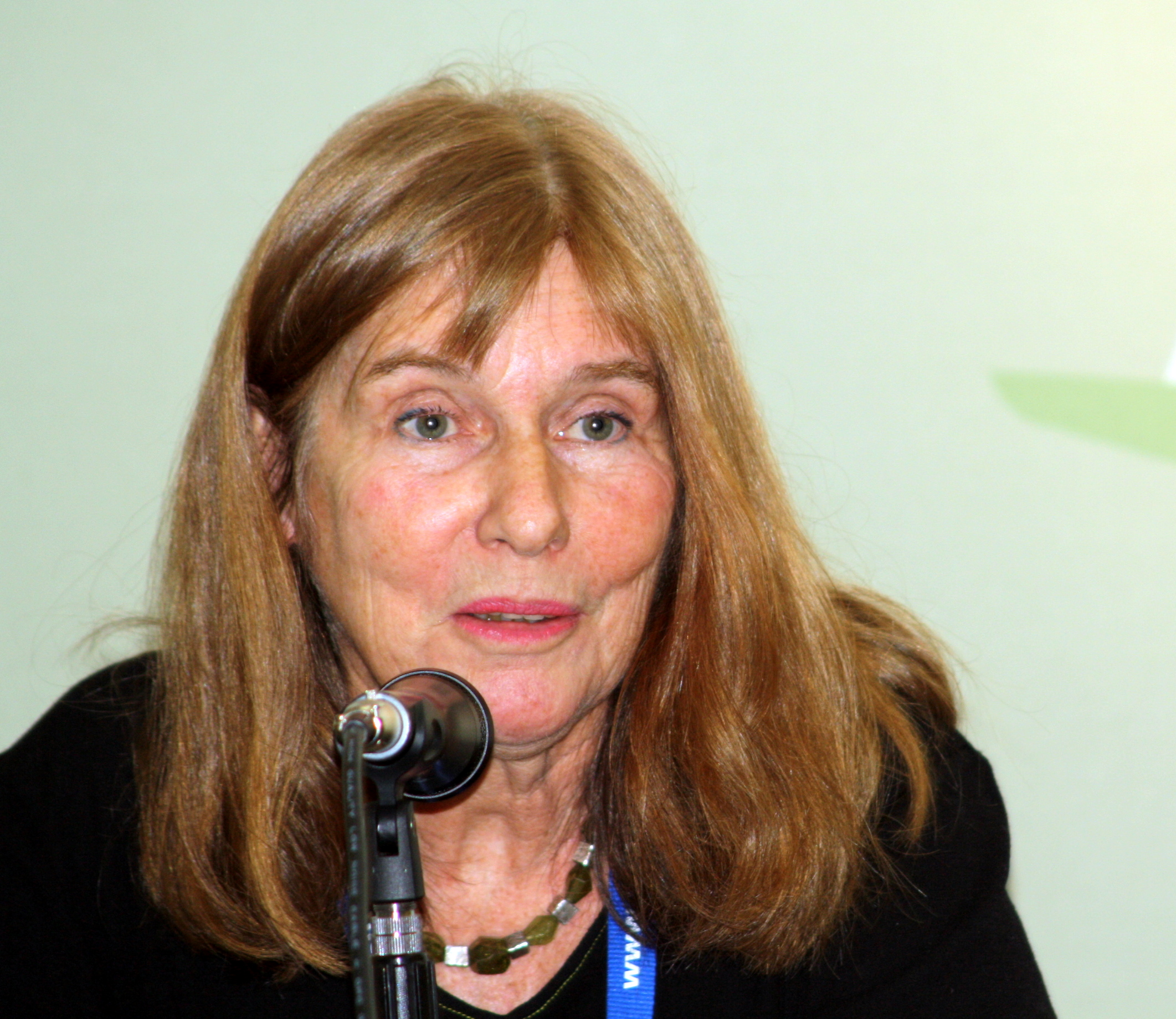
Florence Hervé... at the Leipzig Book Fair, 2010

Florence Hervé (born 17 April 1944) is a Franco-German journalist, historian and feminist activist. In the words of one commentator, she "moves in a space between scholarship and journalism". Since 1993 she has also appeared regularly on broadcast media.

In 2014, the German government wanted to award her the "Bundesverdienstkreuz". She rejected the state decoration, explaining in an open letter to the then President of Germany Joachim Gauck that although the honour came in recognition of her many years of unpaid work on women's issues and policies, along with Franco-German co-operation and international co-operation more generally, her work had frequently placed her in direct opposition to whichever one of a succession of German governments was in power at the time.

== Biography ==
A short extract from Hervé's lengthy explanation for her rejection of a Bundesverdienstkreuz (government honour) in 2014:

- "The policy and historical understanding of the German Federal government continue to be characterised by an insufficient appraisal and appreciation of the Nazi past, an inconsistent fight against latent and open neonazism and racism, and an inadequate recognition of the antifascist resistance - with the exceptions of the 20 July plot and the White Rose group. If I were to accept the honour I would fnd myself lined up with former Nazis and people who carried out Nazi policies. As far as I know, with just one exception, no one has ever had a Bundesverdienstkreuz revoked. That, incidentally, would be an easy thing to do, and something which would contribute to a [necessary] historical re-evaluation."
- "Eine unzureichende Aufarbeitung der Nazivergangenheit, eine nicht konsequente Bekämpfung des offenen und latenten Neonazismus und Rassismus und eine unzureichende Anerkennung des antifaschistischen Widerstands – über den 20. Juli 1944 und die Weiße Rose hinaus – kennzeichnen leider weiterhin die Politik und das Geschichtsverständnis der Bundesrepublik. Würde ich die Auszeichnung annehmen, befände ich mich zudem in einer Reihe mit solchen früheren Preisträgern, die Nazis bzw. Nazitäter waren. Soweit mir bekannt ist, wurde bis auf eine Ausnahme keinem von ihnen nachträglich das Verdienstkreuz aberkannt. Das wäre im übrigen ein leicht machbares Unterfangen, das zudem der Geschichtsaufarbeitung diente."

Florence Hervé was born at Boulogne-sur-Seine, a western suburb of Paris dominated by the automobile industry. (Note: The vast (by the standards of the time) Renault plant was located on the nearby Île Seguin in the middle of the River Seine. At the time of her birth the car plant still operated under the direction of Prince Wilhelm von Urach, a francophile engineer-aristocrat from Stuttgart.) She grew up in a conservative but relatively open-minded family in the suburb of Ville-d'Avray, a short distance to the west of Boulogne. Passing her Abitur (school final exams) in 1961 opened the way to university-level education. She studied Germanistics at Bonn, Heidelberg and Paris, where she received her doctorate. Along the way, she had also, in 1963, received a degree as a translator from the Dolmetsch Institute (specialising in simultaneous translation) at the University of Heidelberg.

Hervé has worked as a freelance journalist since 1969. She has contributed to mainly left-of-center publications, including Réforme, Deutsche Volkszeitung, Frankfurter Rundschau, Kölner Stadt-Anzeiger and Junge Welt. She also became involved in various feminist organisations and initiatives. In the mid-1970s she was a co-founder with Alma Kettig of the Democratic Women's Initiative ("Demokratische Fraueninitiative"). She is a co-producer of the feminist quarterly journal Wir Frauen and of the publication's calendar, produced since 1979. Since 1975 she has also engaged in the feminist movement across Europe and internationally as a member of the leadership team in the Women's International Democratic Federation between 1994 and 2002, and between 1996 and 2004 in the feminist "Freedom for Leyla Zana" initiative.

Issues on which her work as an author and editor focuses include confrontation with fascism and colonialism, the history of anti-fascist resistance and the conditions of women in the global south and north.

In 2014, in her very public rejection of a government proposal to award he the government wanted to award her the "Bundesverdienstkreuz", she stated that she had no wish to give the impression that she had made her political peace with the ruling establishment.

== Personal ==
Florence Hervé has two grown-up daughters as a result of her brief marriage.

== Publications (selection) ==
Monographs
- Studentinnen in der BRD. Eine soziologische Untersuchung (Kleine Bibliothek. vol. 33). Pahl-Rugenstein, Köln 1973, ISBN 3-7609-0079-8.
- with Marianne Konze: Frauen kontra Männer, Sackgasse oder Ausweg? (Marxismus aktuell. vol. 110). Marxistische Blätter, Frankfurt am Main 1977, ISBN 3-88012-484-1.
- with Renate Wisbar: Leben, frei und in Frieden. Frauen gegen Faschismus und Krieg. Röderberg, Frankfurt am Main 1981, ISBN 3-87682-741-8.
- Oradour. Regards au-delà de l'oubli / Blicke gegen das Vergessen. illustrated by Martin Graf. Klartext, Essen 1995, ISBN 3-88474-265-5.
- with Ingeborg Nödinger: Lexikon der Rebellinnen. Von A–Z. Econ List, München 1999, ISBN 3-612-26657-8 (EA Dortmund 1996)
- „Wir fühlten uns frei“. Deutsche und französische Frauen im Widerstand. Klartext, Essen 1997, ISBN 3-88474-536-0.
- with Brigitte Mantilleri: Schweiz. Frauengeschichten, Frauengesichter. edition ebersbach, Dortmund 1998, ISBN 3-931782-26-3.
- Bretagne. Frauengeschichten, Frauengesichter. illustrated by Martin Graf. edition ebersbach, Dortmund 1998, ISBN 3-931782-18-2.
- with Hans Adamo: Natzweiler Struthof. Regards au-delà de l'oubli / Blicke gegen das Vergessen. illustrated by Martin Graf. Klartext, Essen 2002, ISBN 3-89861-092-6.
- with Rainer Höltschl: Absolute Simone de Beauvoir. Mit einem biogr. Essay. Orange Press. Freiburg i. Br. 2003, ISBN 3-936086-09-5.
- Elsass. Frauengeschichten, Frauengesichter. illustrated by Martin Graf. trafo, Berlin 2003, ISBN 3-89626-423-0.
- Frauen und das Meer. illustrated by Katharina Mayer. Gerstenberg, Hildesheim 2004, ISBN 3-8067-2913-1.
- with Renate Wurms: Das Weiberlexikon. Von Abenteuer bis Zyklus. 5th edition. PapyRossa, Köln (ISBN 3-89438-047-0) 2006, ISBN 3-89438-333-X (EA 1985 unter dem Titel: Kleines Weiberlexikon)
- Frauen und Berge. illustrated by Katharina Mayer. Modo, Freiburg i. Br. 2006, ISBN 3-937014-47-0.
- Clara Zetkin oder: Dort kämpfen, wo das Leben ist. Dietz, Berlin 2007, ISBN 978-3-320-02096-5 (For the Rosa Luxemburg Foundation)
- Frauen der Wüste. AvivA, Berlin 2011, ISBN 978-3-932338-46-5.

Essays

- Die „Oradour-Lüge“. Blick nach vorne; Versuch einer Zwischenbilanz. In: Augenblick. Berichte, Informationen und Dokumente der Mahn- und Gedenkstätte Düsseldorf. vols. 8/9, 1995, ISSN 1434-3606, pp. 27–28.
- Vor-Worte. In: Nikolaus Gatter (Hrsg.): Wenn die Geschichte um die Ecke geht (Almanach der Varnhagen-Gesellschaft. Band 1). Spitz, Berlin 2000, ISBN 3-8305-0025-4, pp. 105–108.
- Louise Ottos „Frauen-Zeitung“ in historischer und aktueller Sicht. Was ist an der „Frauen-Zeitung“ für uns von Interesse. In: Louise-Otto-Peters-Jahrbuch. vol. 1, 2004, pp. 85–94.
- Seit bald 25 Jahren erscheint die Zeitschrift „Wir Frauen“. In: Wer schreibt, der bleibt. Die neue Frauenbewegung. vol. 28, Heft 66/67, 2005, pp. 221–227.
- Vilipendée à l'ouest, encensée à l'st? Autour de la réception de Clara Zetkin à l'occasion de son 150e anniversaire. In: Allemagne d'aujourd'hui. 2007, ISSN 0002-5712, pp. 148–152.

Translations from French into German

- Marie de Gournay: Zur Gleichheit von Frauen und Männern (Philosophinnen. vol. 6). Ein-Fach, Aachen 1997.
- Gilbert Badia: Clara Zetkin. Eine neue Biographie. Dietz, Berlin 1994, ISBN 3-320-01834-5.
