= Marin de Viry =

French writer and literary critic (born 1962)

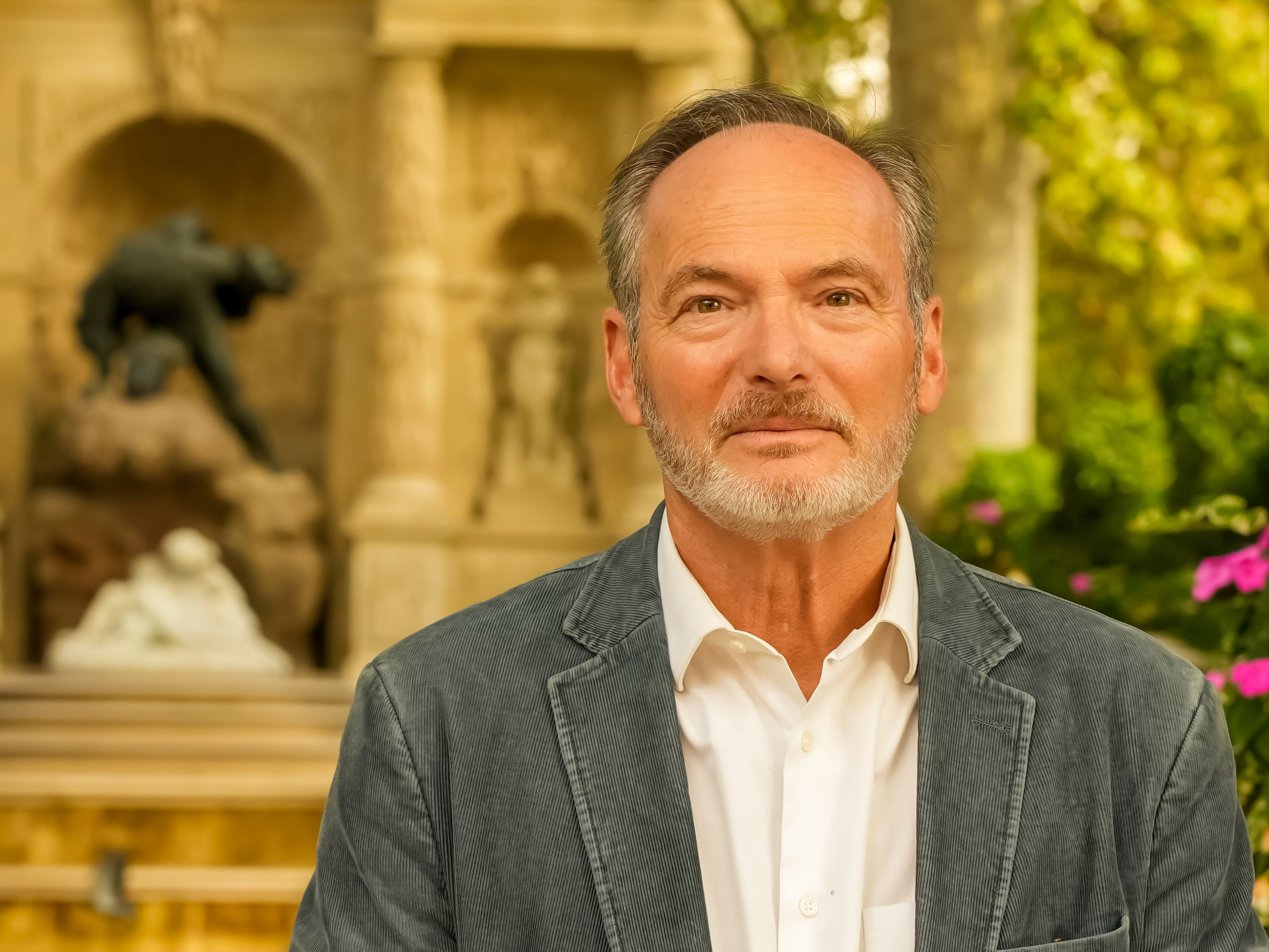
Marin de Viry

Marin de Viry (born 30 January 1962, Boulogne-Billancourt) is a French writer and literary critic. A member of the management committee of the Revue des deux Mondes, he is also a professor at Sciences Po in Paris and was Dominique de Villepin's Communication advisor during his campaign for the 2012 French presidential election

== Bibliography ==
- 1996: Pour en finir avec les hebdomadaires. Pour en finir avec... (in French). Paris: Éditions Gallimard. 1996. pp. 139. ISBN 2-07-074101X..
- 2008: Le Matin des abrutis (in French). Paris: JC Lattès. p. 205. ISBN 978-2-7096-3014-6..
- 2010: Tous touristes. Café Voltaire (in French). Paris: Flammarion. p. 124. ISBN 978-2-08-123193-1..
- 2012: Mémoires d'un snobé (in French). Paris: Pierre-Guillaume de Roux. p. 205. ISBN 978-2-36371-021-5..
