= Hôtel de Ville, Boulogne-Billancourt =

Town hall in Boulogne-Billancourt, France

Hôtel de Ville
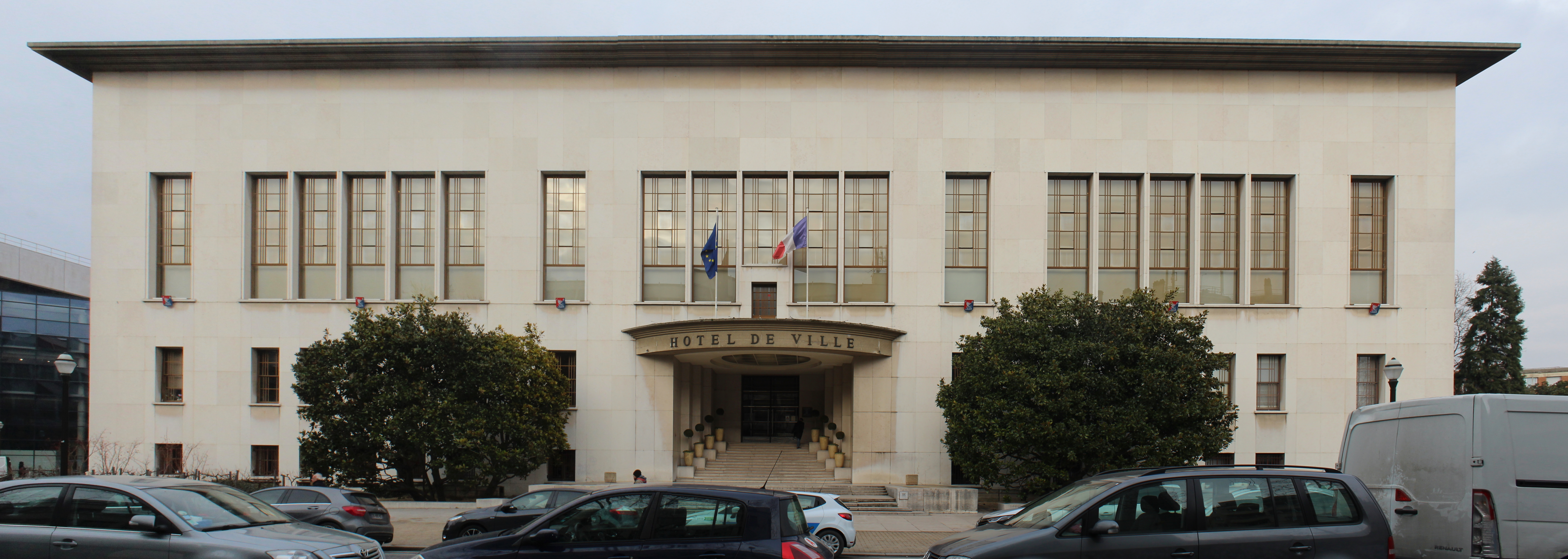
- The main frontage of the Hôtel de Ville in March 2018

General information
- Type: City hall
- Architectural style: Art Deco style
- Location: Boulogne-Billancourt, France
- Coordinates: 48.8360°N 2.2405°E
- Completed: 1934

Design and construction
- Architects: Tony Garnier and Jacques Debat-Ponsan

Monument historique
- Official name: Hôtel de ville
- Type: Inscrit
- Designated: 1975
- Reference no.: PA00088077

The Hôtel de Ville (French pronunciation: [otɛl də vil], City Hall) is a municipal building in Boulogne-Billancourt, Hauts-de-Seine, in the western suburbs of Paris, France standing on Avenue André Morizet. It was designated a monument historique by the French government in 1975.

== History ==
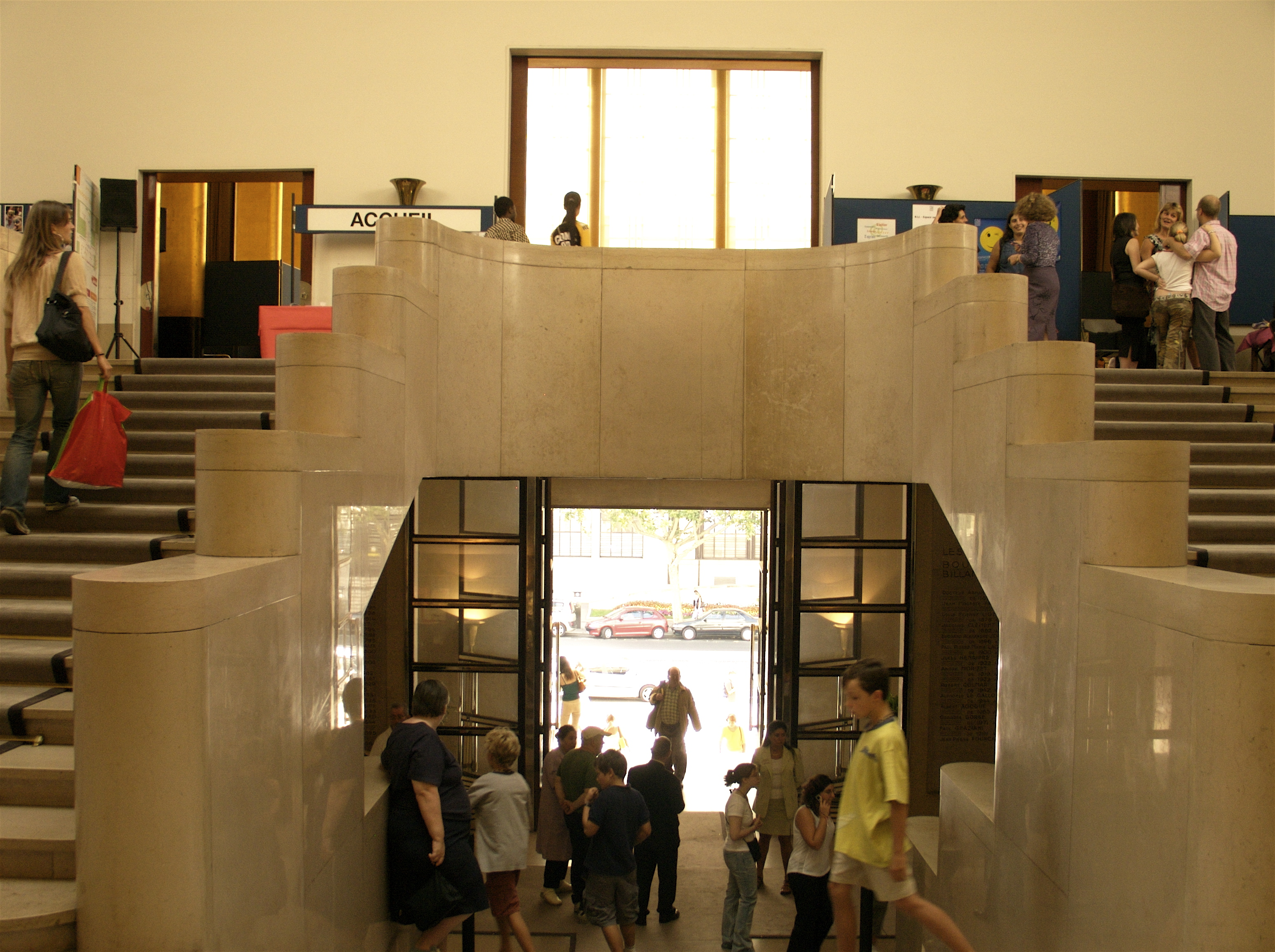
The Grand Staircase

Following the French Revolution, the new town council established offices in the clergy house attached to the Église Notre-Dame-des-Menus. After occupying accommodation at No. 35 Grande-Rue (now Avenue Jean-Baptiste-Clément) from 1813, the council returned to the clergy house in 1825. The council relocated to an 18th-century building belonging to Baroness Daumont on the corner of Rue de Montmorency and Rue de Buzenval (now Rue Anna Jacquin) in 1845, and then moved again to a new building erected at the former estate of Sieur de Guaïta on Rue de Billancourt (now Place de Léon-Blum) in 1880.

In the late 1920s, the town council, led by the mayor, André Morizet, decided to commission a more substantial town hall in the centre of the Boulogne-Billancourt conurbation. The site they selected was a former quarry at the corner of Rue Gallieni and Rue Paul-Bert. Construction of the new building started in December 1931. It was designed by Tony Garnier and Jacques Debat-Ponsan in the Art Deco style, built in reinforced concrete and was officially opened by Morizet on 15 December 1934.

The layout involved two rectangular blocks with the rear block taller and wider than the front block. The design of the front block involved a symmetrical main frontage of 19 bays facing onto the main road (now Avenue André Morizet). The central bay featured a short flight of steps leading up to a heavily recessed doorway with a curved canopy. The building was fenestrated with bipartite casement windows on the ground floor, placed one above the other, and tall casement windows on the first floor, spaced out in three blocks of five with single windows between. At roof level, there were prominent eaves. Internally the principal room was the Grand Hall des Guichets (the large ticket hall), which was 65 meters (213 ft) long and 28 metres (92 ft) wide, and was accommodated in the rear block. Works of art commissioned for building included two pieces by the sculptor, Paul Cornet, entitled Seated Woman (created 1930) and Venus and Cupid (created 1941).

During the Second World War, elements of the French Resistance, led by Alphonse Le Gallo, seized the town hall five days in advance of the official liberation of the town by the French 2nd Armoured Division, commanded by General Philippe Leclerc, on 26 August 1944.
