= Groupe Scolaire Maïmonide Rambam =

Private, Jewish school in Boulogne-Billancourt, France

Coordinates: 48.8430°N 2.2288°E

Address
- 11 Rue des Abondances; 92100 Boulogne-Billancourt; France

Information
- Type: Private, Jewish
- Established: 1935
- Website: maimonide.fr

Groupe Scolaire Maïmonide Rambam, named for the medieval philosopher Maimonides, is a Jewish private school in Boulogne-Billancourt, France, in the Paris metropolitan area. It serves levels maternelle (preschool) until lycée (senior high school).

It was established as Ecole Maïmonide in 1935. In 1939 it closed as a result of World War II but reopened in 1944 after the Nazi-established ban on Jewish institutions was lifted.
