= Canton of Boulogne-Billancourt-2 =

Administrative division of Hauts-de-Seine, France

Coordinates: 48.83°N 2.24°E

The canton of Boulogne-Billancourt-2 is an administrative division of the Hauts-de-Seine department, in northern France. It was created at the French canton reorganisation which came into effect in March 2015. Its seat is in Boulogne-Billancourt.

It consists of the following communes:

1. Boulogne-Billancourt (partly)
2. Sèvres
