= Driencourt =

- Commune
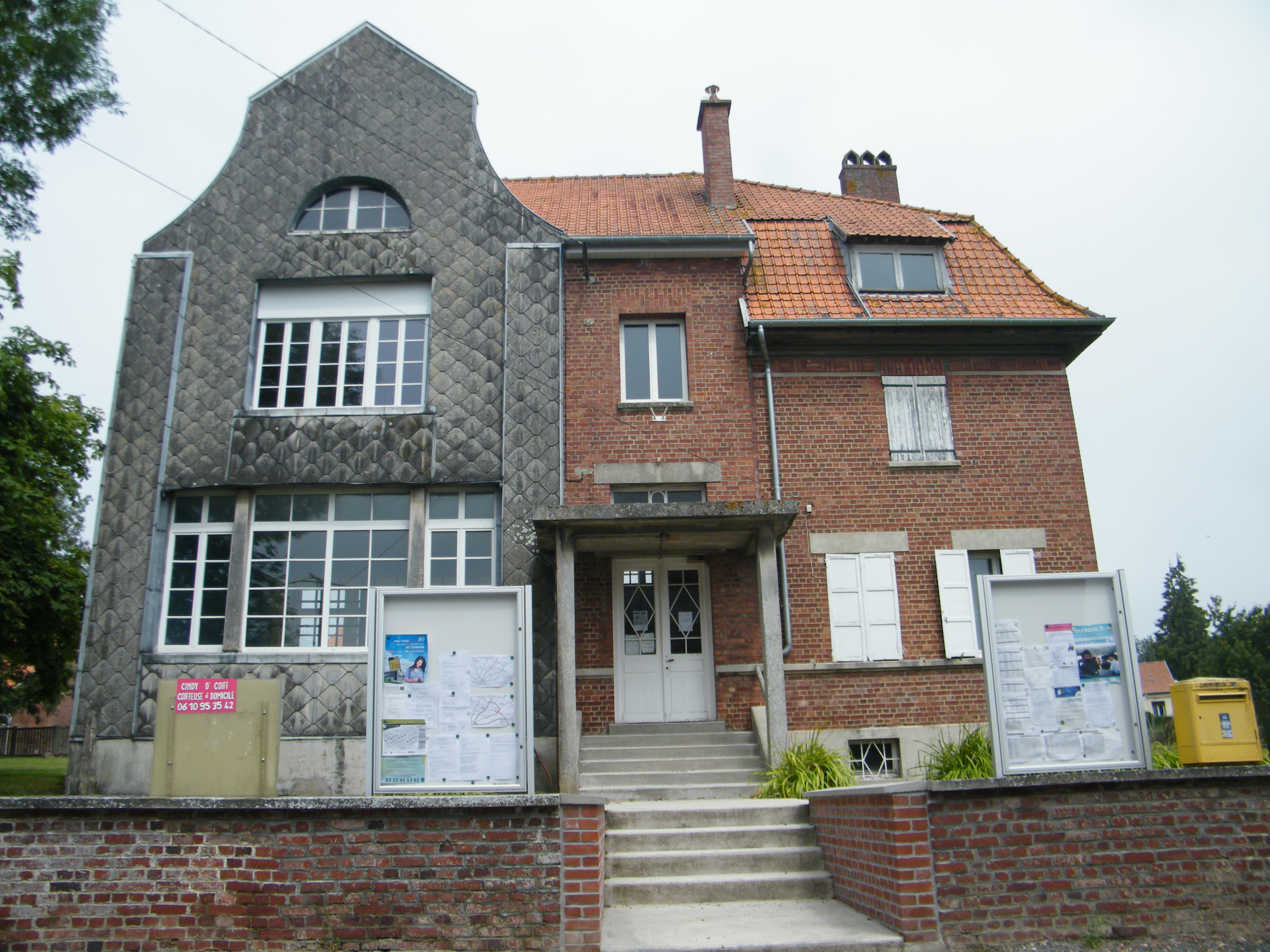
- The town hall and school in Driencourt
- Location of Driencourt
- Location within France Location within Hauts-de-France
- Coordinates: 49°57′33″N 3°00′38″E
- Country: France
- Region: Hauts-de-France
- Department: Somme
- Arrondissement: Péronne
- Canton: Péronne
- Intercommunality: Haute Somme

Government
  - Mayor (2022–2026): Katy Ondicana Gomez
- Area^{1}: 5 km^{2} (1.9 sq mi)
- Elevation: 40 m (130 ft)
- Highest elevation: 139 m (456 ft)
- Lowest elevation: 65 m (213 ft)
- Population (2023): 78
  - Density: 16/km^{2} (40/sq mi)
- Time zone: UTC+01:00 (CET)
  - Summer (DST): UTC+02:00 (CEST)
- INSEE/Postal code: 80258 /80240
- ^{1} French Land Register data, which excludes lakes, ponds, glaciers > 1 km^{2} (0.386 sq mi or 247 acres) and river estuaries.

Driencourt (French pronunciation: [dʁijɛ̃kuʁ]; Picard: Dryincourt ) is a commune in the Somme department in Hauts-de-France in northern France.

== Geography ==
Driencourt is situated on the D181 road, some 15 miles (24 km) northwest of Saint-Quentin.

== Population ==
Historical population
Year	Pop.	±% p.a.
1968	119	—
1975	97	−2.88%
1982	88	−1.38%
1990	78	−1.50%
1999	85	+0.96%
2007	88	+0.43%
2012	98	+2.18%
2017	92	−1.26%
2023	78	−2.71%
Source: INSEE

== History ==
As with many towns in this part of France, World War I saw the place reduced to rubble. A Parisian architect, Jacques Debat-Ponsan, was employed to design and reconstruct the town's public buildings.

- Reconstruction of the school and Mayor's office – accomplished in 1927
- Reconstruction of the church achieved in 1920
- Other reconstructions. A certain number of homes, judging by their style, were rebuilt by the same architect.

== See also ==
- Communes of the Somme department
