= Boulogne-Billancourt =

- Subprefecture and commune
- La Seine Musicale on Île Seguin in the Seine

- Coat of arms

- Location (in red) within Paris inner suburbs
- Location of Boulogne-Billancourt
- Location within France Location within Île-de-France (region)
- Coordinates: 48°50′07″N 2°14′27″E
- Country: France
- Region: Île-de-France
- Department: Hauts-de-Seine
- Arrondissement: Boulogne-Billancourt
- Canton: Boulogne-Billancourt-1 and 2
- Intercommunality: Grand Paris

Government
  - Mayor (2026–32): Pierre-Christophe Baguet (LR)
- Area^{1}: 6.17 km^{2} (2.38 sq mi)
- Highest elevation: 40 m (130 ft)
- Lowest elevation: 28 m (92 ft)
- Population (2023): 119,019
  - Density: 19,300/km^{2} (50,000/sq mi)
- Demonym: Boulonnais
- Time zone: UTC+01:00 (CET)
  - Summer (DST): UTC+02:00 (CEST)
- INSEE/Postal code: 92012 /92100
- ^{1} French Land Register data, which excludes lakes, ponds, glaciers > 1 km^{2} (0.386 sq mi or 247 acres) and river estuaries.

Boulogne-Billancourt (French: [bulɔɲ bijɑ̃kuʁ]; often colloquially simply Boulogne, until 1924 officially Boulogne-sur-Seine, [bulɔɲ syʁ sɛn], lit. 'Boulogne-on-Seine') is a commune in the western inner suburbs of Paris, France, located 8.2 km (5 mi) from the centre of Paris at Notre Dame. It is a subprefecture of the Hauts-de-Seine department and thus the seat of the larger arrondissement of Boulogne-Billancourt. It is also part of the Métropole du Grand Paris. Boulogne-Billancourt includes one island in the Seine: Île Seguin.

Boulogne-Billancourt is one of the wealthiest regions in the Parisian area and in France. Formerly an important industrial site, it has successfully reconverted into business services and is now home to major communication companies headquartered in the Val de Seine business district.

== Etymology ==
The original name of the commune was Boulogne-sur-Seine (meaning "Boulogne upon Seine").

Before the 14th century, Boulogne was a small village called Menuls-lès-Saint-Cloud (meaning "Menuls near Saint-Cloud"). In the beginning of the 14th century, King Philip IV of France ordered the building in Menuls-lès-Saint-Cloud of a church dedicated to the virgin of the sanctuary of Boulogne-sur-Mer, then a famous pilgrimage centre in northern France. The church, meant to become a pilgrimage centre closer to Paris than the distant city of Boulogne-sur-Mer, was named Notre-Dame de Boulogne la Petite ("Our Lady of Boulogne the Minor"). Gradually, the village of Menuls-lès-Saint-Cloud became known as Boulogne-la-Petite, and later as Boulogne-sur-Seine.

In 1924, Boulogne-sur-Seine was officially renamed Boulogne-Billancourt to reflect the development of the industrial neighbourhood of Billancourt annexed in 1860.

As for the name Billancourt, it was recorded for the first time in 1150 as Bullencort, sometimes also spelled Bollencort. It comes from Medieval Latin cortem, accusative of cors, meaning "enclosure", "estate", suffixed to the Germanic patronym Buolo (meaning "friend, brother, kinsman"), thus having the meaning of "estate of Buolo".

== History ==
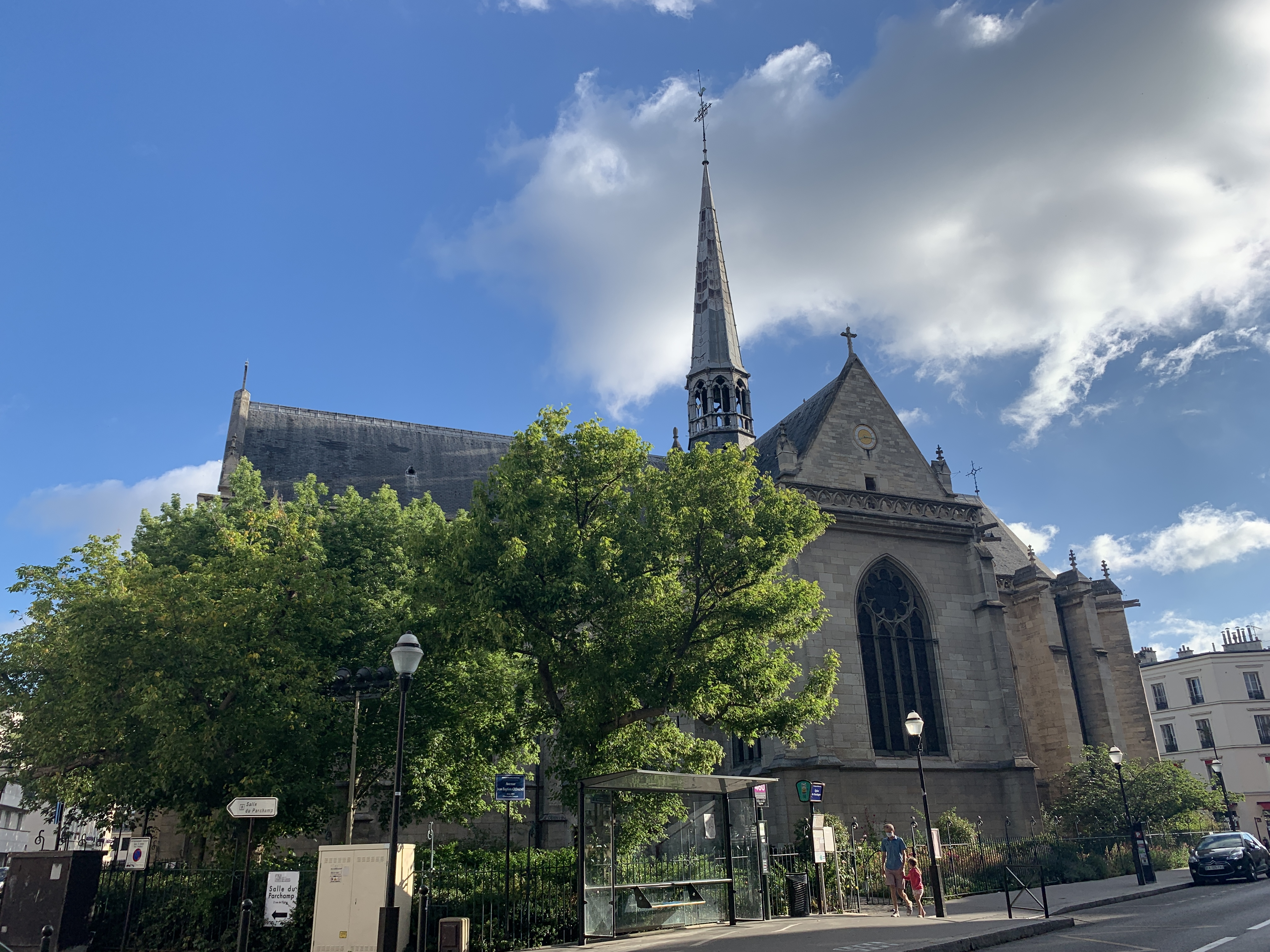
Basilica of Our Lady of Boulogne

In 1860, the city of Paris absorbed the territory of the former communes that were located inside the Thiers fortifications. On that occasion, the communes of Auteuil and Passy were disbanded and divided between Boulogne-Billancourt (then called Boulogne-sur-Seine) and the city of Paris. Boulogne-sur-Seine received a small part of the territory of Passy, and about half of the territory of Auteuil (including the area of Billancourt, which belonged to the disbanded commune of Auteuil).

Some of the competitive shooting events of the 1900 Summer Olympics took place in Boulogne-Billancourt.

In 1929, the Bois de Boulogne, which was hitherto divided between the communes of Boulogne-Billancourt and Neuilly-sur-Seine, was annexed in its entirety by the city of Paris. On that occasion, Boulogne-Billancourt, to which most of the Bois de Boulogne belonged, lost about half of its territory. Since then, Boulogne-Billancourt has been surrounded to the west, south and east by the Seine and to the north and north-east by the 16th arrondissement of Paris.

Boulogne-Billancourt is known for being the birthplace of three major French industries. It was the location, in 1906 for the very first aircraft factory, that of Appareils d'Aviation Les Frères Voisin, which was then followed by those of many other aviation pioneers, and the tradition continues with several aviation related companies still operating in the area. In the mid 20th century, the company SNCAC had a manufacturing facility in Boulogne-Billancourt that was damaged by Allied bombing on 3 March 1942.

The automobile industry had a large presence with Renault on Île Seguin, as well as Salmson building both cars and aircraft engines. Finally, the French film industry started here and, from 1922 to 1992 it was the home of the Billancourt Studios, and since becoming a major location for French film production. It was used as the setting of the TV show Code Lyoko.

== Demographics ==
Historical population

Year	Pop.	±% p.a.
1793	3,600	—
1800	2,481	−5.18%
1806	2,378	−0.70%
1821	3,266	+2.14%
1831	5,323	+5.01%
1836	5,993	+2.40%
1841	6,906	+2.88%
1846	7,847	+2.59%
1851	7,602	−0.63%
1856	11,378	+8.40%
1861	13,944	+4.15%
1866	17,343	+4.46%
1872	18,965	+1.50%
1876	21,556	+3.25%
1881	25,825	+3.68%
1886	30,084	+3.10%
1891	32,569	+1.60%
1896	37,418	+2.81%
1901	44,416	+3.49%

Year	Pop.	±% p.a.
1906	49,969	+2.38%
1911	57,027	+2.68%
1921	68,008	+1.78%
1926	75,559	+2.13%
1931	86,234	+2.68%
1936	97,379	+2.46%
1946	79,410	−2.02%
1954	93,998	+2.13%
1962	106,641	+1.59%
1968	109,008	+0.37%
1975	103,578	−0.73%
1982	102,582	−0.14%
1990	101,743	−0.10%
1999	106,367	+0.50%
2007	111,045	+0.54%
2012	117,126	+1.07%
2017	120,071	+0.50%
2023	119,019	−0.15%

Source: EHESS and INSEE (1968-2023)

== Urbanism ==
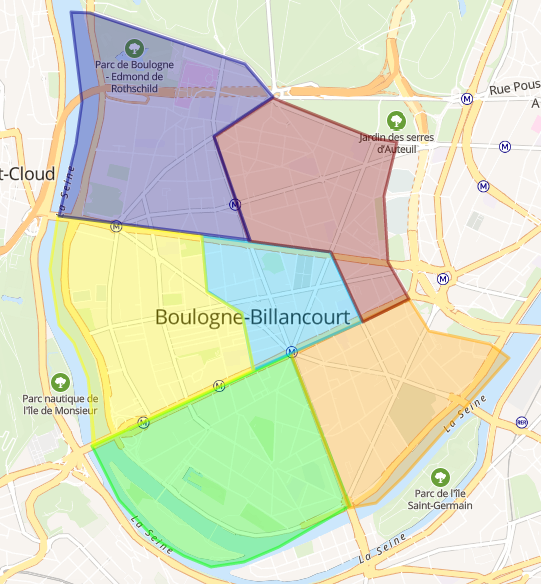
Neighbourhoods in Boulogne-Billancourt: Parchamp – Albert Kahn Les Princes – Marmottan Silly – Galliény Centre-Ville Billancourt – Rives de Seine République – Point du Jour

- The ecologic neighbourhood of the Trapèze in Boulogne-Billancourt: the district stands on 74 hectares and will be able to house up to 18,000 inhabitants at the end of its construction. 65% of the district's energy is brought by geothermal power, which heats and freshens the buildings. Solar panels and a vegetable greenhouse were installed in the aim to link the district to sustainable energies. Bicycle and "soft" travels will of course be put first to reduce the pollution caused by cars, as well as other vehicles which do not run on electricity.
- The Ambroise Paré Hospital is located in the city.

== Administration ==
With the city of Sèvres, Boulogne-Billancourt is part of the communauté d'agglomération Val de Seine.

== Transport ==
Boulogne-Billancourt is served by two stations on Paris Métro Line 10: Boulogne–Jean Jaurès and Boulogne–Pont de Saint-Cloud. It is also served by three stations on Paris Métro Line 9: Marcel Sembat, Billancourt and Pont de Sèvres.

When completed, Paris Métro Line 15 will serve the city via Pont de Sèvres. To coincide with the creation of a new station entrance across from the Seine Musicale, the city built a new footbridge linking the two. The new footbridge was inaugurated on 20 September 2025.

== Politics ==
Boulogne-Billancourt is represented by two constituencies and therefore two Members of Parliament.

Constituency	Member	Party
Hauts-de-Seine's 9th constituency	Elisabeth de Maistre	The Republicans
Hauts-de-Seine's 10th constituency	Gabriel Attal	Renaissance

== Economy ==
Boulogne-Billancourt hosts the global headquarters of several multinational companies, including:

- Alcatel-Lucent
- Boursorama
- Carrefour
- Française des Jeux
- Pika Édition
- Renault
- TF1 (TF1 Tower)
- Vallourec
- Yoplait

Prior to 2000 Schneider Electric's head office was in Boulogne-Billancourt.

== Main sights ==
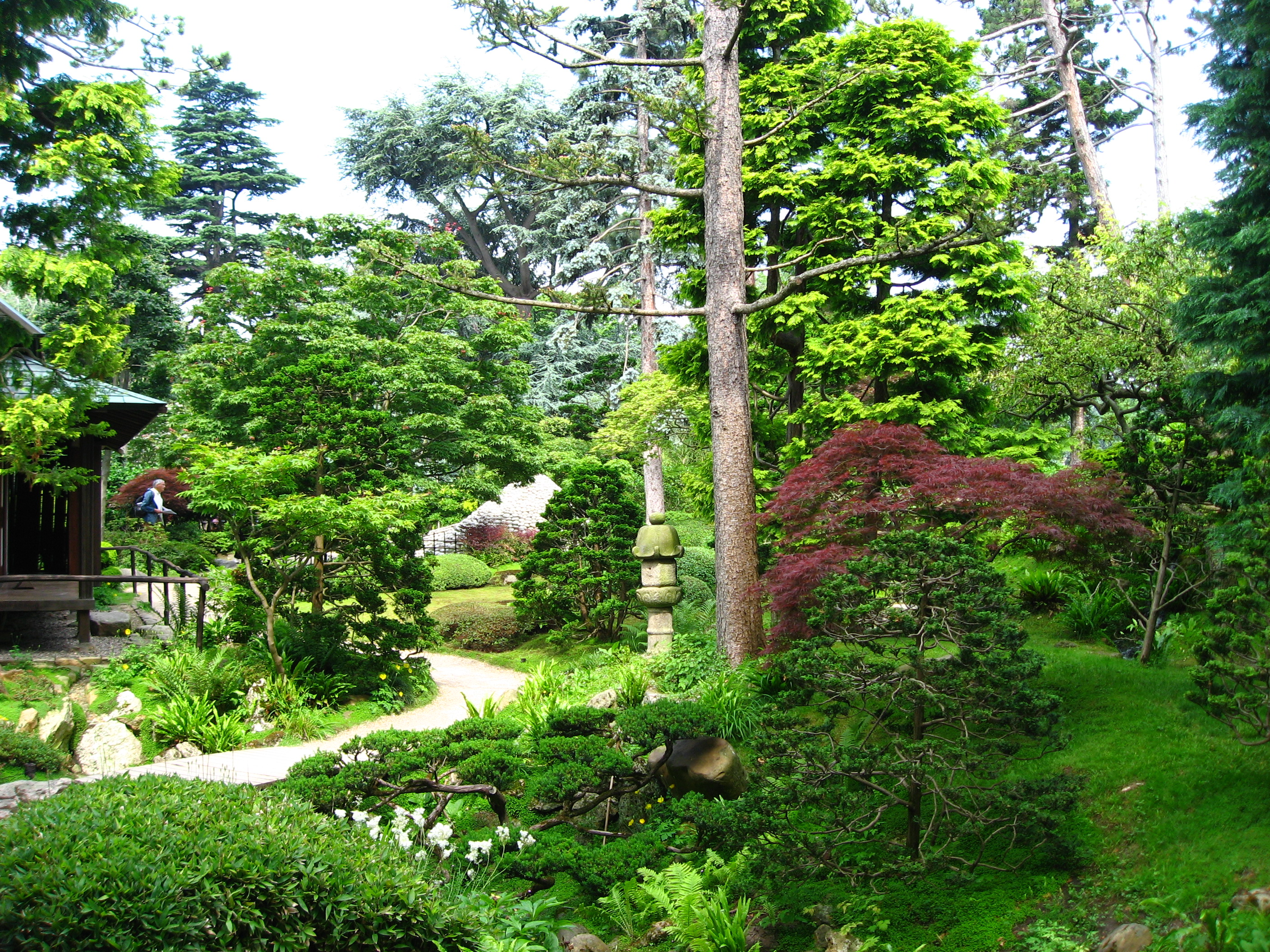
Musée Albert-Kahn

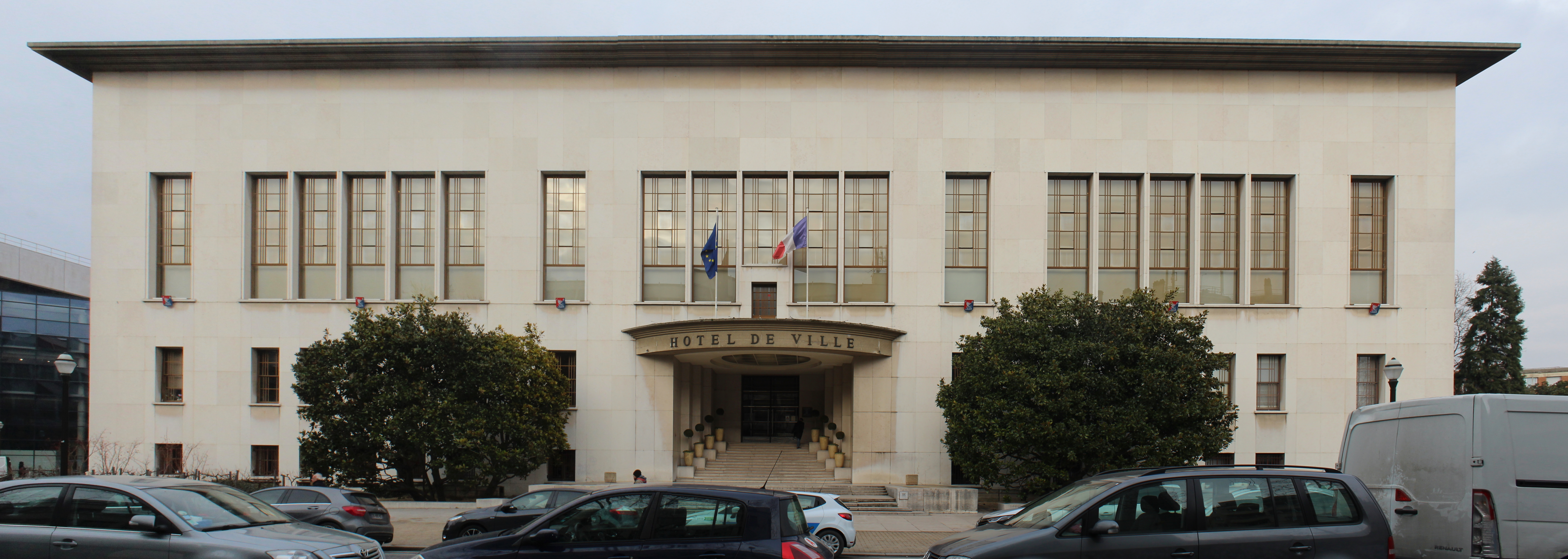
The Hôtel de Ville

- The Musée Albert-Kahn at 14, Rue du Port, Boulogne-Billancourt is a national museum and includes four hectares of gardens, joining landscape scenes of various national traditions. The museum also includes historic photographs and film.
- The Musée des Années Trente is a museum of artistic and industrial objects from the 1930s.
- The Hôtel de Ville was completed in 1934.

== Education ==
The public collèges (middle schools) in the commune include Jacqueline-Auriol, Bartholdi, Paul-Landowski and Jean-Renoir. The public high schools are the Lycée Jacques-Prévert and the Lycée Polyvalent Étienne-Jules-Marey. Prior to the September 1968 opening of Prévert, the first high school/sixth-form in Boulogne, an annex of Lycée La Fontaine served the city.

The private school Groupe Scolaire Maïmonide Rambam covers maternelle through lycée. There is also the private high school Notre-Dame. The latter's performance and ranking in Boulogne-Billancourt are given by its success of baccalaureate rate in different series. According to the ranking of L'Express in 2015, the national rank of Notre-Dame de Boulogne was 170 out of 2301 and 7 out of 52 at department level. The private schools Dupanloup and Saint-Joseph-du-Parchamp serve maternelle through collège. Private maternelle and élémentaire schools include Saint-Alexandre and Saint-François d’Assise. Jardin de Solférino and La Maison de l'Enfant are private maternelles.

The Association Eveil Japon (エベイユ学園 Ebeiyu Gakuen), a supplementary Japanese education programme, is located in Boulogne-Billancourt. A campus of the École supérieure des sciences commerciales d'Angers is also located in the city.

== Notable people ==
Boulogne-Billancourt was the birthplace of:

- Paul Bablot (1873–1923), racing driver
- Pape Badiane (1980–2016), basketball player
- Pierre Bellemare (1929–2018), actor and writer
- Paul Belmondo (born 1963), racing driver
- Pierre Bleuse (born 1977), music conductor
- Bertrand Blier (1939–2025), screenwriter and film director; son of Bernard Blier
- Hubert Le Blon (1874–1910), automobilist and pioneer aviator
- Christophe Boltanski (born 1962), writer and journalist
- Booba (born 1976), rapper
- Daniel Buren (born 1938), conceptual artist
- Guillaume Canet (born 1973), actor, screenwriter and director
- Leslie Caron (born 1931), film actress and dancer
- Benjamin Castaldi (born 1970), TV presenter and producer; son of actor Jean-Pierre Castaldi, former husband of fellow TV presenter Flavie Flament
- Matthieu Chedid (born 1971), composer, singer, guitarist; son of fellow singer and composer Louis Chedid and grandson of writer and poet Andrée Chedid
- Michel Combes (born 1962), French businessman; the current CEO of Alcatel-Lucent
- Guillaume Connesson (born 1970), composer
- Jean-François Copé (born 1964), politician
- Édith Cresson (born 1934), politician, former Prime Minister of France under the presidency of François Mitterrand
- Xavier de Roux (born 1940), politician
- Michel Deville (1931–2023), screenwriter and film director
- Françoise Deslogères (1929-2020), ondist
- Laurent Garnier (born 1966), electronic music producer and DJ
- Anna Gavalda (born 1970), novelist
- Hippolyte Girardot (born 1955), actor
- André Glucksmann (1937–2015), political philosopher and writer
- David Hallyday (born David Smet, 1966), composer, pop rock singer; son of singers Johnny Hallyday (born Jean-Philippe Smet) and Sylvie Vartan, brother of actress Laura Smet, cousin of actor Michael Vartan
- Raphaël Hamburger (born 1981), music supervisor, son of singers Michel Berger (born Michel Hamburger) and France Gall
- Raphaël Haroche (born 1975), singer, songwriter and actor
- Sébastien Akchoté-Bozović, known mononymously as Sebastian (born 1981), electronic music producer and DJ;
- Florence Hervé (born 1944), journalist
- Jacques Huntzinger (born 1943), ambassador
- Henri Kagan (born 1930), chemist
- Jean Keraudy (1920-2001) prison escape artist
- Keny Arkana (born 20 December 1982), Argentinian-French rapper and co-founder of the social movement La Rage du peuple
- Sandrine Kiberlain (born 1968), actress; wife of fellow actor Vincent Lindon
- Louise L. Lambrichs (born 1952), novelist and screenwriter
- Gérard Lanvin (born 1950), actor
- Corinne Lepage (born 1951), politician
- Ferdinand de Lesseps (born 1957), racing driver
- Marc Levy (born 1961), novelist
- Thierry Lhermitte (born 1952), actor, co-writer (usually with the band of the Splendid), director, producer
- Nicolas Mahut (born 1982), tennis player
- Patrick Modiano (born 1945), writer, winner of the 2014 Nobel Prize in Literature
- Nelson Monfort (born 1954), television presenter, translator, sports commentator for French public television
- Thibault de Montaigu (born 1978), writer and journalist
- Roger Monteaux (1879–1974), actor
- Joachim, 8th Prince Murat (born 1944), aristocrat
- Charles, Prince Napoléon (born 1950), aristocrat and descendant of Jerome Bonaparte
- Bulle Ogier (born Marie-France Thielland, 1939), actress
- Pedro Henrique of Orléans-Braganza (1909–1981), Head of the Imperial House of Brazil (disputed)
- Florence Parly (born 1963), politician, Minister of the Armed Forces
- Claude Pinoteau (1925–2012), actor, director, writer and producer
- François Polgár (born 1946), choir conductor
- Jérôme Pradon (born 1964), stage actor
- Jean-François Ricard (born 1956), prosecutor of the National Terrorism Prosecution Office for the prosecution of terrorism in France
- Thierry Roland (1934–2012), football specialist, sports journalist, television commentator and presenter
- Baron Edmond James de Rothschild (1845–1934), philanthropist and activist for Jewish affairs
- Tiphaine Samoyault (born 1968, French university lecturer, literary critic, and novelist
- Véronique Sanson (born 1949), singer
- Alain Sarde (born 1952), former actor, now writer and producer
- Catherine Spaak (born 1945), actress
- Agnès Spaak (born 1944), actress
- Georgette Tissier (1910–1957), actress
- Marie Trintignant (1962–2003), actress
- Gaspard Ulliel (1984-2022), actor, model
- Michael Vartan (born 1968), French-American actor
- Marin de Viry (born 1962), writer
- Zazie (Isabelle de Truchis de Varennes, born 1964), singer-songwriter
- Prince Lorenz of Belgium Archduke of Austria-Este, Prince Royal of Hungary (born 1955)

== International relations ==
Boulogne-Billancourt is twinned with:

- Anderlecht, Belgium
- Hammersmith and Fulham (London), England, United Kingdom
- Neukölln (Berlin), Germany
- Marino, Italy
- Pančevo, Serbia
- Ra'anana, Israel
- Irving, United States
- Sousse, Tunisia

== See also ==
- Communes of the Hauts-de-Seine department
- Alcatel-Lucent
- AC Boulogne-Billancourt
- Boulogne-Billancourt Half Marathon
- Raymond Couvègnes
