= Halle Tony Garnier =

Concert hall in Lyon, France

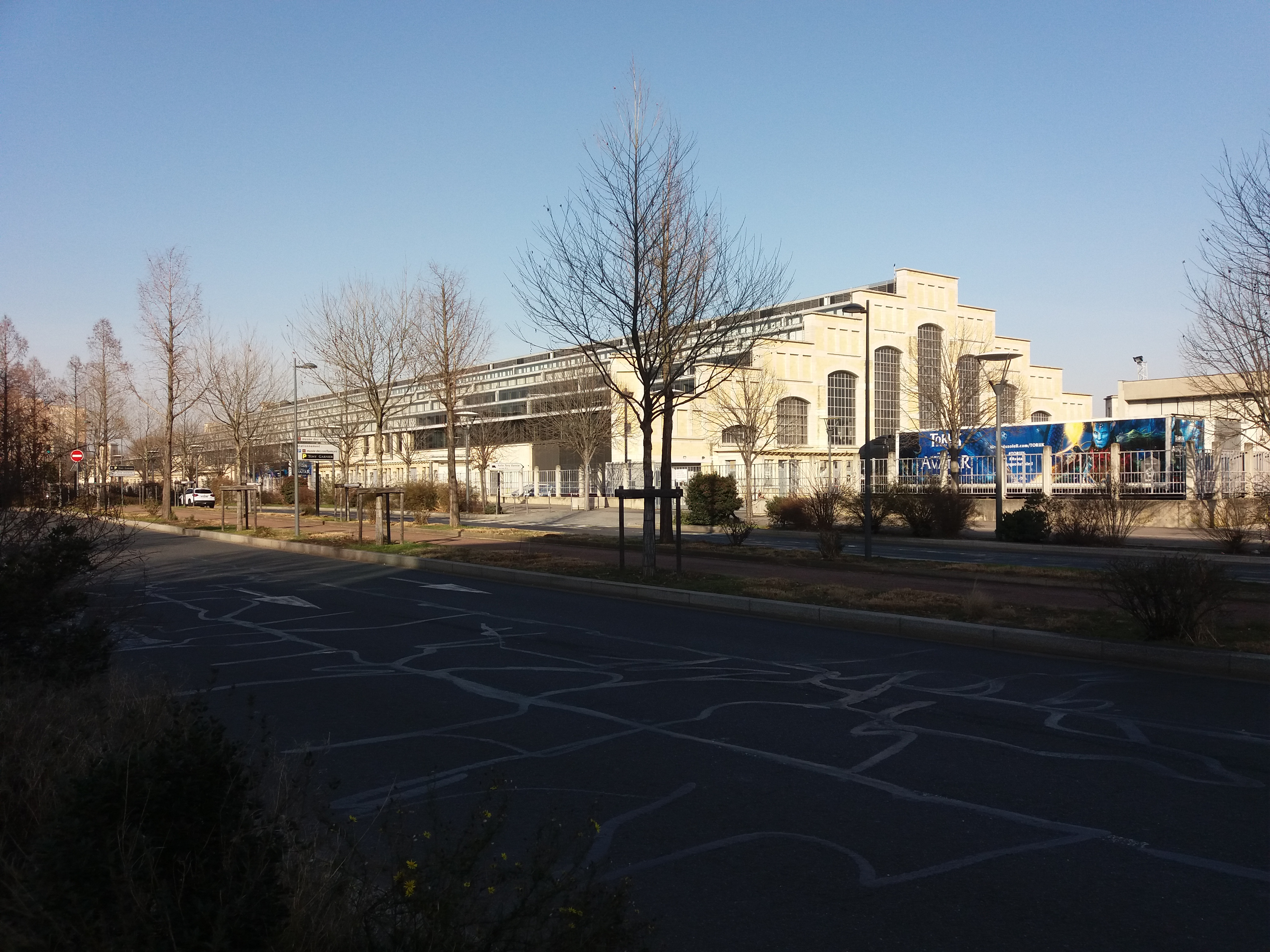
- The hall in February 2019
- Interactive map of Halle Tony Garnier
- Address: 20 Place docteurs Charles et Christophe Mérieux; 69007 Lyon, France
- Location: 7e arrondissement, Gerland
- Coordinates: 45°43′47.60″N 4°49′29.80″E
- Owner: City of Lyon
- Capacity: 17,000 (standing); 5,000 seated
- Public transit: Halle Tony Garnier

Construction
- Opened: January 1988
- Renovated: 1999–2000
- Cost: €18 million
- Architect: Tony Garnier

Website
- Venue website (in French)

The Halle Tony Garnier is an arena and concert hall in Lyon, France. It was designed by Tony Garnier in 1905. Originally a slaughterhouse, the building was renovated in 1987 and opened as a concert hall in 1988. With a standing capacity of nearly 17,000, it is the third biggest venue in France after the Accor Arena and Paris La Défense Arena. It will ice hockey for the 2030 Winter Olympics with the French Alps as the main host.

== History ==
The original building opened in 1908 as a cattle market and slaughterhouse, known as "La Mouche". During World War I, the building was used as an armory until 1928, when it returned to a cattle market and slaughterhouse. The market and slaughterhouse closed in 1967. On 16 May 1975, the building was recognized as a Monument historique. In 1987, the City of Lyon hired Reichen & Robert and HTVS to renovate the slaughterhouse into a modern concert hall. The Hall opened in late January 1988.

=== The previous slaughterhouses in Lyon ===
In the 19th century, before the Mouche Slaughterhouse, Lyon had another two slaughterhouses. One opened in 1839 in the Perrache district, (Note: In the square currently formed by Quai Perrache, Cours Bayard, Rue Casimir-Perier and Rue Delandine.) and the other was built in 1858 by Tony Desjardins in Vaise. (Note: On the land adjoining Rue Louis-Loucheur and Rue de la Grange.) These slaughterhouses were criticized as being too small, inconvenient, and too close to the houses. In the end, the Perrache slaughterhouse were closed for sanitary reasons.

=== Background ===
In 1887, the city's elite began to consider the construction of a much larger and more remote site that would meet all the criteria of a modern, hygienic structure. However, the city government was opposed both by the managers of the existing slaughterhouses as well as by the many artisans who benefited from the slaughterhouses in their respective neighborhoods.

In 1892, when the leases expired, the City Council took over the management of the two slaughterhouses and immediately resumed studying how to create a new complex in the Mouche district. However, opposition slowed things down, and it was Mayor Victor Augagneur who got the project moving. He obtained a prefectural decree that definitively established the future slaughterhouse in the Mouche district.

In 1906, Tony Garnier also visited the site under the leadership of new mayor, Édouard Herriot, who had replaced V. Augagneur.

=== Project ===
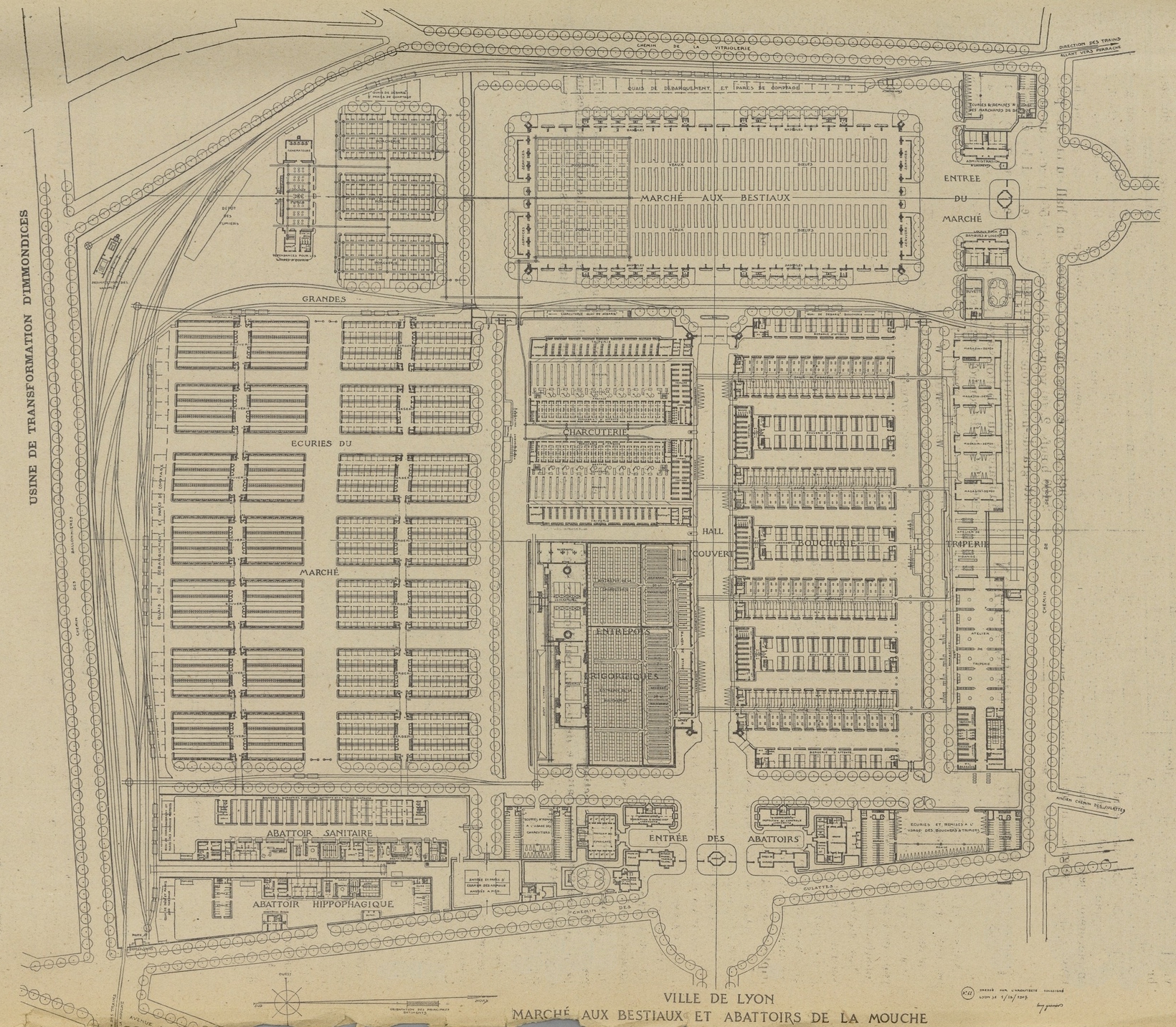
Plan of the Mouche Slaughterhouses in Lyon 7th district, designed by Tony Garnier and reproduced in Construction Lyonnaise, n°2, 01/19/1909.

The site of La Colombière, in the Mouche district of Gerland, was selected in 1901 and was the subject of a declaration of public utility in 1903. The area had access to the Paris-Lyon-Méditerranée railroad network.

Édouard Herriot, in consultation with Eugène Deruelle, head veterinarian of the municipal services and technical director of the Park of the Golden Head, asked Tony Garnier to draw up the floor plans. In 1905, Deruelle took charge of the city's vaccination and slaughterhouse department.

On 5 October 1908 the final design for the Mouche Slaughterhouse was approved. On 30 June 1906, Tony Garnier was appointed architect by the city government.

=== First construction site ===
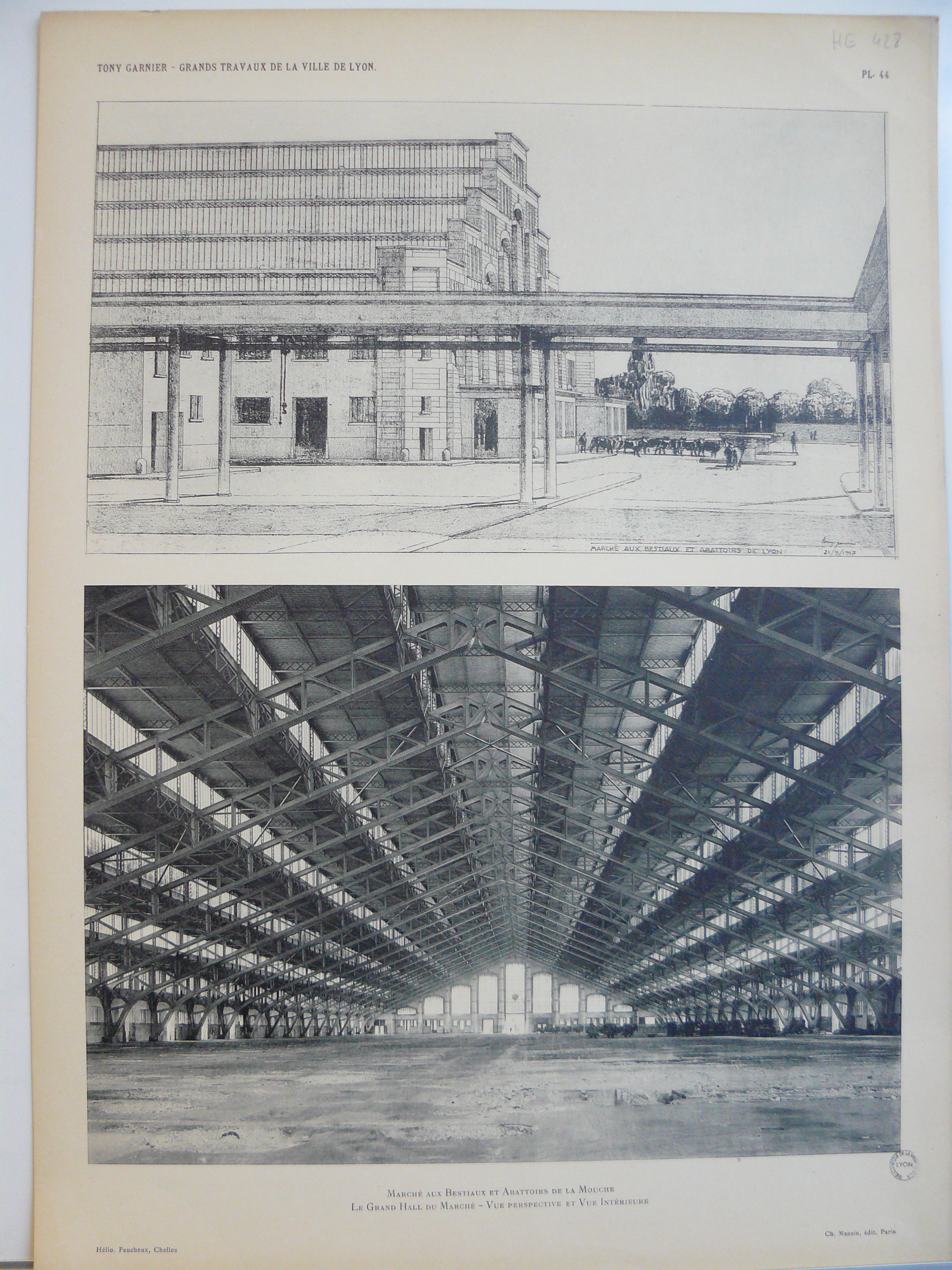
Cattle market and Mouche Slaughterhouse: the market's main hall, perspective view and interior view by Tony Garnier (pl. 44) from the collection "Major works in the city of Lyon: studies, projects and completed works 1921".

The flooding of the site, which was raised by three meters over the entire 23-hectare area, was one of the technical concerns. Anticipating all actions to rationalize the tasks of the various participants and, above all, their movements, Tony Garnier created an immense complex. He designed a large cattle market of 80 x 210 meters in a 17,000 square-meter hall with a "bold" steel structure of the Fives-Lille type on ball and socket joints developed by Victor Contamin. This structure does not rest on columns.

The place had refrigeration rooms, slaughter rooms, a restaurant, and a garage. A dedicated station served all of them with six unloading platforms. With a single direction of circulation, all the handling operations are on the same level.

Although Tony Garnier had originally planned to use concrete for all the structures, he opted for a steel truss structure for the roof of the main hall, which was the dominant feature of the rest of the project. Since the second half of the 19th century, this structure has been used for halls and railway stations (Polonceau truss). It is associated with the transparency of glass for the halls, which was becoming a common product at the time of this construction. Apart from this structure, the overall architecture is that of the classical roof terrace, a personal vision of Garnier's, which was used for all the other buildings.

The roof of the main hall is made of reinforced tiles, while the slabs and stepped pediments are made of clinker and cover the concrete foundations. Work began in 1909 and was completed in 1914.

=== The International Exhibition of 1914 ===
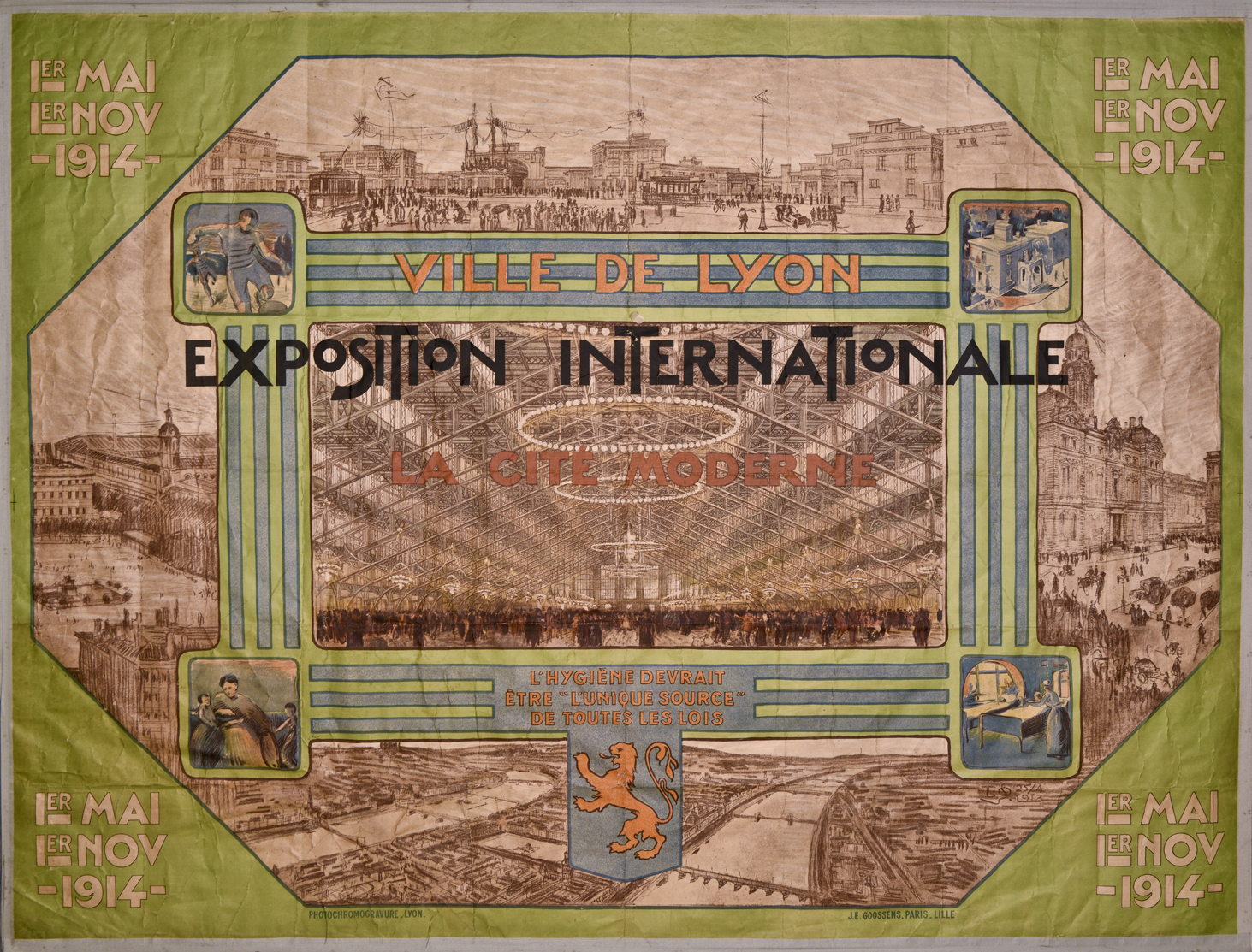
Poster by Tony Garnier, 1913, Lyon Municipal Archives.

In 1914, the site was the venue for the International Urban Exposition, whose theme was "The Modern City and Hygiene". The exposition covered an area of 75 hectares, with more than 17,000 square meters dedicated to foreign and colonial pavilions. A total of 17,232 companies presented their economic and industrial activities. The automobile and transport, lighting, metallurgy and heating sections were located in the Great Hall. The silk and clothing sections were located on the public avenue. The slaughterhouse under construction was visited by one million people. From 1 August, the number of visitors decreased, and on 6 August, the German and Austrian pavilions were closed, the goods of the enemy nations were confiscated, and the exhibition was finally closed on 11 November 1914, after the outbreak of WWI.

== World War I ==
During the World War I, the site was requisitioned and named the Arsenal de la Mouche. Initially, repatriated wounded were housed in the halls of the Mouche Slaughterhouse. The Electric Lighting Company moved (a Parisian company) to Lyon and was transformed into an armaments factory as part of the war effort. 12,000 men and women were employed at the plant, which produced 20,000 shells a day for shipment to the front.

== Slaughterhouse and cattle market ==
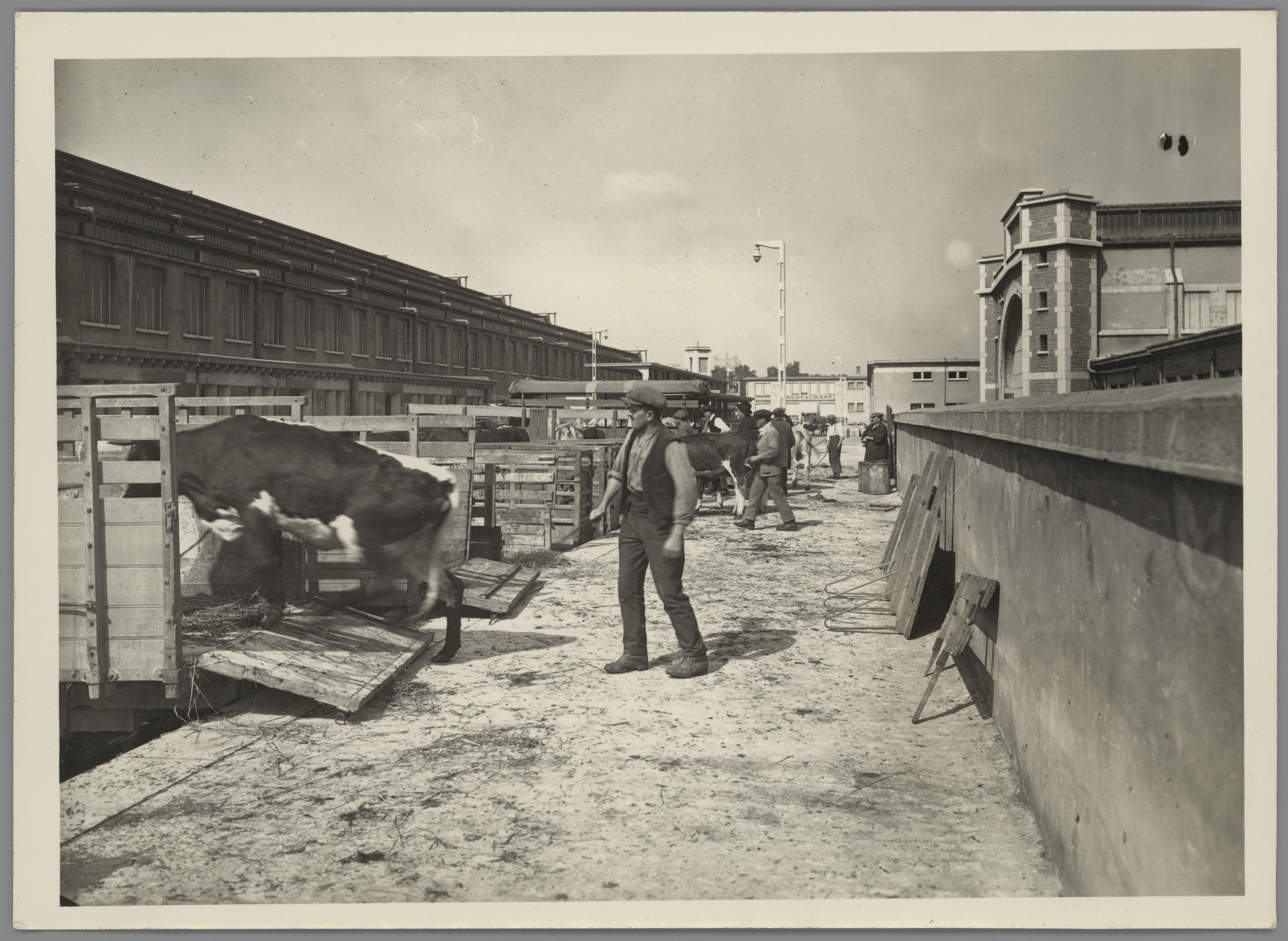
Mouche Slaughterhouse and cattle market.

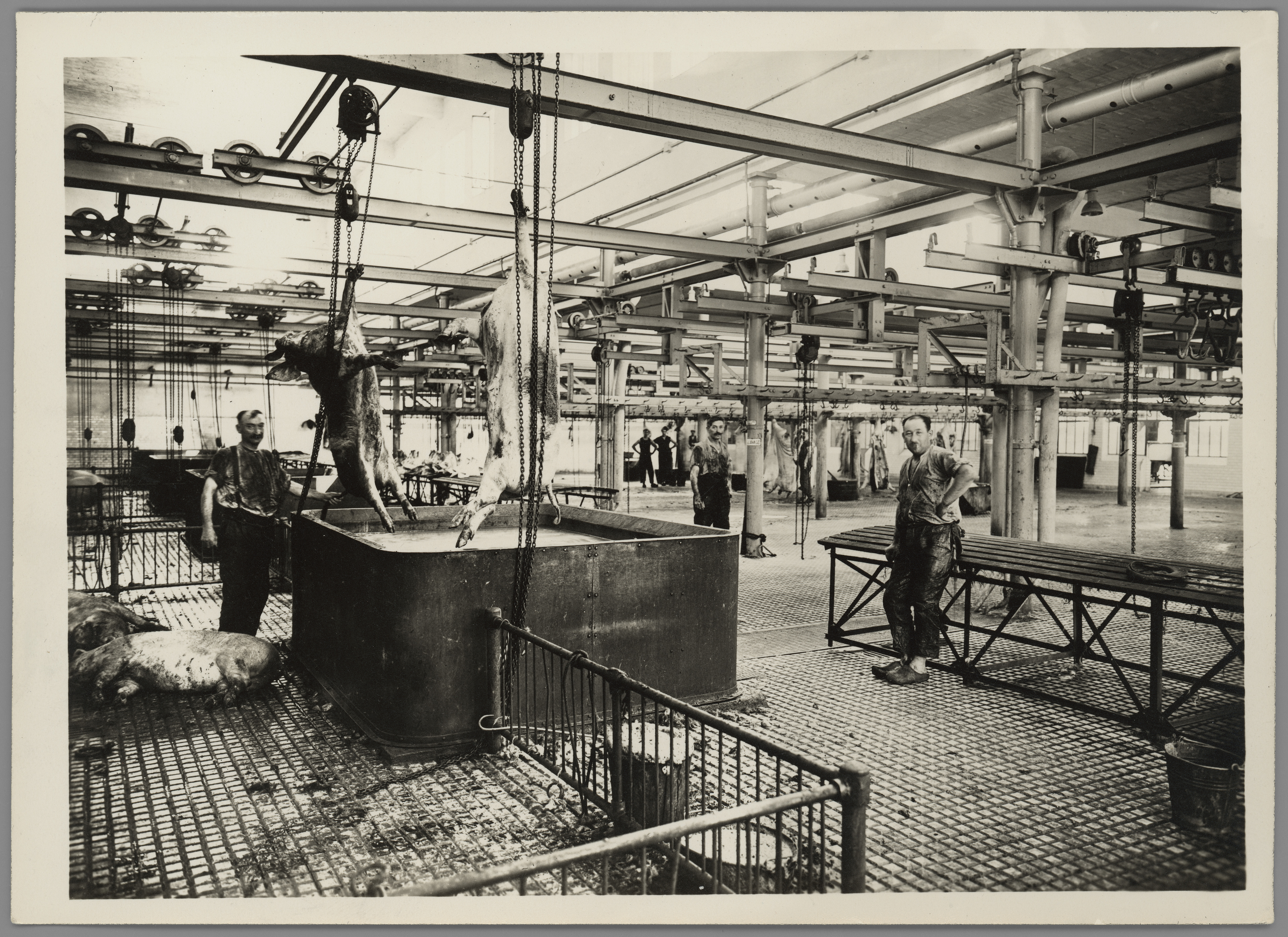
Mouche Slaughterhouse and cattle market.

The resumption of the construction work was in 1924 and the inauguration of the slaughterhouse and market was on 9 September 1928. The area was 240,000 square meters. The market accommodated 4,000 cattle, 8,000 sheep, and 3,500 pigs.

Historically in France, the health responsibilities of local authorities have led to the management of a slaughterhouse on land belonging to the municipality, which another company can take over; the whole operation is budgeted with the taxes collected. The slaughterhouse complex is an economic entity of great importance at a time when meat consumption is rising sharply. Thanks to rapid rail transportation, affects the established structure of meat animal production and thus expands the regional scale. Based on the Chicago Slaughterhouse, the Mouche industrial complex distinguishes two businesses: slaughter and trade. Associated with the slaughterhouse was a leather and gut business in the Gerland district, with outlets for leather goods, tennis racket strings and surgical ligatures. In 1966, national legislation placed this activity under the jurisdiction of the Grand-Lyon. Cattle traders, butchers, charcutiers and tripe butchers worked here until 1967 when the slaughterhouse was moved to Corbas. In the last period, this know-how was divided among 57 companies of the new non-local economic structure: the Régie Cibieval (created in 1975). In 1967, the Gerland buildings were abandoned.

== Historic monument ==
In 1975, a strong media campaign drew attention to the possible destruction of the work of Tony Garnier. The Halle and its pavilions at the Mouche Slaughterhouse were listed as historical monuments in Lyon. Although protected, the Halle was abandoned and unused for years.

== Renaissance as a concert hall ==
In 1987, before any official decision had been made on the use of the building, the City of Lyon decided to commission the architects Reichen & Robert to restore it.

The work was colossal: repairing the floor, creating basements for technical rooms, and creating technical columns for modular spaces. The architectural structure is enhanced by Eiffel Tower-style lighting on the metal arches. In compliance with current safety standards, the hall has a seating capacity of 4,416 to 5,496 and a total capacity of 17,000.

The renovated hall, known as the "Halle Tony-Garnier", became Lyon's official cultural venue in December 1988. It is the venue for a wide range of events: film shoots, concerts, trade fairs, and conventions. Its first concerts (Mylène Farmer and Paul McCartney) brought it international attention. At the time, it was the second-largest concert hall in France. Its eclectic programming (Telethon, Festival Berlioz, Festival Lumière, concerts by French and international artists) and its geographical location made it popular.

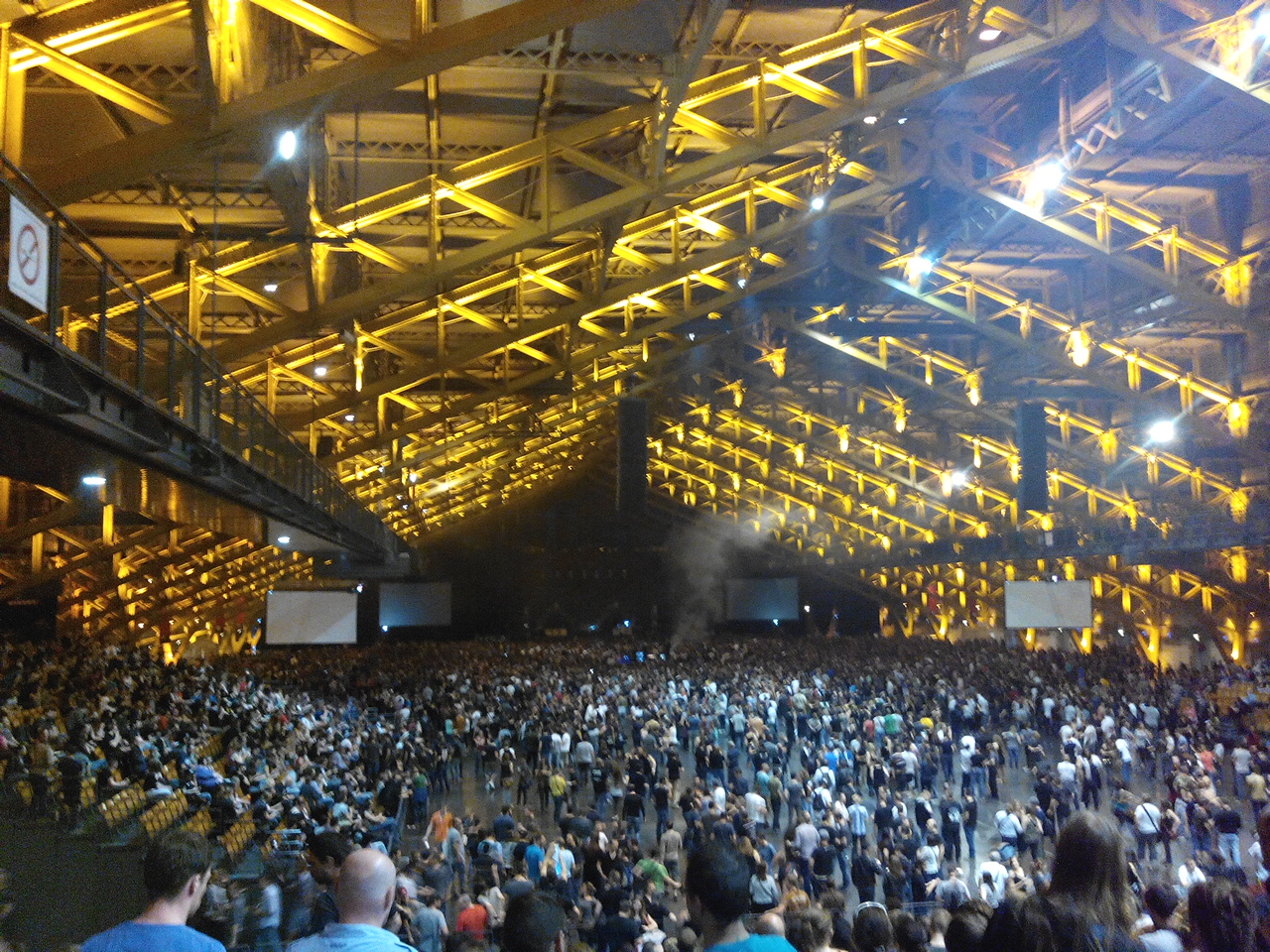
Interior view of the Halle Tony Garnier, during a System of a Down concert, 14 April 2015

In 2000, the venue's modularity, soundproofing, technical aisles, and retractable seating were optimized by the architect Albert Constantin's Atelier de la Rize. These improvements made it possible to modernize the lighting and to perfect its use as an auditorium.

When the Musée d'Art Contemporain de Lyon organized the first European Biennial of Contemporary Art in Lyon in 1997, the reputation of the concert and exhibition hall was established. Since 1991, this biennial has been associated with several European film and dance biennials. In 2019, the exhibition "The Hall, a Stage Beast", organized in partnership with the Lyon City Archives, coincided with the 150th anniversary of the birth of Tony Garnier.

== Shows ==
- Events: Mahana (tourism), the Student
- Concerts: a-ha, Arcade Fire, AC/DC, Aerosmith, Another Level, Ariana Grande, Alizée, Charles Aznavour, Beyoncé, The Blackout, The Bravery, Biffy Clyro, Bon Jovi, Coldplay, Phil Collins, The Corrs, The Cranberries, Deep Purple, Depeche Mode, Celine Dion, Dire Straits, Bob Dylan, Fad Gadget, Mylène Farmer, The Fatima Mansions, Garbage, Genesis, The Gossip, Green Day, Guns N' Roses, Janet Jackson, Keane, Alicia Keys, Mark Knopfler, Lenny Kravitz, Lady Gaga, Avril Lavigne, Les Enfoirés, Limp Bizkit, Lorie, Marilyn Manson, Massive Attack, Brian May, Paul McCartney, Metallica, George Michael, Kylie Minogue, Motörhead, Muse, Nightwish, Noisettes, Oberkampf, The Offspring, Page & Plant, Sean Paul, Laura Pausini, Katy Perry, P!nk, Placebo, Red Hot Chili Peppers, Lionel Richie, Rihanna, Michel Sardou, Scorpions, Semi Precious Weapons, Soulsavers, Britney Spears, Spice Girls, Bruce Springsteen, Sting, Sum 41, Superbus, System of a Down, Justin Timberlake, Tokio Hotel, Tool, Tina Turner, U2, Usher, Vitaa, Robbie Williams, Violetta Live, James Blunt, Zazie, ZZ Top, Laura Pausini, Within Temptation Imagine Dragons, Ariana Grande, Chris Brown, Soy Luna Live, Dream Theater and Dua Lipa.
- Spectacles and Performances: Holiday on Ice, Riverdance, Le Roi Soleil, Les Restos du coeur (several times), Johnny Haliday and The Sun King

== Accessibility ==
Halle Tony Garnier is served by the TCL public transport network:

- : at the station Halle Tony Garnier
- : at the stop Halle Tony Garnier
- : at the stop Place Docteurs Mérieux
- : at the station Debourg (with walking distance or connection with line)

Vélo'v stations:

- Avenue Tony Garnier/Voie nouvelle (Halle Tony-Garnier) – Place de l'École/rue de St-Cloud.

== See also ==
- List of theatres and entertainment venues in Lyon
- List of indoor arenas in France
