= Tony Garnier (architect) =

French architect (1869–1948)

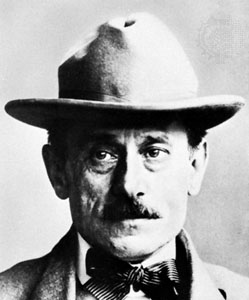
- Portrait of Tony Garnier
- Born: 13 August 1869; Lyon, France
- Died: 19 January 1948 (aged 78); Roquefort-la-Bédoule, France
- Education: École nationale des beaux-arts de Lyon; École nationale supérieure des Beaux-Arts
- Occupation: Architect
- Awards: Prix de Rome
- Buildings: Halle Tony Garnier, Stade de Gerland
- Projects: Cité Industrielle

Tony Garnier (13 August 1869 – 19 January 1948) was a noted French architect and city planner. He was most active in his home city of Lyon, where he notably designed the Halle Tony Garnier and Stade de Gerland. Garnier is considered one of the forerunners of 20th-century French architects.

== Biography ==
After learning painting and drafting at the École Technique de la Martinière in Lyon (1883–1886), Garnier studied architecture at the École nationale des beaux-arts de Lyon (1886–1889) and the École nationale supérieure des Beaux-Arts in Paris (1890–1899). In 1899 he won the Prix de Rome for a design of a national bank. The prize enabled him to reside at the Villa Medici in Rome for four years, until 1904. During his stay in Rome he began working on the project of an industrial city that became his main contribution to town planning.

In 1901, after extensive study of sociological and architectural problems, he began to formulate an elaborate solution to the perceived issues concerning urban design. His basic idea included the separation of spaces by function through zoning into several categories: industrial, civic, residential, health related, and entertainment. Garnier's drawings for an ideal industrial city called Une cité industrielle were initially exhibited in 1904, but only published later in 1918.

Une Cité Industrielle was designed as an utopian form of living, for 35,000 inhabitants. It was located between a mountain and a river to facilitate access to hydroelectric power. This plan was highly influenced by the writings of Émile Zola, in particular his socialist utopian novel Travail (1901). The plan allowed schools and vocational-type schools to be near the industries they were related to, so that people could be more easily educated. There were no churches or law enforcement buildings, in hope that man could rule himself. The idea of functional separation was later taken up by the members of CIAM, and would ultimately influence the design of cities like Brasília.

In 1904, Garnier returned to Lyon, where he received a commission for a livestock market and slaughterhouse (1906–1924), later named Halle Tony Garnier. In 1910, he was commissioned for the design of the Édouard-Hérriot Hospital, completed in 1927. Further projects included several villas, the Stade de Gerland (Gerland stadium) (1914–1918) and the low-cost housing Quartier des Etats-Unis (1919–1935) on United-States avenue in the 8th arrondissement of Lyon.

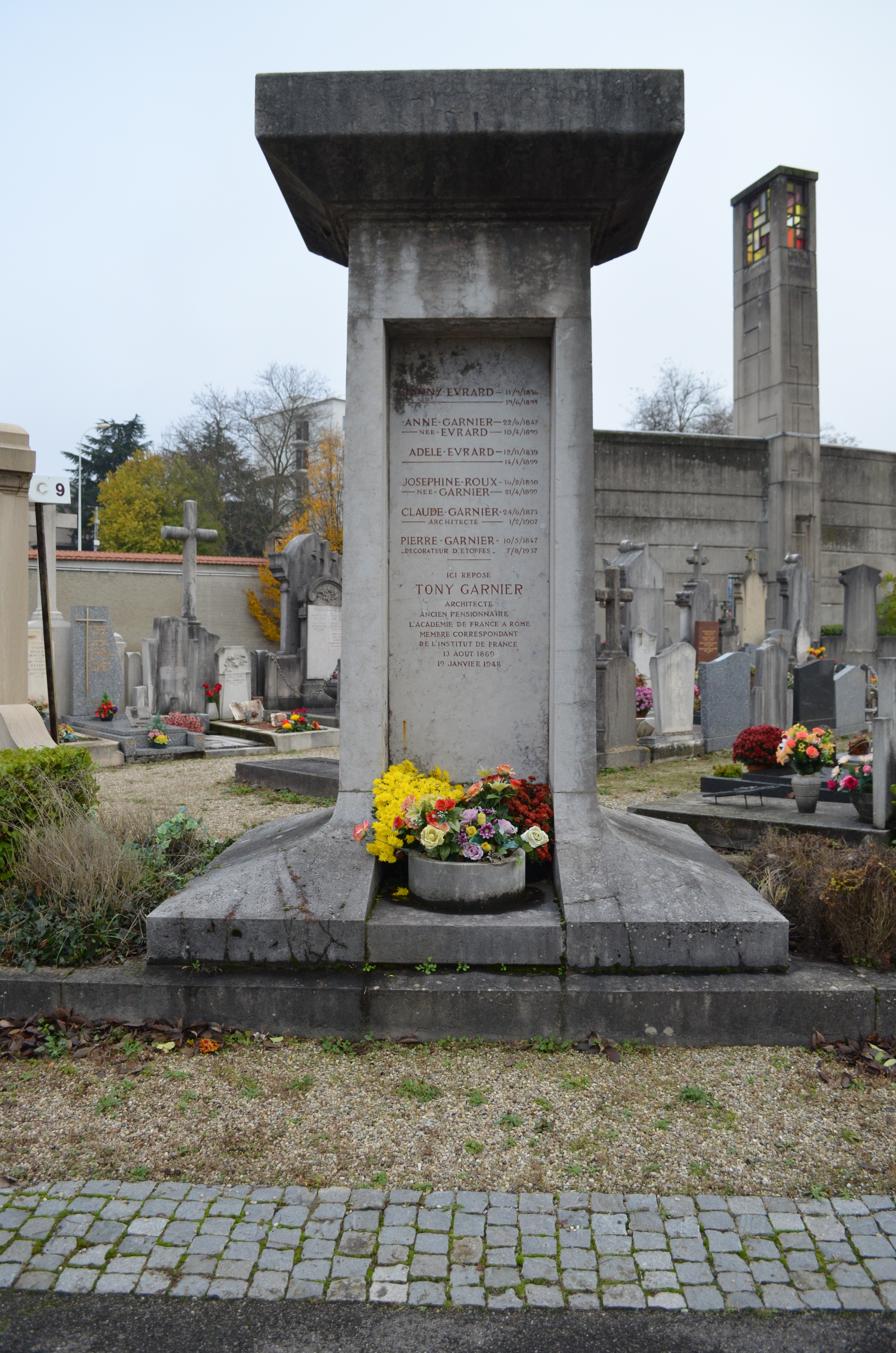
Grave of Tony Garnier

In the 1920s, Garnier continued the work on several major projects started before the war. In 1939, he moved from Lyon to Roquefort-la-Bédoule, where he died in 1948. He is buried in the Croix-Rousse cemetery.

== Selected projects ==
- Cité Industrielle, project for an ideal city, 1904
- Rothschild Foundation Housing, Paris (competition entry), 1905
- Slaughterhouse and Stockyard, later named after him Halle Tony Garnier, Lyon, 1905–1924 (now a music venue, where coincidentally another Tony Garnier performed in 2010 as part of Bob Dylan's band)
- Vacherie du Parc, Lyon, 1904–1905
- Grange-Blanche Hospital (now H. Edouard Herriot Hospital), Lyon, 1910–1927
- Villa Tony Garnier, Saint-Rambert, Lyon, 1911
- Stade de Gerland municipal stadium, Lyon, 1914–1918
- Quartier des Etats-Unis housing, Lyon, 1919–1935
- Villa Gros, Saint-Didier, 1921
- Sanatorium, Saint-Hilaire de Touvet, 1923
- Lyon and Saint-Etienne Pavilions, International Exposition of Modern Industrial and Decorative Arts, Paris, 1925
- Hôtel de Ville, Boulogne-Billancourt, (with Jacques Debat-Ponsan), 1934

== Publications ==
- 1918 Une Cité Industrielle: Etude pour la construction des villes
- 1920 Les grands travaux de la ville de Lyon
- Chambon, Catherine, Jacques Bonniel, et al; Tony Garnier, L’Air Du Temps; Lyon, France, Musée Urbain Tony Garnier, 2019.

== Related articles ==
- War memorial on Île du Souvenir
