= Edgar Faure =

69th Prime Minister of France

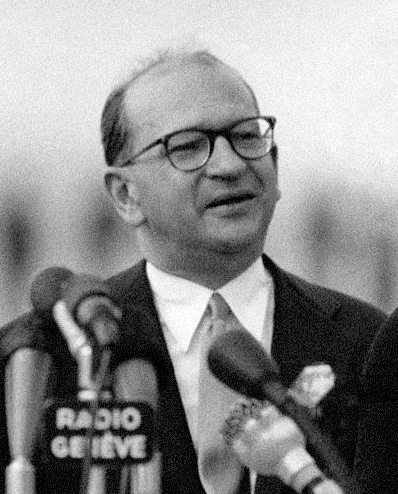
- Edgar Faure in 1955

Prime Minister of France
- In office 23 February 1955 – 1 February 1956
- President: René Coty
- Preceded by: Pierre Mendès France
- Succeeded by: Guy Mollet
- In office 20 January 1952 – 8 March 1952
- President: Vincent Auriol
- Preceded by: René Pleven
- Succeeded by: Antoine Pinay

President of the National Assembly
- In office 2 April 1973 – 2 April 1978
- Preceded by: Achille Peretti
- Succeeded by: Jacques Chaban-Delmas

Personal details
- Born: Edgar Jean Faure; 18 August 1908 Béziers, France
- Died: 30 March 1988 (aged 79) 7th arrondissement of Paris, France
- Party: Radical Party (1929–1956; 1958–1965; 1977–1988)
- Other political affiliations: Union for the New Republic (1965–1967); Union of Democrats for the Republic (1967–1977); Rally for the Republic (1977)
- Spouse: Lucie Meyer

Edgar Jean Faure (French: [ɛdɡaʁ ʒɑ̃ fɔʁ]; 18 August 1908 – 30 March 1988) was a French politician, lawyer, essayist, historian and memoirist who served as Prime Minister of France in 1952 and again between 1955 and 1956. Prior to his election to the National Assembly for Jura under the Fourth Republic in 1946, he was a member of the French Committee of National Liberation (CFLN) in Algiers (1943–1944). A Radical, Faure was married to writer Lucie Meyer. In 1978, he was elected to the Académie Française.

== Life ==
Faure was born in Béziers, Hérault, to a French Army doctor. He was nearsighted yet a brilliant student since his youth, earning a baccalauréat at 15, as well as a law degree at 19 in Paris. At 21 years of age he became a member of the bar association, the youngest lawyer in France to do so at the time. While living in Paris, he became active in Third Republic politics; he joined the Radical Party in 1929.

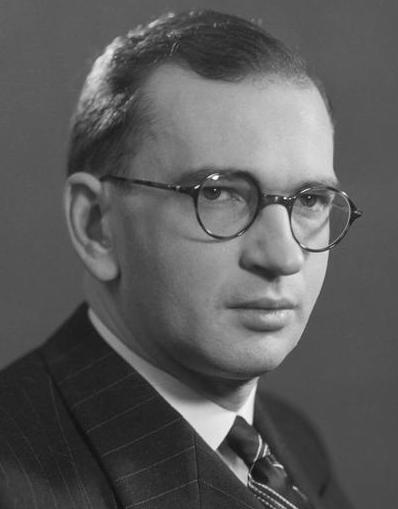
Faure in 1939

During the German occupation of World War II, he joined the French Resistance in the Maquis. In 1942, he fled to Charles de Gaulle's headquarters in Algiers, where he was made head of the Provisional Government of the Republic's legislative department. At the end of the war, he served as French counsel for the prosecution at the Nuremberg Trials.

In 1946, he was elected to the French Parliament as a Radical. While the popularity of his party declined to less than 10% of the total vote, none of the other parties was able to gain a clear majority. Therefore, early on, his party often played a disproportionately important role in the formation of governments. He thus led the cabinet in 1952 and from 1955 to 1956. Faure was a leader of the more conservative wing of the party, opposing the party's left, under Pierre Mendès France.

Faure's views changed during the Fourth Republic; after initial opposition to the Fifth Republic (he voted against presidential election by universal suffrage in the 1962 referendum), he eventually became a Gaullist. The Gaullist Party, the Union for the New Republic, sent him on an unofficial mission to the People's Republic of China in 1963. In government he served in successive ministries: Agriculture (1966–1968), National Education (1968–1969, where he was responsible for pushing through reform of the universities) and Social Affairs (1972–1973). He declined to be a candidate at the 1974 presidential election, in which he supported Valéry Giscard d'Estaing against the Gaullist candidate, Jacques Chaban-Delmas.

He had the reputation of a careerist and the nickname of "weathercock". He replied with humour, "it is not the weathercock which turns; it is the wind!"

He was a member of the National Assembly for the Jura department from 1946 to 1958, as well as for the Doubs department from 1967 to 1980. He presided over the National Assembly from 1973 to 1978. He sought another term as President of the Assembly President in 1978 but was defeated by Chaban-Delmas. Faure was a Senator from 1959 to 1967 for Jura and again, in 1980, for Doubs. In 1978, he became a member of the Académie Française.

On the regional, departmental and local levels, Edgar Faure was Mayor of Port-Lesney, Jura from 1947 to 1971 and again from 1983 to 1988, as well as Mayor of Pontarlier between 1971 and 1977; he served as President of the General Council of the Jura department from 1949 to 1967, then member of the General Council of the Doubs from 1967 to 1979, President of the Regional Council of Franche-Comté (1974–1981, 1982–1988). He played a key role during the creation and first years of the Assembly of European Regions (AER), becoming his first president in 1985 and staying in that position until 1988.

== Personal life ==
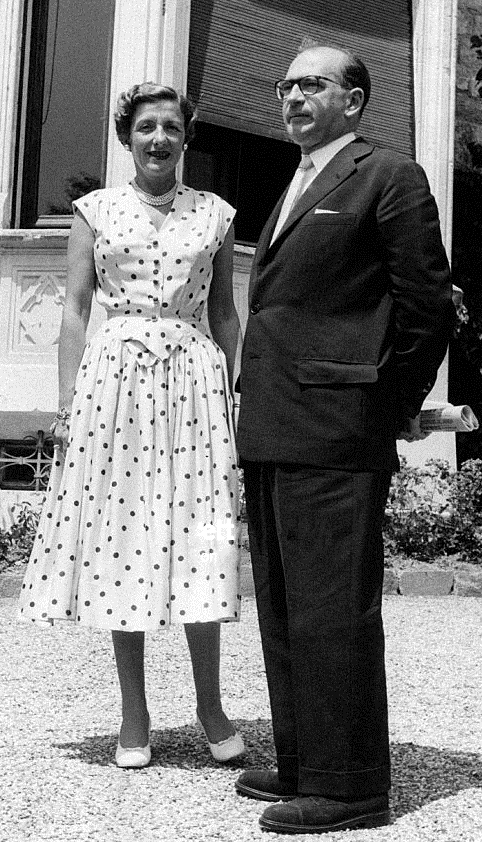
Lucie and Edgar Faure in 1955

In 1931, Faure married writer Lucie Meyer, a daughter of a silk merchant. They spent their one-month-long honeymoon in the Soviet Union.

In his 1997 book, The Zubial, author Alexandre Jardin recounts how Faure would spend time with his father, Pascal Jardin.

== Political career ==
Governmental functions

- President of the Council (Prime Minister): January–February 1952 / February–December 1955
- Secretary of State for Finance: 1949–1950
- Minister of the Budget: 1950–1951
- Minister of Justice: 1951–1952
- Minister of Finance and Economic Affairs: 1953–1955
- Minister of Foreign Affairs: January–February 1955
- Minister of Finance, Economic Affairs and Planning: May–June 1958
- Minister of Agriculture: 1966–1968
- Minister of National Education: 1968–1969
- Minister of State, Minister of Social Affairs: 1972–1973

Electoral mandates

- President of the National Assembly of France: 1973–1978
- Member of the National Assembly of France for Doubs: Elected in 1967, 1968, but remains a cabinet member / 1973–1980
- Member of the National Assembly of France for Jura: 1946–1958
- Senator for Jura: 1959–1966 (became a cabinet member in 1966)
- Senator for Doubs: 1980–1988 (died in 1988)
- President of the Regional Council of Franche-Comté: 1974–1981 / 1982–1988 (died in 1988)
- Mayor of Port-Lesney: 1947–1970 / 1983–1988 (died in 1988)
- Mayor of Pontarlier: 1971–1977
- President of the General Council of Jura: 1949–1967
- General councillor of Jura: 1967–1979

== Global policy ==
He was one of the signatories of the agreement to convene a convention for drafting a world constitution. As a result, for the first time in human history, a World Constituent Assembly convened to draft and adopt a Constitution for the Federation of Earth.

== Bibliography ==
He published the following books:

- Le serpent et la tortue (les problèmes de la Chine populaire), Juillard, 1957
- La disgrâce de Turgot, Gallimard, 1961
- La capitation de Dioclétien, Sirey 1961
- Prévoir le présent, Gallimard, 1966
- L'éducation nationale et la participation, Plon, 1968
- Philosophie d'une réforme, Plon, 1969
- L'âme du combat, Fayard, 1969
- Ce que je crois, Grasset, 1971
- Pour un nouveau contrat social, Seuil, 1973
- Au-delà du dialogue avec Philippe Sollers, Balland, 1977
- La banqueroute de Law, Gallimard, 1977
- La philosophie de Karl Popper et la société politique d'ouverture, Firmin Didot, 1981
- Pascal: le procès des provinciales, Firmin Didot, 1930
- Le pétrole dans la paix et dans la guerre, Nouvelle revue critique 1938
- Mémoires I, "Avoir toujours raison, c'est un grand tort", Plon, 1982
- Mémoires II, "Si tel doit être mon destin ce soir", Plon, 1984
- Discours prononcé pour la réception de Senghor à l'Académie française, le 29 mars 1984

== Governments ==
=== First ministry (20 January – 8 March 1952) ===
- Edgar Faure – President of the Council and Minister of Finance
- Georges Bidault – Vice President of the Council and Minister of National Defense
- Henri Queuille – Vice President of the Council
- Robert Schuman – Minister of Foreign Affairs
- Pierre Pflimlin – Minister for the Council of Europe
- Maurice Bourgès-Maunoury – Minister of Armaments
- Charles Brune – Minister of the Interior
- Robert Buron – Minister of Economic Affairs and Information
- Pierre Courant – Minister of Budget
- Jean-Marie Louvel – Minister of Industry and Energy
- Paul Bacon – Minister of Labour and Social Security
- Léon Martinaud-Deplat – Minister of Justice
- André Morice – Minister of Merchant Marine
- Pierre-Olivier Lapie – Minister of National Education
- Emmanuel Temple – Minister of Veterans and War Victims
- Camille Laurens – Minister of Agriculture
- Louis Jacquinot – Minister of Overseas France
- Antoine Pinay – Minister of Public Works, Transport, and Tourism
- Paul Ribeyre – Minister of Public Health and Population
- Eugène Claudius-Petit – Minister of Reconstruction and Town Planning
- Roger Duchet – Minister of Posts, Telegraphs, and Telephones
- Édouard Bonnefous – Minister of Commerce
- Jean Letourneau – Minister of Partner States
- Joseph Laniel – Minister of State
- François Mitterrand – Minister of State

=== Second ministry (23 February 1955 – 1 February 1956) ===
- Edgar Faure – President of the Council
- Antoine Pinay – Minister of Foreign Affairs
- Pierre Koenig – Minister of National Defense and Armed Forces
- Maurice Bourgès-Maunoury – Minister of the Interior
- Pierre Pflimlin – Minister of Finance and Economic Affairs
- André Morice – Minister of Commerce and Industry
- Paul Bacon – Minister of Labour and Social Security
- Robert Schuman – Minister of Justice
- Paul Antier – Minister of Merchant Marine
- Jean Berthoin – Minister of National Education
- Raymond Triboulet – Minister of Veterans and War Victims
- Jean Sourbet – Minister of Agriculture
- Pierre-Henri Teitgen – Minister of Overseas France
- Édouard Corniglion-Molinier – Minister of Public Works, Transport, and Tourism
- Bernard Lafay – Minister of Public Health and Population
- Roger Duchet – Minister of Reconstruction and Housing
- Édouard Bonnefous – Minister of Posts
- Pierre July – Minister of Moroccan and Tunisian Affairs

Changes

- 6 October 1955 – Pierre Billotte succeeds Koenig as Minister of National Defense and Armed Forces. Vincent Badie succeeds Triboulet as Minister of Veterans and War Victims.
- 20 October 1955 – Pierre July leaves the Cabinet and the office of Minister of Moroccan and Tunisian Affairs is abolished.
- 1 December 1955 – Edgar Faure succeeds Bourgès-Maunoury as interim Minister of the Interior.

Political offices
Preceded by Charles Spinasse	Minister of the Budget; 1950–1951	Succeeded by Pierre Courant
Preceded by René Mayer	Minister of Justice; 1951–1952	Succeeded by Léon Martinaud-Deplat
Preceded by René Pleven	Prime Minister of France; 1952	Succeeded by Antoine Pinay
Preceded by René Mayer	Minister of Finance; 1952	Succeeded by Antoine Pinay
Preceded by Maurice Bourgès-Maunoury	Minister of Finance; 1953–1955	Succeeded by Robert Buron
Preceded by —	Minister of Planning; 1954–1955	Succeeded by Robert Buron
Preceded by Pierre Mendès France	Minister of Foreign Affairs; 1955	Succeeded by Antoine Pinay
Preceded by Pierre Mendès France	Prime Minister of France; 1955–1956	Succeeded by Guy Mollet
Preceded by Maurice Bourgès-Maunoury	Ad interim Minister of the Interior; 1955–1956	Succeeded by Jean Gilbert-Jules
Preceded by Pierre Pflimlin	Minister of Finance, Economic Affairs and Planning; 1958	Succeeded by Antoine Pinay
Preceded by Edgard Pisani	Minister of Agriculture; 1966–1968	Succeeded by Robert Boulin
Preceded by François-Xavier Ortoli	Minister of National Education; 1968–1969	Succeeded by Olivier Guichard
Preceded by —	Minister of State, Minister of Social Affairs; 1972–1973	Succeeded by —
Preceded by Achille Peretti	President of the National Assembly; 1973–1978	Succeeded by Jacques Chaban-Delmas
