= Roger Duchet =

French politician

Minister of Posts, Telegraphs, and Telephones
- In office 4 October 1951 – 28 June 1953
- Preceded by: Joseph Laniel
- Succeeded by: Pierre Ferri

Minister of Reconstruction and Housing
- In office 23 February 1955 – 1 February 1956
- Preceded by: Maurice LeMayre
- Succeeded by: Pierre de Félice

Personal details
- Born: 4 July 1904 Lyon, Rhone, France
- Died: 6 September 1981 (aged 77) Paris, France
- Occupation: Veterinarian

Roger Duchet (French pronunciation: [ʁɔʒe dyʃɛ]; 4 July 1904 – 6 September 1981) was a French veterinarian and politician. He was Minister of PTT from 1951 to 1953, and Minister of Reconstruction from 1955 to 1956. After leaving politics he became involved in film production.

== Early years (1904–39) ==
Roger Duchet was born on 4 July 1904 in Lyon, Rhone. He was a veterinarian by profession. He attended the Veterinary School of Lyon, and graduated in 1928. He set up in practice as a vetinerarian in Beaune in 1928, where he married Simone Serre. In 1931 he was President of the Union of Livestock Breeders.

Duchet was elected mayor of Beaune as a Radical Socialist in October 1932. At the age of 28 he was the youngest mayor in France. He chaired the Radical Socialist Federation of Côte d'Or. In 1937 he was elected to the general council of the Côte-d'Or as representative of Beaune-Sud. He was an energetic and efficient mayor of Beaune. He modernized the city and reorganized the public services. He created a large school, kindergartens, a summer camp, and other improvements. He revived trade fairs and wine festivals, and promoted agriculture in the region.

== World War II (1939–45) ==
During World War II (1939–45) Duchet was mobilized in 1939 as a lieutenant-veterinarian. He was taken prisoner, and released at the end of 1940. During the war Duchet supported Marshal Philippe Pétain. For this, he was deposed on 9 September 1944 after the Liberation of France and replaced by Mr. Louis Lozerand, head of the cantonal council of Liberation of Beaune. However, he was reelected in May 1945. He was then elected councilor-general of Beaune.

== Post-war politics (1946–65) ==
On 8 December 1946 Duchet was elected to the Council of the Republic for Côte d'Or. He helped organize the right-wing Independent Republican group. He was reelected on 7 November 1948, and sat on the Finance and Press committees. In 1949 Duchet, René Coty and Jean Boivin-Champeaux created the Centre National des Indépendants (CNI, National Center of Independents), which became the main party of the French Fourth Republic. Duchet also founded the journal France Indépendante.

During the 1950s Duchet became more conservative. He fought against communism and was in favor of a French Algeria. In the second cabinet of René Pleven he was Secretary of State for Public works from 11 August 1951 to 4 October 1951, then Minister of Posts, Telegraphs, and Telephones. He retained the PTT portfolio in the cabinets of Edgar Faure, Antoine Pinay and René Mayer until 28 June 1953. He was Minister of Reconstruction and Housing from 23 February 1955 to 1 February 1956. He was reelected to the Senate on 19 June 1955.

During the French Fifth Republic Duchet was elected to the Senate on 26 April 1959, and was reelected on 23 September 1962. He belonged to the Groupe des Républicains et Indépendants (Group of Republicans and Independents). The CNI went into decline during the Algerian War. Duchet was often absent from Beaune. and resigned as mayor in 1965.

== Later career (1965–81) ==
After leaving politics, Duchet became interested in the cinema. In 1963 he married Andrée Debar, an actress. After 1965 he appears to have stopped participating in the Senate. He owned the company Euro-France Films, which produced several feature films in the 1960s and 1970s. These included the French productions Le gentleman de Cocody by Christian-Jaque (1965) and Monsieur Papa by Philippe Monnier (1977), and also international co-productions such as Cosa nostra (1972, The Valachi Papers) directed by Terence Young and starring Charles Bronson and Lino Ventura.

Duchet did not run for a third Senate term, and ended his mandate on 1 October 1971. In 1975 he published his memoirs of the Fourth Republic, La République épinglée (The Pinned Republic). The bitter work gave a series of often-cruel portraits of politicians. He died on 6 September 1981 in Paris aged 77.

== Publications ==
- Le Contrôle laitier, Semur-en-Auxois, A. Bordot, 1928.
- Pour le salut public. Les Indépendants devant les grands problèmes nationaux, Paris, Plon, 1958.
- La République épinglée, Paris, Alain Moreau, 1975.

== Films ==
Duchet produced:

- 1965 Le gentleman de Cocody (Ivory Coast Adventure) with Jean Marais, Liselotte Pulver, Philippe Clay
- 1969 L'Étoile du sud (The Southern Star) with George Segal, Ursula Andress, Orson Welles
- 1970 Cannabis (French Intrigue) with Serge Gainsbourg, Jane Birkin, Paul Nicholas

== Sources ==
- "DUCHET Roger - IVe République" (in French). Senate of France.
- "DUCHET Roger - Ve République" (in French). Senate of France.
- "Roger Duchet: 1932-1965" (in French). Ville de Beaune.
