= Jean Letourneau (politician) =

French politician

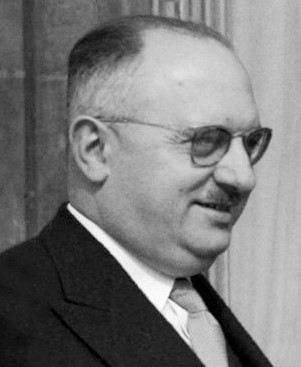
- Letourneau in 1952

Minister of Posts, Telegraphs, and Telephones
- In office 26 January 1946 – 16 December 1946
- Prime Minister: Félix Gouin; Georges Bidault; Vincent Auriol; Léon Blum
- Preceded by: Eugène Thomas
- Succeeded by: Eugène Thomas

Minister of Commerce
- In office 22 January 1947 – 11 August 1947
- Prime Minister: Paul Ramadier
- Preceded by: André Diethelm (Commissaire)
- Succeeded by: Robert Lacoste

Minister of Reconstruction and Urban Development
- In office 9 May 1947 – 22 October 1947
- Prime Minister: Paul Ramadier
- Preceded by: Jules Moch
- Succeeded by: René Coty

Minister of Overseas France
- In office 29 October 1949 – 2 July 1950
- Prime Minister: Georges Bidault
- Preceded by: Paul Coste-Floret
- Succeeded by: Paul Coste-Floret

Minister of Information
- In office 2 July 1950 – 12 July 1950
- Prime Minister: Henri Queuille
- Preceded by: André Malraux
- Succeeded by: Albert Gazier

Minister of State for Relations with Associated States
- In office 12 July 1950 – 28 June 1953
- Prime Minister: René Pleven; Henri Queuille; Edgar Faure; Antoine Pinay; Rene Mayer

Personal details
- Born: 18 September 1907 Le Lude, Sarthe, French Republic
- Died: 16 March 1986 (aged 78) Paris, French Republic
- Occupation: Lawyer

Jean Letourneau (French pronunciation: [ʒɑ̃ lətuʁno]; 18 September 1907 – 16 March 1986) was a French lawyer and politician. He was a lifelong Christian Democrat. During World War II (1939–45) he was active in the French Resistance. After the war he was a deputy in the national legislature from 1945 to 1956, and held various ministerial posts. His most important office was that of Minister, or Minister of State, for Relations with Associated States. He held office between 1950 and 1953. In this role he was responsible for policy in French Indochina (Vietnam, Cambodia and Laos) against the communist movements in those countries. He was strongly anti-communist and in favor of maintaining French authority in the region.

== Early years (1907–39) ==
Jean Letourneau was born in Le Lude, Sarthe, on 18 September 1907. He studied law at the University of Paris. In 1929 he became vice-president of the Association catholique de la Jeunesse française (Catholic Association of French Youth). He obtained his law degree in 1931. He worked for several banks, then was appointed president of the Compagnie française des charbonnages de Dakar (French Coal Company of Dakar), a position he held until 1944.

In 1933 Letourneau joined the Parti Démocrate Populaire (PDP, Democratic People's Party), a small party that tried to combine Christian social democracy with politics. The party was in decline. In 1935 he became an executive of the PDP. From 1934 until the eve of World War II he contributed articles on international politics to the Petit Démocrate, La Croix and L'Aube. These were Christian Democratic journals. Le Petit démocrate was the PDP organ, and L'Aube was directed by Francisque Gay.

== World War II (1939–45) ==
After the defeat of France in 1940 Letourneau joined the French Resistance. He worked in the Liberté movement in the southern zone from January 1941. He returned to the north zone in 1942 and worked with Georges Bidault, president of the Conseil national de la Résistance (CNR, National Council of the Resistance). He helped run Resistance newspapers. After the Liberation of France he was a member of the provisional government from September 1944 to November 1945 as director-general of the Press in the Ministry of Information. He also became a director of the new Christian democratic party, the Mouvement républicain populaire (MRP, Popular Republican Movement).

== Post-war politics (1945–50) ==
Letourneau was elected to the Chamber of Deputies for the Sarthe constituency on 21 October 1945 on the MRP platform. He was reelected on the same platform on 2 June 1946, 10 November 1946 and 17 June 1951. On 27 January 1946 Letourneau was appointed Minister of Posts, Telegraphs and Telephones in the Cabinet of Félix Gouin. On 3 April 1946 he introduced a bill that defined the relationship between the postal service and the SNCF for parcel delivery. He was in favor of nationalization, but on 19 April 1946 opposed the draft Constitution of the Fourth Republic. This text was rejected in the referendum of 5 May 1946, making it necessary to convene a second Constituent Assembly.

Letourneau was reelected on 2 June 1946, with a larger share of the vote, and on 6 August 1946 was again appointed PTT Minister. On 5 October 1946 he spoke on behalf of the government at the division of the Constituent Assembly. On 22 January 1947 he was appoint Minister of Commerce in the government of Paul Ramadier. In May 1947 he was made Minister of Reconstruction and Urban Development in place of Charles Tillon. He left office when Ramadier resigned on 24 November 1947 due to internal disputes in the SFIO.

Letourneau was president of the French Delegation to the United Nations conference on the Freedom of the Press and of Information from 23 March to 3 April 1948. He was French delegate to the United Nations from 1948 to 1949. He was president of the French delegation to the Congress of Franco-Italian Chambers of Commerce from 2–5 September 1948, and president of the conference that resulted in a customs treaty between France and Italy on 26 March 1949. At the start of 1949 he became director of the major Christian Democrat daily, L'Aube. Letourneau belonged to the MRP wing led by Georges Bidault that emphasized the role of the French Union, as opposed to the wing led by Robert Schuman that saw Europe as more important. Letourneau was Minister of Overseas France from 28 October 1949 to 24 June 1950. He was Minister of Information for a few days in July 1950.

== Indochina (1950–53) ==
Letourneau was appointed Minister of State for Relations with the Associated States in July 1950. The Associated States were the French Indochina states of Vietnam, Laos and Cambodia. He held this post through six successive governments until 28 June 1953. During Letourneau's term of office the French were faced with an armed struggle for independence in the Indochina colonies during the Cold War period, which had intensified after the People's Republic of China was created in October 1949. Letourneau was responsible for French policy in Indochina. In his view the fight was essential to prevent the spread of global communism. He also thought that the colonial empire, the French Union, was key to the international status and economic health of France. His objectives were to maintain French influence in Indochina while allowing some political and military independence, but to prevent the communist guerrillas from taking power. Since the national forces were weak, the French army had to be maintained.

In October 1949 Letourneau moved to Indochina with a government mission accompanied by General Alphonse Juin. Letourneau had to deal with a complex administrative situation, with an army commander in charge of military operations while a high commissioner supported by five commissioners was responsible for civil affairs. In December 1950 General Jean de Lattre de Tassigny became commander in chief, and also took the position of high commissioner. On his death on 11 January 1952 the functions were again divided. Letourneau became high commissioner, while remaining Minister for the Associated States, and General Raoul Salan became commander in chief. At the start of 1953 the United States lent support, and in March 1953 Australia also provided assistance. On 27 April 1953 Letourneau became commissioner-general, giving him huge power in defining the policy of France in Indochina. A parliamentary inquiry in May 1953 accused him of dictatorship.

The United States demanded a clear strategy for holding Indochina before they would give additional aid. In March 1953 Letourneau provided an improvised two-part plan. Southern Vietnam would first be pacified and the Vietnamese army expanded to hold the south, and then a decisive blow would secure northern Vietnam by 1955. The Americans were not impressed, and backed the more aggressive plan proposed by General Henri Navarre, the new military commander. (Note: In the event, the Navarre plan was a complete failure, and ended with the 7 May 1954 surrender of the French base at Dien Bien Phu.) In late April 1953 a scandal over illegal currency exchanges came to light, the Piastre Affair. Letourneau was forced out of office on 28 June 1953 in the aftermath. (Note: When Pierre Mendès France proposed to negotiate with the Viet Minh the military and political situation was upset. This was perhaps another reason why Letourneau was left out of the Laniel government that was formed in June 1953.)

== Later career (1953–86) ==
Letourneau remained deputy for the Sarthe until the legislative elections of 2 January 1956, when he failed to retain his seat. He was Councillor General from 1952 to 1958. He was mayor of Chevillé from 1953 to 1963, and was a Councillor of the Union française between 1956 and 1958. He no longer held political office after 1963, but continued to participate in the Christian Democratic movement through associations and published articles. He wrote many articles for local and national papers, and talked in broadcasts about Indochina and the French colonial problem in general. In 1977 he was made a member of the Académie des sciences d'outre-mer. Jean Letourneau died on 16 March 1986 at the military hospital of Val de Grace.

== Honors and Awards ==
- Officer of the Order of Legion of Honour
- Croix de guerre 1939-1945
- Resistance Medal
- Commander of the Order of Commercial Merit (Ordre du Mérite Commercial)

== Sources ==
- Creswell, Michael H. (2011-05-20). "Letourneau, Jean". In Tucker, Spencer C. (ed.). Encyclopedia of the Vietnam War, The: A Political, Social, and Military History: A Political, Social, and Military History. ABC-CLIO. ISBN 978-1-85109-961-0.
- "Jean, Emmanuel LETOURNEAU" (in French). Assemblée Nationale.
- La documentation française (2005). "Jean, Emmanuel LETOURNEAU". Dictionnaire des parlementaires français de 1940 à 1958 (in French). Vol. 5. Paris. ISBN 2-11-005990-7.
- Meissonnier, Antoine; Geneste, Pascal (October 2008). "Les Archives de Jean Le Tourneau (1907–1986)" (PDF) (in French). Archives Nationale.
