= Minister of Posts, Telegraphs, and Telephones =

The Minister of Posts and Telegraphs, to which was later added the charge of Telephones (the position was later named "Minister of Posts and Telecommunications"), was, in the Government of France, the cabinet member in charge of the French Postal Service and development of the national telecommunication system. The position was occasionally combined with Minister of Commerce and Industry or Minister of Public Works. The ministerial position does not currently exist, and its portfolio has largely been merged into other ministerial positions.

== Officeholders ==
=== Ministers of Posts and Telegraphs ===
- Adolphe Cochery : 5 February 1879 – 6 April 1885
- Ferdinand Sarrien : 6 April 1885 – 7 January 1886
- Félix Granet : 7 January 1886 – 30 May 1887
- Jean Marty : 20 March 1894 – 30 May 1894
- Victor Lourties : 30 May 1894 – 26 January 1895
- André Lebon : 26 January 1895 – 1 November 1895
- Gustave Mesureur : 1 November 1895 – 29 April 1896
- Henry Boucher : 29 April 1896 – 28 June 1898
- Émile Maruéjouls : 28 June 1898 – 1 November 1898
- Paul Delombre : 1 November 1898 – 22 June 1899
- Alexandre Millerand : 22 June 1899 – 7 June 1902
- Georges Trouillot : 7 June 1902 – 24 January 1905
- Fernand Dubief : 24 January 1905 – 12 November 1905
- Georges Trouillot : 12 November 1905 – 14 March 1906

=== Public Works, Posts and Telegraphs ===
In 1906 Louis Barthou became Minister of Public Works, Posts and Telegraphs. The combined portfolio lasted until 1913.

- Louis Barthou : 14 March 1906 – 24 July 1909
- Alexandre Millerand : 24 July 1909 – 3 November 1910
- Louis Puech : 3 November 1910 – 2 March 1911
- Charles Dumont : 2 March 1911 – 27 June 1911
- Victor Augagneur : 27 June 1911 – 14 January 1912
- Jean Dupuy : 14 January 1912 – 22 March 1913

=== Commerce, Industry, Posts, and Telegraphs ===
In March 1913 Alfred Massé became Minister of Commerce, Industry, Posts, and Telegraphs.

- Alfred Massé : 22 March 1913 - 9 December 1913
- Louis Malvy : 9 December 1913 – 17 March 1914
- Raoul Péret : 17 March 1914 - 9 June 1914
- Marc Réville : 9 June 1914 – 13 June 1914
- Gaston Thomson : 13 June 1914 – 29 October 1915
- Étienne Clémentel : 29 October 1915 – 27 November 1919
- Louis Dubois : 27 November 1919 – 20 January 1920
- Louis Loucheur : 29 March 1924 - 9 June 1924
- Pierre Étienne Flandin : 9 June 1924 – 14 June 1924
- Henry Chéron : 14 September 1928 – 11 November 1928

=== Posts, Telegraphs and Telephones ===
- Louis Germain-Martin : 3 November 1929 – 21 February 1930
- Julien Durand : 21 February 1930 – 2 March 1930
- André Mallarmé : 2 March 1930 – 13 December 1930
- Georges Bonnet : 13 December 1930 – 27 January 1931
- Charles Guernier : 27 January 1931 – 20 February 1932
- Louis Rollin : 20 February 1932 – 3 June 1932
- Henri Queuille : 3 June 1932 – 18 December 1932
- Laurent Eynac : 18 December 1932 – 26 October 1933
- Jean Mistler : 26 October 1933 – 30 January 1934
- Paul Bernier : 3 January 1934 – 9 February 1934
- André Mallarmé : 9 February 1934 – 8 November 1934
- Georges Mandel : 8 November 1934 – 4 June 1936
- Robert Jardillier : 4 June 1936 – 22 June 1937
- Jean-Baptiste Lebas : 22 June 1937 – 18 January 1938
- Fernand Gentin : 18 January 1938 – 13 March 1938
- Jean-Baptiste Lebas : 13 March 1938 – 10 April 1938
- Alfred Jules-Julien : 10 April 1938 – 21 March 1940
- Alfred Jules-Julien : 21 March 1940 – 16 June 1940
- André Février : 27 June 1940 – 12 July 1940
- François Piétri : 12 July 1940 – 6 September 1940
- Jean Berthelot : 6 September 1940 – 18 April 1942
- Robert Gibrat : 18 April 1942 – 18 November 1942
- Jean Bichelonne : 18 November 1942 – 20 August 1944
- Augustin Laurent : 10 September 1944 – 27 June 1945
- Eugène Thomas : 27 June 1945 – 26 January 1946
- Jean Letourneau : 26 January 1946 – 16 December 1946
- Eugène Thomas : 16 December 1946 – 22 January 1947
- Eugène Thomas : 9 May 1947 – 22 October 1947
- Eugène Thomas : 29 October 1949 – 7 February 1950
- Charles Brune : 7 February 1950 – 11 August 1951
- Joseph Laniel : 11 August 1951 – 4 October 1951
- Roger Duchet : 4 October 1951 – 20 January 1952
- Roger Duchet :20 January 1952 – 8 March 1952
- Roger Duchet : 8 March 1952 – 28 June 1953
- Pierre Ferri : 28 June 1953 – 19 June 1954
- Édouard Bonnefous : 23 February 1955 – 1 February 1956
- Eugène Thomas : 9 June 1958 – 8 January 1959
- Bernard Cornut-Gentille : 8 January 1959 – 5 February 1960
- Michel Maurice-Bokanowski : 5 February 1960 – 15 April 1962
- Jacques Marette : 15 April 1962 – 6 April 1967
- Yves Guéna : 6 April 1967 – 30 May 1968
- André Bettencourt : 30 May 1968 – 10 July 1968
- Yves Guéna : 10 July 1968 – 22 June 1969
- Robert Galley : 22 June 1969 – 6 July 1972
- Hubert Germain : 6 July 1972 – 1 March 1974
- Jean Royer : 1 March 1974 – 11 April 1974
- Hubert Germain : 11 April 1974 – 27 May 1974
- Louis Mexandeau : 22 May 1981 – 22 March 1983
- Alain Madelin : 20 March 1986 – 12 May 1988
- Paul Quilès : 12 May 1988 – 15 May 1991
- Émile Zuccarelli : 2 April 1992 – 29 March 1993
- Gérard Longuet : 29 March 1993 – 14 October 1994
- José Rossi : 17 October 1994 – 18 May 1995
- François Fillon : 18 May 1995 – 7 November 1995
- Franck Borotra : 7 November 1995 – 4 June 1997

== See also ==
- Orange S.A.
- La Poste (France)
