= Julien Durand (politician) =

French politician

Julien Auguste John Eugène Durand
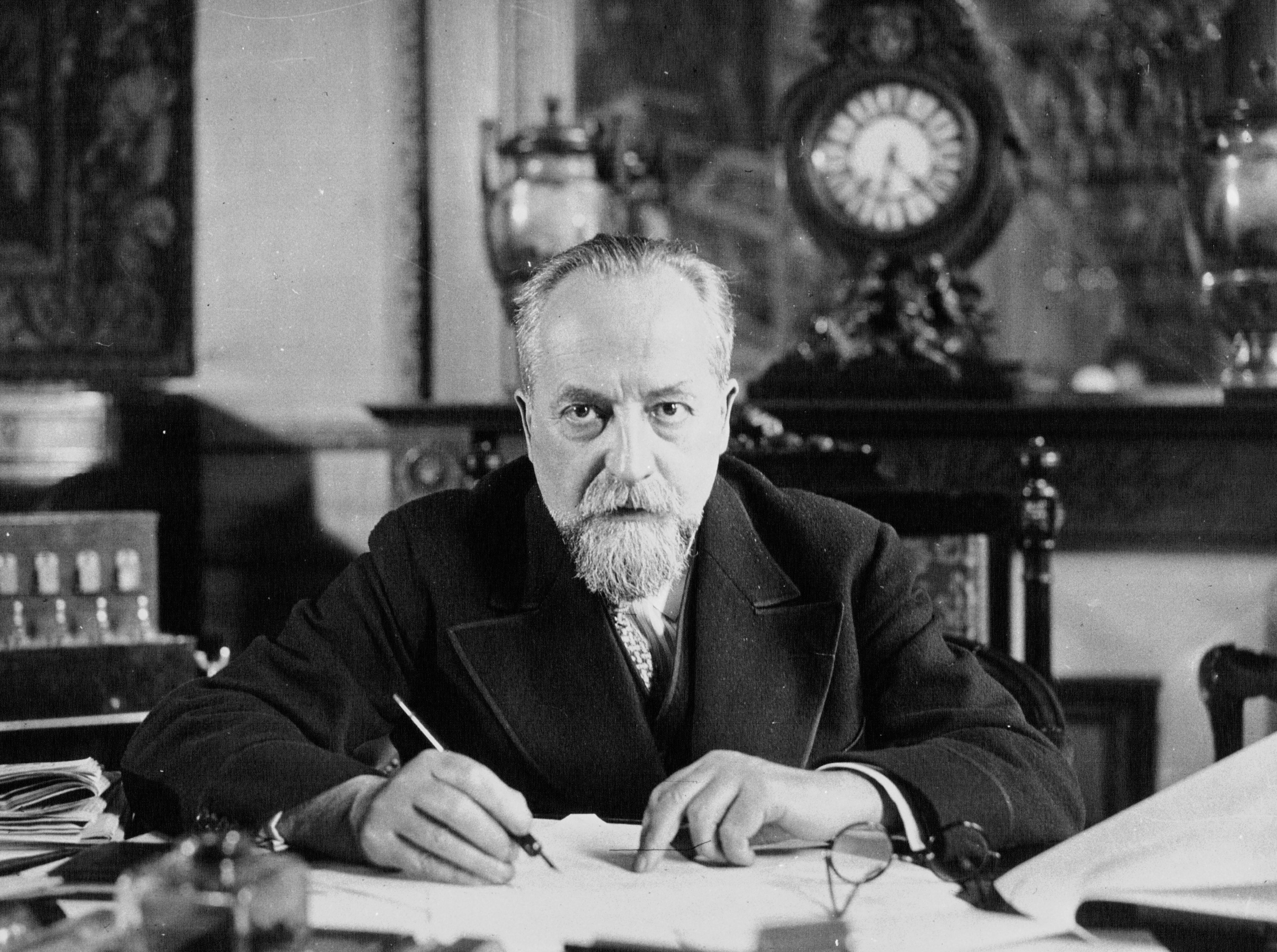
- Durand in 1932

Minister of Posts, Telegraphs, and Telephones
- In office 21 February 1930 – 2 March 1930
- Prime Minister: Camille Chautemps
- Preceded by: Louis Germain-Martin
- Succeeded by: André Mallarmé

Minister of Commerce and Industry
- In office 3 June 1932 – 30 January 1933
- Prime Minister: Édouard Herriot; Joseph Paul-Boncour
- Preceded by: Louis Rollin
- Succeeded by: Louis Serre

Personal details
- Born: 25 May 1874 Naples, Italy
- Died: 10 September 1973 (aged 99) Paris, France

Julien Auguste John Eugène Durand (25 May 1874 – 10 September 1973) was a French lawyer and Radical politician. He was briefly Minister of PTT in 1930, and was Minister of Commerce and Industry in 1932–33. He authored the first proposal for what became the 1937 International Exposition of Art and Technology in Modern Life.

== Early years ==
Julien Auguste John Eugène Durand was born on 25 May 1874 in Naples, Italy. He received his secondary education from the Marist Brothers in Besançon and then at the lycée in Brest. He studied law at the Faculty of Dijon, and in 1900 enrolled in the bar of Besançon. He later became president of the bar. He specialized in civil and commercial law. He was elected to the municipal council of Besançon in 1908. During World War I (1914–18) he served as a lieutenant with the 64th Infantry Regiment, and then at the headquarters of the 129th Infantry Division. He was awarded the Croix de Guerre.

== Political career ==
Durand ran for election to the legislature in the general elections of 16 November 1919 on the Democratic Union list, but was not successful. While still a municipal councilor for Besançon, and from 1922 a general councilor for the Doubs department, he was elected to the legislature in the general elections on 11 May 1924. He ran on the Left Cartel list, and joined the Radical and Radical Socialist group in the chamber of deputies. He joined the committees on Civil & Criminal Legislation, and Commerce & Industry. From 1926 he chaired the committee on commerce & industry. He was a Freemason, as were many French politicians in inter-war period.

Durand was reelected in the second round in the general elections of 22–29 April 1928. He joined the committees on Customs and Commerce & Industry. In December 1929 Durand submitted a proposal for a decorative arts exposition similar to the 1925 International Exposition of Modern Industrial and Decorative Arts. He said that this exposition had helped France's balance of trade, spread French taste and fostered collaboration between artists and manufacturers. However, after the Wall Street crash of 1929 there was less interest in a purely aesthetic exhibition, and more in one that focused on international cooperation.

Durand was Minister of Posts, Telegraphs, and Telephones from 21 February 1930 to 2 March 1930 in the short-lived cabinet of Camille Chautemps. In the autumn of 1930 he chaired a committee that studied the organization of a European postal union. In 1931 he was appointed to the board of the Office of Foreign Trade, while chairing the committee on commerce and industry. He was reelected in the second round in the general elections on 1–8 May 1932, and was appointed Minister of Commerce and Industry when the cabinet of Édouard Herriot was formed on 3 June 1932. Durand participated in the Lausanne conference on German reparations in June 1932. In October 1932 Durand's proposal for an exposition of the arts was combined with two others to form the basis for the 1937 Exposition Internationale des Arts et Techniques dans la Vie Moderne. Durand retained his ministry in the cabinet of Joseph Paul-Boncour from 18 December 1932 until its fall on 28 January 1933.

== Later career ==
Durand was defeated in the April–May 1936 general elections. He was appointed to the Paris Court of Appeal, and was president of the court when he retired in 1941. Julien Durand died in Paris on 10 September 1973 at the age of 99. He was a commander of the Legion of Honour.

== Publications ==
- Durand, Julien (1931). La crise économique. Comité exécutif du Parti républicain radical et radical-socialiste. p. 22.
- Durand, Julien (1934). L'action de la politique radicale sur le commerce et l'industrie. impr. Boisvent. p. 32.
- Durand, Julien (1938). Commerce extérieur, nécessité nationale (in French). Paris: Libr. générale de droit et de jurisprudence impr. H. Jéhan. p. 236.
- Durand, Julien (1938). preface. Les rapports économiques Franco-Suisses depuis la guerre. By Rusterholz, René (in French). Bordeaux: Lib.Delmas.
- Durand, Julien (1938). Le Bilan du commerce extérieur de la France en 1937 et ses enseignements, conférence faite à l'assemblée générale de la section du Nord, le 11 février 1938. Paul Jourdain, preface. Editions de "L'Observateur. p. 34.
- Durand, Julien (1939). Manuel pratique du commerce extérieur de la France pendant les hostilités. Fernand Gentin, preface. Comité national des conseillers du commerce extérieur de la France. p. 173.
- Durand, Julien (1951). Le commerce extérieur de la France en 1950: conséquences et perspectives (in French). Jules Julien, preface. Paris: Librairie générale de droit et de jurisprudence impr. F. Boisseau. p. 74.
- Durand, Julien (1952). La grève (in French). Paris: Librairie générale de droit et de jurisprudence. p. 45.
- Durand, Julien (1960). Le Nouveau régime de la faillite et du règlement judiciaire. impr. Lahure. p. 32.

== Sources ==
- Chevallier, Pierre (1975-01-15). Histoire de la Franc-Maçonnerie française: La Maçonnerie, Eglise de la République (1877–1944). Fayard. ISBN 978-2-213-65015-9.
- Duroselle, Jean-Baptiste (2013-10-18). France and the Nazi Threat: The Collapse of French Diplomacy 1932–1939. Enigma Books. ISBN 978-1-929631-15-5.
- Jolly, Jean (1960–1977). "Durand (Julien Auguste John Eugene)". Dictionnaire des parlementaires français (1889–1940). Paris: Presses universitaires de France. ISBN 2-1100-1998-0.
- "Julien, Auguste, John, Eugène DURAND" (in French). Assemblée nationale.
- Junyk, Ihor (2013-06-17). Foreign Modernism: Cosmopolitanism, Identity, and Style in Paris. University of Toronto Press. ISBN 978-1-4426-6202-5.
- Laborie, Léonard (2010). L'Europe mise en réseaux: la France et la coopération internationale dans les postes et les télécommunications (années 1850-années 1950) (in French). Peter Lang. ISBN 978-90-5201-679-5.
- Peer, Shanny (1998-02-26). France on Display: Peasants, Provincials, and Folklore in the 1937 Paris World's Fair. SUNY Press. ISBN 978-0-7914-3710-0.
