= Mallarmé =

Mallarmé is a surname. Notable people with the surname include:

- André Mallarmé (1877–1956), French politician
- Stéphane Mallarmé (1842–1898), French poet and critic
- François-René-Auguste Mallarmé (1755–1835), politician during the French Revolution
