= Léon Martinaud-Déplat =

French politician

Léon Jean Martinaud-Déplat
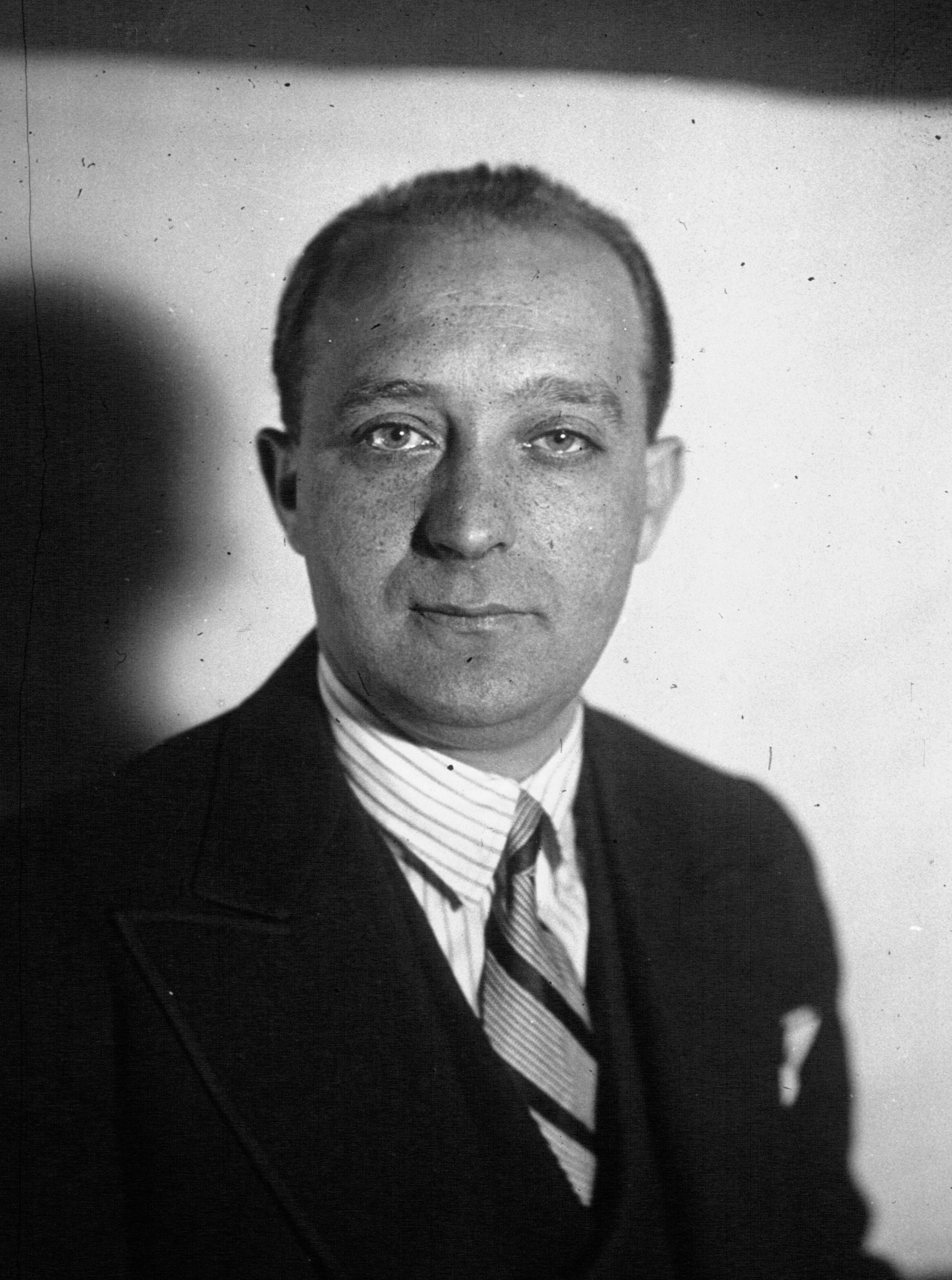
- Martinaud-Déplat in 1932

Minister of Justice
- In office 20 January 1952 – 28 June 1953
- Prime Minister: Edgar Faure; Antoine Pinay; René Mayer
- Preceded by: Edgar Faure
- Succeeded by: Paul Ribeyre

Minister of the Interior
- In office 28 June 1953 – 19 June 1954
- Prime Minister: Joseph Laniel
- Preceded by: Charles Brune
- Succeeded by: François Mitterrand

Personal details
- Born: Lyon, France
- Died: Paris, France
- Occupation: Lawyer

Léon Jean Martinaud-Déplat (9 August 1899 – 5 October 1969) was a French lawyer and Radical politician who was a deputy in 1932–36 and in 1951–56. He was Minister of Justice in 1952–53 and then Minister of the Interior in 1953–54. He was violently anti-communist, and was opposed to granting autonomy or independence of the North African colonies. His hard-line views caused him to be expelled from his party in 1955, and he failed to be reelected the next year.

== Early years ==
Léon Jean Martinaud-Déplat was born in Lyon on 9 August 1899, the son of a teacher. His surname combines the surnames of his stepfather and his father. After his secondary education in Lyon he enrolled in the Faculty of Law in Aix-en-Provence, where he obtained his license. He then joined the Paris Bar. He was president of the association of young advocates in 1925–26. He joined the Radical party, and in 1929 was appointed secretary-general of the executive committee of the Radical-Socialist Party. He was counted among the "young Turks" of the party.

== Pre-war politics ==
Martinaud-Déplat was a deputy from 8 April 1932 to 31 May 1936, elected on the Radical Republican and Radical Socialist list. He won by a narrow margin in the second round of voting for the 2nd district of the 19th arrondissement of Paris. He joined the committees on Algeria, Colonies & Protectorate and on Commerce & Industry. On 30 January 1934 he was appointed under-secretary of state for the President of the Council in the short-lived cabinet of Édouard Daladier, which resigned on 6 February 1934. He ran for reelection in 1936 but was defeated. However, he remained among the party leaders. At the start of World War II (1939–45) he was appointed press director in the High Commission of Information headed by Jean Giraudoux. He retired from politics in 1940 during the German occupation of France.

== Post-war politics ==
After the Liberation of France Martinaud-Déplat worked to reorganize the Radical Party along the lines defined by Édouard Herriot. At the 34th congress of the party in Paris in July 1945 he defended private enterprise against excessive intervention by the state. He edited La Dépêche de Paris, the official journal of the Radical Party, then in 1947 edited the L'Information radicale socialiste, a journal funded by Émile Roche. In December 1948 he succeeded Henri Queuille as administrative secretary of the Radical Party. As effective leader of the party he committed it to playing a permanent role in government. He persistently demanded a return to the pre-war electoral system, opposed government interference in business and was violently anti-communist.

Martinaud-Déplat was a deputy from 17 June 1951 to 1 December 1955 for Bouches-du-Rhône, again on the Radical Republican and Radical Socialist list. He was appointed to the committees on Foreign Affairs and on Shipping. He joined the cabinet of Edgar Faure as Minister of Justice when it was formed on 17 January 1952. He retained this office under Antoine Pinay and René Mayer, leaving office on 28 June 1953. Martinaud-Déplat told the attorneys general to treat the activities of communists with great severity. He joined with the Minister of the Interior, Charles Brune, to invent charges against Jacques Duclos.

After the fall of the Mayer cabinet Martinaud-Déplat was appointed to the cabinet of Joseph Laniel as Minister of the Interior on 28 June 1953. While he held that position there was a wave of strikes in the summer of 1953 and violent demonstrations in Paris on 14 July 1953, 15 December 1953 and 4 April 1954. He played a key role in the deposition of Sultan Mohammed V of Morocco on 20 August 1953, in which he acted with General Augustin Guillaume and Georges Bidault without obtaining the full agreement of Laniel or his cabinet. Martinaud-Déplat was the main spokesman for the North African Lobby in the Assembly. He advocated the colonial policies that were implemented by Bidault and Maurice Schumann. These allowed some control over internal administration but no authority over foreign policy and no right to leave the French union. He left office on 19 June 1954.

Martinaud-Déplat considered that Algerians were French citizens, with the same rights as every other citizen of metropolitan France. He said in 1954 that "we must put an end to the misery and exploitation that North Africans suffer." He opposed the proposal by Pierre Mendès France, head of the new government and also a Radical Party member, to give internal autonomy to Tunisia. In May 1955 the neo-Radical supporters of the North African lobby lost power in the Radical Party, until then the main party supporting French North Africa. Martinaud-Déplat lost his position as administrative president. He was expelled from the party. On 8 July 1955 he was among the 44 stubborn supporters of colonial rule who voted against the 2 June 1955 convention that gave internal autonomy to Tunisia.

Martinaud-Déplat ran as an independent on 2 January 1956 but failed to be reelected. He returned to his career as a lawyer, and was mayor of Saint-Antonin-sur-Bayon until his death on 5 October 1969.

== Sources ==
- Collectif (2005). "Martinaud-Déplat (Léon Jean)". Dictionnaire des parlementaires français de 1940 à 1958 (in French). Vol. 5. L-O. Paris: La documentation française. ISBN 2-11-005990-7.
- Irving, R. E. M. (23 March 2010). Christian Democracy in France (Routledge Revivals). Routledge. ISBN 978-1-136-95540-2.
- Jenkins, Brian; Millington, Chris (24 March 2015). France and Fascism: February 1934 and the Dynamics of Political Crisis. Taylor & Francis. ISBN 978-1-317-50724-6.
- Jolly, Jean (1960–1977). "Martinaud-Déplat (Léon Jean)". Dictionnaire des parlementaires français; notices biographiques sur les ministres, députés et sénateurs français de 1889 à 1940 (in French). Paris: Presses universitaires de France. ISBN 2-1100-1998-0.
- Kahler, Miles (14 July 2014). Decolonization in Britain and France: The Domestic Consequences of International Relations. Princeton University Press. ISBN 978-1-4008-5558-2.
- "Léon, Jean Martinaud-Déplat" (in French). Assemblée nationale.
- Lyons, Amelia (13 November 2013). The Civilizing Mission in the Metropole: Algerian Families and the French Welfare State during Decolonization. Stanford University Press. ISBN 978-0-8047-8714-7.
- Thomas, Martin; Moore, Bob; Butler, L. J. (23 April 2015). Crises of Empire: Decolonization and Europe's Imperial States. Bloomsbury Publishing. ISBN 978-1-4725-3121-6.
