= Antoine Pinay =

70th Prime Minister of France

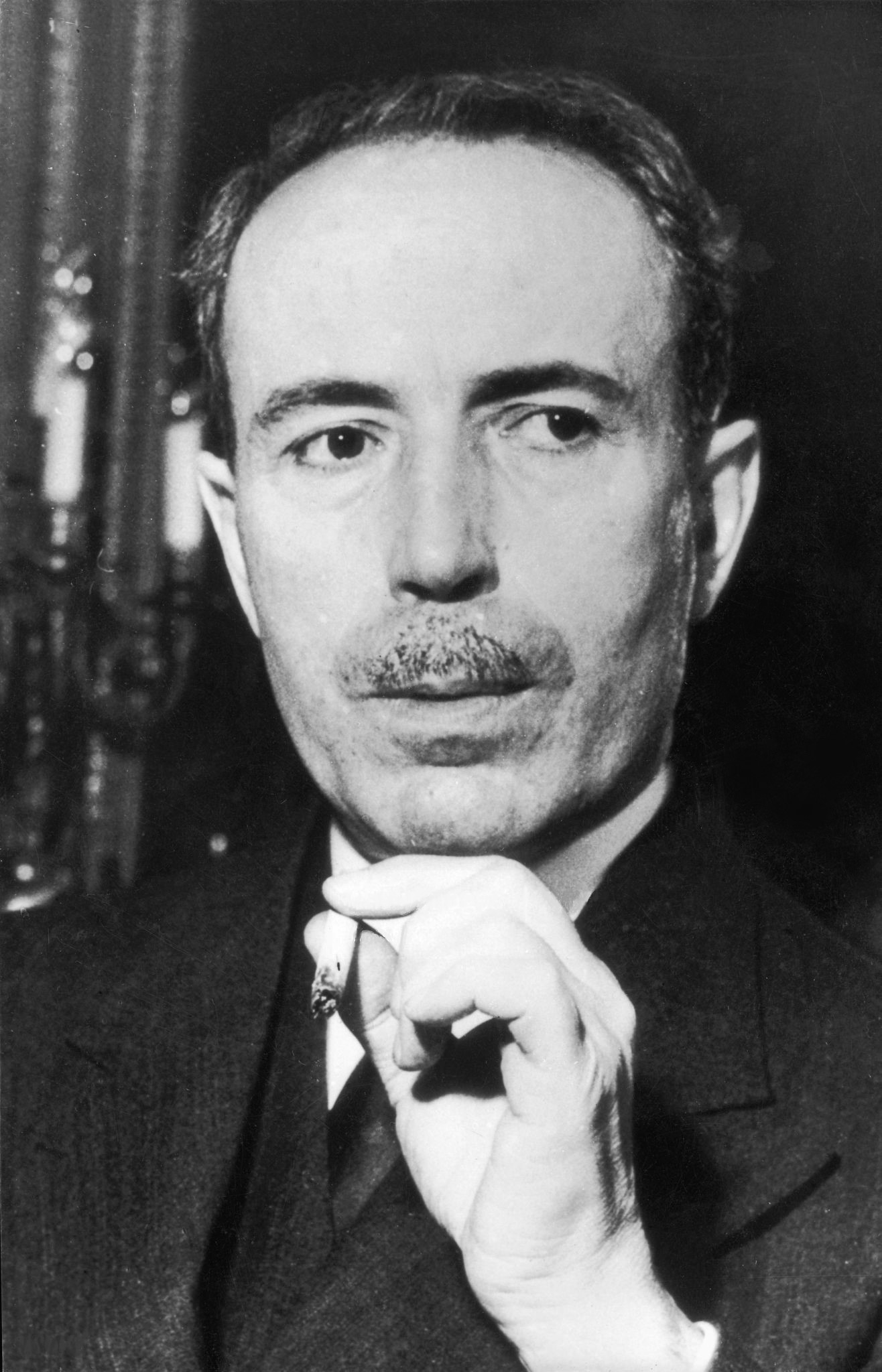
- Pinay in 1952

Prime Minister of France
- In office 8 March 1952 – 8 January 1953
- President: Vincent Auriol
- Preceded by: Edgar Faure
- Succeeded by: René Mayer

Ombudsman of France
- In office 1973–1974
- Preceded by: Position established
- Succeeded by: Aimé Paquet

Personal details
- Born: 30 December 1891 Saint-Symphorien-sur-Coise, France
- Died: 13 December 1994 (aged 102) Saint-Chamond, France
- Party: Democratic Alliance (1936–1938); Democratic and Radical Union (1938–1940); Independent Radicals (1940–1949); Independent (1940–1949); National Centre of Independents and Peasants (1949–1962)

Antoine Pinay (French: [ɑ̃twan pinɛ]; 30 December 1891 – 13 December 1994) was a French conservative politician who served as Prime Minister of France from 1952 to 1953 and French Foreign Minister from 1955 to 1956.

== Life ==
Antoine Pinay was born on 30 December 1891 in Saint-Symphorien-sur-Coise. He was a child of Claude Pinay (5 July 1852 – 4 March 1919), and his wife, Marie Antoinette Besson (10 October 1861 – 23 November 1936).

On 25 April 1917, Pinay married Marguerite Fouletier (3 June 1895 – 3 December 1970) and had two daughters and one son, Geneviève (1918–2017), Odette (1920–2015), and Pierre (1922–1964).

As a young man, Pinay fought in World War I and injured his arm so that it was paralyzed for the rest of his life.

After the war, he managed a small business and in 1929 he was elected mayor of Saint-Chamond, Loire.

He was elected to the Chamber of Deputies in 1936, running as an independent candidate opposed to the Popular Front. In 1938 he was elected to the Senate, where he joined the Independent Radicals. On 10 July 1940 he voted to give the Cabinet presided over by Marshal Philippe Pétain authority to draw up a new constitution, effectively ending the French Third Republic and establishing Vichy France. In 1941, Antoine Pinay was appointed to the Conseil National of the Vichy regime. He was also awarded the Order of the Francisque. During the occupation, Antoine Pinay remained mayor of Saint-Chamond, although he had been urged by General Georges to move to Algiers, in order to better protect the residents of this city. Pinay resigned from the Conseil National within a few months and refused any official position with the Vichy regime, such as the préfecture de l'Hérault offered by Laval. He also gave several hundreds of identity papers to help Jews and members of the Resistance flee from France to Algiers or Switzerland. An official commission in 1946 recognized his long lasting opposition to the Nazis and the help he gave to the Resistance and released him without charge.

In 1944, he was first placed on house arrest, and stripped of his right to be candidate to an election on 5 September 1945. After the intervention of René Cassin, the vice-president of the Conseil d'État, who pointed to his fierce opposition to the German occupation, his citizen rights were restored on 5 October 1945. On 2 June 1946, he could successfully run for election to the Assemblée Constituante as a moderate candidate.

He helped create a conservative party, the National Center of Independents and Peasants (CNIP). He acquired the reputation as one of France's more spirited politicians and in 1952 became prime minister by virtue of being the most popular elected CNIP official. His ministry was seen as the return of the "classical right", discredited since the Liberation. He stabilized the finances of the French nation and the French currency.

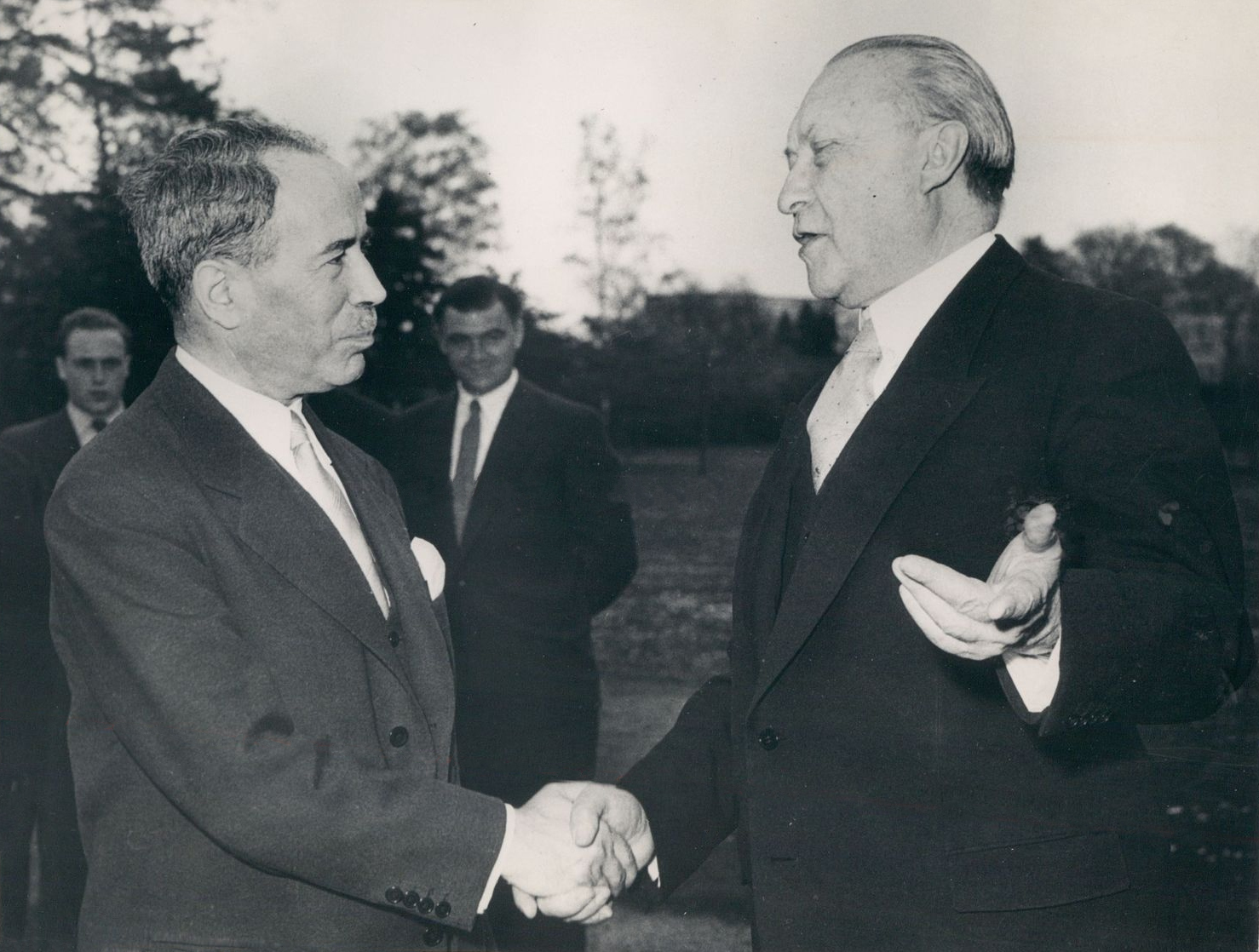
Antoine Pinay with then German Chancellor Konrad Adenauer in 1955

In 1952/53 he was one of the founders of Le Cercle Pinay, a secret invitation-only foreign policy forum for conservatives. In 1955, he was one of the participants of the Messina Conference, which would lead to the Treaty of Rome in 1957.

During the May 1958 crisis precipitated by the Algerian war, he supported Charles de Gaulle's return to power and approved of the Fifth Republic's constitution. He served as finance minister until 1960. In 1973, he was made médiateur de la République (ombudsman) by President Georges Pompidou.

Having died aged 102 years, 348 days, he is the fourth longest lived national state leader in modern history, behind only Chau Sen Cocsal Chhum and Celâl Bayar, and Guillermo Rodriguez. He died 17 days before his 103rd birthday, and was buried in Saint-Symphorien-sur-Coise. From 14 December 1990, when former Republic of China Premier Zhang Qun died until his own death, Pinay was the world's oldest living former head of government.

== Pinay's ministry, 8 March 1952 – 8 January 1953 ==
- Antoine Pinay – President of the Council and Minister of Finance and Economic Affairs
- Henri Queuille – Vice President of the Council
- Robert Schuman – Minister of Foreign Affairs
- René Pleven – Minister of National Defense
- Charles Brune – Minister of the Interior
- Jean-Marie Louvel – Minister of Commerce and Energy
- Pierre Garet – Minister of Labour and Social Security
- Léon Martinaud-Deplat – Minister of Justice
- Pierre-Olivier Lapie – Minister of National Education
- Emmanuel Temple – Minister of Veterans and War Victims
- Camille Laurens – Minister of Agriculture
- Pierre Pflimlin – Minister of Overseas France
- André Morice – Minister of Public Works, Transport, and Tourism
- Paul Ribeyre – Minister of Public Health and Population
- Eugène Claudius-Petit – Minister of Reconstruction and Town Planning
- Roger Duchet – Minister of Posts
- Jean Letourneau – Minister of Relations with Partner States

Changes

- 11 August 1952 – André Marie succeeds Lapie as Minister of National Education.

Political offices
Preceded by Maurice Bourgès-Maunoury	Minister of Public Works, Transport, and Tourism; 1950–1952	Succeeded by André Morice
Preceded by Edgar Faure	Prime Minister of France; 1952–1953	Succeeded by René Mayer
Preceded by Robert Buron	Minister of Finance and Economic Affairs; 1952–1953	Succeeded by Maurice Bourgès-Maunoury
Preceded by Edgar Faure	Minister of Foreign Affairs; 1955–1956	Succeeded by Christian Pineau
Preceded by Edgar Faure	Minister of Finance and Economic Affairs; 1958–1960	Succeeded by Wilfrid Baumgartner
Preceded by Édouard Bonnefous	interim Minister of Public Works, Transport, and Tourism; 1958	Succeeded by Robert Buron
Records
Preceded by Naruhiko Higashikuni	Oldest living state leader 20 January 1990 – 13 December 1994	Succeeded by Morarji Desai

== Honours and awards ==
- Médaille militaire
- Croix de Guerre 1914-1918
- 1914–1918 Inter-Allied Victory medal
- 1914–1918 Commemorative war medal
- Order of the Francisque
- Honour medal of railroads
- Grand Cross of the Order of Isabella the Catholic
- Grand Cross of the Order of the Dannebrog
