= Bernard Cornut-Gentille =

French administrator and politician

Minister of Posts
- In office 1959–1960
- President: Charles de Gaulle
- Prime Minister: Michel Debré
- Preceded by: Eugène Thomas
- Succeeded by: Michel Maurice-Bokanowski

Subprefect of Riems
- In office 1943-1945

High Commissioner in French Equatorial Africa
- In office 1948-1951

High Commissioner in French West Africa
- In office 1951-1956

French permanent representative to the United Nations Security Council
- In office 1956-1957

French ambassador to Argentina
- In office 1957

Minister Without Portfolio
- In office June 1, 1958-June 3, 1958

Minister of Overseas France
- In office June 3, 1958-January, 1959

Member of the French National Assembly, Gaullist Party
- In office 1958-1968

Mayor of Cannes
- In office 1959-1978

Member of the French National Assembly, non-inscrit
- In office 1973-1978

Prefect of Ille-et-Vilaine
- In office 1945-1948

Personal details
- Born: 26 July 1909 Brest, France
- Died: 21 January 1992 (aged 82) Paris, France
- Party: Union for the New Republic
- Education: École Libre des Sciences Politiques

Bernard Cornut-Gentille (26 July 1909 – 21 January 1992) was a French administrator and politician.

Born in Brest, Finistère, Cornut-Gentille studied at the École Libre des Sciences Politiques. In 1943 he was appointed as the Subprefect of Reims, but resigned to assist the Free French delegate Émile Bollaert. Following the Liberation of France he served as Prefect of Ille-et-Vilaine, of the Somme, and of the Bas-Rhin. In 1948 he was appointed High Commissioner in French Equatorial Africa then, from 1951 to 1956, High Commissioner in French West Africa.

After this, he served as France's permanent representative to the United Nations Security Council, and in 1957 as ambassador to Argentina.

Standing for the Gaullist Party, the UNR, he was elected to represent Alpes-Maritimes in the 1958 election to the National Assembly of France. He had been minister without portfolio in June 1958, then Minister of Overseas France from 3 June 1958 to 8 January 1959 in the governments of Charles de Gaulle. Under Michel Debré he served as Minister of Posts, Telegraphs, and Telephones from 8 January 1959 to 5 February 1960. He resigned ministerial office at the same time as Jacques Soustelle, over the handling of the affair of the barricades in Algiers and broke with the Gaullists.

He sat in the National Assembly as an independent (French: non-inscrit) until 1968 and again from 1973 to 1978. Locally, he served as mayor of Cannes from 1959 to 1978. Here he initiated a programme of redevelopment and renovation.

His nephew François Cornut-Gentille has served as representative of the Haute-Marne department since 1993 and mayor of Saint-Dizier since 1995.

== Honors and awards ==
- Commander of the Order of Legion of Honour
- Resistance Medal
