= Minister of Reconstruction and Urban Development =

The Minister of Reconstruction and Urban Development (French: Ministre de la Reconstruction et de l'Urbanisme) was a French cabinet position established after World War II (1939–1945).

== Officeholders ==
| Start | End | Office holder | Title |
|---|---|---|---|
| 16 November 1944 | 20 January 1946 | Raoul Dautry | Ministre de la Reconstruction et de l'Urbanisme |
| 26 January 1946 | 28 November 1946 | François Billoux | |
| 16 December 1946 | 16 January 1947 | René Schmitt | Sous-secrétaire d'État à la Reconstruction |
| 22 January 1947 | 4 May 1947 | Charles Tillon | |
| 4 May 1947 | 9 May 1947 | Jules Moch | (Interim) |
| 9 May 1947 | 19 November 1947 | Jean Letourneau | Ministre, then Secrétaire d'État à la Reconstruction et à l'Urbanisme from 31 October 1947 |
| 24 November 1947 | 7 September 1948 | René Coty | |
| 11 September 1948 | 7 January 1953 | Eugène Claudius-Petit | |
| 8 January 1953 | 21 May 1953 | Pierre Courant | |
| 28 June 1953 | 5 February 1955 | Maurice LeMayre | Ministre de la Reconstruction et du Logement, then Ministre du Logement et de la Reconstruction |
| 23 February 1955 | 24 January 1956 | Roger Duchet | Ministre de la Reconstruction et du Logement |
| 1 February 1956 | 21 May 1957 | Pierre de Félice | Secrétaire d'État à la Reconstruction et au Logement |
| 17 June 1957 | 30 September 1957 | Bernard Chochoy | Secrétaire d'État à la Reconstruction et au Logement |
| 6 November 1957 | 28 May 1958 | Pierre Garet | Ministre de la Reconstruction et du Logement |

== Sources ==
- "Charles, Joseph TILLON". Base de données des députés français depuis 1789. French National Assembly.
- "Raoul François DAUTRY (1880-1951)". Les Annales des Mines.
