= Pierre Ferri =

French politician

Minister of Posts, Telegraphs, and Telephones
- In office 28 June 1953 – 19 June 1954
- Preceded by: Roger Duchet
- Succeeded by: Édouard Bonnefous

Personal details
- Born: 3 September 1904 Paris, France
- Died: 23 November 1993 (aged 89) Paris, France
- Occupation: Stockbroker, politician

Pierre Ferri (3 September 1904 – 23 November 1993) was a French stockbroker and conservative politician who was Minister of Posts, Telegraphs, and Telephones in 1953–54.

== Early years (1904–45) ==
Pierre Ferri was born in Paris on 3 September 1904. His father was Louis Ferri, a stockbroker. Pierre Ferri obtained a degree in Law, and graduated from the Ecole libre des sciences politiques (Free School of Political Science). He then became a stockbroker. He was mobilized in 1939 at the outbreak of World War II (1939–45) and participated in the fighting in France. He fought again in 1944 and 1945. He was awarded the Croix de guerre 1939–1945 and was made a Knight of the Legion of Honour.

== Political career (1945–55) ==
Pierre Ferri was a Gaullist who leaned towards the right. In the elections for the first Constituent Assembly on 21 October 1945, he ran for the 2nd district of the Seine on the platform of the Union républicaine nationale démocratique (National Democratic Republican Union) but was not elected. He ran again in the 2 June 1946 elections for the second Constituent Assembly for the Parti républicain de la liberté (PRL, Republican Party of Liberty) but was not elected. In the parliamentary elections of 10 November 1946, Ferri again failed to win a seat.

Ferri was a member of the national council of the Rassemblement du peuple français (RPF, Rally of the French People), a coalition that included the PRL. In November 1947, Ferri was elected municipal councillor of Paris and general counsel of the Seine on the PRL platform. He was one of nine PRL councilors. From 1947, he was chairman of the Budget Committee of the city of Paris, and from 1950 was deputy chairman of the city council. In 1950 Ferri was a committee member of Les Bibliophiles de France.

Ferri ran successfully for election to the legislature for the 2nd district of the Seine on 17 June 1951 on the RPF platform. In 1951, Ferri supported Henri Ulver and several other Gaullist deputies in proposing a law to restore various powers to the Paris municipal council that had been removed, and to make some changes to the way its assemblies functioned. In 1953, there were just 27 RPF members on the council, including Ferri. Ferri was reelected in the Paris municipal elections of the Spring of 1953, one of a number of deputies to also sit on the council, but resigned soon after.

In the legislature, Ferri sat on the Finance Committee and on the subcommittee that monitored spending on national defence. He submitted many bills or amendments related to financial issues. On 28 June 1953, he joined the cabinet of Joseph Laniel as Minister of PTT. The cabinet fell on 12 June 1954, and Ferri again sat on the Finance committee. In the elections of 2 January 1956, Ferri was not reelected. He was again elected to the legislature in November 1958 as a member for Paris's 22nd constituency. Ferri was elected deputy for the Plaine Monceaux in the 17th arrondissement, running against a Gaullist Union for the New Republic candidate. He held his seat until 1962.

In 1966, Ferri was president of the Paris regional federation of the Independent Republicans led by Valéry Giscard d'Estaing. Jacques Feron, another former deputy, was secretary-general. Pierre Ferri died in Paris on 23 November 1993, aged 89.

== Sources ==
- "AVIS". Esprit. Nouvelle Série (in French). 271 (3). Editions Esprit: 544. March 1959. JSTOR 24255548.
- collectif (2001). "Pierre FERRI". Dictionnaire des parlementaires français de 1940 à 1958 (in French). Vol. 4. E-K. Paris: La Documentation française.
- Kessler, Marie-Christine (October 1966). "M. VALERY GISCARD D'ESTAING ET LES REPUBLICAINS INDEPENDANTS: réalités et perspectives". Revue Française de Science Politique (in French). 16 (5). Sciences Po University Press: 940–957. doi:10.3406/rfsp.1966.392964. JSTOR 43115027.
- Les Bibliophiles de France (1950). LA CELESTINE: Tragi-comédie de Calixte et Mélibée. La Belle Feuille. GGKEY:14NYPYNBAXG.
- Nivet, Philippe (1994). Le Conseil municipal de Paris de 1944 à 1977. Publications de la Sorbonne. ISBN 978-2-85944-244-6.
