= Eugène Thomas =

French politician (1903–1969)

Minister of Posts, Telegraphs, and Telephones
- In office 27 June 1945 – 26 January 1946
- Prime Minister: Charles de Gaulle
- Preceded by: Augustin Laurent
- Succeeded by: Jean Letourneau

Minister of Posts, Telegraphs, and Telephones
- In office 16 December 1946 – 22 October 1947
- Prime Minister: Léon Blum; Paul Ramadier
- Preceded by: Jean Letourneau

Minister of Posts, Telegraphs, and Telephones
- In office 28 October 1949 – 7 February 1950
- Prime Minister: Georges Bidault
- Succeeded by: Charles Brune

Minister of Posts, Telegraphs, and Telephones
- In office 9 June 1958 – 8 January 1959
- Prime Minister: Charles de Gaulle
- Preceded by: Édouard Bonnefous
- Succeeded by: Bernard Cornut-Gentille

Personal details
- Born: 23 July 1903 Vieux-Condé, Nord, France
- Died: 29 January 1969 (aged 65) Le Quesnoy, Nord, France
- Party: SFIO

Eugène Thomas (French pronunciation: [øʒɛn tɔma]; 23 July 1903 – 29 January 1969) was a French socialist teacher, trade unionist and politician. He was a member of the French Resistance during World War II (1939–45). He was Minister or Secretary of State for PTT four times in the post-war period.

== Early years (1903–39) ==
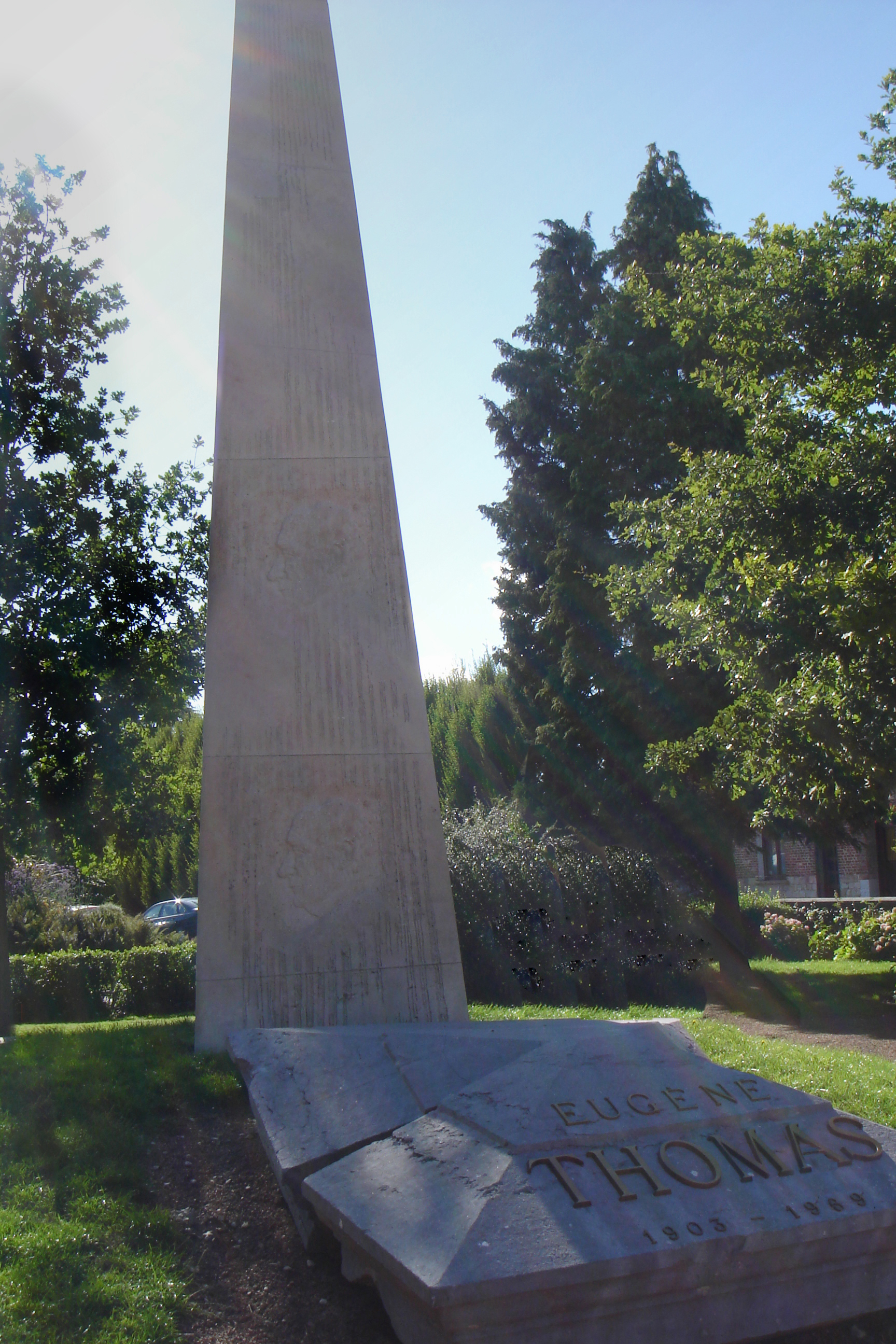
Monument to Thomas in Le Quesnoy

Eugène Thomas was born on 23 July 1903 in Vieux-Condé, Nord. His father was a customs officer. He was one of a family of six children, Thomas attended the normal school at Douai where he gained a higher certificate. He was appointed a teacher in Louvignies-Quesnoy. He was a militant trade unionist, and became secretary-general of the north section of the National Union of Teachers. He married Celine Quinchon, born on 3 May 1911 in Rieux-en-Cambrésis and also a teacher.

In the general elections of May 1936 Thomas ran for the Socialist Party in the 3rd district of Avesnes and was elected in the second round. He was deputy from 3 May 1936 to 31 May 1942. (Note: A decree of July 1939 extended the mandate of deputies elected in May 1936 until 31 May 1942. During World War II Thomas was unable to function as a deputy since he was an escaped prisoner of war.) He joined the Popular Front in the Chamber of Deputies. He sat on the committee on Algeria, colonies and protectorates, on the Alsace-Lorraine committee and on the committee on Customs and Trade Agreements. He was elected councilor-general of Nord in 1937.

== World War II (1939–45) ==
Thomas volunteered at the outbreak of World War II in 1939 and was assigned to the 5th North African Infantry Division as a 2nd lieutenant. In 1940 he participated in the campaign in Belgium and on the Somme, and was taken prisoner near Boulogne-sur-Mer in June 1940. He was unable to participate in the Congress of Vichy on 10 July 1940, and later showed his hostility to the Vichy regime. He escaped in September after three months, and managed to reach the unoccupied zone. He moved to Jussat, Puy-de-Dôme, then to Labarthe-Inard, Haute-Garonne, and then in February 1941 to Saint-Martory, Haute-Garonne, where his wife was teaching.

Thomas was one of the early members of the French Resistance, and traveled widely to try to reconstitute the socialist movement. In March 1941 he was one of seven members of the Comité exécutif clandestin (Clandestine Executive Committee) of the Comité d'action socialiste (CAS, Socialist Action Committee) for the southern zone. The CAS assigned him to the Réseau Brutus (Brutus Network) in August 1941. The Vichy authorities placed him under house arrest, but in February 1943 noted they had lost track of him. He had become the national head of an information and action network named La France au combat (Fighting France). Thomas was arrested by the Gestapo during a visit to Paris in April–May 1943. He was tortured and held in Fresnes Prison for nine months, then interned in Compiègne. He was deported to Buchenwald concentration camp, where he was released by US armed forces on 11 April 1945.

== Post-war career (1945–69) ==
In April 1945 Thomas was elected mayor of Quesnoy, and then general councilor of Quesnoy-East canton. He was appointed minister of Minister of Posts, Telegraphs, and Telephones on 27 June 1945, holding office until 26 January 1946. Thomas was elected to the first National Constituent Assembly as Socialist deputy for Nord on 21 October 1945. He was reelected to the second Constituent Assembly on 2 June 1946, and was elected to the legislature on 10 November 1946 and reelected on 17 June 1951. Thomas was Secretary of State for PTT from 22 October 1947 to 28 October 1949 and Minister for PTT from 28 October 1949 to 7 February 1950. Thomas was Secretary of State for the Interior from 12 July 1950 to 11 August 1951. He lost his seat on 1 December 1955.

Thomas was reelected as Socialist deputy for Nord on 2 January 1956 and remained a deputy until 8 December 1958. He was Secretary of State for the Interior from 1 February 1956 to 14 May 1958 and was once again Minister for PTT from 9 June 1958 to 8 January 1959. He died on 29 January 1969 in Le Quesnoy, Nord.

== Sources ==
- "Eugène THOMAS" (in French). Assemblée nationale de France.
- "Eugène THOMAS – Mandats" (in French). Assemblée nationale de France.
- Jolly, Jean (1960–1977). "THOMAS (Eugène)" (PDF). Dictionnaire des parlementaires français de 1889 à 1940 (in French). Paris: Presses universitaires de France. ISBN 2-1100-1998-0.
