= Augustin Laurent =

French politician

Minister of Posts, Telegraphs, and Telephones
- In office 10 September 1944 – 27 June 1945
- Preceded by: Jean Bichelonne
- Succeeded by: Eugène Thomas

Mayor of Lille
- In office 1955–1973
- Preceded by: Guy Debeyre
- Succeeded by: Pierre Mauroy

Personal details
- Born: 6 September 1896 Wahagnies, Nord, France
- Died: 1 October 1990 (aged 94) Wasquehal, Nord, France
- Party: SFIO
- Occupation: Miner

Augustin Laurent (9 September 1896 – 1 October 1990) was a French coal miner, journalist and socialist politician. He was a national deputy both before and after World War II (1939–45). During the war he was active in the French Resistance. After the liberation of France he was Minister of Posts, Telegraphs, and Telephones in the provisional government between September 1944 and June 1945. He was active as a socialist in the post-war legislature until 1951, when he decided to focus on local politics. He was mayor of Lille from 1955 to 1973.

== Early years ==
Augustin Laurent was born on 9 September 1896 in Wahagnies, Nord, to a family of miners. He began working in the mines when he was very young. During World War I (1914–18) he fought at the front for 46 months. He was decorated with the Croix de Guerre.

Laurent became involved in the socialist movement in the Nord, and in 1931 was elected to the General Council of Nord. In the 1936 general elections he was the Popular Front candidate for the 6th district of Lille and was elected in the second round of voting. In the chamber he sat with the socialist group of the Section Française de l'Internationale Ouvrière (SFIO, French Section of the Workers' International). He was a member of the executive committee of the SFIO.

== World War II ==
Laurent was absent from Vichy on 10 July 1940 when Marshal Philippe Pétain was granted full powers, and immediately showed his hostility to the Vichy France regime. He became one of the leaders of the French Resistance. From October 1940 he wrote articles for L'Homme libre, a clandestine publication edited by his friend Jean-Baptiste Lebas, and then from the end of 1941 wrote for its successor Quatrième République. Laurent became organizing secretary in the clandestine executive committee of the Socialist Party, coordinating activity between the occupied zone and the free zone. He was almost arrested, and in 1942 moved to Lyon, where he was a member of the political committee for the Libération-Sud movement, and led the France au combat network. He often visited the north to maintain links and transmit orders and information, and also participated in editing, publishing and distributing clandestine journals. He was encouraged to represent the Socialist Party in the National Council of the Resistance, but refused since he preferred to focus on organizing the resistance in the Nord.

In January 1944 Laurent settled permanently in Lille, where he supervised the departmental committee of liberation. He moved frequently to avoid the Gestapo. When Lille was liberated Laurent and some members of the French Forces of the Interior (FFI) took possession of the offices of the prefecture in the name of the Republic. He was made head of the socialist federation of Nord. He took over the presses of the collaborationist journal Le Réveil du Nord and created Nord Matin. He was political director of Nord Matin until 1979. Due to his Resistance activity and his position in the Socialist Party he was invited by General Charles de Gaulle to take the position of Minister of Posts, Telegraphs, and Telephones in the provisional government on 10 September 1944. He became openly hostility to de Gaulle, and resigned on 27 June 1945. The ostensible reason was to recover from surgery. From 1945 Laurent was secretary of the Socialist Federation of Nord.

== Post-war career ==
In the 21 October 1945 elections for the Constituent Assembly Laurent was at the head of the Socialist SFIO list for the second district of Nord and was elected. The SFIO won three of the nine seats in the district, the Christian Democratic Mouvement Républicain Populaire (MRP, Popular Republican Movement) led by Maurice Schumann won four and the communists led by Arthur Ramette won two. Laurent voted for the nationalizations and approved the draft constitution of the French Fourth Republic on 19 April 1946. However, the constitution was rejected in the referendum of 5 May 1946. Fresh election were held for the second Constituent Assembly, and Laurent was again elected. After the new constitution was ratified by plebiscite he was elected to the National Assembly on 10 November 1946. Laurent was also elected president of the general council of Nord in 1946. He was Minister of State from 16 December 1946 to 22 January 1947 in the government of Léon Blum.

After leaving the cabinet Laurent was active in questions on social issues such as family benefits and home assistance to the elderly and disabled. He showed himself as moderate socialist in the tradition of Jules Guesde. While supporting the interests of the working classes, he was firmly anti-communist. Talking of the strikes in the Nord collieries in November 1948 he supported the claims of the miners but said the strike could have been avoided if it had been led by genuine trade-unionists instead of professional Communist Party agitators.

Laurent did not run for reelection in the elections on 17 June 1951, preferring to focus on local politics in Nord. He was elected to the Lille municipal council in 1953 and became mayor in 1955. In 1963 he resigned as secretary of the Socialist Federation of Nord, and in 1967 resigned from the SFIO executive. He left the office of mayor of Lille in 1973. He died on 1 October 1990 in Wasquehal, Nord, at the age of 94.

== Sources ==
- Barre, Michel (1984-10-24). "Nécrologie d'Augustin LAURENT". JT FR3 Nord Pas de Calais (in French).
- Jolly, Jean (1960–1977). "Augustin LAURENT". Dictionnaire des parlementaires français de 1889 à 1940 (in French). ISBN 2-1100-1998-0.
- La documentation française (2005). "Augustin LAURENT". Dictionnaire des parlementaires français de 1940 à 1958 (in French). Vol. 5. L-O. ISBN 2-11-005990-7.
