= Charles Brune (politician) =

French politician

Charles François Ernest Brune

Minister of Posts, Telegraphs, and Telephones
- In office 7 February 1950 – 11 August 1951
- Prime Minister: Georges Bidault; Henri Queuille; René Pleven; Henri Queuille
- Preceded by: Eugène Thomas
- Succeeded by: Joseph Laniel

Minister of the Interior
- In office 11 August 1951 – 28 June 1953
- Prime Minister: René Pleven; Edgar Faure; Antoine Pinay; René Mayer
- Preceded by: Henri Queuille
- Succeeded by: Léon Martinaud-Déplat

Personal details
- Born: 31 July 1891 Arbois, Jura, France
- Died: 13 January 1956 (aged 64) Paris, France
- Occupation: Veterinarian, politician

Charles François Ernest Brune (31 July 1891 – 13 January 1956) was a French veterinarian and politician who served as Minister of PTT in 1950–51 and then as Minister of the Interior in 1951–53.

== Life ==
Charles François Ernest Brune was born on 31 July 1891 in Arbois, Jura. He became a veterinary doctor. He spent his whole career in the Ministry of Agriculture. From 1935 he was municipal councilor of Chartres. In 1938 he was appointed inspector general of veterinary services. In 1946 he was elected Councilor of the Republic for Eure-et-Loir. He was president of the Rally of Left Republicans and of the Democratic Left. He was elected to the Senate for Eure-et-Loir on 8 December 1946, and was reelected on 7 November 1948 and 19 June 1955.

Brune was Minister of Posts, Telegraphs, and Telephones from 7 February 1950 to 11 August 1951. He held this post in the governments of Georges Bidault, Henri Queuille and René Pleven. He was Minister of the Interior from 11 August 1951 to 28 June 1953. He held this post in the governments of René Pleven, Edgar Faure, Antoine Pinay and René Mayer. In the Pinay government Brune and the Minister of Justice, Léon Martinaud-Déplat, were intensely anti-communist and pursued repressive policies. In 1953 Brune gave the prefect Jean Vaujour responsibility for public security in Algeria, asking him to work with Senator Henri Borgeaud (1895–1963), one of the largest French landowners in the colony and an opponent of all reforms.

Charles Brune died while still a senator on 13 January 1956 in Paris.

== Publications ==
- Charles Brune (1923), Pasteur, son œuvre 1822-1922 (in French), Besançon: Jacques et Demontrond, p. 48
- Charles Brune (1934), L'Elevage ovin dans la Sarthe (in French)
- Charles Brune (1934), La loi du 7 juillet 1933 sur la prophylaxie de la tuberculose des bovidés et les décrets du 24 janvier 1934. (in French), Chartres: Durand, p. 8.
- Charles Brune (1937), Le décret du 24 janvier 1934 et les saisies en matière de tuberculose (in French), Paris: Librairie E. Le François

== Sources ==
- "Brune, Charles" (in French). Sénat du France.
- Damian, Alain (2015-07-02). L'Algérie aux carrefours du destin: Tome II et Tome III - Des débuts de la guerre à l'agonie. Editions Publibook. ISBN 978-2-342-03940-5.
- "Les ministres de la IVème République" (in French). Ministère de l’Intérieur. 2012-07-25.
- Touret, André (2003). Montluçon après la tourmente: 1944-1977 (in French). EDITIONS CREER. ISBN 978-2-84819-008-2.
