= Édouard Bonnefous =

French politician (1907–2007)

Édouard Henri Jean Bonnefous
- Bonnefous in Paris, 1951

Minister of Commerce
- In office 20 January 1952 – 8 March 1952
- Prime Minister: Edgar Faure
- Preceded by: Pierre Pflimlin
- Succeeded by: Jean-Marie Louvel

Minister of Posts, Telegraphs and Telecommunications
- In office 23 February 1955 – 1 February 1956
- Prime Minister: Edgar Faure
- Preceded by: Pierre Ferri
- Succeeded by: Eugène Thomas

Minister of Public Works, Transport and Tourism
- In office 13 June 1957 – 1 June 1958
- Prime Minister: Maurice Bourgès-Maunoury; Félix Gaillard
- Preceded by: Édouard Corniglion-Molinier
- Succeeded by: Antoine Pinay

Personal details
- Born: 24 August 1907 Paris, France
- Died: 24 February 2007 (aged 99) Paris, France
- Occupation: Professor

Édouard Henri Jean Bonnefous (24 August 1907 – 24 February 2007) was a French politician. Before World War II (1939–45) he was active in the study of international affairs. After the war he was elected a deputy on the Rally of Left Republicans platform in 1946, and remained a deputy until 1958. He served as a minister in several cabinets, and was also active in the Council of Europe. He was a strong advocate of greater European integration. From 1959 to 1986 he was a member of the Senate, where he became a critic of General de Gaulle, and an advocate of protection of the environment.

== Early years ==
Édouard Henri Jean Bonnefous was born in Paris on 24 August 1907. He was the son of Georges Bonnefous, a former minister. He was educated in Paris at the Lycée Janson de Sailly and the École Fontanes. He obtained diplomas from the École libre des sciences politiques (Free School of Political Sciences) and the Institut des hautes études internationales (Institute of Advanced International Studies).

Before World War II (1939–45) Bonnefous was involved in political economy and foreign policy, and made various trips abroad for study purposes. He and Jean Sarrailh founded the Institut des hautes études d'Amérique latine (Institute of Advanced Latin American Studies). He was also a journalist and theater critic. In 1937 he contributed economic studies to La Journée industrielle and Le National. He was mobilized in the infantry at the start of World War II. In 1941 he joined the French Resistance. In 1944 he was a member of the departmental committee for the liberation of Seine-et-Oise. He was co-founder, with André Siegfried and Roger Seydoux, of the journal Année politique. He became a professor at the Institut des hautes études internationales.

== Deputy ==
=== Post-war Europe: 1945–48 ===
Bonnefous was a candidate for election to the National Constituent Assembly on 21 October 1945 on the "Republican Concentration" platform, but did poorly. After this he was one of the founders of the Rally of Left Republicans (Rassemblement des gauches républicaines, RGR), and was elected Deputy for Seine-et-Oise on this platform on 10 November 1946. Bonnefous was a member of the parliamentary commission of inquiry into the French zone of post-war Germany. He was not in favor of quickly returning independent power to the Germans. He wrote, "France fortunately shows more distrust towards the vanquished, even towards the repentant ones, then its allies, believing that caution is a more important consideration than the desire for a democratic reeducation of Germany."

=== European unity debates: 1948–51 ===
Bonnefous was president of the parliamentary Foreign Affairs Commission from 1948 to 1952. He was the main author of a 19 March 1948 motion calling for the government to "work for the early convening of a European Constituent Assembly". This was partly in response to signs that the Soviet Union was following an expansionist policy. Similar motions were presented in the British and Dutch parliaments. In 1948 he was French delegate to the United Nations. Bonnefous became a member of the Consultative Assembly of the Council of Europe in Strasbourg. He played an important role in the formative period of the Council of Europe.

In the opening session of the Council of Europe in August 1949 Bonnefous called for the European countries to "agree to pool their natural resources under a joint international administration." Bonnefous said, "A basic industry must be chosen as an example of how to break away from the old concepts of national borders and state sovereignty. The coal industry must obviously be selected." He also warned, "if the German revival is not integrated in the economic organization of Europe, it will be carried out against the other European countries." Bonnefous published L'Idée européenne et sa réalisation in 1950, a book on European issues.

In October 1950 Bonnefous stated, "if one does not wish German rearmament to be carried out against Europe, it is essential to integrate it in a European organization worthy of the name, for, without this, we are going to allow Germany to be reconstructed at the same time as we despair of creating Europe. He was opposed to the European Defence Community proposed in 1950 by René Pleven, the French Prime Minister. He thought it was "a threat to the very idea of Europe" and would be dominated by Germany. He said there were two opposing concepts of Europe:

For one group, Europeans such as we are and shall continue to be, Europe is a geographic reality, it is an economic, demographic, and political necessity. ... Alas, exactly the opposite is the position of those I call the empiricists. For some of them, Europe is the best means of parrying the Soviet danger, and for others ... it is the best means of rearming Germany. The European Community is in this case in danger of appearing to be not a permanent necessity, but an ephemeral and provisional creation. ... Adandon sovereignty in a true community of free nations, in a real Atlantic community, yes! In a true Europe, yes! Abandon sovereignty in the fictitious frame of a community of the Six—never!"

In August 1950 Bonnefous proposed to the Consultative Assembly of the Council of Europe that a European Transport Authority should be established, following a similar model to the European Coal and Steel Community (ECSC). The new authority would be a supranational body authorized and funded to undertake projects at a European level that would lead to a common European transport system, and to finance works such as tunnels under the Strait of Gibraltar and the English Channel. The initial response was positive. He submitted a plan for the authority on 24 January 1951. This ran into resistance from Britain and the Scandinavian countries, and a much less ambititious European Transport Office was eventually proposed.

=== French politics: 1951–55 ===
Bonnefous was reelected on 17 June 1951 under a system of proportional representation in which the Communists won three seats in the 2nd district of Seine-et-Oise, the Rally of the French People won two seats, and Bonnefous's RGR was one of four parties that won a single seat. Bonnefous was president of the Foreign Affairs Committee. He was appointed deputy member of the Consultative Assembly of the Council of Europe on 10 August 1951. Between 20 January 1952 and 8 March 1952 he was Minister of Commerce in the government of Edgar Faure. He published a second book on Europe in 1952, L'Europe face à son destin. From 8 January 1953 to 28 June 1953 he was Minister of State in the government of René Mayer. From 1953 to 1955 he was president of the parliamentary group of the Democratic and Socialist Union of the Resistance (Union démocratique et socialiste de la Résistance, UDSR). He was made honorary president of the Société d'économie politique.

=== Minister of Posts, Telegraphs and Telecommunications: 1955–56 ===
On 23 February 1955 Bonnefous was appointed Minister of Posts, Telegraphs and Telecommunications in the government of Edgar Faure, holding office until 1 February 1956. On 9 July 1955 Bonnefous gave an outline to the Consultative Assembly of the Council of Europe of the plan for a European Posts and Telecommunications organization. The plan covered exchange of information, simplification of cross-border postal arrangements, technical cooperation, European television, stamps with a common figure of Europe and shared investments. Bonnefous argued at the Quai d'Orsay and then at the Council of Europe that the scope should include the Organisation for European Economic Co-operation, Finland, Spain and Yugoslavia. The largest possible scope would gain the greatest economies of scale. At the first meetings of the ECSC subcommittee on posts and telecommunications in August–September 1955 it became clear that Belgium wanted to limit close cooperation to the six ECSC countries. The subcommittee rejected the larger membership on the grounds that it would infringe on the authority of the national governments, On 20 January 1956 the PTT ministers of the six members of the ECSC met in Paris to discuss the common arrangements. Great Britain was represented by an observer. In the end the Treaty of Rome signed on 25 March 1957 did not discuss PTT issues at all.

=== Later positions: 1956–58 ===
Bonnefous was reelected to the Chamber of Deputies on 2 January 1956 on the RGR platform, and on 2 February was again elected president of the UDSR parliamentary group. On 23 February 1956 Bonnerfous was reelected a deputy member of the Consultative Assembly of the Council of Europe. In May 1957 he was appointed vice-president of the Assembly of the European Union. On 13 June 1957 Bonnefous was appointed Minister of Public Works, Transport and Tourism in the government of Maurice Bourgès-Maunoury, and retained this post during the subsequent governments of Félix Gaillard and Pierre Pflimlin. During the crisis of May 1958 Bonnefous supported the return to power of General Charles de Gaulle. He left office when the government was dissolved on 1 June 1958. In the legislative elections of 23/30 November 1958 Bonnefous was defeated by the Gaullist candidate. He continued to head the management committee of L'année politique, and gave courses on Economic Geography at the Institut des hautes études internationales.

== Senator ==
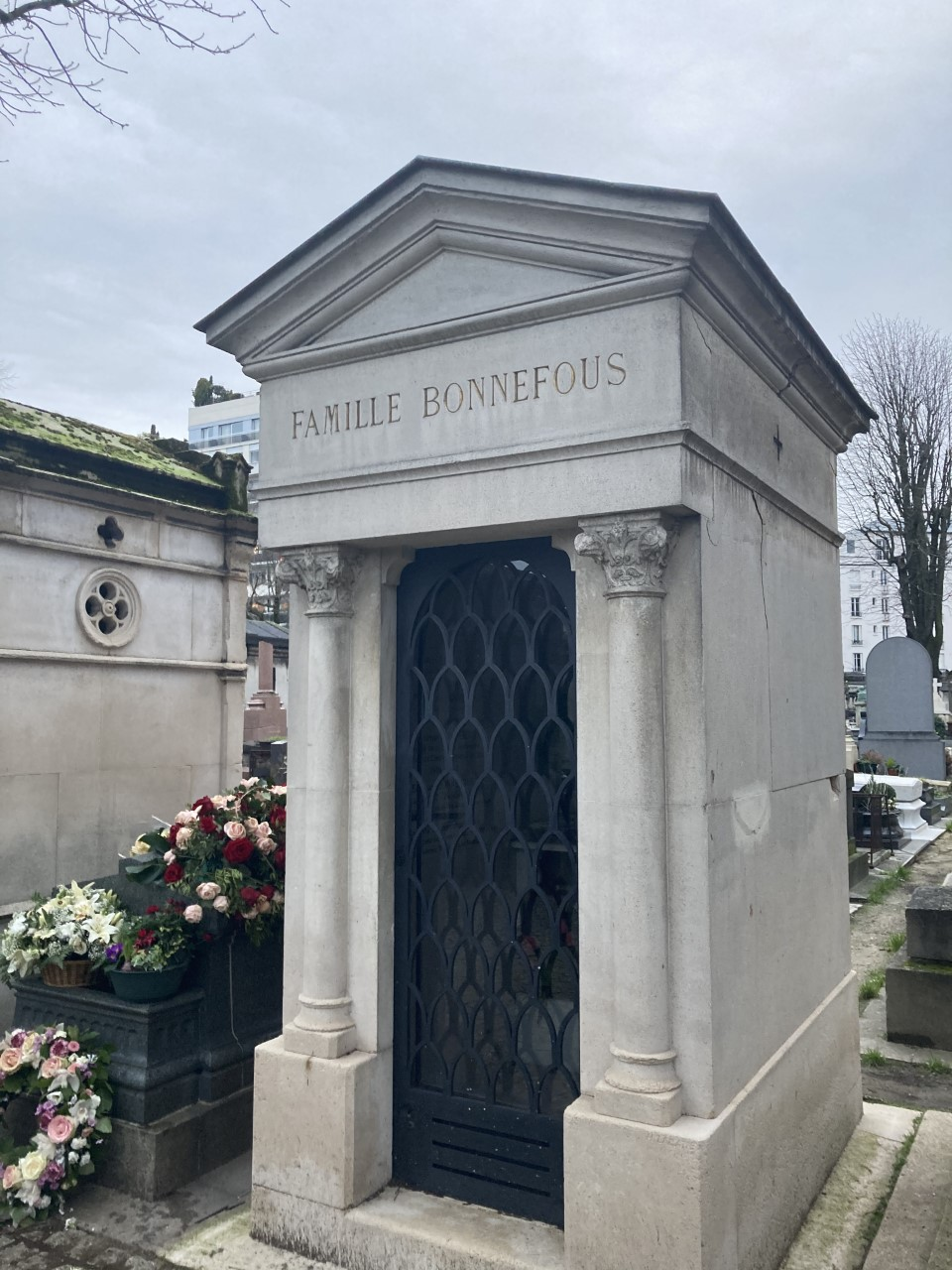
Grave in Paris.

Bonnefous was elected Senator for Seine-et-Oise on 28 April 1959. He was elected Senator for Yvelines on 22 September 1968, and was reelected for this seat on 25 September 1977. As senator he chaired the committee on Finance, Budgetary Control and National Economic Accounts. He moved toward opposition to Gaullism, criticizing de Gaulle for lack of commitment to the European Union and excessive distrust of the United States. By the 1960s he had become involved in environmental issues. His mandate in the Senate ended on 1 October 1986, when he did not run for reelection.

Édouard Bonnefous was president of the Fondation Singer-Polignac from 1985 to 2006. He died in Paris on 24 February 2007 at the age of 99.

== Publications ==
- Édouard Bonnefous (1934). Les Assemblées nationales sous la Troisième République. Société d'études et d'informations économiques. p. 20.
- Édouard Bonnefous (1950). L'Idée européenne et sa réalisation. Éditions du Grand Siécle. p. 357.
- Édouard Bonnefous (1952). L'Europe en face de son destin. Ed. du Grand Siècle. p. 386.
- Édouard Bonnefous (1953). Données politiques et économiques de l'Amérique latine: cours. Institut des hautes études internationales.
- Édouard Bonnefous (1954). Encyclopédie de l'Amérique latine. Presses Universitaires de France. p. 628.
- Georges Bonnefous; Édouard Bonnefous (1959–1967). Histoire politique de la Troisième République. Preface by André Siegfried. Presses universitaires de France.
  - L'avant-guerre (1906-1914). Vol. 1. p. 434.
  - La Grande Guerre (1914-1918). Vol. 2. p. 488.
  - L'après-guerre (1919-1924). Vol. 3. p. 462.
  - Cartel des Gauches et Union National (1924-1929). Vol. 4. p. 434.
  - La République en danger: des ligues au front populaire (1930-1936). Vol. 5.
  - Vers la guerre: Du Front populaire à la Conférence de Munich (1936-1938). Vol. 6.
  - La course vers l'abime: la fin de la III ̊République (1936-1940). Vol. 7. p. 448.
- Édouard BONNEFOUS (Professeur à l'Institut des Hautes Études Internationales.) (1958). Les Grands travaux. With illustrations, including maps. p. 150.
- Édouard Bonnefous (1958). La Réforme administrative. Presses Universitaires de France. p. 230.
- Édouard Bonnefous (1960). La terre et la faim des hommes. Librairie Arthème Fayard. p. 393.
- Édouard Bonnefous (1963). Les milliards qui s'envolent. Fayard. p. 293.
- Édouard Bonnefous (1963). Le Problème de l'aide aux pays sous-développés: cours. Institut des hautes études internationales.
- Édouard Bonnefous (1963). Les problèmes d'aménagement du territoire en Europe. Association des études internationales. p. 36.
- Les moyens d'information dans les états modernes. Institut des hautes études internationales. 1965. p. 87.
- Édouard Bonnefous (1970). L'homme ou la nature?. Éditions J'ai lu. p. 440.
- Édouard Bonnefous (1972). Comment réconcilier l'homme et la nature. Centre d'etudes politiques et civiques. p. 60.
- Édouard Bonnefous (1974). Le Monde est-il surpeulé?. Éditions J'ai lu. p. 238.
- Édouard Bonnefous (1976). Sauver l'humain. Flammarion. p. 213.
- FRANCE. Comité parlementaire économique et social; André Rossi; Édouard Bonnefous (1977). L'Aide à l'exportation. Sénat. p. 54.
- Michel Bruguière; Édouard Bonnefous (1982). Administration Et Parlement Depuis 1815. Librairie Droz. p. 128.
- Édouard Bonnefous (1984). Avant l'oubli. Laffont. p. 435. ISBN 978-2-13-048148-5.
- Édouard Bonnefous; Elisabeth Zana (2001). L'environnement en péril, Edouard Bonnefous, un précurseur. Economica. p. 110.
- Édouard Bonnefous; Pascal Binczak (2002). La construction de l'Europe: par l'un de ses initiateurs. Presses Universitaires de France - PUF. p. 205. ISBN 978-2-13-052467-0.

== Sources ==
- "BONNEFOUS Edouard" (in French). Senate of France.
- Édouard Bonnefous (in French), Fondation Singer-Polignac
- Landheer, B.; Robertson, A.H. (2013-03-09). European Yearbook. Springer. ISBN 978-94-015-3895-4.
- Lipgens, Walter; Loth, Wilfried (1988). Documents on the History of European Integration: The struggle for European Union by political parties and pressure groups in western European countries, 1945-1950. Walter de Gruyter. ISBN 978-3-11-011429-4.
- Michalis, Maria (2007-10-08). Governing European Communications: From Unification to Coordination. Lexington Books. ISBN 978-0-7391-5571-4.
- Rücker, Katrin; Warlouzet, Laurent (2009-01-01). Quelle(s) Europe(s)? / Which Europe(s)?. Peter Lang. ISBN 978-90-5201-484-5.
- Schipper, Frank (2008). Driving Europe: Building Europe on Roads in the Twentieth Century. Amsterdam University Press. ISBN 978-90-5260-308-7.
- Willis, F. Roy (1968-02-01). France, Germany, and the New Europe, 1945-1967. Stanford University Press. p. 341. ISBN 978-0-8047-0241-6.
