= Port-Lesney =

Commune in Bourgogne-Franche-Comté, France

- Commune
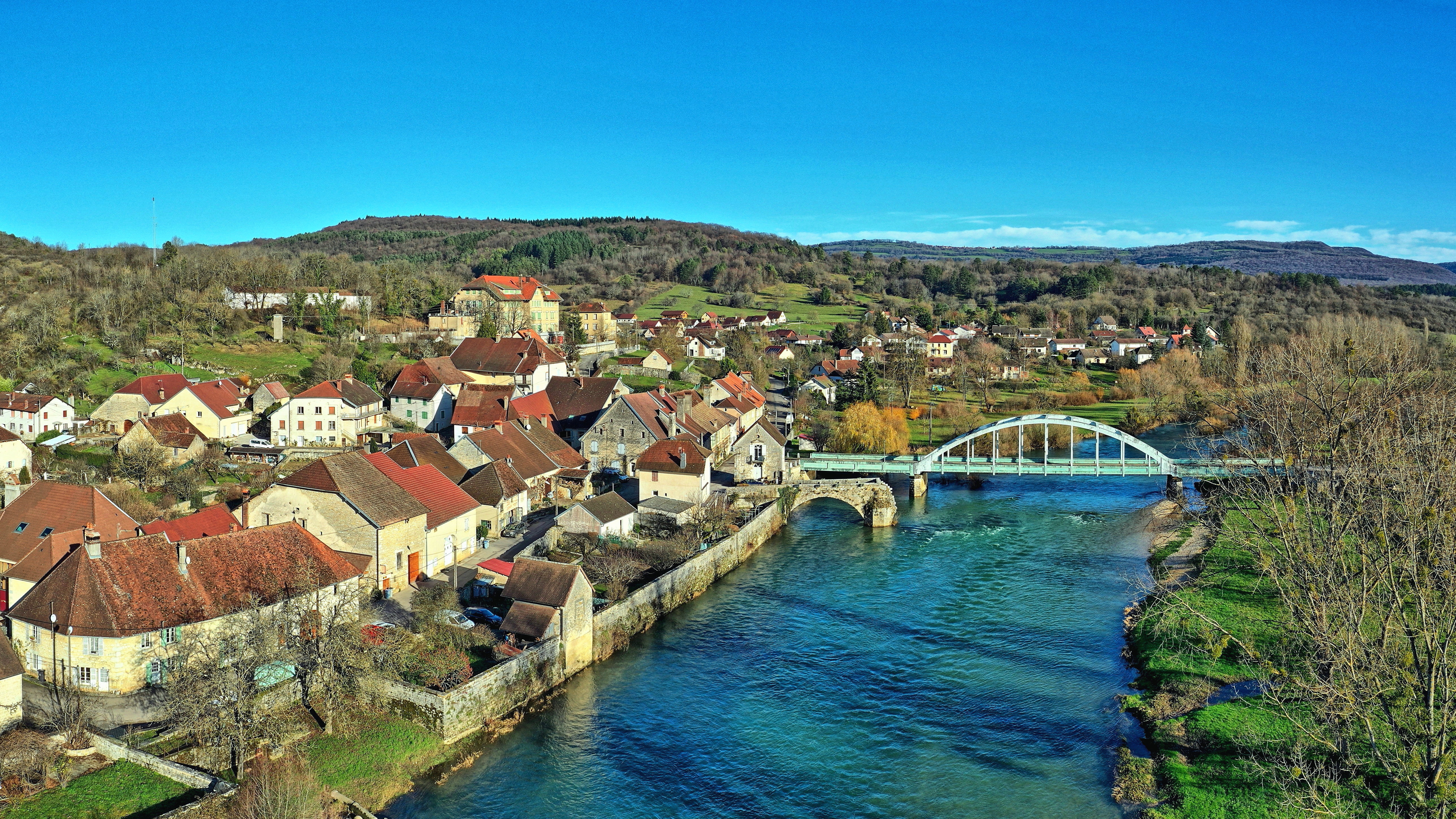

- Coat of arms
- Location of Port-Lesney
- Location within France Location within Bourgogne-Franche-Comté
- Coordinates: 47°00′13″N 5°49′29″E
- Country: France
- Region: Bourgogne-Franche-Comté
- Department: Jura
- Arrondissement: Dole
- Canton: Mont-sous-Vaudrey

Government
  - Mayor (2020–2026): Jean Théry
- Area^{1}: 10.91 km^{2} (4.21 sq mi)
- Highest elevation: 440 m (1,440 ft)
- Lowest elevation: 240 m (790 ft)
- Population (2023): 532
  - Density: 48.8/km^{2} (126/sq mi)
- Time zone: UTC+01:00 (CET)
  - Summer (DST): UTC+02:00 (CEST)
- INSEE/Postal code: 39439 /39330
- ^{1} French Land Register data, which excludes lakes, ponds, glaciers > 1 km^{2} (0.386 sq mi or 247 acres) and river estuaries.

Port-Lesney (French pronunciation: [pɔʁ lɛnɛ]) is a commune in the Jura department' in Bourgogne-Franche-Comté in eastern France. It lies on both banks of the river Loue.

== Population ==
Historical population
Year	Pop.	±% p.a.
1968	539	—
1975	559	+0.52%
1982	494	−1.75%
1990	431	−1.69%
1999	414	−0.45%
2007	517	+2.82%
2012	556	+1.47%
2017	526	−1.10%
2023	532	+0.19%
Source: INSEE

== See also ==
- Communes of the Jura department
