= Vincent Auriol =

President of France from 1947 to 1954

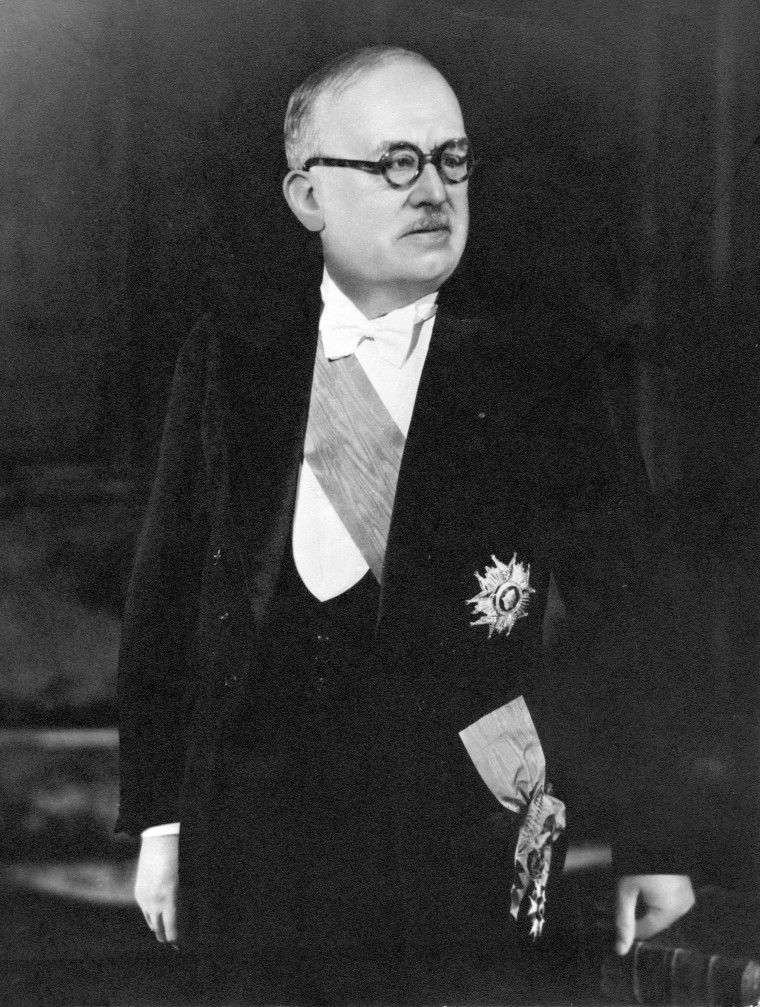
- Auriol in 1947

President of France
- In office 16 January 1947 – 16 January 1954
- Prime Minister: See list: Léon Blum; Paul Ramadier; Robert Schuman; André Marie; Henri Queuille; Georges Bidault; René Pleven; Edgar Faure; Antoine Pinay; René Mayer; Joseph Laniel
- Preceded by: Albert Lebrun
- Succeeded by: René Coty

President of the National Assembly Constituent until 27 November 1946
- In office 31 January 1946 – 20 January 1947
- Preceded by: Félix Gouin
- Succeeded by: Édouard Herriot

Personal details
- Born: Vincent Jules Auriol; 27 August 1884 Revel, France
- Died: 1 January 1966 (aged 81) Paris, France
- Party: French Section of the Workers' International
- Spouse: Michelle Auriol (m. 1911)
- Education: Toulouse 1 University Capitole

Vincent Jules Auriol (French: [vɛ̃sɑ̃ oʁjɔl]; 27 August 1884 – 1 January 1966) was President of France from 1947 to 1954. A member of the French Section of the Workers' International (SFIO), he was the first president elected under the Fourth Republic. His presidential term was marked by the Indochina War, the implementation of the Monnet Plan for modernisation, as well as France joining the Council of Europe and NATO as a founding member.

First elected to the Chamber of Deputies from Haute-Garonne in 1914, Auriol served in government under the Third Republic as Minister of Finance (1936–1937) and Minister of Justice (1937–1938).

== Early life and politics ==
Auriol was born in Revel, Haute-Garonne, as the only child of Jacques Antoine Auriol (1855–1933), a baker nicknamed Paul, and Angélique Virginie Durand (1861–1945). His great-grandmother, Anne Auriol, was a first cousin of English engineer Isambard Kingdom Brunel. He earned a law degree at the Collège de Revel in 1904 and began his career as a lawyer in Toulouse. A committed socialist, Auriol co-founded the newspaper Le Midi Socialiste in 1908; he was head of the Association of Journalists in Toulouse at this time.

In 1914, Auriol entered the Chamber of Deputies as a Socialist deputy for Muret, a position he retained until 1942. He also served as Mayor of Muret from 3 May 1925 to 17 January 1947, and as a member of the Conseil Général of Haute-Garonne from 1928 to 17 January 1947. In December 1920, after the breakup of the SFIO, Auriol refused to join the newly created SFIC and became one of the leaders of the new SFIO (the remaining socialist minority), along with Léon Blum.

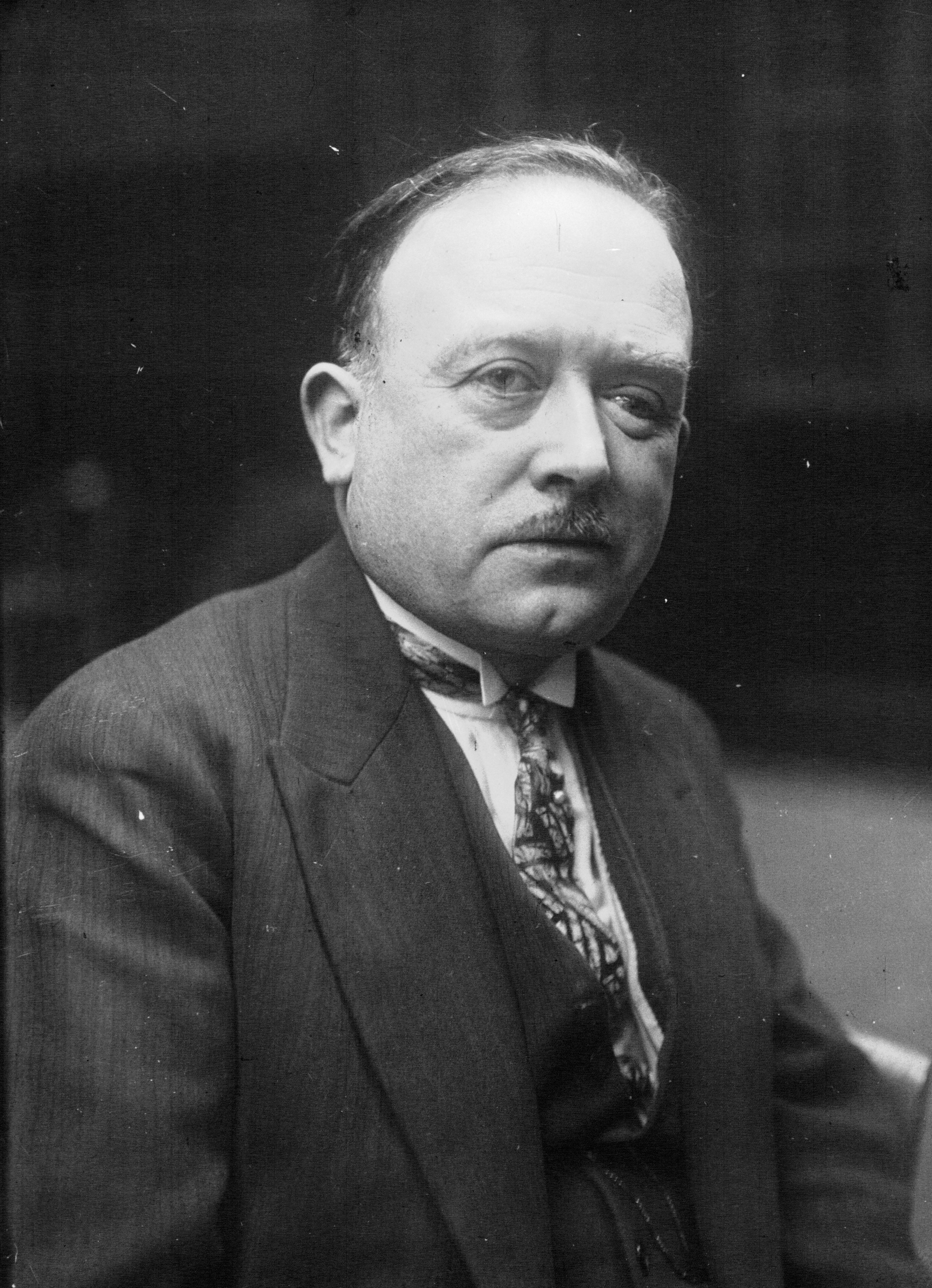
Auriol in 1927

Auriol became the party's leading spokesman on financial issues. He chaired the Finance Committee in the Chamber of Deputies from 1924 to 1926. His first cabinet post was as Minister of Finance under Léon Blum, in which Auriol controversially devalued the French franc 30% against the United States dollar, leading to capital flight and greater economic unease. This and Blum's proposals for greater regulatory restrictions on industry led to Blum's resignation as Premier; in the next government, led by Camille Chautemps, Auriol was made Minister of Justice, then later he was appointed as Minister of Coordination of Services of the Presidency of the Council in Blum's short-lived government in 1938. Édouard Daladier's conservative–Radical government formed on 10 April 1938 returned Auriol to the Chamber of Deputies.

Auriol was one of the 80 deputies who voted against the extraordinary powers given to Prime Minister Philippe Pétain on 10 July 1940 that brought about the Nazi-backed Vichy government. As a result, he was placed under house arrest until he escaped to the French Resistance in October 1942, and fought with the resistance for a year. Auriol fled to London in October 1943. He represented the Socialists at the Free French Consultative Assembly (organized by Charles de Gaulle in Algiers later that year). In July 1944, he represented France at the United Nations Monetary and Financial Conference at Bretton Woods, United States.

== Post-war life and presidency ==
After World War II, Auriol served as Minister of State in de Gaulle's provisional government. He was a member of the Constituent Assemblies which drafted the constitution of the short-lived French Fourth Republic, and was President of the Assemblies. He lobbied for a "third force" as an alternative to both Communism and Gaullism. Auriol led the French delegation to the United Nations and was France's first representative on the United Nations Security Council in 1946. He served as a Deputy for Haute-Garonne in the National Assembly from 1946 until 31 December 1947. Meanwhile, the National Assembly elected him on 16 January 1947 as the first President of the Fourth Republic by a wide margin, receiving 452 votes (51.19%) against the 242 (27.41%) for the People's Republican Movement (MRP) candidate, Auguste Champetier de Ribes.

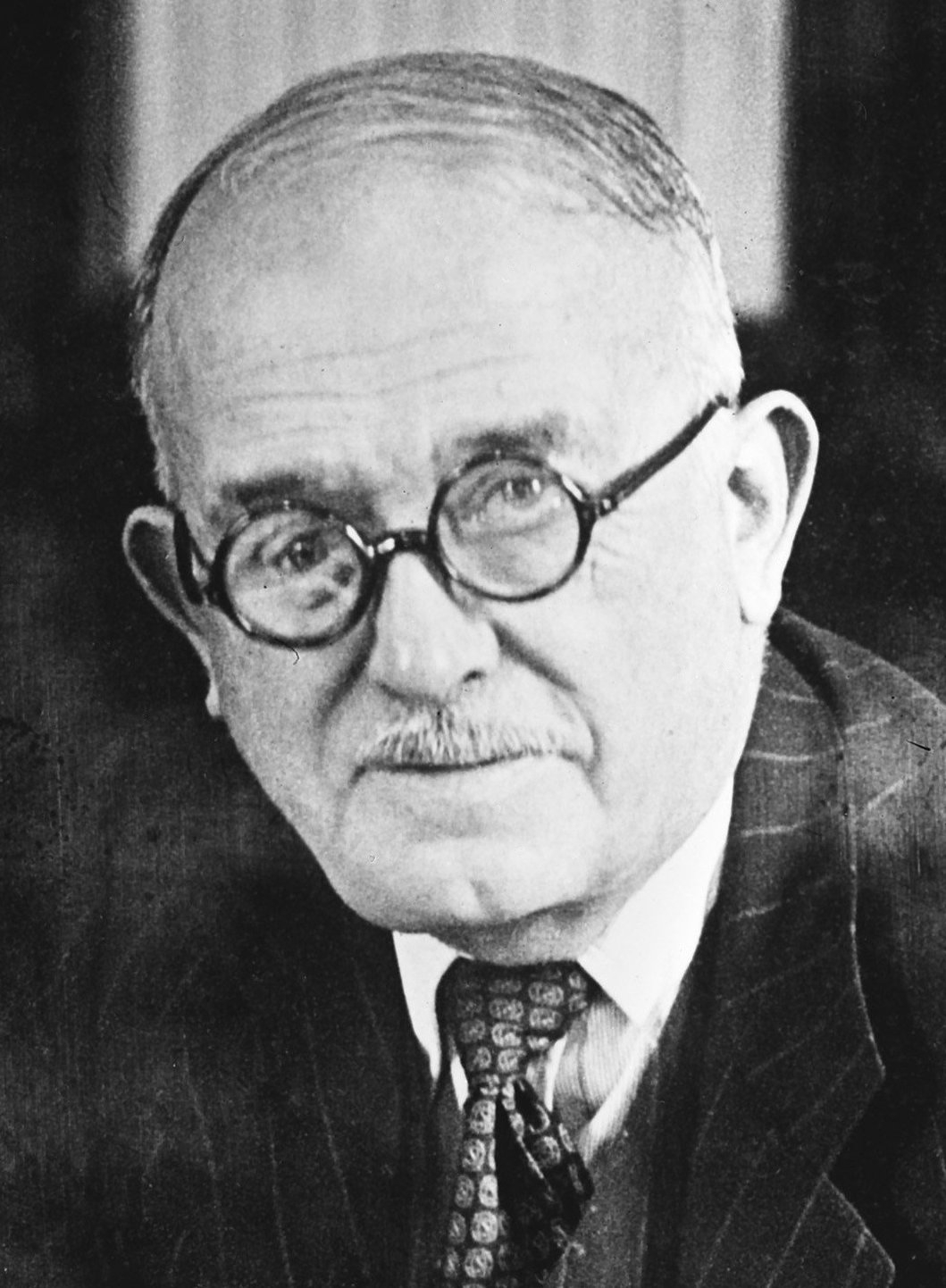
Auriol in January 1946

As president, Auriol pursued a relatively weak presidency like the office under the Third Republic. He attempted to reconcile political factions within France and warm relations between France and its allies. He was criticized for France's ailing economy and political turmoil in the post-war period, and the war in Indochina. A series of debilitating strikes were waged across France in 1947, initiated by the Confédération Générale du Travail. The strikes escalated into violence in November of that year, leading, on 28 November, to the government deploying 80,000 French Army reservists to face the "insurrection". The Communist Party, who often supported the strikes, were expelled from the legislature in early December. The strikes ended on 10 December, but more would come in 1948, and again in 1953 in response to the Joseph Laniel government's austerity program.

Apart from the inconclusive war in Indochina, France's colonial empire decayed under Auriol's presidency. Clashes in Morocco, Madagascar, Algeria, and Tunisia became more frequent; an Algerian independence movement, the Front de Libération Nationale, was founded in 1951, and in 1953 the French overthrew Mohammed V, the Sultan of Morocco, after he demanded greater autonomy. France fought an uprising in Madagascar and imprisoned Tunisian independence leader Habib Bourguiba in 1952.

When Auriol's term as president expired, he did not run for re-election, and was succeeded by René Coty as President of France on 16 January 1954. Auriol commented on leaving office: "The work was killing me; they called me out of bed at all hours of the night to receive resignations of prime ministers" (there were eighteen different governments during his seven years as president.)

After his presidency, Auriol assumed the role of elder statesman, and wrote articles on political topics. Auriol became a member of the Constitutional Council of France in 1958 at the establishment of the French Fifth Republic; he resigned from the SFIO in the same year. He unsuccessfully lobbied against the constitution in the 1958 national referendum, and resigned from his position on the Constitutional Council in 1960 to protest the growing power of Charles de Gaulle's presidency. In 1965, he endorsed François Mitterrand for the presidency.

On 1 January 1966, Vincent Auriol died in hospital in the 7th arrondissement of Paris and was buried at Muret, Haute-Garonne.

== Personal life ==
On 1 June 1911, Auriol married Michelle Aucouturier. Around seven to eight years later, the couple had a son, Paul (1919–1992) and the aviator Jacqueline Auriol was his daughter-in-law.

== Honors and awards ==
- Grand Cross of the Order of Legion of Honour
- Resistance Medal
- Cross of the Resistance Volunteer Combatant
- Grand Cross of the Order of St. Olav
- National Order of Honour and Merit

== See also ==
- Politics of France

Political offices
Preceded by Marcel Régnier	Minister of Finance; 1936–1937	Succeeded by Georges Bonnet
Preceded by Marc Rucart	Minister of Justice; 1937–1938	Succeeded by César Campinchi
Preceded by Félix Gouin	President of the National Assembly; 1946–1947	Succeeded by Édouard Herriot
Vacant Title last held by Albert Lebrun	President of France; 1947–1954	Succeeded by René Coty
Regnal titles
Preceded by Georges Bidault	Co-Prince of Andorra; 1947–1954; Served alongside: Ramón Iglesias i Navarri	Succeeded by René Coty
