= René Coty =

President of France from 1954 to 1959

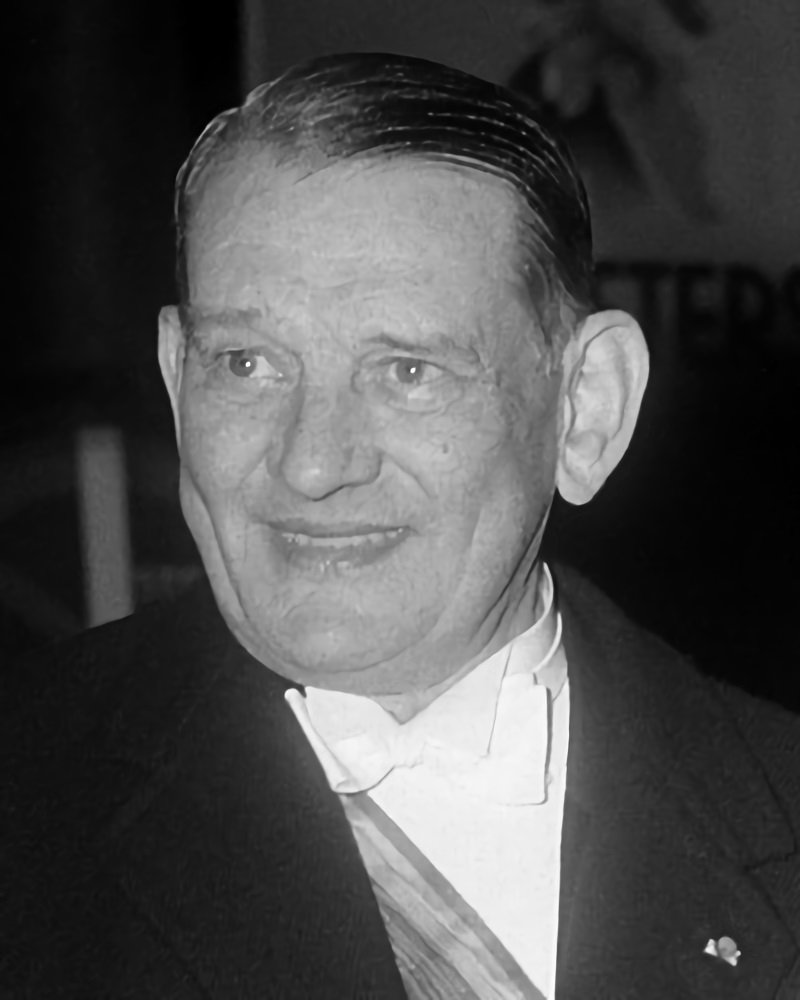
- Coty in 1954

President of France
- In office 16 January 1954 – 8 January 1959
- Prime Minister: See list: Joseph Laniel; Pierre Mendes-France; Edgar Faure; Guy Mollet; Maurice Bourgès-Maunoury; Félix Gaillard; Pierre Pflimlin; Charles de Gaulle
- Preceded by: Vincent Auriol
- Succeeded by: Charles de Gaulle

Member of the Senate
- In office 7 November 1948 – 23 December 1953
- Constituency: Seine-Maritime
- In office 14 January 1936 – 1 January 1944
- Constituency: Seine-Maritime

Minister of Reconstruction and Urban Development
- In office 24 November 1947 – 7 September 1948
- Prime Minister: Robert Schuman; André Marie
- Preceded by: Jean Letourneau
- Succeeded by: Eugène Claudius-Petit

Member of the National Assembly
- In office 21 October 1945 – 19 November 1948
- Constituency: Seine-Maritime

Member of the Chamber of Deputies
- In office 10 June 1923 – 31 May 1935
- Constituency: Seine-Maritime

Personal details
- Born: Gustave Jules René Coty; 20 March 1882 Le Havre, Seine-Maritime, France
- Died: 22 November 1962 (aged 80) Le Havre, Seine-Maritime, France
- Party: Radical-Socialist Party (1908–1923); Democratic Alliance (1923–1941); Independent (1941–1949); National Centre of Independents and Peasants (1949–1962)
- Spouse: Germaine Corblet (m. 1905; died 1955)
- Children: Geneviève (1907–1987); Anne-Marie (1909–1987)
- Education: University of Caen Normandy
- Profession: Lawyer
- Awards: Legion of Honour

Military service
- Branch/service: French Army
- Years of service: 1914–1918
- Rank: Soldier
- Unit: 129th Infantry Regiment
- Battles/wars: World War I: Battle of Verdun (1916)

Gustave Jules René Coty (French: [ʁəne kɔti]; 20 March 1882 – 22 November 1962) was President of France from 1954 to 1959. He was the second and last president of the Fourth French Republic.

== Early life and politics ==
René Coty was born in Le Havre and studied at the University of Caen, where he graduated in 1902 with degrees in law and philosophy. He worked as a lawyer in his hometown of Le Havre, specialising in maritime and commercial law.

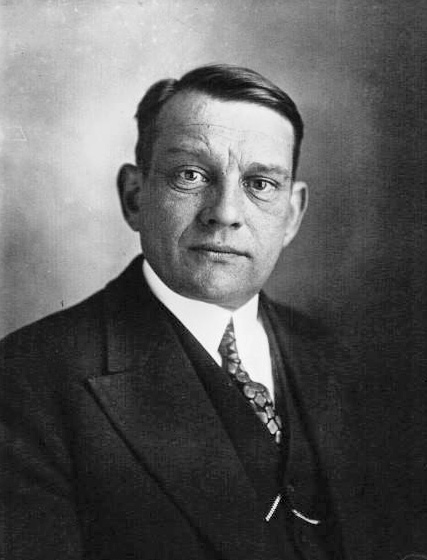
Coty in 1929.

He also became involved in politics, as a member of the Radical Party, and in 1907 was elected as a district councillor. The following year, he was elected to the communal council of Le Havre as a member of the Republican Left group. He retained both of these positions until 1919. Coty also served as a member of the Conseil Général of Seine-Inférieure from 1913 to 1942, holding the post of vice president from 1932.

When the First World War broke out, Coty volunteered for the army, joining the 129th Infantry Regiment. He fought at the Battle of Verdun. He entered the Chamber of Deputies in 1923, succeeding Jules Siegfried as Deputy for Seine-Inférieure. However, by this stage of his political career, Coty had moved away from the Radical Party and sat as a member of the Republican Union. Between 13 and 23 December 1930 he served as Under-secretary of State for the Interior in the government of Théodore Steeg.

In 1936, Coty was elected to the Senate for Seine-Inférieure. He was one of the French parliamentarians who, on 10 July 1940, voted to give extraordinary powers to Philippe Pétain, thereby bringing about the Nazi-backed Vichy government. Coty remained relatively inactive during the Second World War, although he was rehabilitated after the war.

== Postwar life and presidency ==
He was a member of the Constituent National Assembly from 1944 to 1946, and chaired the right-wing Independent Republican group, which later became part of the National Center of Independents and Peasants. Coty was elected to the National Assembly in 1946 as a Deputy for Seine-Inférieure, and from November 1947 to September 1948, he served as Minister for Reconstruction and Urban Planning in the governments of Robert Schuman and André Marie. Coty was elected as a member of the Council of the Republic in November 1948, and served as Vice President of the Council from 1952.

Coty stood as a candidate for president in 1953, although it was thought unlikely that he would be elected. Nonetheless, and despite twelve successive ballots, right-wing favourite Joseph Laniel failed to obtain the absolute majority required. Following the withdrawal of another key right-wing candidate, Louis Jacquinot, Coty was finally elected in the thirteenth ballot on 23 December 1953, winning 477 votes against the 329 of socialist Marcel-Edmond Naegelen. He succeeded Vincent Auriol as president on 16 January 1954.

As President of the Republic, Coty was even less active than his predecessor in trying to influence policy. His presidency was troubled by the political instability of the Fourth Republic and the Algerian question. With the deepening of the crisis in 1958, on 29 May of that year, President Coty appealed to Charles de Gaulle, the "most illustrious of Frenchmen" to become the last Prime Minister of the Fourth Republic. Coty had threatened to resign if de Gaulle's appointment was not approved by the National Assembly.

De Gaulle drafted a new constitution, and on 28 September, a referendum took place in which 79.2% of those who voted supported the proposals, which led to the Fifth Republic. De Gaulle was elected as president of the new republic by an electoral college in December, and succeeded Coty on 9 January 1959. Coty was a member of the Constitutional Council from 1959 until his death in 1962.

== In popular culture ==
A photo of President Coty is a running joke in the 2006 French spy spoof OSS 117: Cairo, Nest of Spies.

== See also ==
- Politics of France

Political offices
Preceded by Jean Letourneau	Minister of Reconstruction; 1947–1948	Succeeded by Eugène Claudius-Petit
Preceded by Vincent Auriol	President of France; 1954–1959	Succeeded by Charles de Gaulle
Regnal titles
Preceded by Vincent Auriol	Co-Prince of Andorra; 1954–1959; Served alongside: Ramon Iglesias i Navarri	Succeeded by Charles de Gaulle
