= Joseph Laniel =

French politician (1889–1975)

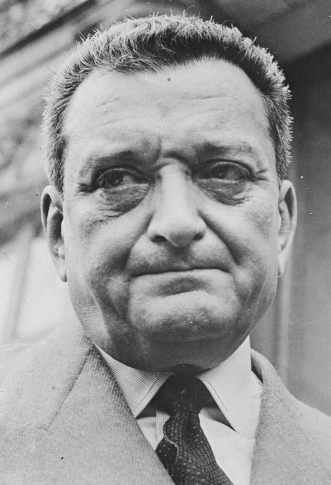
- Laniel in 1951

Prime Minister of France
- In office 28 June 1953 – 18 June 1954
- President: Vincent Auriol; René Coty
- Preceded by: René Mayer
- Succeeded by: Pierre Mendès France

Personal details
- Born: Joseph Eugène Henry Laniel; 12 October 1889 Vimoutiers, France
- Died: 8 April 1975 (aged 85) Paris, France
- Resting place: Lisores, France
- Party: Democratic Alliance (1932–1938); Republican Party of Liberty (1945–1951); National Centre of Independents and Peasants (1951–1958)

Joseph Eugène Henry Laniel (French: [ʒozɛf lanjɛl]; 12 October 1889 – 8 April 1975) was a French conservative politician of the Fourth Republic, who served as Prime Minister for a year from 1953 to 1954. During the middle of his tenure as Prime Minister Laniel was an unsuccessful candidate for the French presidency in 1953, an office won by René Coty.

== Biography ==
Laniel was born at Vimoutiers in Normandy to a family that ran a successful textile factory.

On 10 July 1940, he voted in favour of granting the cabinet presided by Marshal Philippe Pétain authority to draw up a new constitution, thereby effectively ending the French Third Republic and establishing Vichy France. However, he later joined the French Resistance and was one of the founders of the National Council of the Resistance (CNR).

Co-founder of the Republican Party of Liberty (PRL), then of the National Center of Independents and Peasants (CNIP), Laniel's cabinet was overturned after the French defeat at Dien Bien Phu in Indochina in 1954. He was succeeded by Pierre Mendès France.

During the First Indochina War, France under the Leadership of Laniel seek an armistice that was supported by United Kingdom and other countries.

== Laniel's Ministry, 28 June 1953 – 19 June 1954 ==
- Joseph Laniel – President of the Council
- Henri Queuille – Vice President of the Council
- Paul Reynaud – Vice President of the Council
- Pierre-Henri Teitgen – Vice President of the Council
- Georges Bidault – Minister of Foreign Affairs
- René Pleven – Minister of National Defence and the Armed Forces
- Léon Martinaud-Déplat – Minister of the Interior
- Edgar Faure – Minister of Finance and Economic Affairs
- Jean-Marie Louvel – Minister of Commerce and Industry
- Paul Bacon – Minister of Labour and Social Security
- Paul Ribeyre – Minister of Justice
- André Marie – Minister of National Education
- André Mutter – Minister of Veterans and War Victims
- Louis Jacquinot – Minister of Overseas France
- Jacques Chastellain – Minister of Public Works, Transport, and Tourism
- Paule Coste-Floret – Minister of Public Health and Population
- Maurice Lemaire – Minister of Reconstruction and Housing
- Pierre Ferri – Minister of Posts
- Edmond Barrachin – Minister of Constitutional Reform
- Édouard Corniglion-Molinier – Minister of State

Changes

- 3 June 1954 – Édouard Frédéric-Dupont enters the ministry as Minister of Relations with Partner States.

Political offices
Preceded by Charles Brune	Minister of Posts; 1951	Succeeded by Roger Duchet
Preceded by Maurice Petsche	Minister of State; 1951–1952	Succeeded by (none)
Preceded by René Mayer	Prime Minister of France; 1953–1954	Succeeded by Pierre Mendès France
