= Pierre Courant =

French politician

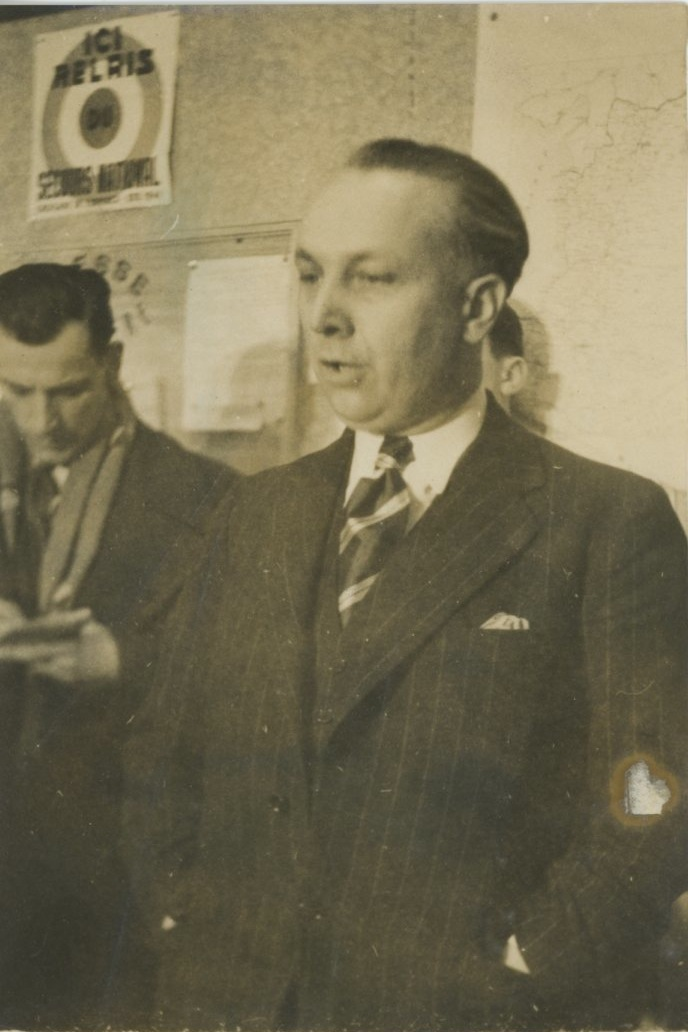
Pierre Courant

Pierre Courant (12 September 1897, Le Havre, Seine-Maritime – 22 March 1965, Le Havre) was a French politician. He belonged first to the Independent Republicans (1946–1955) and then to the National Centre of Independents and Peasants (1956–1962). He was, in succession, the minister of Reconstruction and Urban Development, minister of Housing, and minister of Budget.
