= André Mallarmé =

French politician (1877–1956)

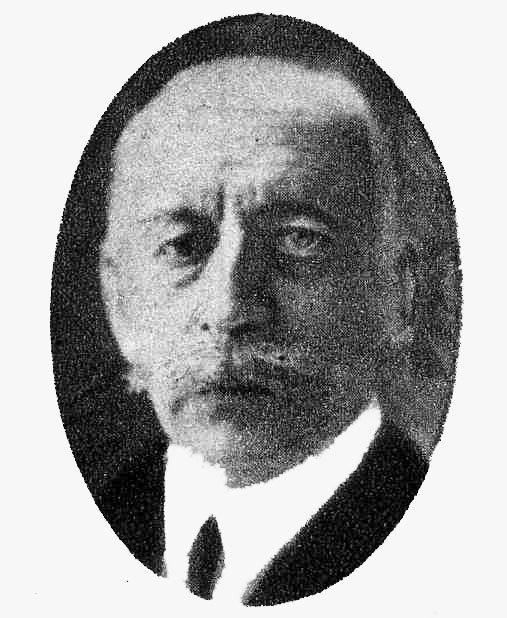
André Mallarmé

André Mallarmé (French pronunciation: [ɑ̃dʁe malaʁme]; 6 August 1877 – 8 April 1956) was a French politician.

Mallarmé was born in Bouzaréah, Algeria. He represented the Republican-Socialist Party from 1924 to 1928 and the Independent Radicals from 1928 to 1939 in the Chamber of Deputies. He was Senator from 1939 to 1940. He was Minister of Posts, Telegraphs and Telephones in 1930 and 1934 and Minister of National Education from 1934 to 1935.

On 10 July 1940, Mallarmé voted in favour of granting the cabinet presided by Marshal Philippe Pétain authority to draw up a new constitution, thereby effectively ending the French Third Republic and establishing Vichy France. On 23 January 1941, he was made a member of the National Council of Vichy France.
