= Great Oil Sniffer Hoax =

1979 French business scandal

The complete text of the French Court of Auditors report, published in the Libération newspaper on January 4, 1984.

The Great Oil Sniffer Hoax was a 1979 scandal involving French oil company Elf Aquitaine. The company spent millions of dollars developing a new gravity wave-based oil detection system, which was later revealed to be a scam. Elf lost over $150 million in the hoax. In France, the scandal is known as the "Avions Renifleurs" ("Sniffer Planes").

== Prior to Elf ==
Aldo Bonassoli, a telephone-company electrician in Ventimiglia in Italy, invented a new type of desalination system. In 1965, Belgian Count Alain de Villegas became interested in the idea and later said that "We can live without oil, but not without water." When the device did not work as expected, the team turned its attention to a related concept, a "water sniffer" that would find water.

De Villegas was also a member of the Pan-European Union, an anti-communist group headquartered in Brussels. Through contacts in this group, in 1969 he met Jean Violet, a lawyer who worked for the Service de Documentation Extérieure et de Contre-Espionnage (SDECE), the French intelligence agency. Violet, who was an influential behind-the-scenes player in the European anti-communist world, had formed the Pinay Circle in the 1950s around its titular leader, Antoine Pinay.

Violet expressed interest in the water sniffer and agreed to try to find development funding. An attempt to interest Crosby Kelly in New York failed when Kelly stated he would only put up the money if the device was first proven to work. A friend of Violet's, Italian industrialist Carlo Pesenti, showed more interest and agreed to start funding early development. A new company was formed in Switzerland: Fisalma, Inc. (registered in Panama), under the direction of Philippe de Weck, president of Union des Banques Suisses (later part of UBS AG from the 1990s). Through contacts in Opus Dei, Violet arranged for Spain's tourism minister, Alfredo Sánchez Bella, to put several test sites in Spain at the team's disposal.

The tests of the sniffer were unsuccessful. The Yom Kippur War of October 1973 broke out and oil prices quadrupled. De Villegas kept his project alive by announcing that the machines could also detect oil, persuading Pesenti to invest additional funds. Using contacts provided by Pinay, they flew their equipment to South Africa, where they gained government authorization to conduct tests over Zululand. Pesenti's engineers fitted one of the machines into a Douglas DC-3 for the surveys. By the end of 1975 Pesenti opted out due to costs. The Zululand bore eventually bottomed out at 6,000 meters with a drill stem and no oil.

== Elf involvement ==
Although the details remain unclear to this day, some time in 1976 de Villegas and Bonassoli were introduced to Elf officials, apparently through de Villegas or Violet's connections in the French intelligence services. Bonassoli explained that he had been tinkering with televisions when he hit upon the idea of building a gravity wave detector that could be used to detect masses underwater - not just oil, but submarines as well. He had developed these into two machines: "Delta" which was designed to detect oil reserves from the air and produced a paper report and "Omega" which mapped from a closer range and displayed its output on a TV screen. He was willing to demonstrate the devices, but only if there were no scientists present, claiming that they might steal his ideas. Information about the pair's invention quickly made its way up the French political hierarchy.

Despite the scientific problems that would have turned up had they been investigated, there is no record of anyone involved having attempted any sort of scientific due diligence. Nor is there any record of any sort of background check, which would have turned up the string of previous failures.

Writers have commented on a sort of political chauvinism that surrounded the project. At the time Elf was almost wholly controlled by the government, as were similar companies in other European nations and Canada. Unlike those companies, Elf had little crude oil supply of its own and few known deposits for future commercialization. Elf was in danger of losing its status as a producer, at some point becoming nothing more than another refiner. If the devices could find new sources of oil practically anywhere, as was being claimed, France might remain among the small family of oil-producing European nations. This possibility was so attractive that the officials involved overlooked any doubts that were expressed, while also keeping the project completely secret.

Between 30 April and 7 May 1976 the devices were demonstrated for Elf officials, who obliged to Bonassoli's "no scientists" request. The devices, not much larger than a few photocopiers, were installed in a transport plane behind curtains and flown around over known oil fields. Sure enough the device flashed lights, drew lines on the attached TV, and printed paper with a sort of topographical map on it. The map looked almost identical to previously published public exploration reports. The Elf observers, including company founder Pierre Guillaumat, were convinced that the devices were real.

In May 1976 Elf signed a 200 million Swiss Franc (US$80 million, equivalent to $453,000,000 in 2025) contract for a two-year exclusive use while the device was tested. When this contract was complete, a second contract would take over in 1978 for an additional 250 million Francs (equivalent to $642,000,000 in 2025), expenses not included. This was apparently done without Elf's civilian board of directors being made aware of the project.

France's president, Valéry Giscard d'Estaing, was told of the devices in June 1976 and was aware of the development contracts being given to de Villegas' Fisalma. Four months later the new prime minister, Raymond Barre, learned of devices when his signature was required to waive various currency restrictions to transfer the funds abroad to the company's Swiss bank account. To keep the project secret, the funds were transferred through previously small Elf bank accounts.

== Exposure ==
In spite of numerous "successful" flights, every attempt to drill at the indicated locations came up empty. In response Bonassoli repeatedly stated that his device appeared to be "too accurate" to be used and required further development. His Elf contacts, however, remained confident in spite of the failures and happily continued to provide Bonassoli with documentation of previous studies of the fields that were due to be flown over in the tests. These studies were then parroted back through the devices, further convincing the Elf managers that they worked.

Things started to change when management of Elf passed from Guillaumat to Albin Chalandon. Initially a supporter of the project, after examining project documentation, Chalandon was forced to admit that there was not a single usable result from the tests. In May 1979 he arranged for Jules Horowitz, chief of research and development for France's atomic energy agency, to visit the lab and examine "Omega". Instead of examining the device itself, he started asking Bonassoli questions about the Omega's capability to detect various common objects through a wall. After two failures, Bonassoli eventually agreed that it could easily detect a metal ruler. Bonassoli turned on the device, and sure enough out came a piece of paper with a short line on it. Horowitz returned from behind the wall and held up the ruler, which he had bent into an L shape while hidden from view.

Oddly, work continued. A month later another demonstration further revealed the hoax. Omega was shown to be outputting graphics projected from within the box. Further investigation showed that what was inside one cabinet did not simply appear to be a photocopier, but actually was a photocopier. This was the reason the devices' output always looked so similar to previous reports; Bonassoli was hand-copying them, and then simply pressed "copy" to generate output that looked similar, but slightly different, than the originals they had provided. Bonassoli attempted to deflect all criticism by stating that the entire secret of the device was one key component, which was locked in a box that he refused to open. But it was too late, Elf realized it had been hoodwinked.

Even after the hoax was discovered, the government did little to address the problem. Bonassoli managed to successfully return to Italy, where he became something of a folk hero. Elf never completed paying for the final contract, but nevertheless had spent over $150 million in total.

== Political scandal ==
All of France's quasi-public corporations were audited by the Cour des Comptes. In 1979 the magistrate in charge of Elf's audit, François Giquel, asked about the sudden change in certain accounts. These had contained only small amounts of money for many years, around 3 million Francs, and then suddenly grew to hundreds of millions of Francs over the last three years. The President personally informed Giquel that it was a matter of military secrecy, and he was sworn to secrecy. In 1982, Bernard Beck, president of the Cour des Comptes and a political ally of Giscard d'Estaing, shredded three key documents about the case at the auditor's office, as well as Giquel's office copy.

The story finally broke in December 1983. The junior Secretary for the Treasury publicly accused Beck of forfaiture ("abuse of authority") for destroying the documents. The same week Pierre Péan published a complete history of the story in the satirical magazine Le Canard Enchaîné, apparently tipped off by government insiders. The new president, François Mitterrand, seized on the story to attack his predecessor for his involvement in the "cover up", going on to claim that they had destroyed all of the documents. Giscard d'Estaing responded on television, brandishing another copy of the report which he had in his own possession, and claiming that its existence proved that the entire affair was simply a case of political manoeuvring.

This proved to be a bad idea; the report was seized and subsequently published in full. On 2 January 1984 it was released live on television by the new prime minister, Pierre Mauroy. Mauroy sarcastically accused Barre and Giscard of trying to cover up the embarrassing story. Giscard appeared on television a second time, attacking Mitterrand for "having allowed his predecessor to be attacked". The Economist claimed that Mitterrand used his influence to have a public investigation into Giscard quashed.

== Bonassoli reappears ==
In January 1984, Bonassoli held a press conference in Italy, claiming that he would hand over all the data on his machine to the Italian National Research Council (CNR). He also stated that the Soviets had expressed an interest in the machine. When asked about the claims of fraud, Bonassoli simply replied that the machine had been greatly improved since the 1970s. Nothing ever came of the announcement.
