= Mylott =

Mylott is a surname. Notable people with the surname include:

- Eva Mylott (1875–1920), Australian opera singer
- Patrick Mylott (1820–1878), Irish soldier and Victoria Cross recipient

== See also ==
- Mynott
