= RJH =

RJH may refer to:

- Shah Makhdum Airport, Bangladesh, by IATA code
- Jules Horowitz Reactor, material test reactor in France
