= Hugh Morres =

English cricketer and educator

Personal information
- Full name: Hugh Frederick Michael Morres
- Born: 8 July 1876; Wokingham, Berkshire, England
- Died: 28 January 1934 (aged 57); Swanage, Dorset, England
- Batting: Right-handed
- Bowling: Right-arm fast-medium
- Relatives: Archibald Morres (son); Thomas Morres (uncle); Elliot Morres (uncle)

Domestic team information
- Years: Team
- 1897–1923: Berkshire
- 1898–1899: Oxford University
- 1903–1905: Dorset

Career statistics
Competition	First-class
Matches	2
Runs scored	29
Batting average	9.66
100s/50s	–/–
Top score	28
Balls bowled	15
Wickets	0
Bowling average	–
5 wickets in innings	–
10 wickets in match	–
Best bowling	–
Catches/stumpings	1/–
- Source: Cricinfo, 13 February 2019

Hugh Frederick Michael Morres (8 July 1876 – 28 January 1934) was an English first-class cricketer and educator.

== Biography ==
The son of the Reverend Hugh Redmond Morres and his wife, Sophia Jane Powys, he was born at Wokingham, Berkshire. He was educated at Winchester College, before going up to Keble College, Oxford.

He debuted in minor counties cricket for Berkshire in the 1897 Minor Counties Championship against Worcestershire, the year before going up Keble College. He made two appearances in first-class cricket for Oxford University against Sussex in 1898 at Hove, before making a second and final appearance for Oxford in 1899 against the Marylebone Cricket Club at Lord's.

After graduating from Oxford he moved into teaching, as well as continuing to the play minor counties cricket. He briefly played for Dorset in 1903 and 1905, thereafter returning to represent Berkshire. He served during the First World War in the Royal Marines, holding the temporary rank of second lieutenant. Morres was teaching at Eastbourne College in 1923, when he resigned his commission with the rank of lieutenant. Following the war, he made infrequent appearances for Berkshire up until 1923. He was later the games master at Elizabeth College, Guernsey. He married Edith Manuela Forbes in 1901, with the couple having three children.

He died at Swanage, Dorset in January 1934. His son, Archibald, played first-class cricket, as did his uncles, Thomas Morres and Elliot Morres.
