= JHR =

JHR may refer to:

- Jailhouse rock (fighting style)
- Jarisch–Herxheimer reaction
- Jhangira Road railway station, in Pakistan
- JHR Developments
- Jim Henson Records
- John Holland Rail, part of the John Holland Group
- Jonkheer (Jhr.), a Dutch honorific of nobility
- Journal of Historical Review
- The Journal of Human Resources
- Journalists for Human Rights
- Jules Horowitz Reactor
- Juncos Hollinger Racing
