= Thomas Morres =

Australian cricketer

Personal information
- Full name: Thomas Furley Morres
- Born: 12 September 1829; Wokingham, Berkshire, England
- Died: 28 September 1884 (aged 55); East Melbourne, Victoria, Australia
- Batting: Right-handed
- Bowling: Right-arm roundarm medium
- Relatives: Elliot Morres (brother); Hugh Morres (nephew); Archibald Morres (great-nephew)

Domestic team information
- Years: Team
- 1855/56–1859/60: Victoria

Career statistics
Competition	First-class
Matches	6
Runs scored	87
Batting average	7.90
100s/50s	–/–
Top score	47
Balls bowled	185
Wickets	3
Bowling average	17.66
5 wickets in innings	–
10 wickets in match	–
Best bowling	2/15
Catches/stumpings	5/–
- Source: Cricinfo, 13 February 2019

Thomas Furley Morres (12 September 1829 – 28 September 1884) was an Australian cricketer. He played six first-class cricket matches for Victoria.

== See also ==
- List of Victoria first-class cricketers
