= Pierre Péan =

French investigative journalist (1938–2019)

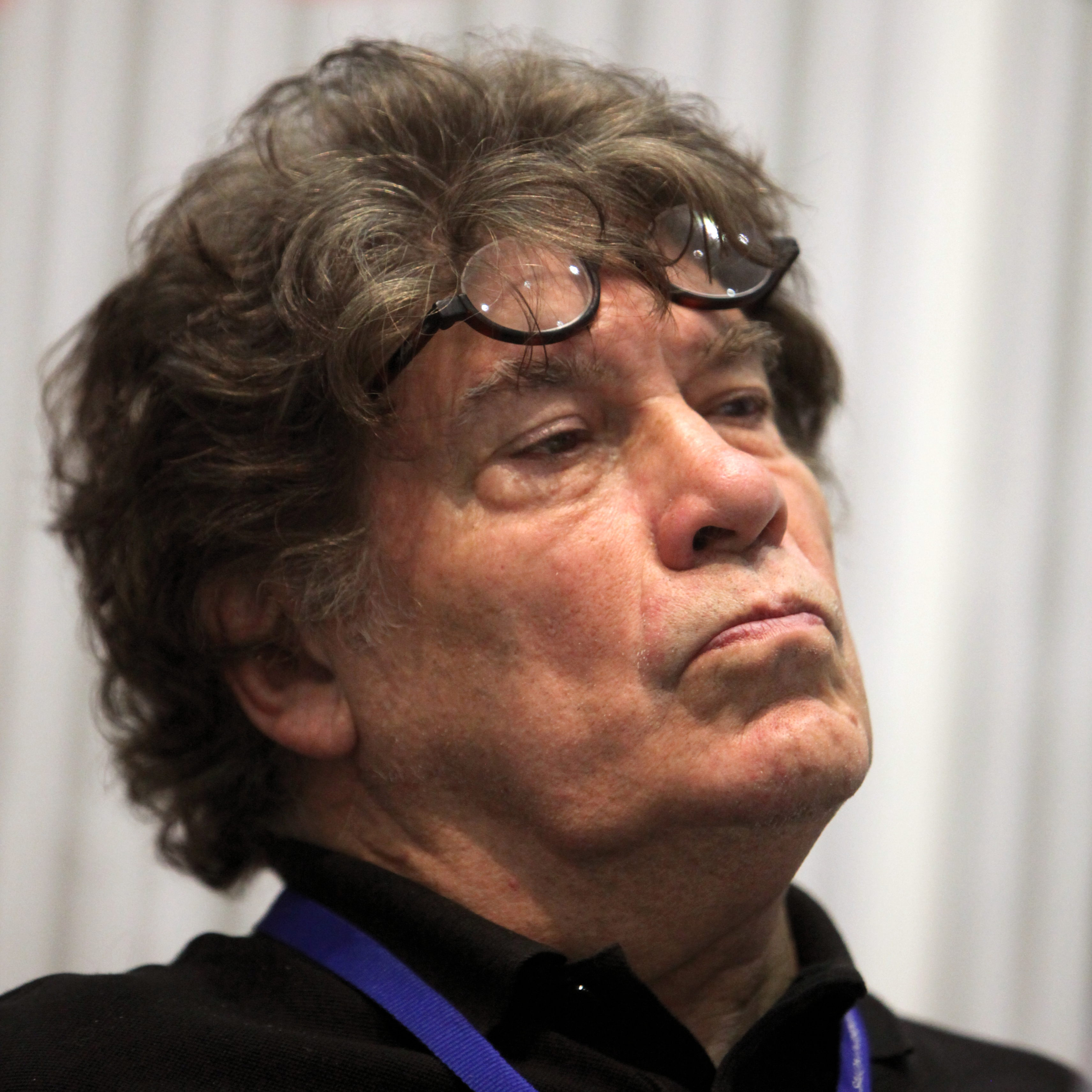
- Born: 5 March 1938; Sablé-sur-Sarthe, France
- Died: 25 July 2019 (aged 81); Argenteuil, France
- Occupation: Journalist

Pierre Péan (French pronunciation: [pjɛʁ peɑ̃]; 5 March 1938 – 25 July 2019) was a French investigative journalist and author of many books concerned with political scandals.

== Books, investigations and controversies ==
In 1983 Pierre Péan was the first to break the story of the Great Oil Sniffer Hoax in Le Canard enchaîné.

In his 1990 book L'Homme de l'ombre ("Man of the Shadows"), Péan went into great detail about Jacques Foccart, who was Charles de Gaulle's adviser on African matters, describing him as a man of mystery and yet the most powerful person in the Fifth Republic. As a result of Péan's revelations, Foccart unsuccessfully sued for libel.

In 1994, he published Une jeunesse française: François Mitterrand (A French Youth: François Mitterrand). The book is a biography covering the life of François Mitterrand from 1934 to 1947. It became a best-seller, and started a controversy over the ambiguous behaviour of Mitterrand with respect to both Marshal Philippe Pétain and the French Resistance during the occupation of France by Germany. Péan himself was unhappy about the press coverage of certain aspects of the book and considered the interpretations of some commentators to be unfair to Mitterrand.

In Manipulations Africaines (African Manipulations), published in February 2001, Péan investigated the sabotage of UTA Flight 772. He alleged that evidence pointed to Iran and Syria (acting through the Hezbollah movement), but that due to political context (notably the Gulf War), France and the United States tried to put the blame on Libya. He accuses judge Jean-Louis Bruguière of deliberately neglecting proof of Lebanon, Syria and Iran being involved to pursue only the Libyan trail. He also accused Thomas Thurman, a Federal Bureau of Investigation explosives expert, of fabricating false evidence against Libya in both the Pan Am Flight 103 and UTA Flight 772 sabotages.

In 2003, Péan published La Face cachée du Monde (The Hidden Face of Le Monde) with Philippe Cohen. The book criticised the French newspaper's editors, claiming that they had purposefully turned their backs on Le Monde's past ethics. In particular, they alleged that Jean-Marie Colombani and Edwy Plenel had, amongst other things, shown partisan bias (concerning Corsica, for example) and engaged in financial dealings that compromised the paper's independence. These findings remain controversial, but attracted much attention in France and around the world at the time of their publication, not least because they impugned the analytical reliability of a paper whose emphasis is precisely on analysis and not simply straight reporting. Le Monde's subsequent difficulties have been attributed in part to this book.

In 2005, he published Noires fureurs, blancs menteurs. Rwanda, 1990-1994 (Black Furies, White Liars. Rwanda, 1990-1994) about the Rwandan genocide. This controversial book was an explicit attack on François-Xavier Verschave's work concerning "Françafrique", a term connoting the specific kind of neocolonialism imposed by Charles de Gaulle and successive presidents of the Fifth Republic on the former African colonies of the French colonial empire. In his book, Péan defends the attitude of the French government during the Rwanda crisis. He also accuses the FPR and Paul Kagame of being responsible for the assassination of Juvénal Habyarimana. The fact that he alleged the existence of a "counter-genocide" immediately sparked critics of his book as a revisionist attempt to alter the accepted history of the Rwanda genocide with a false comparison.

In 2008, Pierre Péan wrote The World According to K, another controversial book, on the supposed ties between Bernard Kouchner - French foreign minister - and African dictators. Péan claimed two consultancies run by associates of Kouchner were paid nearly $6m (£4.1m; €4.7m) by the governments of Gabon and Congo for reports that were written by him. According to Péan, some of this money was paid by the two African governments after Kouchner became foreign minister in May 2007. Kouchner denied the accusations of conflict of interest, blaming the allegations on "circles" who hated him and pointing to differences with Péan over who should be blamed for the Rwandan genocide. Kouchner countered by accusing Pierre Péan of antisemitism, provoking a scandal in French press.

== Case dismissed ==
In September 2008, Pierre Péan was put on trial in Paris accused of inciting racial hatred in a book on the Rwandan genocide. Péan wrote that the Tutsis had a culture of lies and deceit, and it had somehow spread to the Hutus. He said it made investigating Rwanda "an almost impossible task".

Some 800,000 Rwandan Tutsis and moderate Hutus were slaughtered in 1994. A French rights group, SOS Racisme, filed the lawsuit against Péan in October 2006 and was backed by the public prosecutor. The case related to four pages in Péan's book "Noires Fureurs, Blancs Menteurs" ("Black Furies, White Liars"), published in 2005.

The trial took place from 23 to 25 September 2008. Among the witnesses testifying on Péan's behalf were two former French government ministers: the socialist Hubert Védrine and the rightist Bernard Debré. Giving evidence, Pierre Péan complained that for three years he had been under a cloud: "At best, I was treated as a racist; at worst, a genocide denier." On the second day of the trial, Péan burst into tears when a former leader of the French Union of Jewish Students compared his book to Adolf Hitler's Mein Kampf. A survivor of the Rwandan genocide, psychotherapist Esther Mujawo-Keiner, accused him of "playing with words that can kill", to which Péan, without apologising for the words that he used, replied: "I bow down in front of the suffering of the victims."

In November 2008, when the case against Péan was dismissed, his lawyer said the verdict was "a victory for freedom of expression, and for a real exchange of ideas on what is a very difficult subject." SOS Racisme said they would appeal against the court's decision.

== See also ==
- Pan Am Flight 103 conspiracy theories
- Hans Köchler's Lockerbie trial observer mission
- Ulrich Lumpert
- (in French) Complaint against Péan on charges of "revisionism" following his publication of Noires fureurs, blancs menteurs
