= Elliot Morres =

English cricketer

Personal information
- Full name: Elliot James Morres
- Born: 10 April 1831; Reading, Berkshire, England
- Died: 5 November 1895 (aged 64); Bath, Somerset, England
- Batting: Unknown
- Bowling: Unknown
- Relatives: Thomas Morres (brother); Hugh Morres (nephew); Archibald Morres (great-nephew)

Domestic team information
- Years: Team
- 1850–1851: Oxford University

Career statistics
Competition	First-class
Matches	3
Runs scored	23
Batting average	5.75
100s/50s	–/–
Top score	10
Balls bowled	?
Wickets	7
Bowling average	?
5 wickets in innings	–
10 wickets in match	–
Best bowling	3/?
Catches/stumpings	1/–
- Source: Cricinfo, 31 March 2020

Elliot James Morres (10 April 1831 – 5 November 1895) was an English first-class cricketer and soldier.

The son of the Royal Navy commander Elliot Morres, he was born at Reading in April 1831. He was educated at Winchester College, before going up to Trinity College, Oxford. While studying at Oxford, he played first-class cricket for Oxford University on three occasions, playing once against Cambridge University in The University Match of 1850, and twice against the Marylebone Cricket Club in 1850 and 1851. He scored 23 runs in his three matches, in addition to taking seven wickets.

He was a student of Lincoln's Inn, but was never called to the bar. Instead, he served in the British Army, being commissioned as an ensign in the Royal Berkshire Militia in January 1855. In May of the same year, he transferred to the 47th Regiment in the Regular Army and was promoted to lieutenant in September 1855. Morres died at Bath in November 1895. His brother, Thomas, was also a first-class cricketer.
