= Thomas Wilson (cricketer, born 1936) =

English cricketer

Personal information
- Full name: Thomas Crichton Wilson
- Born: 18 November 1936; Eastbourne, Sussex, England
- Died: 27 April 2022 (aged 85)
- Batting: Right-handed
- Bowling: Right-arm medium-fast

Career statistics
Competition	First-class
Matches	1
Runs scored	0
Batting average	–
100s/50s	0/0
Top score	0*
Balls bowled	54
Wickets	1
Bowling average	42.00
5 wickets in innings	0
10 wickets in match	0
Best bowling	1/25
Catches/stumpings	0/–
- Source: Cricinfo, 24 June 2019

Thomas Crichton Wilson (18 November 1936 – 27 April 2022) was an English first-class cricketer.

Educated at Eastbourne College, Wilson played a single first-class cricket match for L. C. Stevens' XI against Cambridge University at Eastbourne in 1960. He took one wicket in the match with his right-arm medium-fast bowling, dismissing Michael Willard in the Cambridge first-innings, taking figures of 1 for 42 across the match.

Wilson emigrated to Canada in 1966 and worked in Project Management. He died on 27 April 2022, aged 85.
