= Faccombe =

Village and parish in Hampshire, England

Coordinates: 51.319092°N 1.440625°W

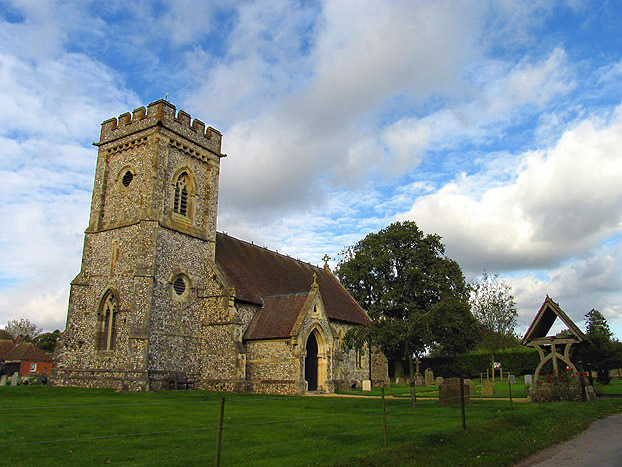
- Parish Church

- Location within Hampshire
- Population: 146 (2011 Census including Linkenholt and Netherton)
- OS grid reference: SU3907957925
- Civil parish: Faccombe
- District: Test Valley
- Shire county: Hampshire
- Region: South East
- Country: England
- Sovereign state: United Kingdom
- Post town: ANDOVER
- Postcode district: SP11
- Dialling code: 01264
- Police: Hampshire and Isle of Wight
- Fire: Hampshire and Isle of Wight
- Ambulance: South Central
- UK Parliament: North West Hampshire

Faccombe is a village and civil parish in Hampshire, England, on the Hampshire-Berkshire border and the North Downs. Andover lies 8 miles (13 km) away; Newbury in Berkshire is 2 miles (3.2 km) closer.

The village was originally called "Faccombe Upstrete" in medieval times to distinguish it from Netherton, Hampshire, a village lower in the valley. The village was the home of Timothy Landon, a British officer instrumental to the modern history of Oman.

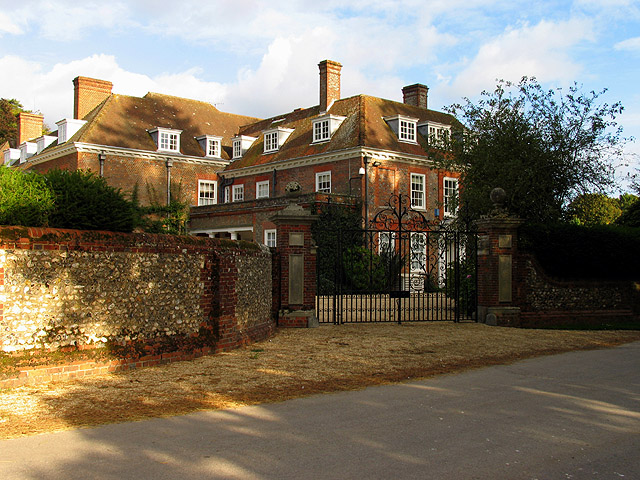
Faccombe Manor (2005) by Pam Brophy

The village has an inn, The Jack Russell Inn.

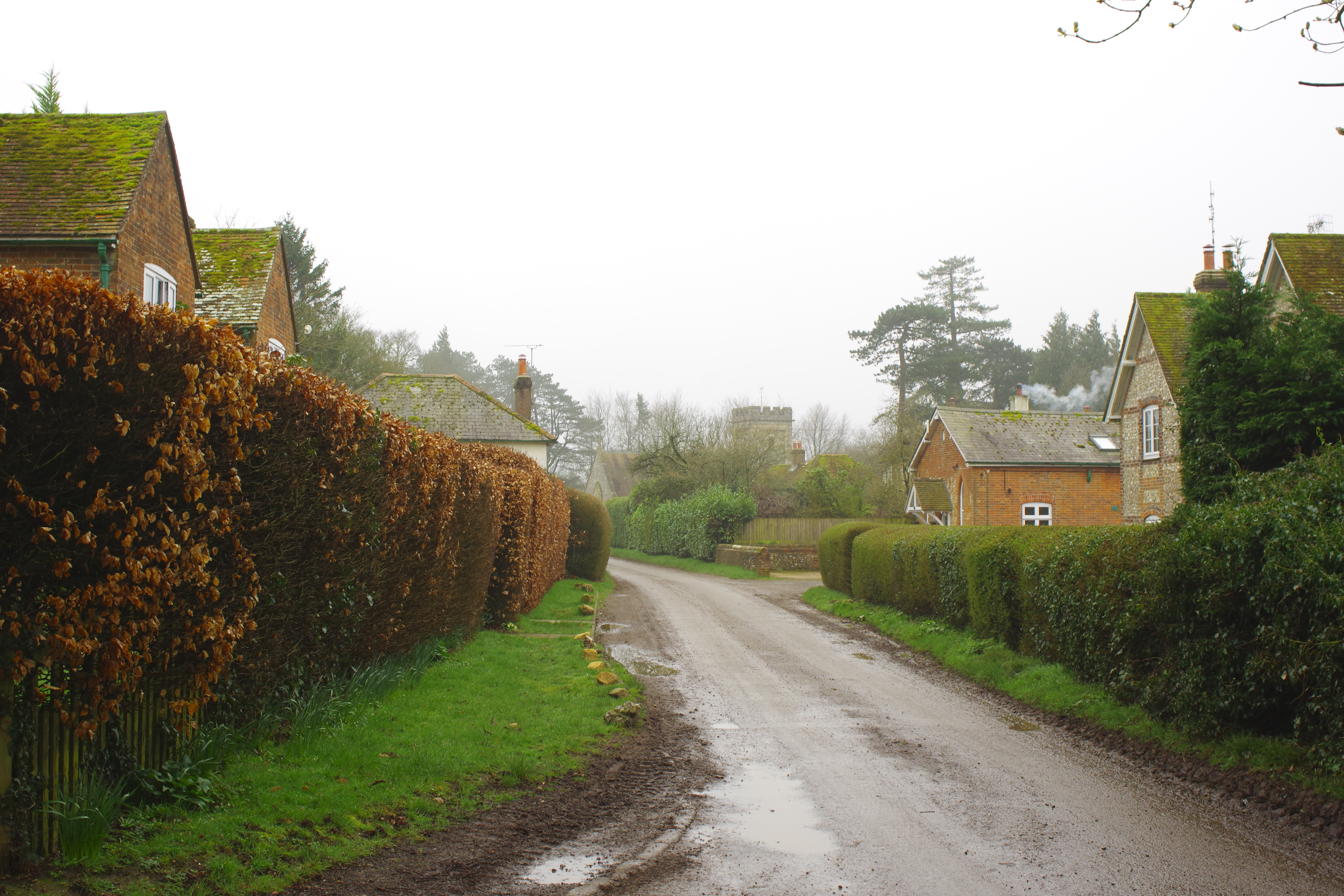
Village Road (2026) by Federico Tak

== Landmarks ==
A large part of the parish is part of the Faccombe Estate which is used for shooting and includes a wind turbine. The estate was formerly owned by Brigadier Timothy Landon.

The parish includes parts, although not the summits, of Combe Hill and Pilot Hill. Pilot Hill is the county top of Hampshire.

== Governance ==
The village is part of the civil parish of Faccombe and is part of the Bourne Valley ward of Test Valley District Council. The district council is a Non-metropolitan district of Hampshire County Council.
