= Netherton, Hampshire =

Hamlet in Hampshire, England

Coordinates: 51°18′54″N 1°27′48″W

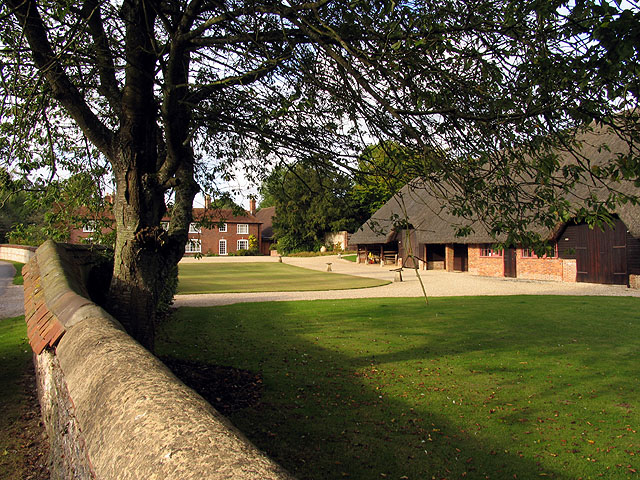
Netherton Farm

Netherton is a hamlet in northwest Hampshire, England. According to the Post Office the population of the 2011 Census was included in the civil parish of Faccombe. It is the site of a late Anglo-Saxon and medieval manorial complex, the remains of which are on private property with nothing remaining above ground.
