= Combe Hill, Berkshire =

Hill in Berkshire, England

Combe Hill
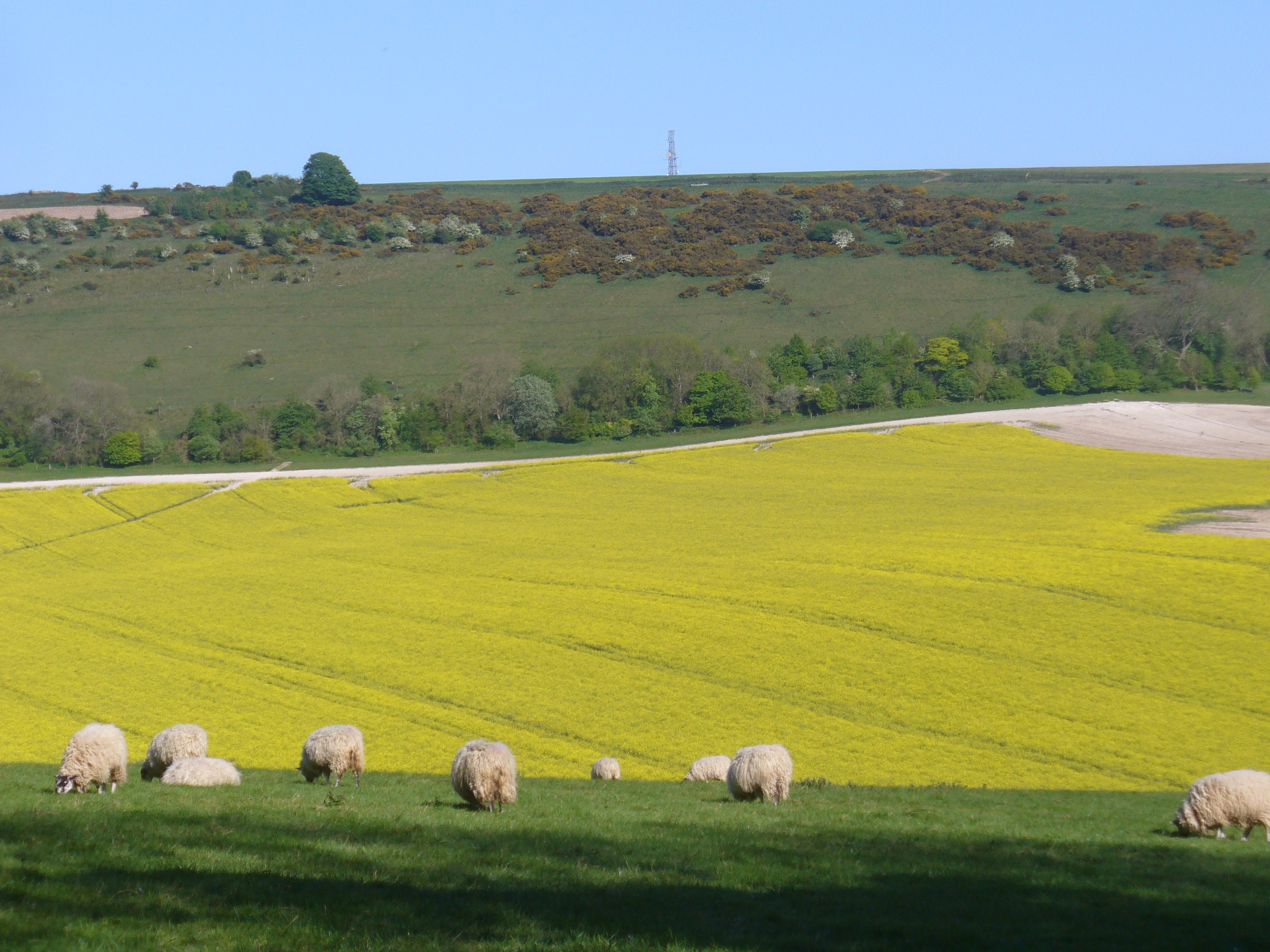
- Combe Hill seen from near Combe village

Highest point
- Elevation: 293 m (961 ft)
- Coordinates: 51.342715°N 1.452124°W

Geography
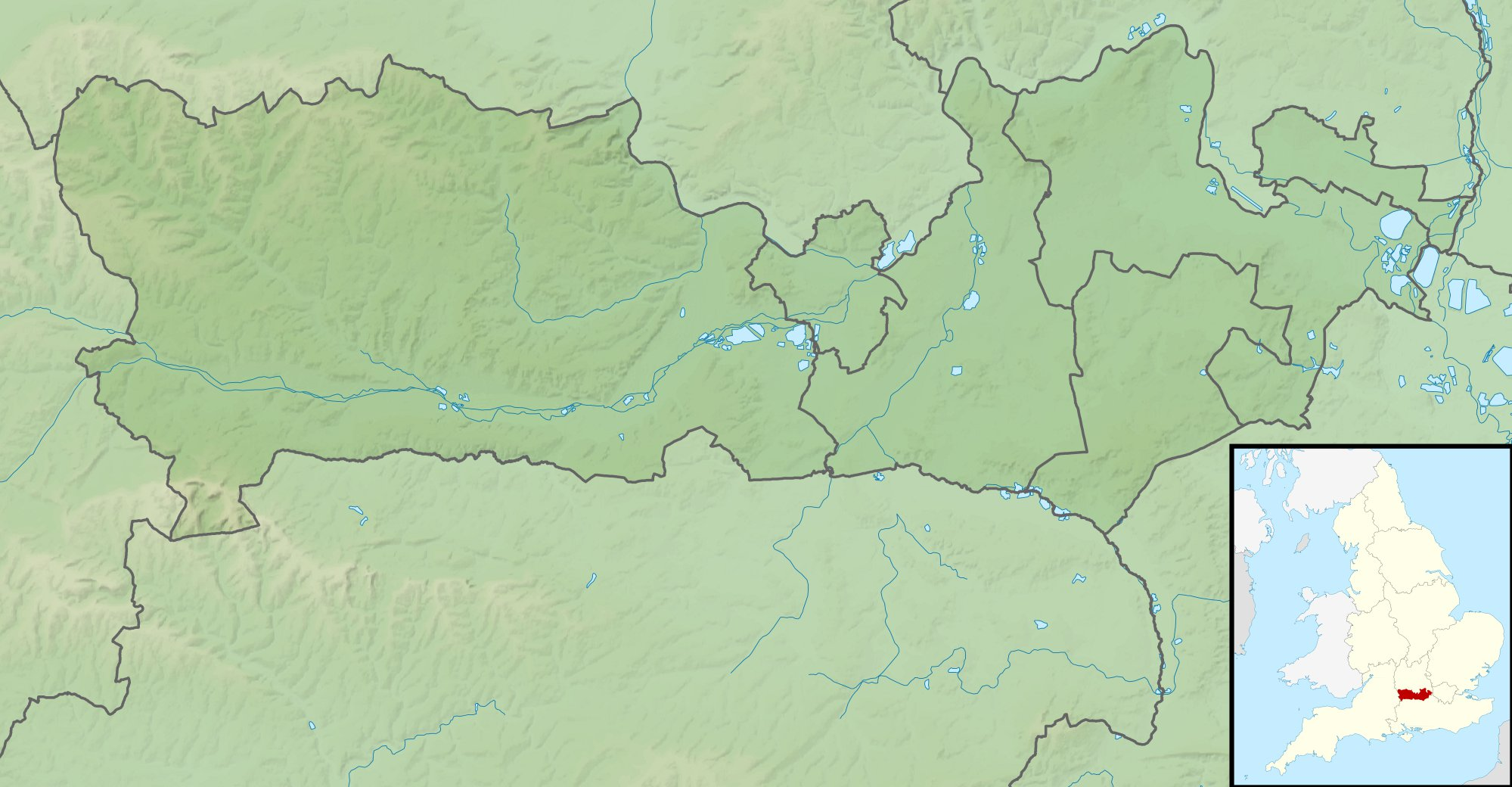
- Location within Berkshire
- Location: Berkshire, England
- Parent range: North Hampshire Downs
- OS grid: SU382606
- Topo map: OS Explorer 158

Combe Hill is a summit in Berkshire, England, with a maximum elevation of 293 m (961 ft). It lies around 1 mile (1.6 km) to the south-east of Walbury Hill, the county top of Berkshire, which is 297 m (974 ft) high. The hill is about 7 miles (11 km) southwest of Newbury on the Hampshire/Berkshire border and is part of the north-facing scarp of the North Hampshire Downs, a chalk ridge within the North Wessex Downs Area of Outstanding Natural Beauty.

The hill lies within the civil parishes of Combe (which includes the summit), East Woodhay and Faccombe. Combe is within the unitary authority area of West Berkshire and the ceremonial county of Berkshire, East Woodhay is within the district of Basingstoke and Deane in the administrative county of Hampshire, and Faccombe is in the Hampshire district of Test Valley.
