= Patrick Kay =

Royal Marines officer (1921–2013)

Major-General Patrick Kay CB MBE
- Born: 1 August 1921; Blakeney, Norfolk
- Died: 19 September 2013 (aged 92)
- Military career
- Allegiance: United Kingdom
- Branch: Royal Marines
- Service years: 1940–1974
- Rank: Major-General
- Commands: Amphibious Training Unit; 43 Commando
- Conflicts: Second World War: Normandy landings; Operation Infatuate; Cold War
- Awards: Companion of the Order of the Bath; Member of the Order of the British Empire

Major-General Patrick Richard Kay, CB, MBE (1 August 1921 – 19 September 2013) was a senior Royal Marines officer and civil servant. He served as commanding officer of 43 Commando, commanding officer of the Amphibious Training Unit and chief of staff, Royal Marines. Following retirement from the military, he became director of naval security and then secretary of the Defence, Press and Broadcasting Advisory Committee.

== Early life ==
Kay was born on 1 August 1921 in Blakeney, Norfolk, England. He was educated at Eastbourne College, a private school in Eastbourne, East Sussex.

== Military career ==
Kay was commissioned into the Royal Marines in January 1940. From 1941, he served at sea on the battlecruiser HMS Renown in the Mediterranean and in the Arctic. On 10 March 1942, he was confirmed in the rank of lieutenant and given seniority from 14 June 1941. He left HMS Renown and joined the 4th Special Service Brigade on its creation in early 1944. As the brigade liaison officer attached to 41 Commando, he took part in the Normandy landings. In August 1944, he was sent to 46 Commando as brigade liaison officer but was made a troop commander because of the loss of many of the battalion's officers. He was made an acting captain on 25 August 1944. In November 1944, he was the staff captain in charge of supplies during Operation Infatuate, the battle for the island of Walcheren, the Netherlands. The navy could not reach the island to re-supply the Allied troops, but his careful organisation allowed the attack to continue. Kay was severely wounded during the operation when his vehicle hit a mine and was evacuated. He was appointed a Member of the Order of the British Empire in 1945.

Following the end of the Second World War, Kay joined Combined Operations Headquarters. In 1948, he joined the staff of the Commandant General Royal Marines for two years. On 27 September 1948, he relinquished the rank of acting major and reverted to acting captain with seniority from 25 August 1944. On 14 June 1949, he was promoted to captain. He attended the Staff College, Camberley before returning to the Commandant's staff for a further two years. In 1954, he joined 40 Commando who were based in Malta.

Kay was made local major on 29 April 1957, and promoted to that rank on 29 December 1957. He was promoted to lieutenant colonel on 31 December 1962. He was made local colonel on 5 July 1966. He was made local major general on 15 June 1970 and acting major general on 27 July 1970. On 8 October 1970, he was promoted to major general.

Kay was appointed a Companion of the Order of the Bath in the 1972 New Year Honours. He retired from the Royal Marines on 1 May 1974.

== Later life ==
Kay became Director of Naval Security in 1974. This followed his retirement from the military and the death of Colonel Jack MacAfee, the previous incumbent of the post. During his time in the post, he reviewed and improved the Royal Navy's internal security.

Kay died on 19 September 2013, aged 92.
