= Alex Simcox =

English cricketer (born 1979)

Personal information
- Full name: Alexander David Simcox
- Born: 13 December 1979 (age 46); Eastbourne, Sussex, England
- Batting: Right-handed

Domestic team information
- Years: Team
- 2001–2002: Cambridge UCCE
- 2002: Cambridge University

Career statistics
Competition	First-class
Matches	7
Runs scored	128
Batting average	12.80
100s/50s	–/–
Top score	30
Catches/stumpings	5/–
- Source: Cricinfo, 1 September 2020

Alexander David Simcox (born 13 December 1979) is an English former first-class cricketer.

Simcox was born at Eastbourne in December 1979. He was educated in Eastbourne at Eastbourne College, before going up to Robinson College, Cambridge. While studying at Cambridge, he made six appearances in first-class cricket for Cambridge UCCE in 2001–02, which included appearing in the sides inaugural first-class fixture against Kent. (Note: Cambridge UCCE differed from Cambridge University Cricket Club in that it was open to students at Anglia Ruskin University, whereas Cambridge University Cricket Club is exclusively for students of the constituent colleges of the University of Cambridge.) In addition to playing for Cambridge UCCE, Simcox also made a single first-class appearance for Cambridge University against Oxford University in The University Match of 2002. In six matches for Cambridge UCCE, he scored 120 runs at an average of 13.33 and a high score of 30.
