= Cadarache =

French technological research and development center

Coordinates: 43°41′15″N 5°45′43″E

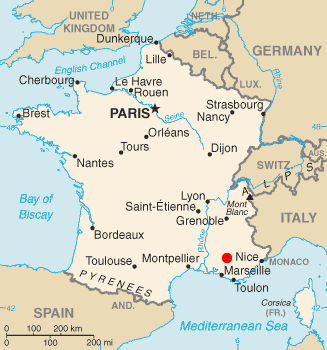
Location of Cadarache (marked in red) in Southern France

Cadarache (French pronunciation: [kadaʁaʃ]) in Southern France is the largest technological research and development centre for energy in Europe. It includes CEA research activities and ITER. CEA Cadarache is one of the research centres of the French Commission of Atomic and Alternative Energies (CEA).

Established in the north of the department of Bouches-du-Rhône, close to the village of Saint-Paul-lès-Durance to the west, CEA Cadarache is located about 40 kilometres (24 mi) from Aix-en-Provence, approximately 60 kilometres (37 mi) northeast of Marseille, standing near the borders of three other departments: the Alpes-de-Haute-Provence, Var and Vaucluse. It is a major source of employment in the Provence-Alpes-Côte d'Azur region and has one of the heaviest concentrations of specialised scientific staff.

Cadarache began its research activities when President Charles de Gaulle launched France's atomic energy programme in 1959. In 2005, Cadarache was selected to be the site of the International Thermonuclear Experimental Reactor (ITER), the world's largest nuclear fusion reactor. Construction of the ITER complex began in 2007, and it is projected to begin plasma-generating operations in the 2020s. Cadarache also plays host to a number of research reactors, such as the Jules Horowitz Reactor, which is expected to enter operation around 2030.

== Facilities ==
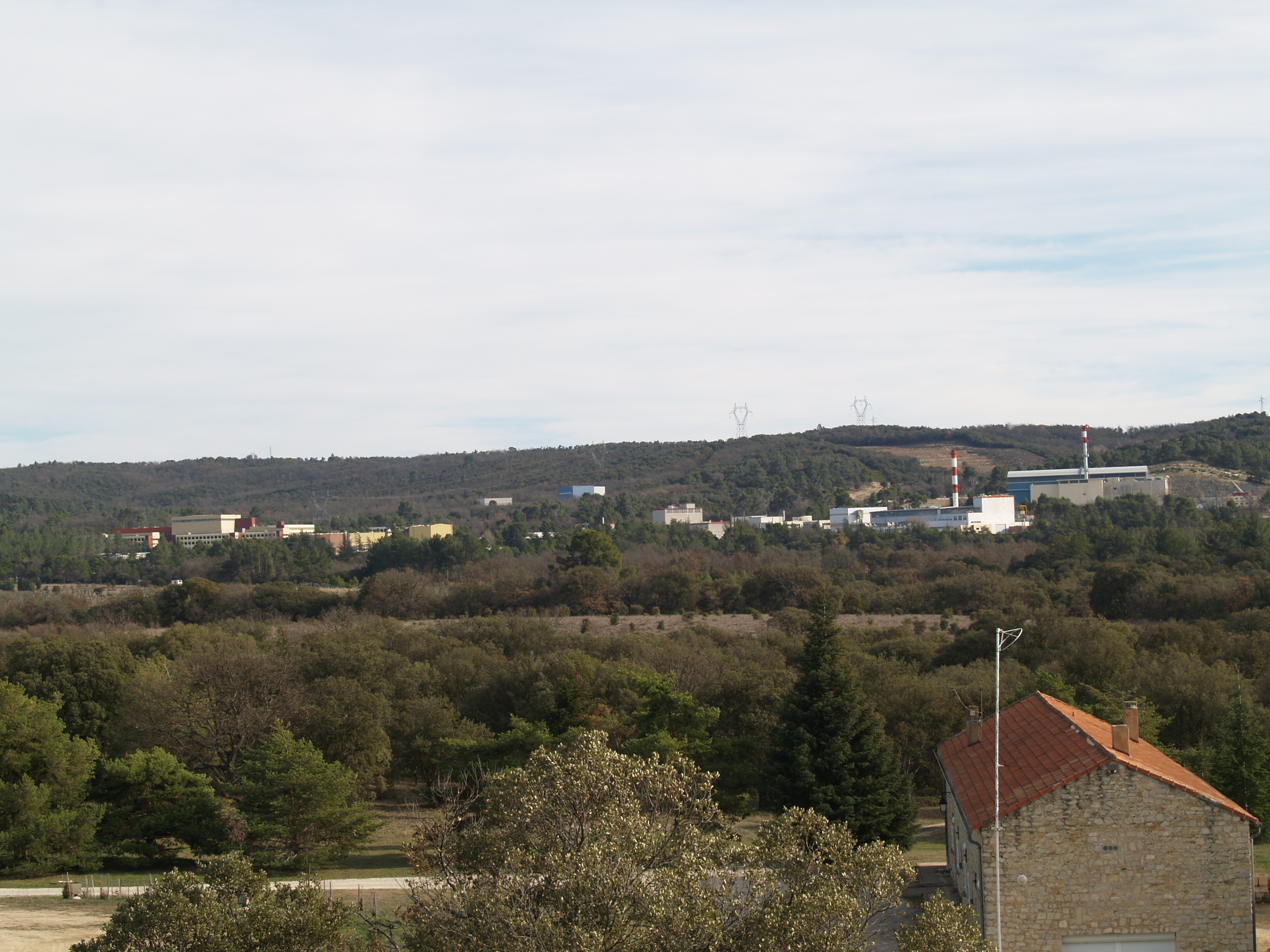
The Cadarache facility in 2008.

The Cadarache center is the largest energy research site in Europe, hosting 19 Basic Nuclear Installations (BNI) and a secret BNI, including reactors, waste stockpiling and recycling facilities, bio-technology facilities and solar platforms. It employs over 5,000 people, and approximately 700 students and foreign collaborators carry out research in the facility's laboratories. ITER, the experimental nuclear fusion tokamak, is currently under construction at Cadarache and is expected to create its first plasma by 2025. When it becomes operational, ITER is hoped to be the first large-scale fusion reactor to produce more energy than is used to initiate its fusion reactions. Other nuclear installations at Cadarache include the Tore Supra tokamak – a predecessor to ITER – and the Jules Horowitz Reactor, a 100-megawatt research reactor which is planned to begin operation in 2030.

== Activities ==
Numerous nuclear research activities are conducted at Cadarache, including mixed-oxide fuel (MOX) production, nuclear propulsion and fission reactor prototyping, nuclear fusion research and research into new forms of fission fuel. Nuclear waste is also treated and recycled at the site.

== Notable incidents ==
A number of incidents, of varying severity, have occurred at Cadarache since its inception. Several incidents are listed below.

- 31 March 1994: A sodium explosion took place while the Rapsodie experimental reactor was being dismantled. The explosion was classified as a Class 2 incident by the ASN.
- 25 September 1998: A sodium fire occurred in a non-nuclear test facility, but caused no significant damage.
- 2 November 2004: A fire broke out in a part of the facility containing radioactive materials, but was contained without causing any radioactive contamination.
- 6 November 2006: A fault in the equipment used to weigh MOX led to a grinder being loaded with more than the authorized amount 8 kg (18 lb) of fissile material, presenting the possible threat of a spontaneous nuclear reaction. Initially classified as a low-priority Class-1 level incident, it was subsequently revised to Class 2 by the ASN.
- 6 October 2009: A higher quantity of plutonium than authorized was uncovered in the Plutonium Technology Workshop. The ASN classified the incident as Class 2, and suspended dismantling work on the workshop. After investigation, it was revealed that the cause of the incident was the accumulation between 1966 and 2004 of fine plutonium dust in the 450 glove boxes in the workshop.

== Seismological risk ==
Cadarache is situated on the Aix-en-Provence-Durance seismological fault, and lies close to another fault, Trévaresse. The Aix-Durance fault caused France's worst recorded earthquake in 1909 (measuring 6.2 on the surface-wave magnitude scale). In a 2000 report, the ASN mandated the closure of six installations at Cadarache that did not meet aseismic construction standards; a similar report was issued by a French nuclear safety organization in 1994. By 2010, three of these had been shut down, with the remaining three to be shut down by 2015.

== See also ==
- National Ignition Facility
- Nuclear energy in France
- List of satellite map images with missing or unclear data
