= Jules Horowitz =

French physicist

Jules Horowitz (3 October 1921 – 3 August 1995) was a French physicist. The Jules Horowitz Reactor is named after him.

== Biography ==
Jules Horowitz was born to a Polish Jewish family in Rzeszów, Poland. His parents, most likely in order to seek refuge for their children and themselves from the antisemitism in strongly catholic Poland, emigrated to Weimar Germany. However, some years later they resumed their exodus westwards to escape the National Socialist regime, ending up at Metz. They then moved once again to avoid living under the Nazi regime occupying France, leaving Lorraine for the Zone libre.

In 1941, Horowitz passed the entrance exam for L'Ecole Polytechnique. The school had, since June 1940, abandoned its former location on the rue Descartes in Paris to move to Lyon and the Zone libre, and loses its military status. When the school returned to Paris in April 1943 after the invasion of the Zone Libre by the Germans in November 1942, Horowitz probably stayed in the south like his fellow students (denoted "bis" by the administration), having been naturalised at least 8 years earlier and being of Jewish faith.

A great contributor to nuclear physics through his work at the heart of the Commissariat à l'énergie atomique (CEA), he acted as director of the Department for Atomic Piles for the construction of the Zoé reactor (the first French atomic reactor). He applied his common sense to identify the deception in the Great Oil Sniffer Hoax.

He was, in 1975, the creator and first director of the Institute of Fundamental Physics research at CEA, renamed Material Science Research, and today called La Direction de la recherche fondamentale (DRF). Instigator of the Laue-Langevin Institute i the early 1960s, he was also president of the board of directors at the European Synchrotron Radiation Facility during its creation (1988 to 1993).

He was presented as one of the major actors behind the Israeli nuclear programme. He was furthermore the brother-in-law of the French physicist Claude Bloch.
