= Hugh Prince (British Army officer) =

Hugh Prince CBE
- Born: 11 August 1911
- Died: 6 November 2005 (aged 94)
- Military career
- Allegiance: United Kingdom
- Branch: British Army Indian Army
- Rank: Major-General
- Conflicts: Second World War
- Awards: Commander of the Order of the British Empire

Major-General Hugh Anthony Prince CBE (11 August 1911 – 6 November 2005) was an Indian Army and British Army officer who became Chief of the Military Planning Office for the Southeast Asia Treaty Organization.

== Military career (Indian Army) ==
The son of Dr H. T. Prince FRCS LRCP, Prince was educated at Eastbourne College and the Royal Military College, Sandhurst. He won a cadet scholarship to Sandhurst and distinguished himself there in physical training. Prince was appointed to the Unattached List of the Indian Army on 27 August 1931. He was admitted into the Indian Army and appointed to the 2nd battalion 6th Gurkha Rifles on 22 October 1932. Promoted Lieutenant 27 November 1933, he was appointed Quartermaster 9 November 1935 then Adjutant 1 November 1938. Identified in contemporary photos on exchange duties with the Royal Canadian Regiment in Camp Niagara, Ontario 1936 through summer 1937 and commemorated with a spectacular trophy of a dinner bell mounted between two polished cow horns. Promoted Captain 27 August 1939. He took part in operations on the North West Frontier of India during the period 1937–39.

He was appointed General Staff Officer 3rd grade (Operations) 3 September 1937 – 30 April 1940, Air Intelligence Liaison Officer 15 November 1940 – 15 September 1941, General Staff Officer 3rd grade (Air) 16 September 1941 – 15 February 1942, General Staff Officer 2nd grade (Air) 16 February 1942 – 9 August 1943. He was Brigade-Major to an Indian Infantry Brigade 10 August 1943 – 30 January 1944 and General Staff Officer 1st grade (Plans), H. Q., S.A.C.S.E.A. 15 July 1944 to 21 May 1945. He was Instructor (G. S. O. 2nd grade) Staff College Quetta 25 November 1945 – 16 June 1947 and was appointed acting Major 16 February 1942 – 15 May 1942, temporary Major 16 May 1942 – 17 July 1943 & 30 January 1944 – 29 April 1944 and War Substantive Major 30 April 1944. He was promoted to Major on 1 July 1946. He was Acting Lieutenant-Colonel 30 January 1944 – 29 April 1944 and temporary Lieutenant-Colonel 30 April 1944 – 22 November 1947.

Prince was Mentioned in Despatches (London Gazette – 17 December 1942).

== Military career (British Army) ==
Prince transferred to The King's Regiment (Liverpool) 23 November 1947. He was appointed temporary Lieutenant-Colonel 9 December 1948 to 24 May 1953 and S.C.O. (S. O. 1), B. T. B. 9 December 1948 – 24 April 1949. He was General Staff Officer 1st grade War Office 5 May 1949 – 9 August 1950 and Assistant Adjutant & Quarter Master General to an Infantry Division as part of the British Army on the Rhine, Germany 9 April 1951 – 4 February 1953.

Prince was promoted to Lieutenant-Colonel 16 January 1954 and was Temporary Brigadier 5 July 1956 to 13 June 1961. He was appointed to command a brigade as part of Western Command 5 July 1956 to 8 July 59 and was promoted to Colonel 14 June 1957. He was D. D. P. S. (A.), War Office 7 September 1959 to 27 February 1961 and was appointed CBE (Military Division) in the London Gazette of 31 December 1960.

He was promoted to the rank of Brigadier 14 June 1961 and Brigadier, A/Q. H. Q. Eastern Command 24 March 1961 to 28 February 1964. He was appointed to Major-General 1 July 1964 (with seniority 2 May 1964) and was Chief of the Military Planning Office, S. E. A. T. O. 1 July 1964 in Bangkok.

He retired on 17 October 1966.

== Family ==
He married in firstly, in 1938, Elizabeth, daughter of Dr Walter Bapty, of Victoria B.C. His first wife died in 1959. There were two sons of the first marriage - John and Anthony. He married secondly, in 1959, Claude-Andree, daughter of Andre Romanet, by whom he had a son.

He died at Arles, France in November 2005, aged 94: the funeral took place at Chester Cathedral on 18 November 2005.

== Sources ==
- The Times, death notice section
- The Army Gradiation List, February 1965
- Indian Army List (various dates)
- London Gazette
