= Mynott =

Mynott is a surname. Notable people with this surname include:

- Adam Mynott (born 1957), English radio journalist
- Brian Mynott (born 1944), English-born Australian rules footballer
- Lawrence Mynott (born 1954), English book illustrator, designer, and portrait painter
- Simon Mynott (1876–1924), New Zealand rugby union player
- Terry Mynott (born 1974), English comedian, actor, impressionist, and singer
