= Brian Crozier =

British journalist and intelligence expert (1918–2012)

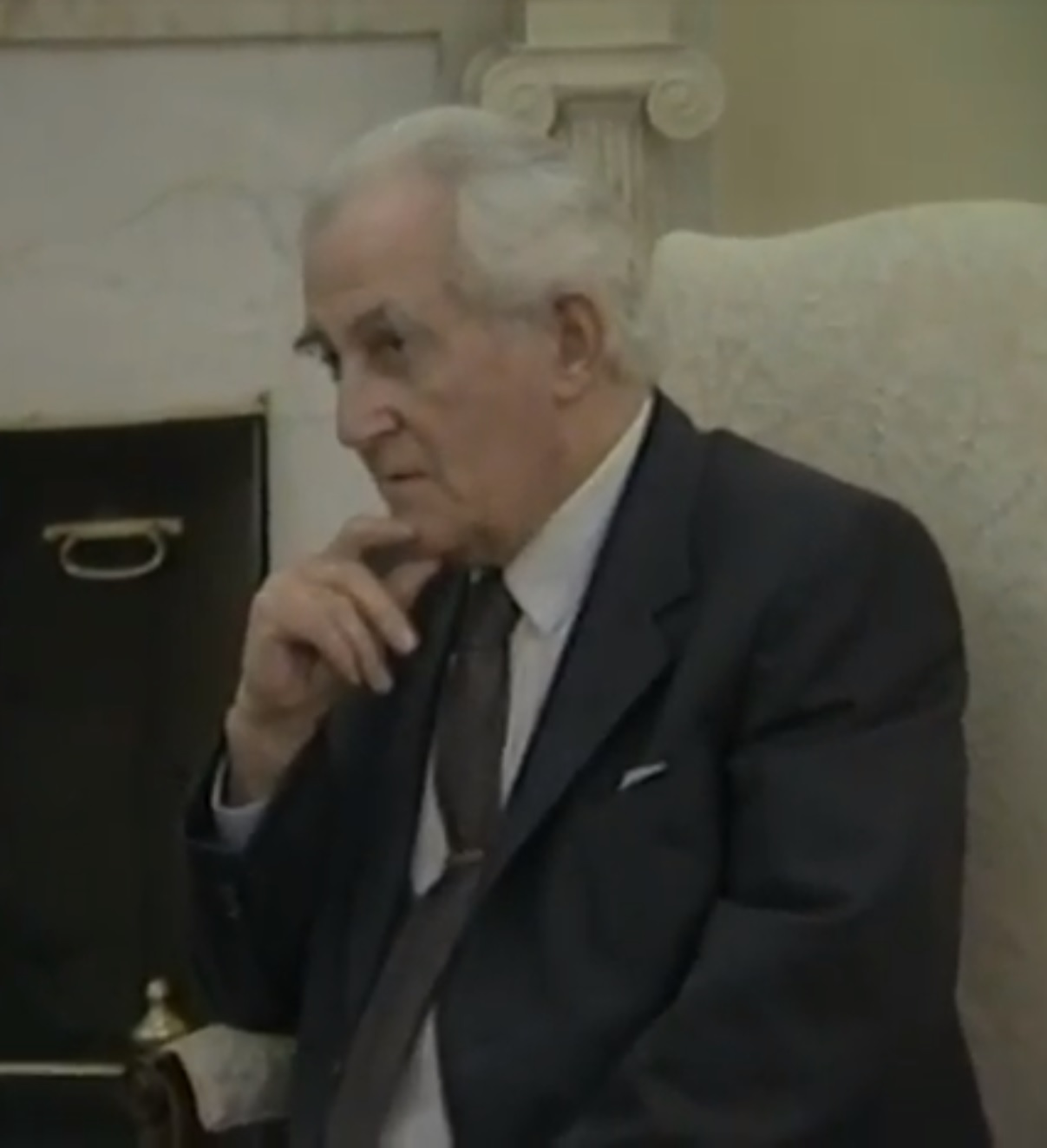
Journalist and strategist Brian Crozier in the Oval Office for a meeting with President Reagan in 1985

Brian Rossiter Crozier (4 August 1918 – 4 August 2012) was a British historian, propagandist and journalist. He was also one of the central staff members of a secret propaganda department belonging to the UK Foreign Office, known as the Information Research Department (IRD) which republished and supported much of his work.

== Early life ==
Crozier was born in a small village in Shire of Cloncurry, Australia, where his father worked as mining engineer. In 1923, his family moved to France. In 1930, they moved to England, where he received a scholarship to study piano and composition at the Trinity College of Music in London. Early in life he believed in communism, as a reaction to the Great Depression and to Adolf Hitler, but he later changed his philosophy and worked to combat communism.

== Career ==
Crozier eventually became interested in journalism and pursued a career that led him to become a foreign correspondent for Reuters, a columnist for The Economist, a reporter for the BBC and, during a brief return to Australia, a writer for Sydney Morning Herald.

Crozier worked as the director of Forum World Features, set up in 1966 by the Congress for Cultural Freedom, which had ties to the American Central Intelligence Agency (CIA). While editing the Economist's "insider" news sheet Foreign Report, Crozier, as he later recorded in his memoirs, kept some of the best stories that reached him for the CIA. He stated in 1975 that Forum World Features had broken all ties to the CIA when he became its director in the 1960s.

In 1970, Crozier founded the Institute for the Study of Conflict, based in London, to study insurgencies and terrorism. He presided over it for most of the 1970s. According to a profile written by David Rees in 1985 for the American fortnightly National Review "the Institute... was the first private think-tank devoted to the study of terrorism and subversion". Under his direction (he left in 1979) the institute specialised in the study of the "peacetime" strategy of the Soviet Union. Its analyses, including the Annual of Power and Conflict, which it published for ten years, have been used in war colleges throughout the West.

For many years, Crozier wrote a regular column, "The Protracted Conflict", in the National Review. Joseph D'Agostino of Human Events stated, "Crozier has another distinction: in 1988 he appeared in the Guinness Book of World Records for having interviewed the most heads of state or government, 58 in all".

Crozier provided advice to the British Secret Intelligence Service, to the Information Research Department (IRD) of the British Foreign Office, and to the CIA. Lecturing to Britain's staff college for army officers during the early 1970s, when the Labour Party was in power under Harold Wilson, Crozier stated if the government went "too far", it was the armed forces' duty to intervene (he claimed that he was enthusiastically applauded). In 1982, it was revealed from the papers of a former Bavarian state security chief, Hans Langemann, that Crozier was an attendant of Le Cercle and headed a secret international group that tried to influence the West German federal election of 1980 by using secret-service connections and cover-up financial transactions to make Franz Josef Strauß Chancellor of the Federal Republic of Germany.

Crozier was a co-founder of the group The 61, an organisation that wanted to counter Soviet communist propaganda.

HarperCollins published Crozier's autobiography, Free Agent: The Unseen War 1941–1991, in 1993, which was revised and corrected in paperback edition in 1994.

Crozier was a Distinguished Visiting Fellow on War, Revolution, and Peace of the Hoover Institution. He was also a member of the international advisory council of the Victims of Communism Memorial Foundation. In 1985, he signed a petition in support for the far-right paramilitary Contras (Nicaragua).

== Personal life ==
Crozier was married twice. He had three daughters (Kathryn-Anne, Isobel and Caroline) and a son (Michael).

He died on 4 August 2012 after a long illness at 94.

== Selected works ==
External videos
- Washington Journal interview with Crozier on The Rise and Fall of the Soviet Empire, 14 November 1999. C-SPAN.

=== Books ===
- The Rebels: A Study of Postwar Insurrections. Boston: Beacon Press (1960). ISBN 978-1258501716.
- The Morning After: A Study of Independence. London: Methuen (1963). ISBN 978-1135351274.
- South East Asia in Turmoil. London: Penguin (1965). ISBN 978-0684129969.
- The Struggle for the Third World. Chester Springs, Penn.: Dufour Editions (1966). ISBN 978-0802310354.
- Franco: A Biographical History. Boston: Little, Brown (1967). ISBN 978-0413267702.
- Masters of Power. Boston: Little, Brown (1969). LCCN 77-79368.
- Since Stalin: An Assessment of Communist Power. New York: Coward-McCann (1970). LCCN 78-136438.
- De Gaulle. New York: Charles Scribner's Sons (1973). ISBN 978-0684129969.
- A Theory of Conflict. New York: Charles Scribner's Sons (1974). ISBN 978-0241024584.
- The Man Who Lost China: The First Full Biography of Chiang Kai-shek. New York: Charles Scribner's Sons (1976). ISBN 978-0684146867.
- Strategy of Survival. London: Temple Smith (1978). ISBN 978-0851171432.
- This War Called Peace, with Drew Middleton and Jeremy Murray-Brown. Universe Books (1985). ISBN 978-0876634639.
- The Gorbachev Phenomenon: Peace and the Secret War. Great Britain: Claridge Press (1990). ISBN 978-1870626217.
- Free Agent: The Unseen War, 1941-1991. London: HarperCollins (1993). ISBN 978-0060171179.
- The KGB Lawsuits. Great Britain: Claridge Press (1995). ISBN 978-1870626026.
- The Rise and Fall of the Soviet Empire. Rocklin, Calif.: Forum, with National Review (1999). ISBN 978-0761520573.
- The Other Brian Croziers. Great Britain: Claridge Press (2002). ISBN 978-1870626644.
- Political Victory: The Elusive Prize of Military Wars. New Jersey: Transaction Publishers (2005). ISBN 978-0765802903.

=== Book contributions ===
- "South-East Asia" (Chapter 6). In: The Cold War: A Reappraisal, by Evan Luard. New York: Praeger (1964). LCCN 64-25786.
- "Der Spiegel: Confirmation from the East." In: Counter Culture, vol. 2, by Sir James Goldsmith (1993), pp. 99–105.

=== Articles ===
- "The Diem Regime in Southern Vietnam." Far Eastern Survey, vol. 24, no. 4 (Apr. 1955), pp. 49–56. doi:10.2307/3023970.
- "The International Situation in Indochina." Pacific Affairs, vol. 29, no. 4 (Dec. 1956), pp. 309–323. JSTOR 3035143.
- "France and Algeria," with Gerard Mansell. International Affairs, bol. 36, no. 3 (July 1960), pp. 310–321. doi:10.2307/2610008. A discussion at Chatham House, March 8, 1960.
- "Peking and the Laotian Crisis: An Interim Appraisal." China Quarterly, no. 7 (Jul./Sep. 1961), pp. 128–137. JSTOR 763326.
- "Indonesia: Retrospect and Prospect." World Today, vol. 18, no. 7 (July 1962), pp. 295–304. JSTOR 40393419.
- "Peking and the Laotian Crisis: A Further Appraisal." China Quarterly, no. 11 (Jul./Sep. 1962), pp. 116–123. JSTOR 651454.
- "The Communist Struggle for Power in Burma." World Today, vol. 20, no. 3 (Mar. 1964), pp. 105–112. JSTOR 40393589.
- "The Struggle for the Third World." International Affairs, vol. 40, no. 3 (Jul. 1964), pp. 440–452. doi:10.2307/2610827.
- "Latin America." Encounter (Feb. 1965).
- "The Study of Conflict." Institute for the Study of Conflict (1967).
- "The Conflict of Information: 'Detente', Freedom & Constraint," with Leonid Vladimirov. Conflict Studies (1975). Institute for the Study of Conflict. ISBN 978-0903366274. ISSN 0069-8792.
- "Russia's Revolutionary Base." New Lugano Review, vol. 2, no. 8-12 (1976).
- "My Pilgrimage to Kent (Connecticut)." New Lugano Review, vol. 2, no. 11-12 (1976). pp. 8–24.
- "Pour une bribe d'empire." Revue des Deux Mondes (Apr. 1989), pp. 249–253. JSTOR 44185802.
- "Creating 'A Lot on Her Hands,'" with Helen Gregory. Labour History, no. 85 (Nov. 2003), pp. 89–101. doi:10.2307/27515929.

=== Reports ===
- The Ulster Debate: Report of a Study Group of the Institute for the Study of Conflict (1972), with James Camlin Beckett and Robert Moss. London: The Bodley Head for the Institute for the Study of Conflict. ISBN 978-0370103891.

=== Book reviews ===
- Review of La Fin d'une guerre: Indochine 1954, by Jean Lacouture & Philippe Devillers. International Affairs, vol. 37, no. 2 (Apr. 1961), pp. 264–265. doi:10.2307/2611931.
- Review of Indonesia: A Profile, by Jeane S. Mintz. Pacific Affairs, vol. 35, no. 2 (Summer 1962), pp. 184–185. doi:10.2307/2753261.
- Review of The Story of Indonesia, by Louis Fischer; The Beginnings of the Indonesian-Dutch Negotiations and the Hoge Veluwe Talks, by Idrus Nasir Djajadiningrat. Pacific Affairs, vol. 35, no. 2 (Summer 1962), pp. 185–186. doi:10.2307/2753262.

== In the media ==
Crozier was interviewed for a 1999 film by Peter Graves for A&E Network's Biography series, Chiang Kai-shek: The Battle for China, including other contributors such as John Stewart Service.

He also appeared in The Mayfair Set, a 1999 four-part documentary series about the rise of business and the decline of political power, written and directed by Adam Curtis for BBC. He appeared in episode three, "Destroy the Technostructure," which Curtis described as "the story of how Sir James Goldsmith, through a series of corporate raids, became one of the world's richest men and a victim of his own success."
