= Eastbourne College =

Public school in Eastbourne, East Sussex, England

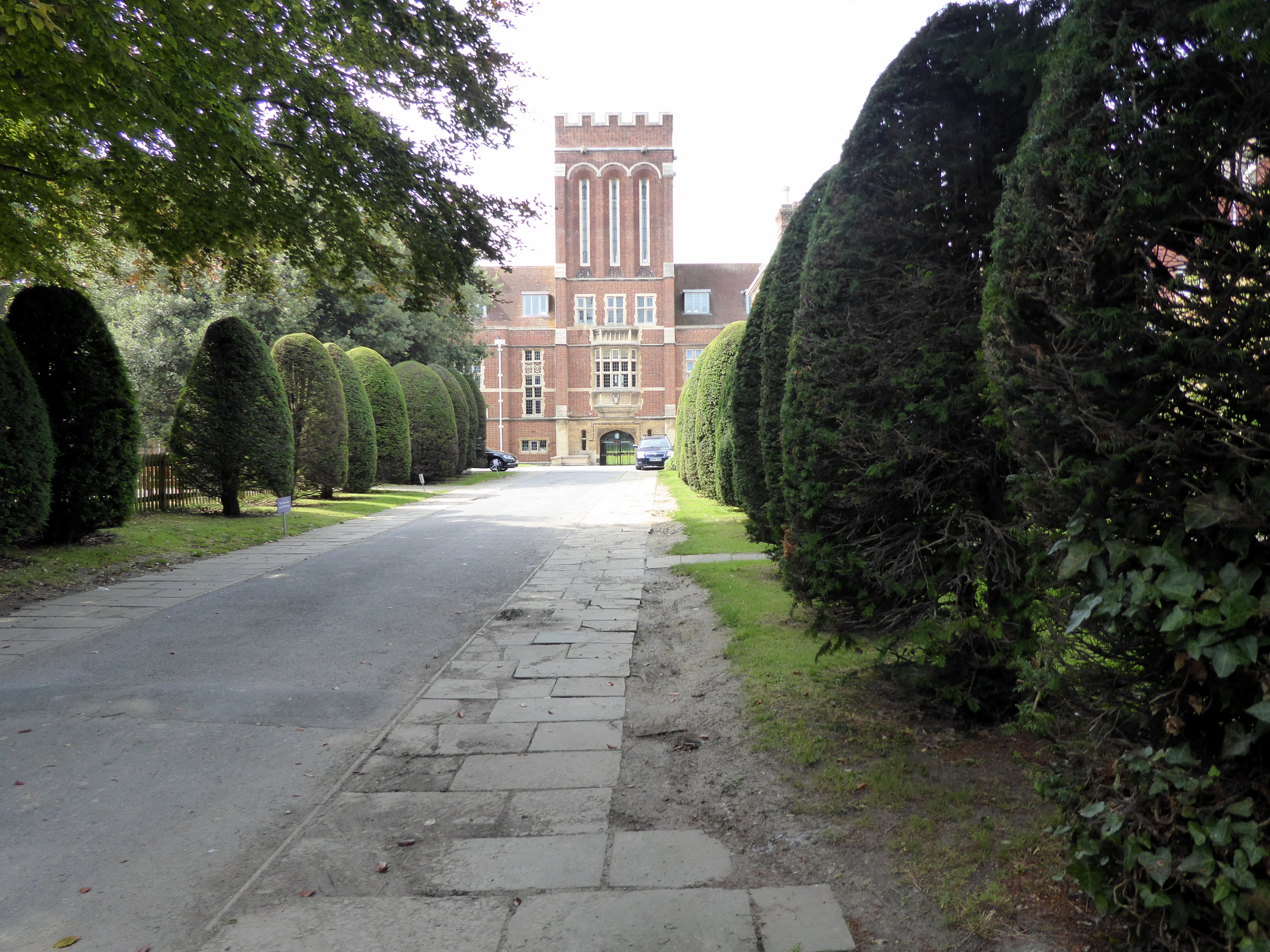
- An entrance to Eastbourne College

Location
- Old Wish Road; Eastbourne, East Sussex, BN21 4JY; England
- Coordinates: 50.7627°N 0.2811°E

Information
- Type: Public school Private day and boarding
- Motto: Ex oriente salus ("The haven [the bourne] from the East")
- Religious affiliation: Church of England
- Established: 1867
- Founders: William Cavendish, 7th Duke of Devonshire and other prominent Eastbourne citizens
- Local authority: East Sussex County Council
- Department for Education URN: 114650 Tables
- Ofsted: Reports
- President: Peregrine Cavendish, 12th Duke of Devonshire
- Chairman of the College Council: Nicky Eckert
- Headmaster: Tom Lawson
- Chaplain: Daniel Merceron
- Staff: 200~
- Gender: Co-educational
- Age: 13 to 18
- Enrolment: 600~
- Houses: 5 day, 5 boarding
- Colours: Eastbourne Navy; Eastbourne Red
- Mascot: Stag
- Publication: The Eastbournian; The Old Eastbournian
- Alumni: Old Eastbournians
- Website: eastbourne-college.co.uk

Eastbourne College is a co-educational fee-charging school in the English public school tradition, for boarding and day pupils aged 13–18, in the town of Eastbourne in East Sussex on the south coast of England. The college's headmaster is Tom Lawson.

== Overview ==
The college was founded by William Cavendish, 7th Duke of Devonshire, and other prominent Eastbourne citizens in 1867.

The college is in the Lower Meads area of Eastbourne, a mainly residential area. Most of the school buildings are on a central campus area but many others are scattered in the immediate vicinity, such as the Beresford hockey and the links rugby pitches.

The motto, Ex Oriente Salus, is a play on "Eastbourne", meaning "The haven [the bourne] from the East". Salus also means health or salvation, the latter making an allusion to Christ, who came, from the English point of view, from the east.

== History ==
Charles Hayman, an Eastbourne medical practitioner and member of the town's first council, together with other prominent local citizens, decided an independent school should be established and the support of William Cavendish, 7th Duke of Devonshire, was sought. He was supportive of the venture and provided 12 acres (5 hectares) of land for purchase at a modest price. This link with the Cavendish family is evidenced by the stag in the arms of the school.

From 1867 to 1869, it occupied Ellesmere Villa, now called Spencer Court; the location is now marked by a blue plaque. Architect Henry Currey was assigned by the duke to design a new school building, and College House, now School House, was built in 1870. The school chapel was constructed that same year.

During the 1880s, the school went through an impoverished period. Through the intervention of George Wallis, first mayor of Eastbourne and the work of new headmaster Charles Crowden, formerly of Cranbrook School, the school was saved from financial disaster.

The college admitted its first girls in 1969 when the sixth form became coeducational, becoming one of the first HMC schools to admit girls. The college is now fully coeducational.

In 2005 the school was one of fifty of the country's leading private schools which were found guilty of running an illegal price-fixing cartel, exposed by The Times, which had allowed them to drive up fees for thousands of parents. Each school was required to pay a nominal penalty of £10,000 and all agreed to make ex-gratia payments totalling three million pounds into a trust designed to benefit pupils who attended the schools during the period in respect of which fee information was shared.

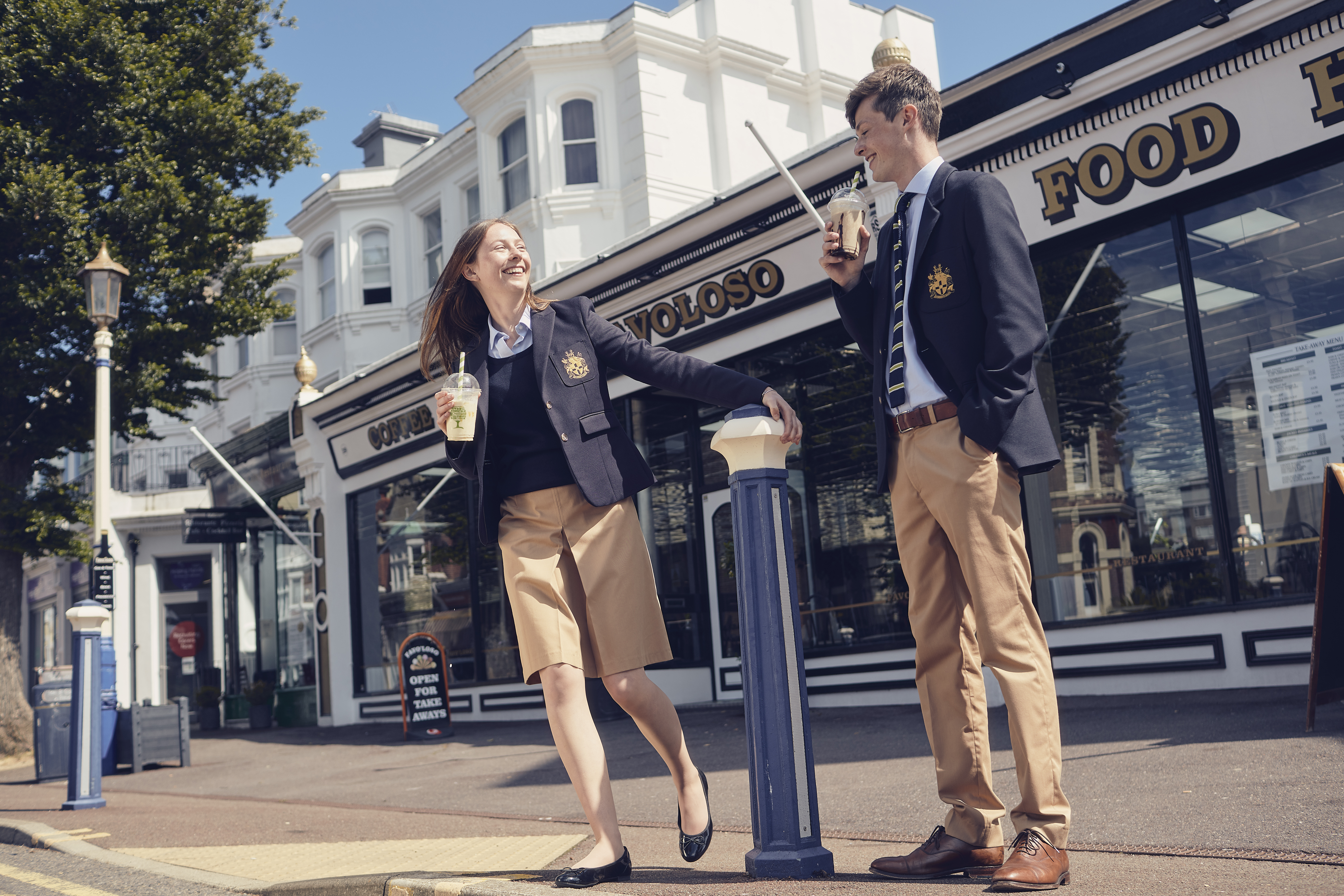
Uniform

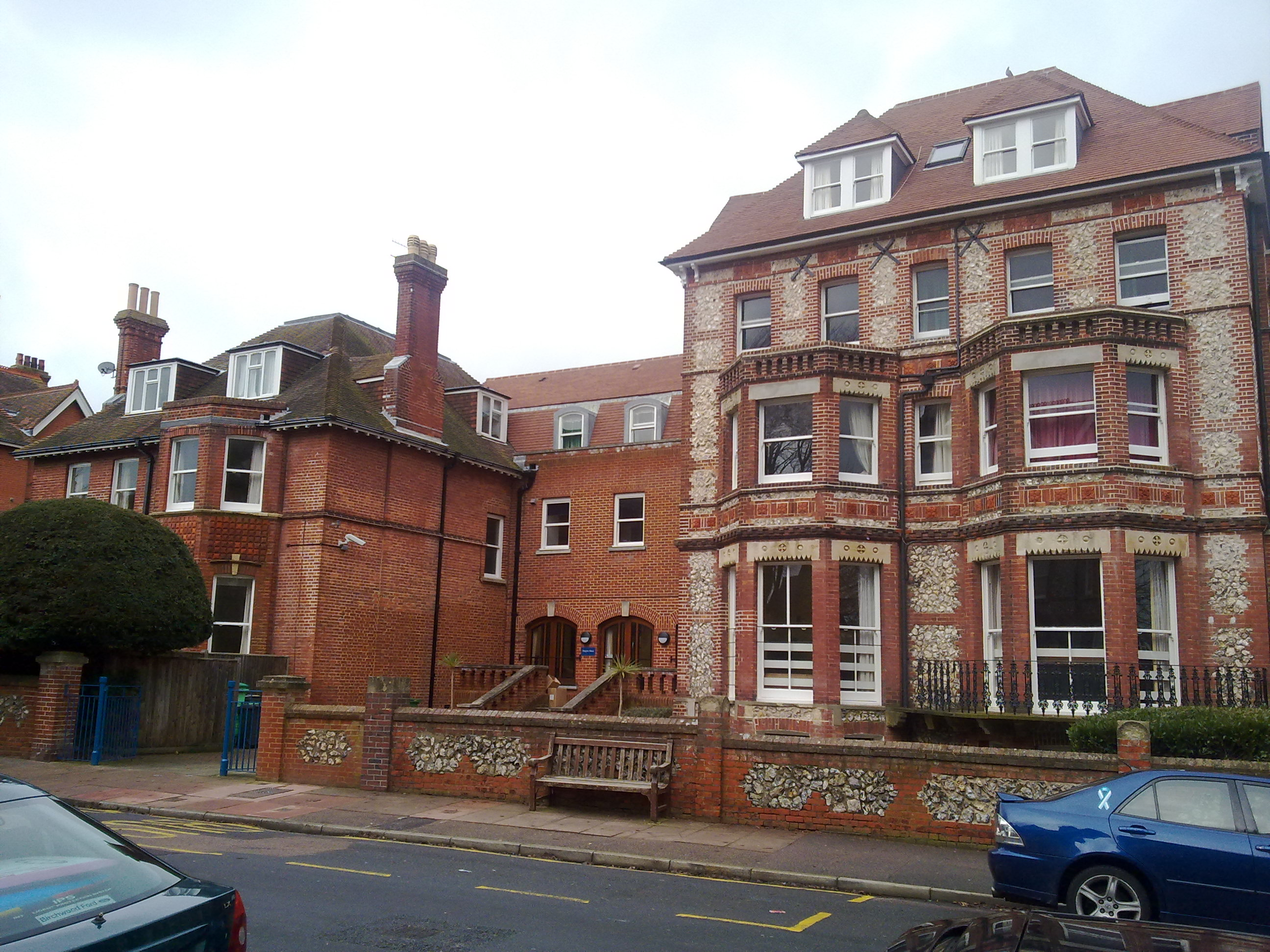
Front view of the Wargrave House

== Boarding and day houses ==
Boarding houses

- Gonville (boys)
- Nugent (girls)
- Pennell (boys)
- School (girls)
- Wargrave (boys)

Day houses

- Blackwater (girls)
- Craig (boys)
- Powell (boys)
- Reeves (boys)
- Watt (girls)

Former houses

- Arnold (mixed; flexi boarding)

Many of these houses were donated to the school in wills and named after their benefactors; for example, Powell was given to the college by Stanley Powell.

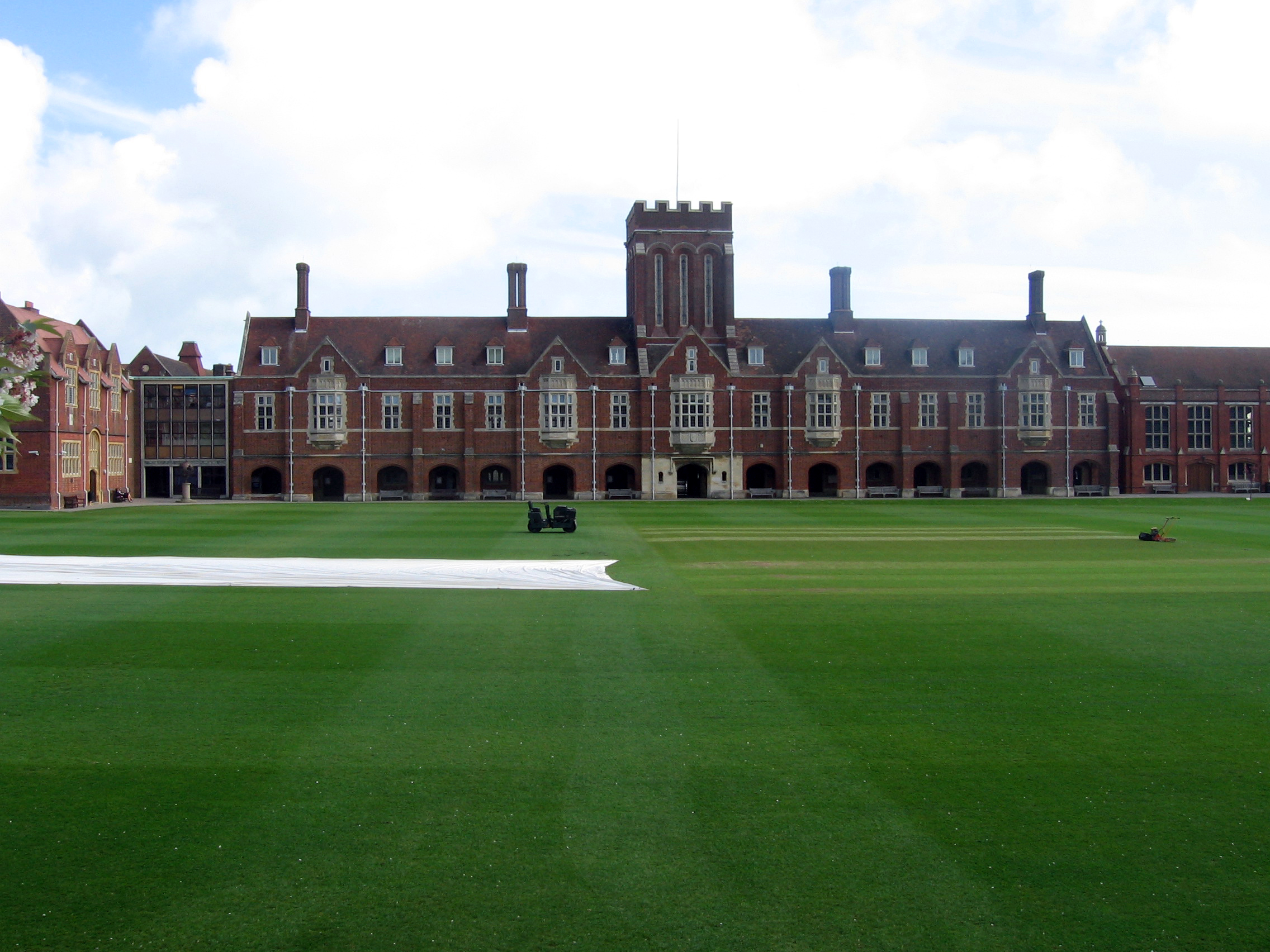
Eastbourne College in 2008

== Extracurricular activities ==
=== Combined Cadet Force ===
The school's CCF corps was founded in 1896.

=== Sport ===
Sport is played at the many facilities around the college (including College Field which has been used for training by teams such as South Africa upon arrival in the UK and some internationals) and at various locations around the town acquired by the college. Former pupils who have achieved sporting success include rugby players Hugo Southwell (Scotland and London Wasps) and Mark Lock (Leeds Tykes), and cricket player Ed Giddins.

Each term at the college has a single primary sport:

Term	Boys	Girls
Michaelmas	Rugby union	Hockey
Lent	Hockey	Netball
Summer	Cricket	Tennis

There are also alternative sports, including football, cross country, swimming, golf, tennis, squash, rowing, sailing, rugby fives, fives, and rounders. The school owns a boat house nearby the campus.

== Birley Centre ==
On 17 October 2011, Gus Christie, chairman of the Glyndebourne Festival Opera, opened the Birley Centre. It was named after Michael Birley, former headmaster of Eastbourne College (1956–1970), and now has facilities such as a recording studio and a state of the art theatre space.

== In popular culture ==
The Southern Railway made great use of steam locomotive names for publicity, and the carrying of pupils to boarding schools at the beginning and end of school terms was a significant traffic flow. Locomotives of the 'V' or "Schools" class, introduced in 1930, were hence named after prominent English public schools. The fifteenth locomotive, no. 914, was named Eastbourne after the college. Built at Eastleigh in October 1932, no. 914 remained in service until withdrawn by British Railways in July 1961.

== Headmasters ==
- 1867: Rev. J. R. Wood
- Rev. Thompson Podmore
- 1887–1888: Rev. G. R. Green
- 1888–1895: Rev. Dr Charles Crowden
- 1895–1900: M. A. Bayfield
- 1900–1906: Harry Thomson
- 1906–1924: Rev. F. F. S. Williams
- 1924–1929: E. C. Arnold
- 1929–1938: Gordon V. Carey
- 1938–1956: F. J. Nugee
- 1956–1970: Michael Birley
- 1970–1973: John Kendall-Carpenter
- 1972–1973: Donald Perrens, acting headmaster
- 1973–1981: Simon Langdale
- 1981–1993: Christopher Saunders
- 1993–2005: Charlie Bush
- 2005–2016: Simon Davies
- 2016–present: Tom Lawson

== Notable alumni ==
=== Former pupils ===
Former pupils are known as Old Eastbournians, and are members of the Eastbournian Society, formerly the Old Eastbournian Association.

- Nick Atkinson, lead singer of the band Rooster
- Harry Bentley, jockey
- Theo Bevacqua, Cardiff rugby player
- Olav Bjortomt, World Quiz Champion 2003, writes quizzes in The Times newspaper
- James Richard Henry Burns, police officer
- Sir Hugh Casson, architect
- Patti Clare, actress
- Stephanie Constant, immunologist
- Nick Estcourt, notable extreme altitude mountaineer
- Michael Fish, weather forecaster
- Richard Fitter, naturalist
- David Lloyd George, 2nd Viscount Tenby
- Gwilym Lloyd George, 1st Viscount Tenby, politician
- William Lloyd George, 3rd Viscount Tenby
- Ed Giddins, cricketer
- Charles Hedley, naturalist
- Bob Holness, presenter
- David Howell, chess Grandmaster
- Eddie Izzard, comedian
- Nasser Judeh, Jordanian former Minister of Foreign Affairs
- Sam Kiley, security editor of Sky News
- Jules Knight, actor and singer
- Timothy Landon, soldier
- Deborah Lawrenson, novelist and journalist
- Oliver W. F. Lodge, poet and author
- Guy McKnight, singer/songwriter
- Ruari McLean, designer
- Johnny Mercer, Minister for Veterans Affairs
- Royce Mills, actor
- Archibald Morres, cricketer
- Ian Mortimer, historian and historical biographer
- Tawanda Muyeye, cricketer
- Adam Mynott, BBC journalist
- Theodore Leighton Pennell, missionary and eccentric
- Michael Praed, actor
- Charles Rivett-Carnac, commissioner of Royal Canadian Mounted Police
- Alex Simcox, cricketer
- Hugh Skinner, actor
- David Smith, historian and fellow of Selwyn College, Cambridge
- Frederick Soddy, chemist and Nobel laureate
- Sirichok Sopha, Thai politician
- Hugo Southwell, rugby player
- Ed Speleers, actor, played Eragon in The Inheritance Cycle and footman Jimmy in the ITV drama Downton Abbey
- Guy Thwaites MBE, physician and microbiologist
- John Wells, satirist, co-author of the Dear Bill column in Private Eye
- W. P. D. Wightman, philosophical author
- Peter Wildy, professor, virologist
- Thomas Wilson, cricketer
- Woodrow Lyle Wyatt, Baron Wyatt of Weeford, politician, journalist and diarist
- John Young, cricketer
- James Yuill, folktronica musician

=== Military ===
- Wing Commander Roland Beamont, British fighter pilot
- Admiral Sir Ian Forbes, former deputy Supreme Allied Commander Atlantic
- Major General Patrick Kay, chief of staff of the Royal Marines; secretary of the Defence, Press and Broadcasting Advisory Committee
- Brigadier Timothy Landon, moderniser of the Sultanate of Oman
- Major General Hugh Prince, chief of the Military Planning Office of the Southeast Asia Treaty Organization
- General Lord Richards, chief of the Defence Staff

==== Victoria Cross holders ====
Two Old Eastbournians have won the Victoria Cross:

- Tirah Campaign, India
  - Captain Henry Singleton Pennell. He was a lieutenant when he performed the act for which he received the VC.
- First World War
  - Group Captain Lionel Wilmot Brabazon Rees. He was a major when he performed the act for which he received the VC.

==== Military Cross holders ====
- Second World War
  - Captain Peter Arthur David Baker

=== Notable staff ===
- Aleister Crowley, occultist and mystic. It was previously believed that Crowley was a pupil at Eastbourne College, but this myth was debunked in 2015 by the college's archivist, Michael Partridge. Crowley did, however, work as an assistant in the chemistry laboratory to the Head of Science, Robert Edward Hughes, at age 18.
- Roger Knight, assistant master in 1970s
- Min Patel, cricket coach
- John Shepherd, cricket coach

== Notes ==
- College Archives - these can be found on the Eastbournian Society website under 'Digital Archives', or visited at the college by appointment.
- Allom, Vincent Mulcaster; Eastbourne College (1967). Ex Oriente Salus - A Centenary History of Eastbourne College. ISBN 978-0950355900.

== Bibliography ==
- "Schools Guide 2012 - Eastbourne College". Tatler.
