= Le Cercle =

Secretive, invitation-only foreign policy forum

- Formation: 1951
- Founder: Antoine Pinay; Jean Violet
- Type: Think tank

Le Cercle is an invitation-only foreign policy forum. Initially its focus was opposing communism and, in the 1970s and 1980s, supporting apartheid when the group had intimate ties with and funding from South Africa. The group was described by British Conservative MP Alan Clark as "an Atlanticist society of right-wing dignitaries".

As an elite conference, it is comparable to the Bilderberg meeting, but it is considered more secret and has no public and little media presence. Only selected and invited members are admitted to the meeting, and they are obliged to maintain secrecy.

Agenda items and lists of participants are not published. Members include diplomats, high-ranking politicians, journalists, businessman, intelligence agents, civil servants, members of the high nobility and other influential personalities.

== History ==
Le Cercle was established in 1952-1953 by then French prime minister Antoine Pinay and French intelligence agent Jean Violet under the name Cercle Pinay. Konrad Adenauer and Franz Josef Strauss were co-founders and reconciliation between France and Germany was an important goal. Historian Adrian Hänni wrote that "The Cercle's founding vision encompassed the integration of a Christian-Catholic Europe, an aspiration reflected in the Cercle's personal membership and the countries represented in its early years." The other members of the original Cercle were from the Governments of Belgium, Italy, Luxembourg and the Netherlands including a number of members of the Catholic Opus Dei and the Knights of Malta.

Political changes in 1969 led to the addition of Portugal, Spain, Switzerland, the United Kingdom and the United States with meetings held twice a year rather than three times a year as before. This led to a shift in objectives, which became an emphasis on forming a strong anti-Communist alliance between the United States and Europe. Hänni stated that "The leaders of the group increasingly considered strategies to target public opinion and, to this end, formed a "Cercle network" of associated organisations, institutes and think tanks, which attacked both the Soviet Union and the perceived "leftist" governments or opposition movements in Europe and the Third World." Its members then and now tended to be strident anti-Communists, including members of the World Anti-Communist League. The Union of South Africa provided the only official delegation and the Cercle supported organisations such as Renamo, whose general secretary attended meetings, and Unita.

Le Cercle was mentioned in the early 1980s by Der Spiegel in Germany as a result of the controversy surrounding Franz Josef Strauss, one of the regular attendants of the Cercle. In the late 1990s, the Cercle received some attention after a scandal had broken out involving Jonathan Aitken, at the time chairman of Le Cercle.

In June 2004, it met in the Royal Palace in Belgrade, hosted by Alexander, Crown Prince of Yugoslavia.

In later years, the British took over the chairmanship of Le Cercle. Leading members included the ex-MI6 officer Anthony Cavendish, the British Conservative MP Julian Amery, and Brian Crozier.

Alan Clark, the British Conservative MP and historian stated in his diaries that Le Cercle was funded by the CIA.

British MPs Rory Stewart and Nadhim Zahawi were chairs of Le Cercle in the 2010s at the same time as they served as members of the UK parliament's Foreign Affairs Select Committee. Neither MP declared their chairmanship of Le Cercle to the UK parliament.

Ecuadorian Foreign Minister, Guillaume Long, wrote in 2022 that the group has "strong links to the intelligence community in Europe and the United States".

== Sample agenda from 1979 ==
An agenda presented by Brian Crozier noted that its goal to change the British Government had been changed by the election of Margaret Thatcher and among others listed the following objectives:

- "Undercover financial transactions for political aims";
- "International campaigns aiming to discredit hostile personalities or events";
- "Creation of a (private) intelligence service specialising in a selective point of view"

== Chairs ==
- 1953–1971: Antoine Pinay
- 1971–1980: Jean Violet
- 1980–1985: Brian Crozier
- 1985–1993: Julian Amery
- 1993–1996: Jonathan Aitken
- 1996–2008: Norman Lamont
- 2008–2013: Michael Ancram
- 2013–2014: Rory Stewart
- 2015–2018: Nadhim Zahawi

== Members ==
The following people, among others, were among the participants at the Cercle's meetings:

- Konrad Adenauer
- Michael Ancram
- Giulio Andreotti
- Jonathan Aitken
- Julian Amery
- Nadhmi Auchi
- Franz Josef Bach
- John R. Bolton
- Zbigniew Brzeziński
- William J. Casey
- William Colby
- Paul Channon, Baron Kelvedon
- Brian Crozier
- Alan Duncan
- Manuel Fraga
- Otto von Habsburg
- Hussein of Jordan
- Henry Kissinger
- Norman Lamont
- Timothy Landon
- Jean Monnet
- John Negroponte
- Richard Nixon
- Carlo Pesenti
- Antoine Pinay
- David Rockefeller
- Donald Rumsfeld
- Qabus bin Said
- Antonin Scalia
- Robert Schuman
- Norman Schwarzkopf Jr.
- Rory Stewart
- Franz Josef Strauß
- Margaret Thatcher
- Paul Vanden Boeynants
- Jean Violet
- Paul Volcker
- John Vorster
- Nadhim Zahawi

== See also ==
- World Anti-Communist League
