= Jean Violet =

Jean Violet (born 1917; died December 2000) was a French lawyer and secret service agent who worked behind the scenes as a discreet networker during the Cold War. As a confidant of French Prime Minister Antoine Pinay, he worked with him to establish Le Cercle, a secret organization with Catholic conservative leanings that played an important role in German-French reconciliation and European unification in the post-war period.

== Biography ==
He came from a conservative Catholic background and began his career as a lawyer in Paris. During his studies in Paris, he came into contact with right-wing and anti-democratic ideas, and in the 1930s Violet is said to have had links to the right-wing secret society La Cagoule. During the occupation of World War II, he is said to have collaborated with the Vichy regime, but after 1945 he sought contact with the victorious Gaullists. In 1948, he became an advisor to the Holy See and was even an unofficial member of the Holy See delegation to the United Nations Legal Committee. At the same time, Violet worked as an international advisor to companies and businesspeople from France and other countries. In the early 1950s, Violet established close ties with France's political leadership. In 1952, Prime Minister Antoine Pinay recruited Violet and appointed him as his confidential advisor. Violet advocated the continuation of the Algerian War and advised Pinay to seek rapprochement with Spain led by Francisco Franco, which was still under fascist rule. He also began to act as a go-between for Pinay and West German conservatives such as Konrad Adenauer and Franz Josef Strauß.

Pinay recommended Violet to the head of the foreign intelligence service, Service de Documentation Extérieure et de Contre-Espionnage (SDECE), Pierre Boursicot. Violet later explained that he realized “that I could be useful to my country thanks to my professional position on the international stage, [and] I chose to fight for France in the ranks of the SDECE.” In 1957, under the new head of the SDECE, General Paul Grossin, Violet was formally recruited as an agent and entrusted with politically sensitive missions. He rose to become one of the service's most important correspondants honorables (trusted contacts) and held the official title of special legal advisor (Avocat-Conseil) to the SDECE. It is striking that during Violet's 15 years with the intelligence service, the SDECE director was always his immediate superior. Violet reported directly to General Grossin and his successor, underscoring his special status within the service.

Between 1957 and 1970, Violet was involved in several covert operations: he acted as a lobbyist for the French government at the United Nations (including around 1956 to avert the severance of diplomatic relations with Lebanon after the Suez Crisis and in 1959 to bring Latin American states into line against a UN resolution on the Algerian question). As part of intelligence cooperation, he supported collaboration with intelligence agencies in Latin America and Europe to assist anti-communist operations. He also secretly coordinated Catholic networks behind the Iron Curtain – the so-called “Church of Silence” – in Poland, Hungary, Czechoslovakia, and Romania, financed with the support of the SDECE. Violet's activities also contributed to the rapprochement between France and West Germany: as Pinay's trusted emissary, he was involved in the preparation of the Paris Agreements and the Bonn Convention (1952/55) and is said to have played a key role in the secret preliminary negotiations for the Élysée Treaty of 1963. In the 1970s, Violet was involved in the Great Oil Sniffer Hoax, in which the company Elf Aquitaine lost a billion francs. The stolen money was used to finance anticommunist networks.

=== Le Cercle ===
Parallel to these official duties, Violet built up his own internationally networked system of contacts. He was regarded as a “man in the shadows” who, from the 1950s onwards, informally brought together influential figures from across Europe. In 1952/53, Violet was one of the founders of the private transatlantic discussion group Le Cercle (also known as Cercle Pinay). This secret right-wing conservative network was created at Pinay's instigation to improve coordination between Western European Christian Democrats during the Cold War. Prominent co-founders included German Chancellor Adenauer and CSU politician Franz Josef Strauß. Pinay and Adenauer initially took over the chairmanship, but entrusted Jean Violet with the operational management of Le Cercle as secretary general. In this capacity, Violet established links with political, economic, and intelligence circles throughout Western Europe and the US. He not only worked for the French service, but from the 1960s onwards he was also active as a paid contact for the West German Federal Intelligence Service (BND). He maintained contacts with the Vatican and conservative networks throughout Europe, including the irregular Masonic lodge Propaganda Due, which succeeded in infiltrating the Italian state to a large extent.

Although a staunch anti-communist, from the end of the 1960s, after leaving the SDECE, he was involved in the policy of détente towards the Eastern Bloc, which culminated in the Helsinki Accords of 1975. From 1971 to 1980, Violet himself took over as chairman of Le Cercle, succeeding Pinay. Looking back, British and French intelligence veterans described Violet as the inspiration and long-time organizer of Le Cercle, who spun a dense network of right-wing influence behind the scenes. Jean Violet remained active in the organization until his death in December 2000.
