= Archibald Morres =

English cricketer

Personal information
- Full name: Archibald Redmond Morres
- Born: 7 March 1902; Castel, Guernsey
- Died: 16 January 1970 (aged 67); New Forest, Hampshire, England
- Batting: Unknown
- Bowling: Unknown
- Relatives: Hugh Morres (father); Thomas Morres (great-uncle); Elliot Morres (great-uncle)

Domestic team information
- Years: Team
- 1925/26: Europeans

Career statistics
Competition	First-class
Matches	1
Runs scored	72
Batting average	72.00
100s/50s	–/–
Top score	47
Balls bowled	42
Wickets	1
Bowling average	20.00
5 wickets in innings	–
10 wickets in match	–
Best bowling	1/20
Catches/stumpings	–/–
- Source: ESPNcricinfo, 26 November 2022

Archibald Redmond Morres (7 March 1902 — 16 January 1970) was an English first-class cricketer and British Army officer.

The son of the cricketer Hugh Morres, he was born in Guernsey at Castel in March 1902, where he father was a schoolmaster. Morres was educated at Eastbourne College, before proceeding to the Royal Military Academy, Woolwich. He graduated as a second lieutenant into the Royal Artillery (RA) in September 1920, with promotion to lieutenant in August 1924. He went with the RA to British India, where he made a single appearance in first-class cricket for the Europeans cricket team against the Muslims at Lahore in the 1925/26 Lahore Tournament. Batting twice in the match, he was dismissed in the Europeans first innings for 47 runs by Abdus Salaam, while in their second innings of 83 for 6, he remained unbeaten on 25. With the ball, he took the wicket of Khadim Hussain in the Muslims only innings. He was later made a temporary captain in January 1934, when he was appointed an adjutant in the Territorial Army. The following year he gained the full rank of captain, and later vacated his adjutant position in the TA in January 1938 and was subsequently restored to the RA, before being placed on the half-pay list on account of ill health in July 1939.

Morres returned to the RA in the Second World War, but retired from active service three months later in March 1940 on account of ill-health. His health had improved enough for him to return to active service by 1943, with promotion to major coming in November of that year. He retired for a final time on account of disability following the war in September 1947. Morres died at Hampshire in the New Forest in January 1970. His great-uncle's, Thomas and Elliot Morres, were also first-class cricketers.
