= Stephanie Constant =

American science administrator

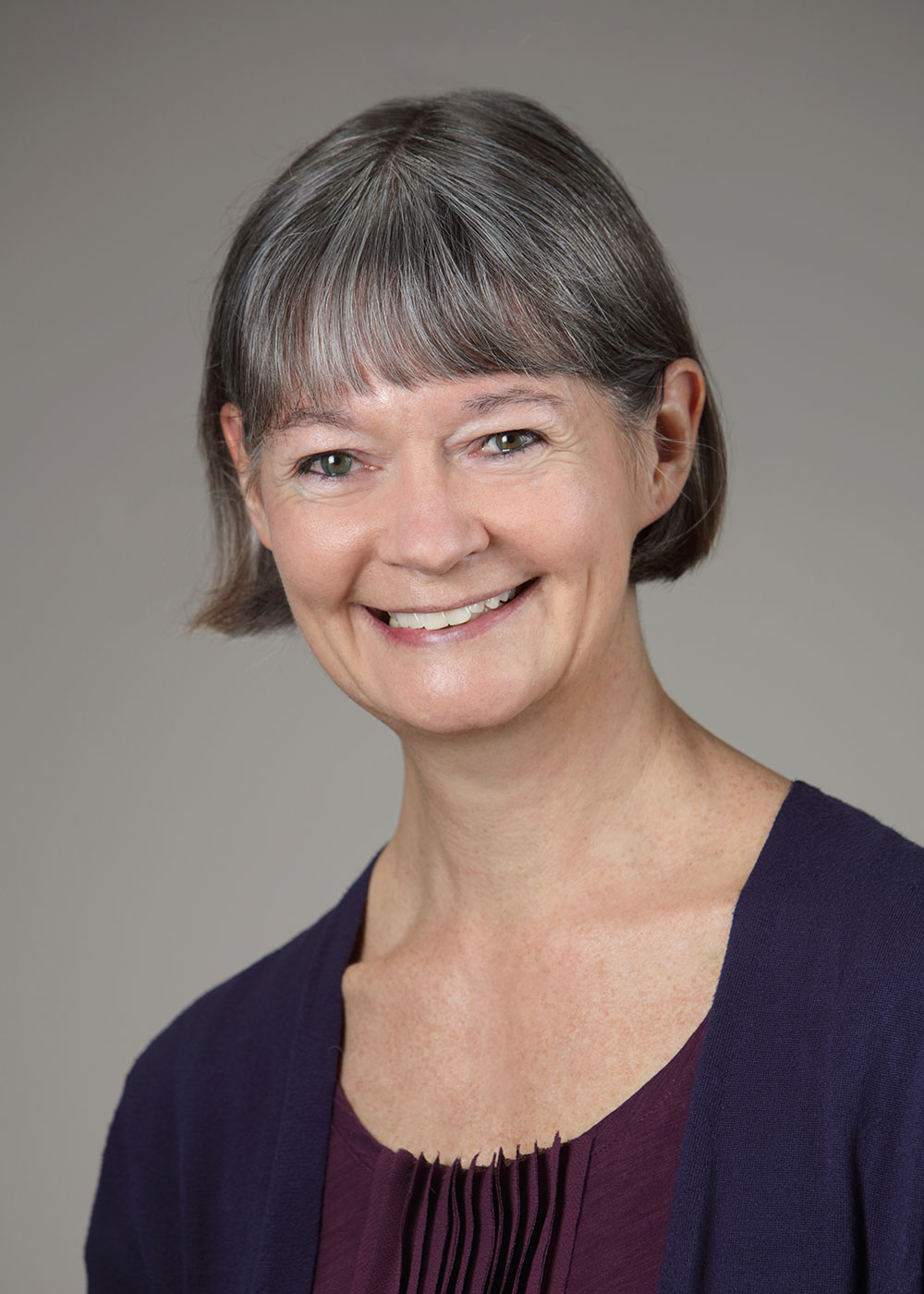
- Education: University of York (B.S., Ph.D)
- Scientific career
- Fields: Immunology
- Workplaces: George Washington University; National Heart, Lung, and Blood Institute; National Institute of General Medical Sciences

Stephanie L. Constant is an American immunologist and science administrator. She was an associate professor at George Washington University and a scientific review officer at National Heart, Lung, and Blood Institute before becoming chief of the National Institute of General Medical Sciences Office of Scientific Review in 2017.

== Education ==
Constant earned a B.S. in biology and a Ph.D. in immunology and parasitology, both from the University of York. She conducted postdoctoral research in the field of CD4 T cell differentiation at Yale School of Medicine, in the laboratory of H. Kim Bottomly.

== Career ==
Constant was a tenured associate professor in the department of microbiology, immunology and tropical medicine at George Washington University where her laboratory studied the regulation of immune responses in chronic inflammatory diseases. Her research included studies on the regulation of leukocyte migration in acute and chronic inflammation and on the mechanisms of immunomodulation by parasite products. The National Institutes of Health (NIH) supported her research from 1996 to 2011.

Constant also joined NIH in 2011 as a scientific review officer in the National Heart, Lung, and Blood Institute (NHLBI). At NHLBI, Constant's review portfolio was primarily focused on training and career development programs to promote diversity in the biomedical workforce. She worked on detail in NIH's Office of Extramural Research, where she contributed to developing and updating policy guidelines to enhance the NIH peer review process. Constant chaired or co-chaired a number of NHLBI working groups, including its Diversity Training Programs subcommittee, and served on several NIH-wide training and peer review committees. She participated in outreach programs to promote diversity in the biomedical workforce.

In 2017, Constant joined the National Institute of General Medical Sciences (NIGMS) as chief of the Office of Scientific Review (OSR). Her duties include overseeing the review of a broad range of research, research training, research education, and center grant applications assigned to NIGMS. She directs OSR as it plans, conducts and coordinates the scientific and technical merit review of research grants, cooperative agreements and training grant applications, including those designed to increase diversity in the research workforce, and assures that these reviews are of a uniformly high quality.
