= Adam Mynott =

English journalist

Adam Mynott (born October 1957 in Eastbourne) is a journalist.

== Education ==
Mynott was educated at the independent schools Ascham and Eastbourne College followed by Exeter University in 1980 with a degree in Philosophy.

== Career ==
Mynott first joined the BBC as a trainee radio reporter in 1981 and then worked for BBC Radio Leeds in the mid-1980s. Since then he has worked on The Today programme covering amongst other issues The First Gulf War (1991). He then had a spell in New York City but returned in 1992 to work as a BBC News reporter. Since then he has worked as a sports correspondent and as a South Asia correspondent from 2001. He became BBC Nairobi correspondent in August 2004.

Mynott was embedded with US Marines during the second (2003) Gulf War. His experiences were published in a book written by BBC correspondents.

In 2009, Mynott returned to the UK and became a BBC World Affairs Correspondent. After 3 years at G4S plc as Director of Media Relations, he joined the Chinese telecommunications company, Huawei in September 2014.
