= Michael Braddick =

British historian and academic

Michael Jonathan Braddick, FBA, FRHistS (born 29 August 1962) is a British historian and academic specialising in early modern Britain. Educated at the University of Cambridge (BA, PhD), until 2024 he was Professor of History at the University of Sheffield. He was Pro-Vice-Chancellor and Head of the Faculty of Arts and Humanities from 2009 to 2013. Since 2024 he has been Senior Research Fellow of All Souls College, Oxford, and a professor in the Oxford University History Faculty.

He is a member of the Editorial Board for Past & Present and series editor of Cambridge Studies in Early Modern British History.
