= Timothy Landon =

British-Omani military officer, political advisor and businessman (1942-2007)

Brigadier Sir Timothy Whittington Landon
- Born: 20 August 1942; Vancouver Island, British Columbia, Canada
- Died: 6 July 2007; Winchester, Hampshire, England
- Military career
- Service years: 1960–1979
- Rank: Brigadier
- Unit: 10th Hussars
- Conflicts: Dhofar Rebellion
- Awards: Knight Commander of the Royal Victorian Order

Brigadier James Timothy Whittington Landon, KCVO, (born 20 August 1942, Vancouver Island, British Columbia, Canada; died 6 July 2007, Winchester, Hampshire, England) served in the British and Omani armies and was instrumental in the development of the present Sultanate of Oman. He was one of Britain's wealthiest people. He was widely suspected to have been involved in a significant affair with Qaboos bin Said, whom he helped install as his father's successor to the Sultanate.

== Early life ==
Landon was born 20 August 1942 on Vancouver Island, British Columbia, Canada to a British Brigadier General and a Canadian mother. Tim Landon attended Eastbourne College in Sussex. As a graduate of the Royal Military Academy, Sandhurst, Landon was posted to the 10th Hussars.

== Time in Oman ==
With his regiment, he travelled overland from Europe to Arabia and arrived in Oman in the mid-1960s. He was sent there as part of a British military operation to help Sultan Said bin Taimur defeat the Soviet-backed Dhofar Rebellion. He was stationed in the south as an intelligence officer, but was transferred to Muscat. There he became an part of the British push to remove the Sultan.

Landon, who was close to the Sultan's son Qaboos from his Sandhurst days, whom the Sultan had placed under house arrest. The coup occurred on 23 July 1970. Said bin Taimur was told to sign over power to his son and flown to London on an RAF transport aircraft, where he lived a suite at the Dorchester Hotel until his death. The deposed sultan blamed Landon whom he had allowed to visit his son.

Over the next fifteen years, the young officer helped his friends develop the Sultanate from a non-industrial, agrarian economy into a modern 20th-century state. Omani oil revenues enabled much of the country's advances and Landon became a leading advocate of "Omanisation" of the economy and government.

Landon gained Omani citizenship. In 1982, he was made a honorary knight of the Royal Victorian Order.

== Later projects ==
By 1979, Landon's position as an adviser had become a figurehead role. He returned to England, taking up a diplomatic post at the Omani embassy in London and establishing a home at Faccombe, a village near Andover in Hampshire. The title the "White Sultan" was regarded with bemusement by Landon, who maintained that Sultan Qaboos was very much in charge of Oman's destiny, and he was simply a servant and friend there to give advice. He continued to shuttle between London and Muscat until he died, his Boeing often seen arriving at or leaving Farnborough, the nearest airport to his home.

== Financial interests, philanthropy, and controversy ==
Landon invested the money he had made during his time in Oman, diversifying his wealth into mineral exploration and farming in Africa, property and real estate investments in Europe and America, and a wide range of financial portfolios in global markets. His fortune was estimated at US$750 million or higher. Landon was known to be a patron of the arts and society as well as an avid conservationist, generously assisting with fundraising for foundations and charities.

Landon also played an important role as intermediary in several questionable deals like when giant telecom company Ericsson sold telecommunications equipment to Oman in the late 1990s. The connection was revealed by a joint investigation into Landon's business by the Swedish Public Television "Uppdrag granskning" and Swedish Public Radio's "Dagens Eko" in January 2007.

Landon was also behind another questionable deal when in 1999 Swedish jetfighter Saab and UK defence giant BAE Systems offered millions of dollars in bribes to Czech politicians to buy the Gripen jet-fighter. The real beneficiary of the money paid out was the Austrian Count Alfons von Mensdorff-Pouilly, a longtime agent for BAE and a first cousin of Landon's wife Princess Katalina Esterházy de Galántha. Mensdorff-Pouilly received secret commission contract of at least 81 million Swedish crowns for the final deal in 2003 when the Czech Republic leased Gripen jetfighter.

Both the Ericsson Oman deal and the SAAB/BAE deal has been the focus of several police and parliamentary investigations. By 2008, investigations had opened in the Czech Republic, Hungary, Sweden, United Kingdom, United States, Switzerland, and Austria.

Tim Landon was also involved in the smuggling of a Bofors cannon to the sultanate of Oman in the 1980s. "Sultan Quaboos of Oman got it into his head that his security would be enhanced if his yacht was kitted out with the Bofors guns. He wanted the Bofors guns and the government in Sweden objected to this deal, and this is where Landon and his associates always came into play. If something was denied them by diplomatic channels they would take the scenic route."

== Family and legacy ==
In 1977, Tim Landon married Princess Katalina Marie Therese Antoinette Esterhazy de Galantha, a member of the Hungarian aristocracy, noted for its felicitous marriages, great wealth, and large land-holdings, and historically loyal to the Habsburg Dynasty. The marriage produced a son, Arthur Landon, who studied film production at Bristol University. Arthur is, according to the Sunday Times Rich List, the wealthiest young person in Britain, with an inherited fortune of £200 million, and is "a close friend of the royal princes, William and Harry".

== See also ==
- White Rajahs
