= Carlo Pesenti =

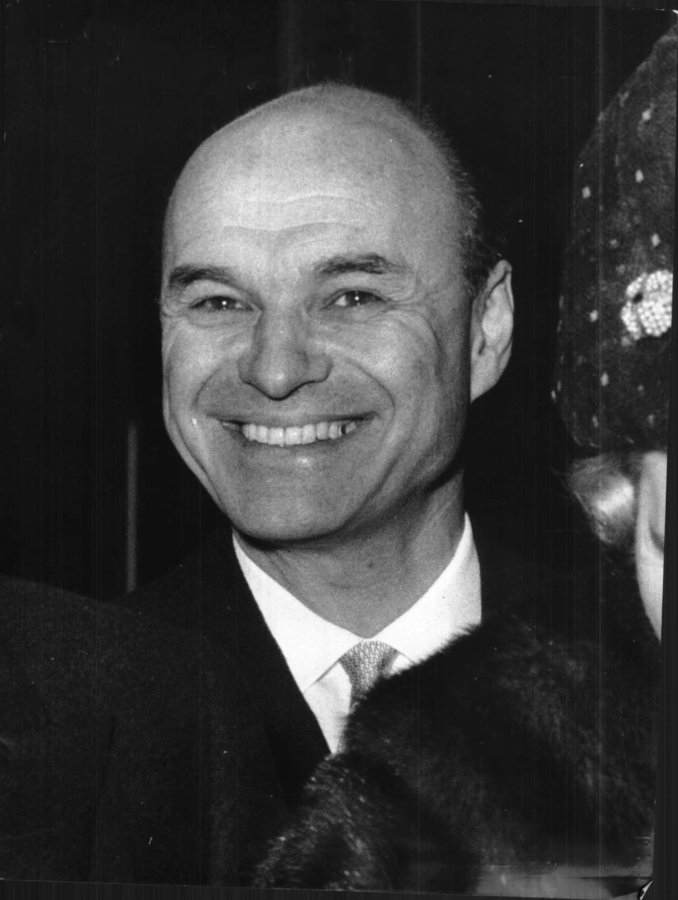
- Carlo Pesenti (1964)
- Born: 1907; Alzano Lombardo, Lombardy, Kingdom of Italy
- Died: September 20, 1984; Montreal, Canada
- Education: Polytechnic University of Milan
- Occupations: Businessman and banker

Carlo Pesenti (born 1907 in Alzano Lombardo; died September 20, 1984, in Montreal, Canada) was an Italian entrepreneur. From 1946 until his death, he was director of the Italcementi Group and its affiliated companies and banks. He was also the main shareholder of the newspapers La Notte and Il Giornale di Bergamo and, until the end of the 1960s, owner of the car manufacturer Lancia. At one point, he sat on the supervisory boards of over 20 companies and also had excellent political contacts. Following a fraud scandal in the late 1970s, Pesenti lost control of most of his companies.

== Biography ==
Carlo Pesenti was born into the influential Pesenti family, who originated from Bergamo in Lombardy and were considered staunch Catholics. Italcementi, which Carlo inherited in 1946, was founded in the early 19th century as a sawmill and paper mill and entered the cement production business in the late 20th century under the leadership of his uncle Antonio Pesenti. Carlo Pesenti, son of Augusto Pesenti and cousin of Antonio Pesenti, attended the Collegio dei Padri Barnabiti in Moncalieri and then enrolled in mechanical engineering at the Polytechnic University of Milan, graduating in 1933. He then worked for the family business, becoming its managing director and general manager in 1942. Because he was considered politically unreliable, he was expelled from the company during the Second World War and is even said to have spent several days in prison. In 1946, he took full control of the company, as he was considered untainted, whereas his uncle Antonio had close ties to the old fascist regime and was forced to leave the company.

Under the leadership of the shrewd businessman Pesenti, Italcementi benefited from the post-war economic upturn and construction boom in Europe, enabling it to become one of the world's largest cement manufacturers. However, the business was not limited to cement, as the ambitious Pesenti built up a conglomerate. In 1946, Italmobiliare was founded as a subsidiary to serve as a holding company for Pesenti's financial and banking activities. In search of financing, his connections to the Curia of Bergamo enabled him to acquire the Banca Provinciale Lombarda, an institution closely linked to the Catholic Church. In the 1950s, his company controlled half of the Italian cement market and expanded into the insurance business with the acquisition of Riunione Adriatica di Sicurtà. Other important acquisitions during this period included Franco Tosi Meccanica, a large stake in the Falck steelworks, and the newspaper Giornale di Bergamo. In 1952, he also founded the Milan-based La Notte, a daily newspaper with an anti-communist orientation, which he financed.

Pesenti was known for leading a secluded life and not flaunting his wealth. He was known to have only two great passions: banking (primarily linked to his desire to always have access to sources of liquidity) and luxury cars. In keeping with this, he acquired the car manufacturer Lancia in 1955 for 10 billion lira, but it was not integrated into Italcementi and remained legally independent. In 1958, he also took on the role of vice president of the company. However, his involvement in the car business was not very successful, and in the mid-1960s, the company fell into a serious crisis, leading Pesenti to sell it to Fiat in 1969 after BMW decided against a takeover. Business was more successful in the financial sector, where, under Pesenti's leadership, eight financial institutions previously controlled by Christian Democrat politician Teresio Guglielmone were merged to form the Istituto Bancario Italiano, the second-largest private bank in the country, which was controlled by his family holding company Italmobiliare. The deal also had a political component, as the eight merged financial institutions had previously served primarily as a slush fund for the Democrazia Cristiana, which feared a major scandal.

In 1969, however, Pesenti was confronted with a takeover attempt by Michele Sindona, then a fifty-year-old lawyer who wanted to enter the big world of finance. With funds from the British bank Hambros (now a subsidiary of the French Société Générale), he bought shares in Italmobiliare with the aim of taking control of Pesenti's financial empire. Pesenti then went to Rome to ask politicians for help. He demanded something in return for the favor he had done them by saving Guglielmone's banks. Finance Minister Emilio Colombo and Guido Carli, governor of the Banca d'Italia, demanded that Sindona should sell back his shares in Italmobiliare to Pesenti. Pesenti finally paid 50 billion lira (Sindona had paid 35 billion for the shares), which was necessary to regain control of Italcementi. Almost ten years later, it was revealed how this money had come into Pesenti's possession: it had been transferred to him via two offshore financial companies in Panama and Liechtenstein by Banca Provinciale Lombarda (which, as mentioned, was controlled by Italmobiliare, which in turn was controlled by Italcementi), who in turn passed it on to Sindona and Hambros in exchange for the shares.

The affair came to light in the late 1970s when two managers of Banca Provinciale Lombarda, Emilio Duchi, head of the bank's securities department, and Gaetano Bianco, his colleague, were dismissed for a series of incidents that were never fully clarified involving allegedly risky investments that had caused the bank losses amounting to billions. In early 1979, the two former managers filed a complaint with the Milan public prosecutor's office, revealing that Banca Lombarda had concealed the hidden loan of 50 billion lira for the repurchase of Italmobiliare (which was never repaid) through fraudulent accounting. The 50 billion lira had now become 180 billion lira of debt, putting Pesenti in serious financial difficulty. As a result of the affair, Pesenti lost most of his business empire, retaining only control of the industrial activities. In July 1984, Banca Lombarda was sold as the last of the three family banks for an amount never officially confirmed, estimated at around 480 billion lira. At that time, Pesenti was also being investigated by the Milan public prosecutor's office in connection with the collapse of Roberto Calvi's Banco Ambrosiano, who was a close business associate of Pesenti. Pesenti had become the second largest shareholder in Banco Ambrosiano in 1982, three months before Calvi died mysteriously in London.

In September 1984, Pesenti traveled to Canada to undergo medical tests at the Montreal General Hospital, having previously undergone heart surgery in Houston in the United States. During his hospital stay, his condition suddenly deteriorated and Pesenti died on September 20, 1984. Pesenti left behind his wife Rosalie and four children. At the time of his death, he was still under investigation for irregular transactions involving Banco Ambrosiano shares and dubious financial dealings with the Vatican Bank.

== Political connections ==
Pesenti belonged to Italy's conservative Catholic establishment and had close ties to the financial and industrial elite. He was anti-communist and a supporter of the Democrazia Cristiana, with whom he entered into a close client relationship that pushed the boundaries of legality. Pesenti is also said to have financed the right-wing extremist and terrorist Avanguardia Nazionale. As an important European industrialist, he was well connected throughout Europe and participated in the meetings of the Trilateral Commission. He also attended meetings of Le Cercle, a conspiratorial forum for cooperation between conservatives on both sides of the Atlantic. In his autobiography, David Rockefeller refers to Le Cercle as the "Pesenti group" and states that he first learned of its existence in October 1967, when he was invited by Carlo Pesenti to join it.
