= Jules Horowitz Reactor =

Research reactor planned for operation by 2028 in France

Coordinates: 43.6778°N 5.7685°E

The Jules Horowitz Reactor (Réacteur Jules Horowitz, RJH) is a materials testing reactor (MTR) cooled and moderated with water. It is under construction at Cadarache in southern France, based on the recommendations of the European Roadmap for Research Infrastructures Report, which was published by the European Strategy Forum on Research Infrastructures (ESFRI) in 2006. The reactor, which is named for the 20th-century French nuclear scientist Jules Horowitz.

The reactor is designed to have a good neutron economy that results in large numbers of thermal neutrons being available around the outside of the reactor core. The neutrons from this source can be used in many materials testing and other experimental roles. The system also allows samples to be inserted directly into the core, where they are exposed to high-energy neutrons, which is useful for isotope preparation. Similar reactors were common in the 1950s and 60s, but most have reached the end of their practical lifespans, and few new ones have been commissioned. This has led to a crisis in the worldwide supply of medical isotopes, one of the major roles of the JHR.

Site preparation began in 2007, followed by the first concrete in the summer of 2009. The central containment structure was completed with the addition of a 105-tonne (103-long-ton; 116-short-ton) dome in December 2013. At the time it was predicted the system would be operational in 2014. Since then the site has suffered from significant delays, leading to a complete re-organization of the management. Current estimates suggest first criticality sometime after 2030.

== Design ==
The Jules Horowitz Reactor is a materials testing reactor, with a power output of approximately 100 megawatts. It has roughly twice the neutron flux of the OSIRIS design. It has a planned service lifespan of around 50 years, and is designed to be adaptable for a variety of research uses by nuclear utilities, nuclear steam system suppliers, nuclear fuel manufacturers, research organisations and safety authorities. The reactor's versatile modular design allows it to accommodate up to 20 simultaneous experiments. Its instrumentation allows previously unavailable real-time analysis to be performed.

Its primary uses will be research into the performance of nuclear fuel at existing reactors, testing of materials used in reactors, testing designs for fuel for future reactors and the production of radioisotopes for use in medicine. The reactor is intended to produce radioisotopes in coordination with existing production facilities at Petten in the Netherlands. The reactor's coolant flow is ascending, in the order of nearly 2.36 m^{3}/s (83 cu ft/s), with maximum pressure in the order of 1.0–1.5 megapascals (150–220 psi), depending on the required flow and the core head loss.

== History ==
=== Project background and funding ===
During the early exploration of atomic energy, a number of reactors were designed for the materials testing role. These were generally small designs with limited energy output that incorporated several design features to provide a good neutron economy so that excess neutrons from the core could be used to irradiate materials samples. These designs generally used enriched uranium to allow them to reach criticality while deliberately leaking neutrons or having them absorbed within the core. To meet all of these conditions, these were small and had limited neutron flux. A second generation of similar reactors emerged in the 1960s. These were optimized for neutron production and the number of sample insertion areas. These designs were larger and operated at higher energy, often in the megawatt region, which required additional cooling.

As the nuclear field changed during the 1970s and 80s, there was less interest in materials research and more emphasis on roles like medical isotope production and other commercial uses. This led to the reactors of the 1960s continuing to be used decades later than originally planned. While newer designs emerged with better performance, the cost of building the reactor could not be justified on the commercial uses alone. Projects like MAPLE in Canada were delayed and then cancelled. By the 2000s, this left the majority of these roles being filled by machines that were now many decades old, and the International agreements on the production of enriched uranium meant they were often operating below their design goals. Among the newest was the European example, France's 70 MW OSIRIS, completed in 1968. The entire fleet was expected to leave service by 2020.

The reactor is being built under the framework of an international consortium of research institutes, including France's CEA, the Czech Republic's NRI, Spain's CIEMAT, Finland's VTT, Belgium's SCK•CEN, the United Kingdom's NNL and the European Commission, along with private companies such as Electricité de France (EDF), Vattenfall and Areva. There are two non-European associate partners to the consortium; India's DAE and Japan's JAEA. The construction of the reactor was funded by CEA (which provided 50% of the project's funding), EDF (20%), various EU research institutes (20%) and Areva (10%). In the framework of the IAEA ICERR label (International Centre based on Research Reactors), the JHR will be also available to institutions from IAEA Member States for education, and joint research and development (R&D) projects.

=== Design and construction ===
The design of the reactor was carried out between 2002 and 2005. At the time it called for the reactor to complete construction in mid-2013 and reach initial criticality in early 2014. The total cost of construction was estimated to be around €500 million.

Site preparation began in March 2007. The first concrete for the reactor's foundations was poured in August 2009, and the central containment structure was completed with the addition of a 105-tonne (103-long-ton; 116-short-ton) dome in December 2013. (Note: The JHR timeline shows the confinement building dome being completed in 2017, not 2013. The WNA images show only the metal portions of the dome, their date may refer to when the dome arrived and was installed, while JHR's is when it was completed with concrete.)

JHR ran into significant difficulty from that point and the operational date was pushed back. In 2013, it was expected to be operational in 2018. Based on that estimate, on 9 December 2013 the decision was made to shut down OSIRIS on 31 December 2015. The next year, in 2016, the delays and escalating costs led French naval manufacturer and reactor production company DCNS to pull out of the project after losing €100 million the year before due to work at JHR. At that time it was estimated the reactor would cost approximately €1.5 billion to complete.

By 2019, the cost estimate had escalated even more and was now placed at €2.5 billion, but the estimate also included language that they expected the total would surpass that even if it was completed on its new schedule of 2022. By this time, cost overruns on JHR also helped lead to the cancellation of the ASTRID design, a fast reactor design, as there was not enough money to complete both.

These problems led to the French Government ordering a formal audit in 2019. The resulting Action Plan called for the existing development organization to be disbanded. A new organization took control in March 2020. At that time, the final design of the reactor was still not expected until 2023. In November 2022, a new report suggested the changes put in place due to the Action Plan were working and placed the initial operational date sometime after 2030. The current date, on the CEA web page, puts it between 2032 and 2034.
