= Results of the 2024 French legislative election in Maine-et-Loire =

Following the first round of the 2024 French legislative election on 30 June 2024, runoff elections in each constituency where no candidate received a vote share greater than 50 percent were scheduled for 7 July. Candidates permitted to stand in the runoff elections needed to either come in first or second place in the first round or achieve more than 12.5 percent of the votes of the entire electorate (as opposed to 12.5 percent of the vote share due to low turnout).

== Maine-et-Loire ==
=== 1st constituency ===
Candidate	Party or alliance		First round		Second round	
Candidate	Party or alliance		Votes	%	Votes	%
François Gernigon	Ensemble	Horizons	21,087	34.83	24,719	40.54
Elsa Richard	New Popular Front	The Ecologists	20,475	33.82	21,621	35.46
Hugo Louvigné	National Rally		13,995	23.12	14,629	23.99
Séverine Lécuyer	The Republicans		3,736	6.17		
Marie-Louise Dupas	Far-left	Lutte Ouvrière	642	1.06		
Roselyne Prunière	Reconquête		432	0.71		
Anthony Gouas	Far-left	New Anticapitalist Party (Note: Dissident who ran without the backing of the New Popular Front)	173	0.29		
Total			60,540	100.00	60,969	100.00
Valid votes			60,540	97.53	60,969	97.90
Invalid votes			518	0.83	330	0.53
Blank votes			1,016	1.64	976	1.57
Total votes			62,074	100.00	62,275	100.00
Registered voters/turnout			88,675	70.00	88,699	70.21

=== 2nd constituency ===
Candidate	Party or alliance		First round		Second round	
Candidate	Party or alliance		Votes	%	Votes	%
Stella Dupont	Ensemble	En Commun	21,671	33.01	30,214	45.89
Léo Métayer	New Popular Front	La France Insoumise	18,621	28.36	18,315	27.81
Thomas Brisseau	National Rally		15,945	24.29	17,317	26.30
Benoît Triot	The Republicans		5,864	8.93		
Bertrand Salquain	Miscellaneous centre	Independent	2,719	4.14		
Philippe Lebrun	Far-left	Lutte Ouvrière	834	1.27		
Total			65,654	100.00	65,846	100.00
Valid votes			65,654	97.23	65,846	97.01
Invalid votes			544	0.81	490	0.72
Blank votes			1,325	1.96	1,540	2.27
Total votes			67,523	100.00	67,876	100.00
Registered voters/turnout			95,583	70.64	95,603	71.00

=== 3rd constituency ===
Candidate	Party or alliance		First round		Second round	
Candidate	Party or alliance		Votes	%	Votes	%
Edouard Bourgeault	National Rally		18,344	37.84	20,052	42.83
Anne-Laure Blin	The Republicans		11,572	23.87	26,768	57.17
Patrick Alexandre	New Popular Front	La France Insoumise	9,656	19.92		
Simon Holley	Ensemble	Renaissance	8,168	16.85		
Patricia Peillon	Far-left	Lutte Ouvrière	741	1.53		
Total			48,481	100.00	46,820	100.00
Valid votes			48,481	97.22	46,820	94.28
Invalid votes			470	0.94	702	1.41
Blank votes			918	1.84	2,139	4.31
Total votes			49,869	100.00	49,661	100.00
Registered voters/turnout			72,748	68.55	72,772	68.24

=== 4th constituency ===
Candidate	Party or alliance		First round		Second round	
Candidate	Party or alliance		Votes	%	Votes	%
Aurore Lahondès	National Rally		18,014	34.90	20,289	39.97
Laetitia Saint-Paul	Ensemble	Renaissance	18,001	34.87	30,476	60.03
Charlyne Bouvet	New Popular Front	Communist Party	10,629	20.59		
Frédéric Mortier	The Republicans		3,455	6.69		
Delphine Hamon	Sovereigntist right	Debout la France	769	1.49		
Sylvie Geret	Far-left	Lutte Ouvrière	750	1.45		
Nicolas Vitasse	Far-left	Independent	3	0.01		
Total			51,621	100.00	50,765	100.00
Valid votes			51,621	96.86	50,765	95.15
Invalid votes			586	1.10	637	1.19
Blank votes			1,085	2.04	1,949	3.65
Total votes			53,292	100.00	53,351	100.00
Registered voters/turnout			76,126	70.00	76,142	70.07

=== 5th constituency ===
Candidate	Party or alliance		First round		Second round	
Candidate	Party or alliance		Votes	%	Votes	%
Denis Masséglia	Ensemble	Renaissance	17,730	33.70	33,204	65.63
Gilles Bourdouleix	Union of the far right	The Republicans	16,066	30.54	17,310	34.21
France Moreau	New Popular Front	La France Insoumise	11,220	21.33	82	0.16
Jacquelin Ligot	The Republicans		5,362	10.19		
Frédéric Guyard	Sovereigntist right	Debout la France	822	1.56		
Didier Testu	Far-left	Lutte Ouvrière	821	1.56		
Véronique Estang	Reconquête		583	1.11		
Total			52,604	100.00	50,596	100.00
Valid votes			52,604	96.81	50,596	94.24
Invalid votes			529	0.97	795	1.48
Blank votes			1,207	2.22	2,298	4.28
Total votes			54,340	100.00	53,689	100.00
Registered voters/turnout			80,097	67.84	80,125	67.01

=== 6th constituency ===
Candidate	Party or alliance		First round		Second round	
Candidate	Party or alliance		Votes	%	Votes	%
Nicole Dubré-Chirat	Ensemble	Renaissance	23,776	35.28	43,226	66.32
Tim Pavageau	National Rally		19,422	28.82	21,954	33.68
Sylvie Gabin	New Popular Front	La France Insoumise	16,707	24.79		
Anaëlle Chaussivert	The Republicans		5,142	7.63		
Eric Mercier	Sovereigntist right	Debout la France	1,243	1.84		
Yann Le Diagon	Far-left	Lutte Ouvrière	1,099	1.63		
Total			67,389	100.00	65,180	100.00
Valid votes			67,389	96.58	65,180	93.76
Invalid votes			766	1.10	1,164	1.67
Blank votes			1,618	2.32	3,175	4.57
Total votes			69,773	100.00	69,519	100.00
Registered voters/turnout			99,656	70.01	99,679	69.74

=== 7th constituency ===
Candidate	Party or alliance		First round		Second round	
Candidate	Party or alliance		Votes	%	Votes	%
Philippe Bolo	Ensemble	Democratic Movement	19,541	33.86	24,319	41.73
Guillaume Jouanneau	New Popular Front	Socialist Party	16,778	29.07	16,576	28.44
Clémence Lascaud	National Rally		15,802	27.38	17,389	29.83
Sandrine Boullais-Challier	The Republicans		3,320	5.75		
Céline L'Huillier	Far-left	Lutte Ouvrière	810	1.40		
Régis Crespin	Sovereigntist right	Debout la France	750	1.30		
Valérie Gorioux	Reconquête		715	1.24		
Raphaël de la Salmonière	Miscellaneous right	Independent	0	0.00		
Total			57,716	100.00	58,284	100.00
Valid votes			57,716	96.90	58,284	97.38
Invalid votes			544	0.91	411	0.69
Blank votes			1,305	2.19	1,158	1.93
Total votes			59,565	100.00	59,853	100.00
Registered voters/turnout			84,491	70.50	84,497	70.83
