= La Furia =

French far right satirical magazine

- Editor: Laura Magné
- Categories: Satirical magazine
- Frequency: Quarterly
- Founder: Laurent Obertone; Papacito; Marsault; Laura Magné
- First issue: January 2022
- Country: France
- Language: French

La Furia is a quarterly French satire magazine published since 2022. It was created by Laurent Obertone, Papacito, Marsault and Laura Magné. Magné is the editor-in-chief. The stated goal is to challenge the norms of the political left and the establishment, without supporting any political party or candidate.

Obertone, Papacito and Marsault had significant followings on the Internet prior to the launch of La Furia. Magné was previously an editor at the far-right publishing house Éditions Ring. The first issue of La Furia, published in January 2022, sold 60,000 copies.

The founders have described La Furia as a right-wing equivalent of the left-wing magazine Hara-Kiri, which has been repeated by media such as Le Monde, calling it "the Hara-Kiri of the radical right". The left-wing newspaper Libération has called it a far-right magazine. Le Monde calls it "nationalist" and "reactionary".

In July 2025, the magazine lost its press accreditation following three complaints filed by SOS Racisme and SOS Homophobie over incitement to racial hatred, sexist remarks and LGBT-phobic remarks.
