= National Centre of Independents and Peasants =

National Centre of Independents and Peasants Centre national des indépendants et paysans
- President: Bruno North
- Founder: René Coty
- Founded: 6 January 1949; 77 years ago (as CNI)
- Merger of: Republican Party of Liberty; Farmers' Party for Social Union; Democratic Alliance (1954)
- Headquarters: 6, Rue Quentin Bauchart 75008 Paris
- Youth wing: Youngs Independents and Peasants
- Ideology: French nationalism Conservatism; Agrarianism; Euroscepticism; Before 1962: Conservative liberalism Economic liberalism Pro-Europeanism
- Political position: Right-wing; Before 1962: Centre-right
- Colours: Blue, White, Red (French Tricolour)
- National Assembly: 0 / 577
- Senate: 0 / 348
- European Parliament: 0 / 74
- Regional Councils: 0 / 17
- Departmental Councils: 0 / 101

Website
- www.cnip.fr

The National Centre of Independents and Peasants (French: Centre national des indépendants et paysans, [sɑ̃tʁ nɑsjɔnal dez‿ɛ̃depɑ̃dɑ̃ e pe.izɑ̃]; CNIP) is a right-wing agrarian political party in France, founded in 1951 by the merger of the National Centre of Independents (CNI), the heir of the French Republican conservative-liberal tradition (many party members came from the Democratic Republican Alliance), with the Peasant Party and the Republican Party of Liberty.

It played a major role during the Fourth Republic (prior to 1958), but since creation of the Fifth Republic, its importance has decreased significantly. The party has mostly run as a minor ally of larger centre-right parties. The CNI and its predecessors have been classical liberal and economically liberal parties largely opposed to the dirigisme of the left, centre and Gaullist right.

== History ==
=== Fourth Republic ===
The Centre National des Indépendants was founded in January 1949 with the aim of uniting centre-right and right-wing parliamentarians, dispersed between a plethora of parties such as the Republican Party of Liberty and other modérés (moderates). It adopted its current name in 1951 after it merged with a split from Paul Antier's small Peasant Party (the successor of the pre-war French Agrarian and Peasant Party - a party that had a corporatist tradition unlike other classically liberal elements in the party).

As the leading right-wing force during the Fourth Republic, it won around 14% of the vote in 1951 and 1956 and participated in Third Force government coalitions, taking a major role in governments at the beginning of the 1950s. Antoine Pinay, its most popular figure, was Prime Minister in 1952, followed by Joseph Laniel from 1953 to 1954. René Coty, a CNIP parliamentarian, was elected President of France in 1953. The party's power declined after the Dien Bien Phu military disaster in Indochina in 1954, and it remained in opposition for most of the last two years of the Fourth Republic after the 1956 elections.

During the Cold War the CNIP was a strongly anti-communist party, strongly supported and financed by employers, colonial and agricultural lobbies. While the CNIP was more economically liberal than the Christian democratic Popular Republican Movement (MRP), like the MRP it supported European integration and NATO. It was a militant defender of French Algeria throughout the Algerian War.

=== Fifth Republic ===
In 1958, it supported Charles de Gaulle's comeback and approved the constitution of the Fifth Republic. Having won over 130 seats in the 1958 election, it was a member of the Gaullist governing coalition until 1962. Antoine Pinay, the Minister of the Economy until 1960, spearheaded a successful monetary reform in 1959 (the introduction of the nouveau franc). However, the party quickly clashed with the Gaullists. It opposed Charles de Gaulle's policy of self-determination in Algeria, disliked his interventionist economic policies, criticized the euroscepticism of De Gaulle and opposed the growing "presidentialisation" of the regime. On October 5, 1962, 107 CNIP deputies voted no-confidence in Georges Pompidou's government, opposing de Gaulle's constitutional reform on the election of the president by universal suffrage. However, the CNIP cabinet ministers, led by future president Valéry Giscard d'Estaing, continued to support de Gaulle. With the support of 24 deputies, they founded their own party, the Independent Republicans (RI).

Severely weakened by the split and its opposition to the October 1962 referendum, it suffered a major defeat in the 1962, left with only a handful of seats. It allied itself with the Popular Republican Movement (MRP) to form the Democratic Centre, later known as Progress and Modern Democracy, in which the CNIP was only a small component.

The party has never regained its former strength and became a marginal conservative group. In the 1980s, it attempted to serve as a 'bridge' between the parliamentary right (RPR and UDF) and the far-right (FN). In the 1986 election, CNIP members appeared on RPR-UDF lists but it won three seats through local alliances with the FN in some departments. In 1997, it formed an ephemeral alliance with Philippe de Villiers' Movement for France.

=== Recent history ===
The CNIP became an associate party of the Union for a Popular Movement in 2002, before it decided to dissociate itself from the party in June 2008. Following the 2007 legislative election it had two seats in the French National Assembly. François Lebel, mayor of the 8th arrondissement of Paris joined the party in April 2008.

Since 2008, it hesitated between pursuing an alliance with President Nicolas Sarkozy's UMP or allying itself with the centrist allies of the presidential majority, most notably Jean-Louis Borloo's Radical Party. It joined the Liaison Committee for the Presidential Majority, a short-lived structuring committee composed of the UMP and its close allies. Gilles Bourdouleix, who took the reins of the party in 2009, announced in 2011 that his party was negotiating an alliance with Borloo's centrist Alliance républicaine, écologiste et sociale. Although these negotiations were unsuccessful, they provoked a major feud with the party's former leader, Annick du Roscoät, who wanted the party to keep its conservative orientation while Bourdouleix has sought to reposition the CNIP towards the centre-right.

In the 2009 European Parliament election, the party ran autonomous lists in three constituencies. However, the party was only able to print ballots in Guyane (2.65%) and Île-de-France (0.42%). In the 2010 regional elections, the CNIP supported some lists led by Nicolas Dupont-Aignan's Arise the Republic while it backed the UMP or dissident right-wing lists in other regions.

On September 19, 2012, Bourdouleix - the party's only remaining deputy - announced that the CNIP was joining Borloo's centre-right Union of Democrats and Independents (UDI). He had already joined the UDI group in the National Assembly in June 2012. But on 10 September, the CNIP was expelled from the UDI after Gilles Bourdouleix had declared the "Maybe Hitler hadn't killed enough Romas".

CNIP joined the Les Amoureux de la France coalition led by Nicolas Dupont-Aignan during the 2019 European Parliament election and was part of the group of parties supporting Eric Zemmour's political party, Reconquête during the 2022 presidential election.

== Electoral results ==
=== Presidential election ===
President of France
Election year	# of overall votes	% of overall vote	Candidate president	Result
1965	13,083,699 (#1)	55.20	Charles de Gaulle	Won
1969	7,943,118 (#2)	41.79	Alain Poher	Lost
1974	13,396,203 (#1)	50.81	Valéry Giscard d'Estaing	Won
1981	14,642,306 (#2)	48.24	Valéry Giscard d'Estaing	Lost
1988	5,031,849 (#3)	16.55	Raymond Barre	Lost
1995	1,443,186 (#7)	4.74	Philippe de Villiers	Lost
2002	25,537,956 (#1)	82.21	Jacques Chirac	Won
2007	18,983,138 (#1)	53.06	Nicolas Sarkozy	Won
2012	16,860,685 (#2)	48.36	Nicolas Sarkozy	Lost
2022	2,485,226 (#4)	7.07	Éric Zemmour	Lost

=== French Parliament ===
National Assembly
Election year	# of overall votes	% of overall vote	# of overall seats won	+/–	Leader
1951	2,563,782 (#4)	13.64	96 / 625	–	Roger Duchet
1956	3,259,782 (#2)	14.99	95 / 595	▼1	Roger Duchet
1958	4,092,600 (#2)	19.9	132 / 546	▲37	Roger Duchet
1962	1,404,177 (#6)	7.66	28 / 491	▼104	Camille Laurens
1967	Ran together with UD-V^{e}		0 / 491	▼28	Camille Laurens
1968	Ran together with UDR		0 / 491	-	Camille Laurens
1973	Ran together with UDR		0 / 491	-	Camille Laurens
1978	Ran together with RPR		8 / 491 (Note: 4 members in the UDF group, 2 in the RPR group, 2 non-affiliated.)	▲8	Bertrand Motte
1981	Ran together with RPR		5 / 491 (Note: 3 members in the UDF group, 2 in the RPR group.)	▼3	Philippe Malaud
1986	Ran together with RPR		5 / 573 (Note: 3 members in the FN group, 2 in the RPR group.)	-	Philippe Malaud
1988	Ran together with RPR		5 / 577	-	Jacques Féron
1993	122,194 (#13)	0.5	2 / 577	▼3	Jean-Antoine Giansily
1997	132,814 (#13)	0.52	0 / 577	▼2	Olivier d'Ormesson
2002	14,403 (#19)	0.06	2 / 577	▲2	Annick du Roscoät
2007	Ran together with UMP		2 / 577	-	Annick du Roscoät
2012	Ran together with UMP		1 / 577	▼1	Gilles Bourdouleix

=== European Parliament ===
European Parliament
Election year	# of overall votes	% of overall vote	# of overall seats won	+/–	Leader
1979*	5,588,851 (#1)	27.61	0 / 81	–	Bertrand Motte
1984**	8,683,596 (#1)	43.03	2 / 81	▲2	Philippe Malaud
1989**	5,242,038 (#1)	28.88	2 / 81	-	Jacques Féron
1994**	4,985,574 (#1)	25.58	0 / 87	▼2	Jean-Antoine Giansily
2009	8,656 (#12)	0.05	0 / 72	-	Annick du Roscoät

Notes

- In 1979, the CNIP was associated to the UDF.
  - From 1984 to 2009, the CNIP was associated to RPR-UDF alliance.

== Leaders ==
Until 1973, the party was led by a secretary-general

- 1949–1961: Roger Duchet
- 1961–1973: Camille Laurens

Since 1973, the party has been led by a president

- 1973–1975: François Schleiter
- 1975–1979: Bertrand Motte
- 1979–1980: collegial leadership (Jacques Fouchier, Maurice Ligot, Raymond Bourgine)
- 1980–1987: Philippe Malaud
- 1987–1989: Jacques Féron
- 1989–1992: Yvon Briant
- 1992–1996: Jean-Antoine Giansily
- 1996–1998: Olivier d'Ormesson
- 1998–1999: Jean Perrin
- 1999–2000: Gérard Bourgoin
- 2000–2009: Annick du Roscoät
- since 2009: Gilles Bourdouleix

== Elected officials ==
- Gilles Bourdouleix (Maine-et-Loire), deputy and mayor of Cholet
