= Papacito =

French far-right influencer and author

- Born: Ugo Gil Jimenez; 14 January 1986 (age 40); Toulouse, France
- Occupations: Influencer; Author; Podcaster
- Years active: 2010s–present

Instagram information
- Page: ugogiljimenez
- Genres: Political commentary, comedy

TikTok information
- Page: ugogiljimenez
- Genres: Political commentary, comedy

YouTube information
- Years active: 2018–2023
- Genres: Political commentary, comedy
- Subscribers: 213,000
- Last updated: June 2023

Papacito (born 14 January 1986) is a French far-right influencer and author. In the early 2010s, he ran the blog Fils de pute de la mode. From 2018, he published several books with Éditions Ring, then with Éditions Magnus, a publishing house he co-founded with former Ring authors. That same year, he began posting videos on YouTube and launched, together with Le Raptor, the Monte une équipe initiative, later taken over by the group Vengeance patriote. A royalist and a Catholic, he advocates an anti-republican political project and an ideal of virility, and several analysts see his humour as a means of spreading far-right propaganda. His YouTube channel was shut down in 2023 following a campaign against the mayor of Montjoi (Tarn-et-Garonne), which led to his conviction in 2024 for homophobic public insults and incitement to hatred. In 2026, he was definitively convicted of publicly insulting a journalist from Mediapart.

== Biography ==
=== Early life ===
Papacito, whose real name is Ugo Gil Jimenez, was born on 14 January 1986 in Toulouse. He grew up in Plaisance-du-Touch. His Spanish grandparents fought against Francoism during the Spanish Civil War (his maternal grandfather was a former anarchist of the CNT-FAI, from whom he says he inherited "a radical streak"), and his parents were political refugees. His father was a specialised social worker, and his mother, initially a secretary, became a Spanish teacher.

He attended the Lycée du Mirail in Toulouse, then studied Spanish and sociology in Paris from 2006 to 2008. For several years, he worked as a security guard, caretaker, construction worker, removal man, bouncer and supervisor in middle and high schools. He provided security at ferias and for François Asselineau. Until 2023, he also taught children at a boxing club in a working-class neighbourhood of Toulouse. Paul Conge also describes him as an "apprentice actor". In Paris, he performed unsuccessfully in a one-man show under the stage name Ugocentrique, using material written by others. After his marriage, he resumed studies in socio-anthropology at the University of Toulouse-Le Mirail.

In his youth, he put up posters for the French Communist Party in Toulouse, which he joined at 18 and from which he says he was expelled for being "too Stalinist", and later for the Left Front in Arcueil. He attributes his political shift to his years working in security, during which he says he was confronted with crime. He also says he was deeply affected by the killings committed by Mohammed Merah in 2012. Conge describes him as a royalist and a Catholic, and as "a political man without a party".

=== Blogging ===
In the early 2010s, he began running the blog Fils de pute de la mode (lit. 'Son of a bitch of fashion', abbreviated FDP de la mode), which brought him to public attention. According to Le Point, he did not create it; the blog was launched by an Irish friend, but he soon became its sole contributor. By his own account, the name came to him after a removal job that same year at the home of a fashion designer who refused to let him use the toilet because he was sweating. He says he felt class contempt and conceived the blog as a retaliation against that milieu. The blog attacked the dress codes and lifestyle of left-wing bourgeois, whom it associated with homosexuality in insulting terms, which Conge interprets as the denunciation of a cultural capitulation. Against them, it set a virility of the middle and working classes based on the cult of the body. In 2012, the site had 35,000 visitors a day. Paul Conge calls FDP de la mode "one of the first hate blogs in the history of the Internet". He cites in particular a post in which Papacito recommends raping a woman and beating her if she wants to file a complaint. Papacito also praised Saddam Hussein, Vladimir Putin and Franco on the blog. The blog also hosted guest contributors who made similar statements.

=== Literary career ===
Papacito went on to publish with Éditions Ring, which made him one of their "headliners" alongside Marsault and Laurent Obertone. His comic book FDP de la mode, adapted from the blog, was drawn by Marsault and published in two volumes. In it, a militarised character kicks "the fragile" (bobos, vegans, feminists, fashionistas) with combat boots. The book sold several tens of thousands of copies. In 2021, he left Ring, as did Marsault and Obertone, after the publishing house was put up for sale. Together with them and publisher Laura Magné, all former staff and contributors at Ring, he went on to found Éditions Magnus and the quarterly magazine La Furia, in which he writes a column and which presents itself as a far-right Hara-Kiri. He says he lives off his book sales, as his YouTube channel was never monetised.

=== Influencer activities ===
From 2018, Papacito posted videos on YouTube, first a series titled Comment devenir un mac (lit. 'How to become a pimp'), then a series of Entretiens chocs (lit. 'Shock interviews'), released between February 2018 and December 2019, as promotional material for his books. Each Entretien choc opens with the phrase "I have come to honour and I have come to punish", announcing an alternation between praise for men he admires and denunciation of his opponents. In June 2023, his channel had 213,000 subscribers. His Entretiens chocs, however, were published on the channel of his publisher Ring. The six parts of this interview were the most-viewed videos on Ring's channel in 2021. According to a study published in 2022, his videos had accumulated more than 10.5 million views by that year. Banned from Twitter in 2021, when he had nearly 75,000 followers there, he then built an audience on Instagram. After a first appearance on La France libre, the web TV channel of Gilles-William Goldnadel, he was invited by André Bercoff on Sud Radio from 2018 onwards. He was a regular guest of Valeurs actuelles and Sud Radio, where he appeared five times between 2019 and 2021. His interview released in October 2020 on VA Plus, the video channel of Valeurs actuelles, was at the time the most-viewed video on that channel. He has also appeared on Boulevard Voltaire and is a regular on TV Libertés programmes.

According to Conge, Papacito belongs, along with other video makers such as Le Raptor, to a "galaxy of alt-right influencers", initially influenced by the videos of Alain Soral before publicly distancing themselves from him, deeming him too "Islamophile". Tristan Boursier classifies him among the "idea-spreading influencers", who attract a large audience in order to direct it towards "ideologue influencers" such as Julien Rochedy. According to Boursier, his videos also serve as a showcase leading to messaging apps such as Telegram and Signal, where these influencers spread more radical messages. In 2018, he was among the YouTubers approached by the rapper Kroc Blanc to found a joint company called "Fachosphère", after the term "fachosphère" (a blend of "facho", French slang for "fascist", and "sphère"), which refers to the far-right ecosystem on the Internet. The application submitted to the Le Coquetier incubator was not accepted, and the project failed.

Le Raptor, with whom Papacito founded Monte une équipe.

That same year, Papacito and Le Raptor launched Monte une équipe (lit. 'Build a team'), a project inviting their followers to form local groups of men, called "teams", which was meant to lead to a social network. From April 2018, they promoted it during the Rendez-vous dissidents, live broadcasts on Sunday evenings on Le Raptor's channel. Each week, they called a young man who had built a "team" in his town. They also created a website, MonteUneEquipe.com, and hundreds of young nationalists formed groups across France. The two YouTubers left the project in the summer of 2018. According to StreetPress, they had been overwhelmed and were unable to structure the movement. In October 2018, the white supremacist activist Daniel Conversano attempted to take over the movement. He used the popularity of Monte une équipe to recruit members into Équipe Paris, the Parisian branch of his website Suavelos, which brings together far-right activists who support white separatism. In the spring of 2019, a former Action Française activist relaunched the initiative under the name Vengeance patriote. In 2020, the group had around 400 members spread across some thirty local sections, which trained in combat and shooting. According to StreetPress, Papacito and Le Raptor sought to make people forget their involvement in the project.

In 2019, Papacito faced the nationalist YouTuber John Gauthier in a boxing ring, after Gauthier had called him a "clown" and a "fake manly man" in a video. Broadcast on YouTube on a delayed basis, the fight was watched by 47,000 viewers. Papacito won by technical knockout in the second round. In 2020, a video supportive of Professor Didier Raoult earned him around 30,000 new subscribers in one month.

In May 2021, Mediapart revealed that his name appeared in a confidential report by the prosecutor's office of the Paris Court of Appeal on the ultradroite. According to military historian Cédric Mas, an internal intelligence services memo describes his homophobia, racism and sexism. In June 2021, he released a video with the YouTuber Code-Reinho in which he shoots at a mannequin meant to represent a voter of La France Insoumise. Mas considers that it borrows the codes of jihadist propaganda, with the target, the knife and the orange outfit. By then, he had already sent written threats to journalists from Libération and Mediapart. Removed by YouTube the day after its release, the video led to complaints from Fabien Roussel and Jean-Luc Mélenchon and to a judicial investigation. According to France Inter, his channel gained around 12,000 subscribers in the following three days, representing 10% of its total audience.

Papacito was due to take part in a feature film telling the story of a French lordship fighting the English in 1429, alongside Julien Rochedy and Thaïs d'Escufon, a former spokesperson for Génération Identitaire. The project was backed by the company Terre de France, which also sponsored the mannequin video, and the film was scheduled for release in 2022. It never materialised for lack of funding.

From 2022, Papacito led a video campaign against Christian Eurgal, mayor of Montjoi (Tarn-et-Garonne), whom he accused of favouring a British national at the expense of the pig farmer Pierre-Guillaume Mercadal. He had met the farmer a few years earlier on Christian discussion forums and featured him in his videos. In November 2022, he launched a fundraiser for the farmer, which reached €276,000. In 2023, his video "Infestation de fouines à Montjoi" (lit. 'Weasel infestation in Montjoi') exceeded 500,000 views in less than a month and triggered a wave of harassment against the mayor, who was placed under police protection. In 2023, YouTube shut down his channel for "harassment" and "cyberbullying" following this campaign. He then fell back on TikTok and Instagram. In 2024, he was fined €5,000 for homophobic public insults and incitement to hatred against the mayor. As of 2026, he lives in Andalusia and hosts the podcast Burger Ring, which regularly ranks among the fifteen most-listened-to podcasts in France on Spotify.

== Views ==
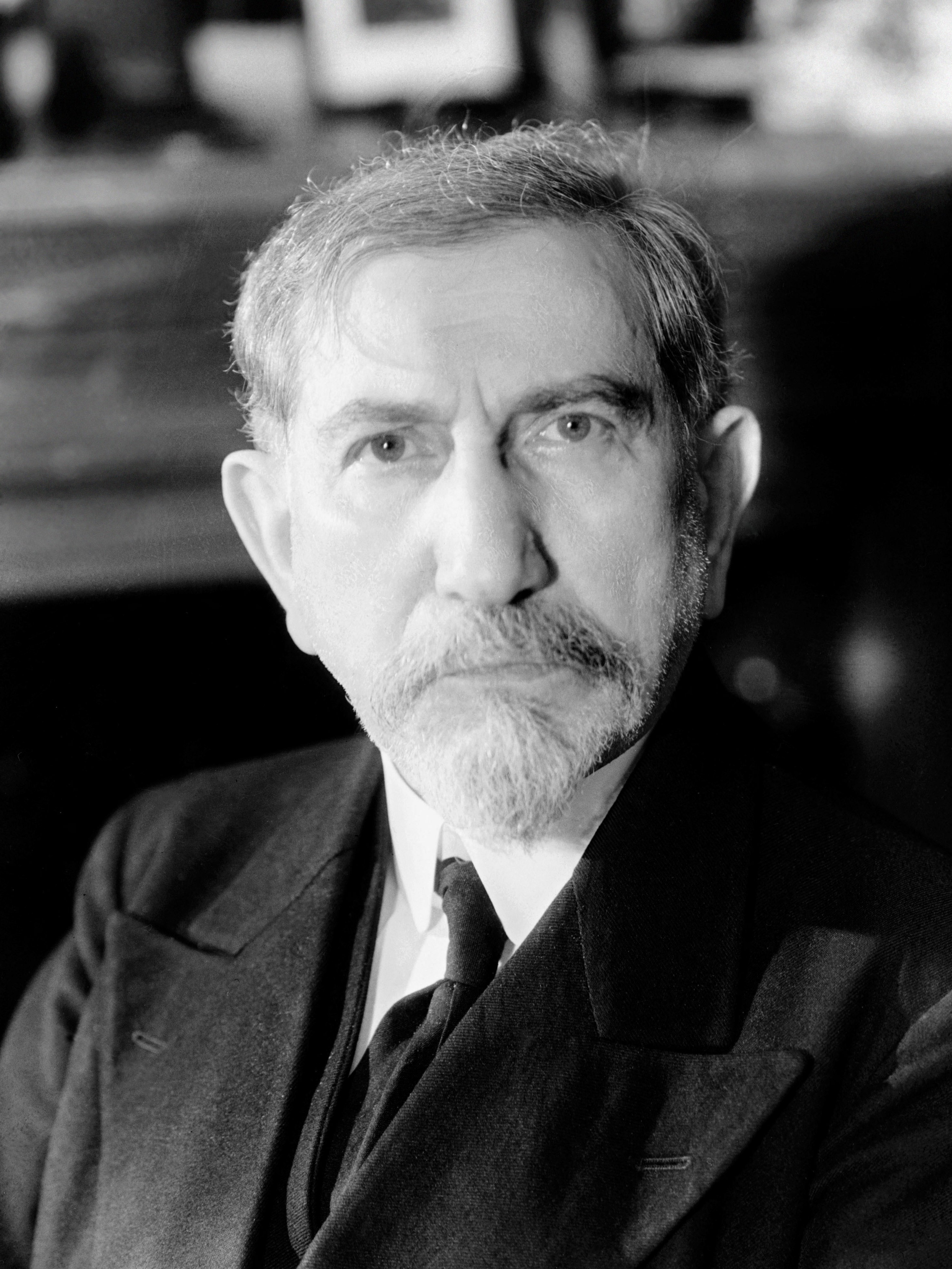
Charles Maurras, one of Papacito's main ideological influences.

Tristan Boursier describes Papacito's political project as "anti-republican, royalist, masculinist", sharing several traits with the most radical fringes of the far right, such as opposition to the rule of law and the promotion of violence. Paul Laubacher presents him as a monarchist, an admirer of General Franco and a self-proclaimed Christian, and notes that he rejects the far-right label. According to Libération, he also describes himself as a sedevacantist. He expresses sympathy for the ideas of Jean-Marie Le Pen and Éric Zemmour, who himself calls him a "friend". In the 2022 French presidential election, he supported Zemmour, for whom he voted in the first round, then voted for Marine Le Pen in the second. He takes up a Maurrassian critique of the Republic, which he blames for the weakening of the nation and of men and portrays as a Masonic conspiracy, and uses the Maurrassian expressions "pays réel" (lit. 'real country') and "anti-France". During Zemmour's campaign, he saw him as "the providential man capable of mobilising the army", able to "break out of the republican framework" and to create the conditions for a restoration of the monarchy in favour of Louis de Bourbon, whom he calls "Louis XX". In 2021, he advocated summary justice "like in the film Judge Dredd, where drug addicts are shot dead in the street". Boursier notes that he also looks favourably on the idea of a minimal libertarian state that would allow citizens to own weapons and use them freely on their property.

Boursier highlights Papacito's warlike vocabulary: he treats his political opponents as enemies and their allies as "collaborators", and regularly refers to civil war and to the post-war purge. In 2020, he asserted that France was "at war". He regularly predicts an ethnic civil war. Asked by Valeurs actuelles about the ideal state, he mentioned units tasked with purging "collaborators" and re-education camps. He does, however, criticise the ethno-racialist currents of white supremacy. Boursier writes that he recalls "that after World War I the French people underwent 'a genetic selection of the weak', thus going against social Darwinism", and that he "therefore says he is more attentive to the contribution of extra-European elements to 'strengthen the French people'". This relative caution earns him the hostility of the most radical elements of the movement, who nickname him "Kipacito" and criticise him for not criticising Israel. The leader of Jeune Nation, Yvan Benedetti, regards him with contempt.

Papacito contrasts an ideal of virility with men he considers effeminate, whom he calls, among other things, "soy boys". He laments the decline of the peasantry, the police, the army and the terroir, which he attributes to the "Canal+ spirit". He contrasts a Republic he portrays as founded by effeminate men with a monarchy associated with the warlike strength of the Germanic kings. Conge places him among the far-right influencers who have made the crisis of masculinity their "stock-in-trade" through lifestyle coaching. In a study of the antifeminist humour of Le Raptor and Papacito, Vey and Perrier likewise analyse their discourse as a discourse of the crisis of masculinity. According to them, Papacito links the supposed decline of white men in France to the rise of non-white men presented as foreigners, and conversely praises the virility he attributes to countries of the Global South. The word "feminism" does not appear in any of the fifteen Papacito videos they studied, but the authors consider that feminists are indeed targeted. The two authors conclude that it amounts to a "fascho-masculinism".

Papacito says that, as a bouncer, he had recurring conflicts with Maghrebis, with whom he considers any understanding impossible. He sees the peri-urban middle class as a buffer between bourgeois city centres and the banlieuess. He also attacks foreigners he considers insufficiently "integrated", and specifies that his Congolese wife is a "true French patriot" who shares his Catholic faith and traditional values. Conge writes that "Petits Blancs in contact with the underclass" are his "core target". Political scientist Jean-Yves Camus attributes to him an obsession with "Islam. Not political Islam or radical Islam, just Islam". Two days after the murder of Samuel Paty, he declared on Sud Radio that "in every Muslim, if sufficiently stimulated, there are the seeds to commit murder, to attack a Frenchman who is not Muslim".

Romain Fargier describes Papacito as "fascinated by the Middle Ages". He cites Cyrano de Bergerac as a rhetorical model. He also praises leaders such as Saddam Hussein and Rodrigo Duterte. Vey and Perrier also cite Vladimir Putin, Bashar al-Assad and Muammar Gaddafi among the autocrats he holds up as models, and note that he praises them in particular when he attributes racist behaviour to them. He also asserts that Italian fascism and Francoism "have nothing to do with Nazism" and that they are "viable regimes". According to Boursier, his thinking draws on references widespread on the far right since the 2010s: Nietzsche's concept of the Übermensch, Antonio Gramsci's concept of cultural hegemony and Renaud Camus's Great Replacement conspiracy theory.

Vey and Perrier note that Papacito sometimes presents himself as a "conveyor of ideas" and at other times as a mere comedian with no political message. They analyse his humour, based on excess and hyperbole, as a means of spreading far-right propaganda while presenting it as tongue-in-cheek. Fargier likewise sees sarcasm and irony as the "trademark" of far-right influencers such as Papacito, allowing them to get their ideas across and avoid platform censorship.

== Audience ==
Conge describes his audience as a fan base of "white men in their thirties", who form long queues at his book signings. The man who slapped Emmanuel Macron on 8 June 2021 was among those who followed his videos. According to Mathieu Slama, he is widely followed by young people, and his audience overlaps with activist far-right circles. In 2021, his admirers raised €35,000 in five days to buy him a four-wheel drive.

== Legal cases ==
=== Mannequin video (2021) ===
In 2021, Papacito posted a video on YouTube titled "Le gauchiste est-il pare-balles ?" (lit. 'Is the leftist bulletproof?'). In this video with the YouTuber Code-Reinho, who specialises in firearms, he shoots at a mannequin meant to represent a left-wing voter, then attacks it with a knife, and explains how to legally obtain weapons in France. The video was subsequently removed from YouTube. Roussel and Mélenchon filed complaints. Papacito claimed it was humour. An investigation was opened for "public incitement, not followed by action, to commit attacks on the life or physical integrity of persons". At the end of 2021, the prosecutor's office dropped the case. In 2022, Mélenchon and La France Insoumise filed a new complaint, as civil parties, for incitement to murder or to attacks on the physical integrity of persons.

=== Video targeting Lucie Delaporte (2021) ===
In 2021, Papacito posted on YouTube, with the influencers Georges Matharan, Baptiste Marchais and Julien Rochedy, a video nearly an hour and a half long directed against journalists, in particular Lucie Delaporte, who was then covering the far right for Mediapart and had analysed their humour in her articles. She was targeted with degrading and sexist remarks. In 2026, Papacito and Matharan were found guilty of publicly insulting the journalist. They were each fined €500 and ordered to pay her €3,000 in damages. Rochedy was acquitted, and Marchais, initially implicated, who had moved to Texas, was not tried. Papacito did not appeal, and his sentence is now final.

=== Video targeting Pierre Plottu (2022) ===
On 19 June 2022, journalist Pierre Plottu, a specialist of the radical far right and a contributor to Libération, posted on Twitter a video clip in which Papacito announces that he will come to see him "with equipment" in the event of a collapse, while claiming he means nothing violent. Plottu filed a complaint for cyberharassment and threats.

=== Montjoi affair (2023) ===
In 2022, Papacito posted a video in which he sided with Pierre-Guillaume Mercadal, a pig farmer in a dispute with a British national over the use of a path in Montjoi, a village in Tarn-et-Garonne. In it, he accuses the mayor, Christian Eurgal, whom he compares to a weasel, of having been bribed by the British national. The video exceeded 500,000 views in less than a month. After intimidation and death threats, the mayor was placed under police protection. Admirers of Papacito travelled to Montjoi and used spray paint to mark the way to the mayor's home. In 2024, Papacito was found guilty of homophobic public insults and incitement to hatred against the mayor of Montjoi, and was fined €5,000. He was acquitted on three other counts.

=== Imane Khelif affair (2024) ===
In 2024, during the Paris Olympic Games, Papacito portrayed the Algerian boxer Imane Khelif on TikTok and Instagram as a man fighting among women. This campaign led to his being sent to trial before the criminal court. The hearing, scheduled for 2026, was postponed to early 2027.

== Publications ==
=== Comics (text by Papacito, art by Marsault) ===
- FDP de la mode, vol. 1, Enculés, va !, Éditions Ring, 2018
- FDP de la mode, vol. 2, L'Ultime Croisade, Éditions Ring, 2019
- Expérience de mort imminente, Magnus, 2023
- Dino Brutal Age, Magnus, 2024 ISBN 978-2-38422-062-5

=== Books ===
- Carnets de guerre. Journal satirique, Éditions Ring, 2018 (reissued by Magnus, 2023)
- Crépuscule des titans, Éditions Ring, 2019 (reissued by Magnus, 2023)
- Expédition punitive. Journal satirique, Éditions Ring, 2020 (reissued by Magnus, 2023)
- Veni vidi vici. Menace sur les gauchistes, with Julien Rochedy, Éditions Hétairie, 2021
- Siècle furieux, Magnus, 2022, with Antoine de Lagausie

== Bibliography ==
- Conge, Paul (2020). Les Grands-Remplacés. Vox' (in French). Paris: Arkhê. ISBN 978-2-918682-69-1.
- Vey, Victor; Perrier, Zoé (Winter 2022). "L'humour antiféministe du Raptor et de Papacito : analyse d'une stratégie énonciative de l'extrême-droite en ligne" [The antifeminist humour of Le Raptor and Papacito: analysis of an enunciative strategy of the online far right]. Cahiers de recherche en politique appliquée (in French). 8 (1): 64–81. doi:10.17118/11143/20116. hdl:11143/20116.
