= Maine-et-Loire's 5th constituency =

Constituency of the National Assembly of France

5th constituency of Maine-et-Loire
- inline Constituency of the National Assembly of France

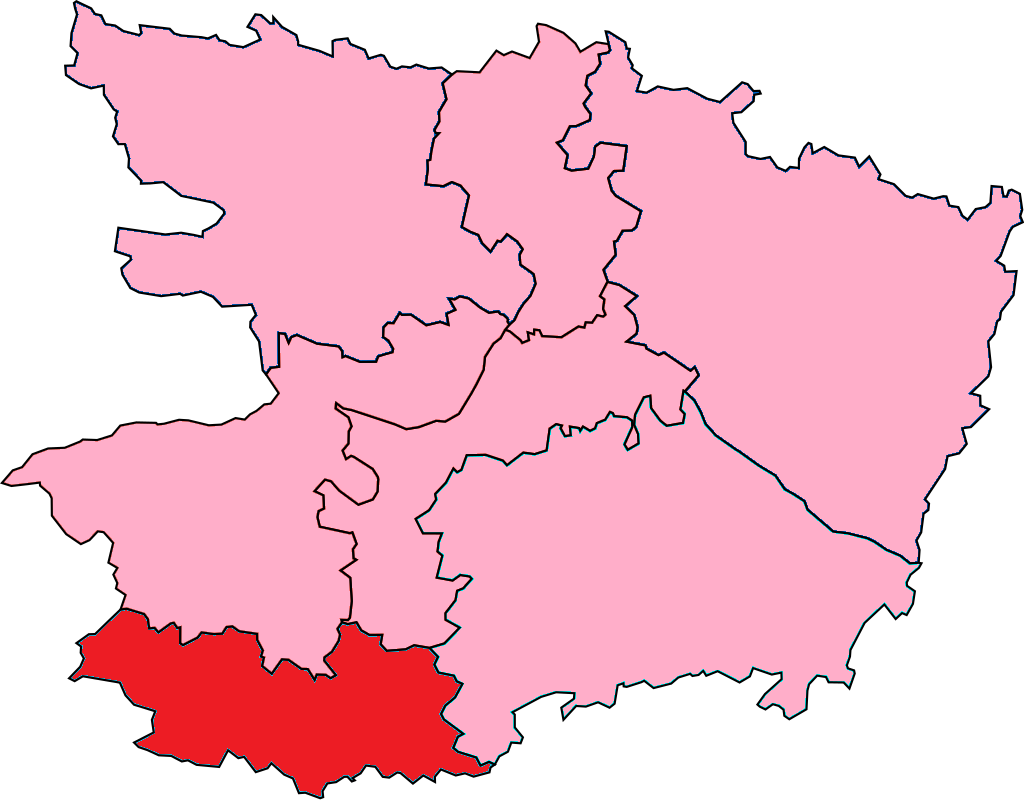
- Maine-et-Loire's 5th Constituency shown within Maine-et-Loire
- Deputy: Denis Masséglia; RE
- Department: Maine-et-Loire
- Cantons: Cholet I, Cholet II, Cholet III, Montfaucon
- Registered voters: 77379

The 5th constituency of Maine-et-Loire (French: Cinquième circonscription de Maine-et-Loire) is a French legislative constituency in the Maine-et-Loire département. Like the other 576 French constituencies, it elects one MP using a two round electoral system.

== Description ==
The 5th Constituency of Maine-et-Loire is situated in the south of the department. It includes the town of Cholet.

Politically the seat has historically favoured centre right candidates until the En Marche! landslide of 2017 when their candidate, Denis Masséglia, came close to winning in the first round.

== Assembly members ==
| Election | Member | Party |
|---|---|---|
| 1988 | Maurice Ligot | UDF |
| 1993 | Maurice Ligot | UDF |
| 1997 | Maurice Ligot | UDF |
| 2002 | Gilles Bourdouleix | UMP |
| 2007 | Gilles Bourdouleix | UMP |
| 2012 | Gilles Bourdouleix | UMP |
| 2017 | Denis Masséglia | LREM |
| 2022 | Denis Masséglia | RE |

== Election results ==
=== 2024 ===
| Candidate | Party | Alliance | First round | | Second round | |
| Candidate | Party | Alliance | Votes | % | Votes | % |
|---|---|---|---|---|---|---|
| Denis Masséglia | REN | Ensemble | 17,730 | 33.70 | 33,204 | |
| Gilles Bourdouleix | LR | UXD | 16,066 | 30.54 | 17,310 | 34.21 |
| France Moreau | LFI | NPF | 11,220 | 21.33 | 82 | 0.16 |
| Jacquelin Ligot | LR | | 5,362 | 10.19 | | |
| Frédéric Guyard | DLF | DSV | 822 | 1.56 | | |
| Didier Testu | LO | | 821 | 1.56 | | |
| Véronique Estang | R | | 583 | 1.11 | | |
| Valid votes | | | 52,604 | 96.81 | 50,596 | 94.24 |
| Blank votes | | | 1,207 | 2.22 | 2,298 | 4.28 |
| Null votes | | | 529 | 0.97 | 795 | 0.99 |
| Turnout | | | 54,340 | 67.84 | 53,689 | 67.01 |
| Abstentions | | | 25,757 | 32.16 | 26,436 | 32.99 |
| Registered voters | | | 80,097 | | 80,125 | |
| Result | | | RE HOLD | | | |

=== 2022 ===
Legislative Election 2022: Maine-et-Loire's 5th constituency
| Party | Candidate | Votes | % | ±% |
|---|---|---|---|---|
| LREM (Ensemble) | Denis Masséglia | 11,073 | 31.63 | -16.00 |
| LFI (NUPÉS) | Christophe Airaud | 8,039 | 22.96 | +4.75 |
| DVD | Jacquelin Ligot | 6,472 | 18.48 | N/A |
| RN | Sigline De Campeau | 4,588 | 13.10 | +5.80 |
| LREM | Jean-Michel Debarre* | 2,150 | 6.14 | N/A |
| REC | Valérie Gorioux | 1,025 | 2.93 | N/A |
| DLF (UPF) | Frédéric Guyard | 719 | 2.05 | N/A |
| LO | Didier Testu | 524 | 1.50 | N/A |
| PA | Hervé Fusil | 423 | 1.21 | N/A |
| Turnout | | 35,013 | 45.34 | −3.40 |
2nd round result
| LREM (Ensemble) | Denis Masséglia | 19,395 | 60.76 | -7.61 |
| LFI (NUPÉS) | Christophe Airaud | 12,525 | 39.24 | N/A |
| Turnout | | 31,920 | 43.34 | +4.34 |
| LREM hold | | | | |

* LREM dissident

=== 2017 ===
Legislative Election 2017: Maine-et-Loire's 5th constituency
| Party | Candidate | Votes | % | ±% |
|---|---|---|---|---|
| LREM | Denis Masséglia | 17,966 | 47.63 | |
| DVD | Patrice Brault | 8,017 | 21.26 | |
| LFI | Kévin Certenais | 3,197 | 8.48 | |
| FN | Lucie Pineau | 2,753 | 7.30 | |
| EELV | Franck Louseau | 2,101 | 5.57 | |
| PS | Jean-Marc Vacher | 1,568 | 4.16 | |
| Others | N/A | 2,115 | | |
| Turnout | | 37,717 | 48.74 | |
2nd round result
| LREM | Denis Masséglia | 20,631 | 68.37 | |
| DVD | Patrice Brault | 9,545 | 31.63 | |
| Turnout | | 30,176 | 39.00 | |
| LREM gain from LR | | | | |

=== 2012 ===
Legislative Election 2012: Maine-et-Loire's 5th constituency
| Party | Candidate | Votes | % | ±% |
|---|---|---|---|---|
| UMP | Gilles Bourdouleix | 17,994 | 42.02 | |
| PS | Laurence Adrien-Bigeon | 15,226 | 35.55 | |
| FN | Danielle Duret | 2,910 | 6.80 | |
| MoDem | Xavier Coiffard | 2,247 | 5.25 | |
| FG | Aurélie Monrouzeau | 1,303 | 3.04 | |
| AC | Philippe Renaudet | 1,113 | 2.60 | |
| EELV | Pierre Chalopin | 1,070 | 2.50 | |
| Others | N/A | 961 | | |
| Turnout | | 42,824 | 56.83 | |
2nd round result
| UMP | Gilles Bourdouleix | 21,287 | 51.07 | |
| PS | Laurence Adrien-Bigeon | 20,397 | 48.93 | |
| Turnout | | 41,684 | 55.32 | |
| UMP hold | | | | |
