= Le Journal du Dimanche =

French weekly newspaper

- Type: Weekly newspaper
- Format: Large tabloid
- Owner: Hachette Filipacchi Médias
- Founder: Pierre Lazareff
- Founded: 1948; 78 years ago
- Language: French
- Headquarters: Paris
- Country: France
- Circulation: 151,007 (2020)
- ISSN: 0242-3065 (print); 2650-0027 (web)
- Website: lejdd.fr

Le Journal du Dimanche (French pronunciation: [lə ʒuʁnal dy dimɑ̃ʃ]; lit. 'Sunday's newspaper'), also known as the JDD [ʒidede], is a French weekly newspaper published on Sundays in France.

JDD was bought in 2023 by Vivendi of media mogul Vincent Bolloré, triggering a strike movement against the new editorial stance perceived as far-right.

== History and profile ==
Le Journal du Dimanche was created by Pierre Lazareff in 1948. He was managing editor of France Soir at that time.

The weekly paper belongs to the Lagardère Group through Hachette Filipacchi Médias. The company is also the publisher of the paper which is based in Paris and which is published on Sundays.

Le Journal du Dimanche was published in broadsheet format until 1999 when it began to be published in the Berliner format. On 6 March 2011 the paper again changed its format to large tabloid format.

In the period of 2001–2002, Le Journal du Dimanche had a circulation of 275,000 copies. In 2010, this had decreased slightly to 257,280 copies, but by 2020, it had dropped to 151,007 copies.

=== 2023 strike after takeover by Vivendi ===
On 23 June 2023, days after the takeover of Lagardère group by Vivendi, the appointment of Geoffroy Lejeune as editor-in-chief was announced, just a few days after he had been fired from his position as editorial director of the far-right-wing weekly magazine Valeurs Actuelles. This set off a firestorm among the editorial staff, 93% of whom voted to go on strike on 22 June to protest against this potential arrival, thought to have been engineered by Vincent Bolloré. One month later, negotiations were broken off again when the Lagardère group confirmed that Lejeune would take over editorial control of the newspaper on 1 August. 98% of the journalists voted to continue the longest strike in the newspaper's history. This vote made the strike longer than the 31-day strike at I-Tele when the latter was transformed into CNews after being taken over by Canal+, whose oversight committee is also chaired by Bolloré. The European Commission opened a formal investigation into Vivendi's takeover of Lagardère group on 25 July for potential violation of European Union rules.

On 1 August, journalists voted to abandon the strike after reaching an agreement on severance terms for those intending to leave the newspaper as a result of the change.

It was revealed in June 2024 that 95% of the journalists left the newspaper after the change.

== Staff ==
- Alain Genestar
- Jean-Claude Maurice between 1999 and December 2005
- Jacques Espérandieu (ex-Le Parisien) between December 2005 and May 2008
- Christian de Villeneuve between May 2008 and February 2010
- Olivier Jay between March 2010 and December 2011
- Jérôme Bellay (2011–2016)
- Hervé Gattegno (2016–2021)
- Jérôme Bellay (2021–2022)
- Jérôme Béglé, (January 2022 – June 2023)
- Geoffroy Lejeune (since June 2023)
