= Maurice Ligot =

French administrator and politician (1927–2022)

Member of the French National Assembly
- In office 23 June 1988 – 18 June 2002
- Preceded by: Proportional representation
- Succeeded by: Gilles Bourdouleix
- Constituency: Maine-et-Loire's 5th constituency
- In office 2 April 1986 – 14 May 1988
- Preceded by: position established
- Succeeded by: position abolished
- Constituency: Proportional representation
- In office 3 April 1978 – 1 April 1986
- Preceded by: Jean Huchon
- Succeeded by: Proportional representation
- Constituency: Maine-et-Loire's 5th constituency
- In office 2 April 1973 – 27 September 1976
- Preceded by: René Le Bault de La Morinière
- Succeeded by: Jean Huchon
- Constituency: Maine-et-Loire's 5th constituency

Mayor of Cholet
- In office 1965–1995
- Preceded by: Georges Prisset
- Succeeded by: Gilles Bourdouleix

Personal details
- Born: 9 December 1927 Niort, France
- Died: 29 October 2022 (aged 94) Cholet, France
- Party: CNIP; UDF
- Education: Sciences Po; École nationale d'administration
- Occupation: Civil administrator

Maurice Ligot (9 December 1927 – 29 October 2022) was a French civil administrator and politician. He served in the National Assembly from 1973 to 1975 and again from 1978 to 2002 in Maine-et-Loire's 5th constituency. He was Mayor of Cholet from 1965 to 1995 and served as Secretary of State of Civil Service from 1976 to 1978. In 1988, he co-founded the Fédération des maires des villes moyennes alongside Jean Auroux, which became the Fédération des villes de France in 2014.

== Biography ==
=== Youth and education ===
Maurice was the son of Maurice Alexandre Ligot and Madeleine Rousseau. He studied at Sciences Po and the École nationale d'administration.

=== Career ===
Ligot began working for the Secretary-General for African and Malagasy Affairs, Jacques Foccart, one of the closest advisors of President Charles de Gaulle. He was subsequently chief of staff for Minister of the Interior Roger Frey. With the exception of an appointment by President Valéry Giscard d'Estaing as Secretary of State of Civil Service from 1976 to 1978, he was a deputy of the National Assembly from 1973 to 2002.

At the end of the 19th Century, Célestin Port noted that the commune of Cholet did not have a museum or a library. This did not change until Ligot's mayorship, with a permanent library opening in 1984 and the Musée d'Art et d'Histoire de Cholet opening in 1993. Additionally, a new town hall was opened in 1976 and a new hospice opened the following year.

=== Death ===
Maurice Ligot died in Cholet on 29 October 2022, at the age of 94.

== Publications ==
- Les accords de coopération entre la France et les États africains et malgache d'expression française (1964)
- Un territoire, une passion (1993)
- 1965-1995, l'audace d'une ville : Cholet (1995)
- Contributions parlementaires pour l'élargissement de l'Union européenne : Chypre, Lituanie et Turquie : Rapport d'information de l'Assemblée nationale (2002)
- Osez entreprendre (2003)
- Un maire, une ville (2015)
- Édouard Corniglion-Molinier, un paladin au xxe siècle (2019)
