= Laurent Dandrieu =

French journalist, music and art critic

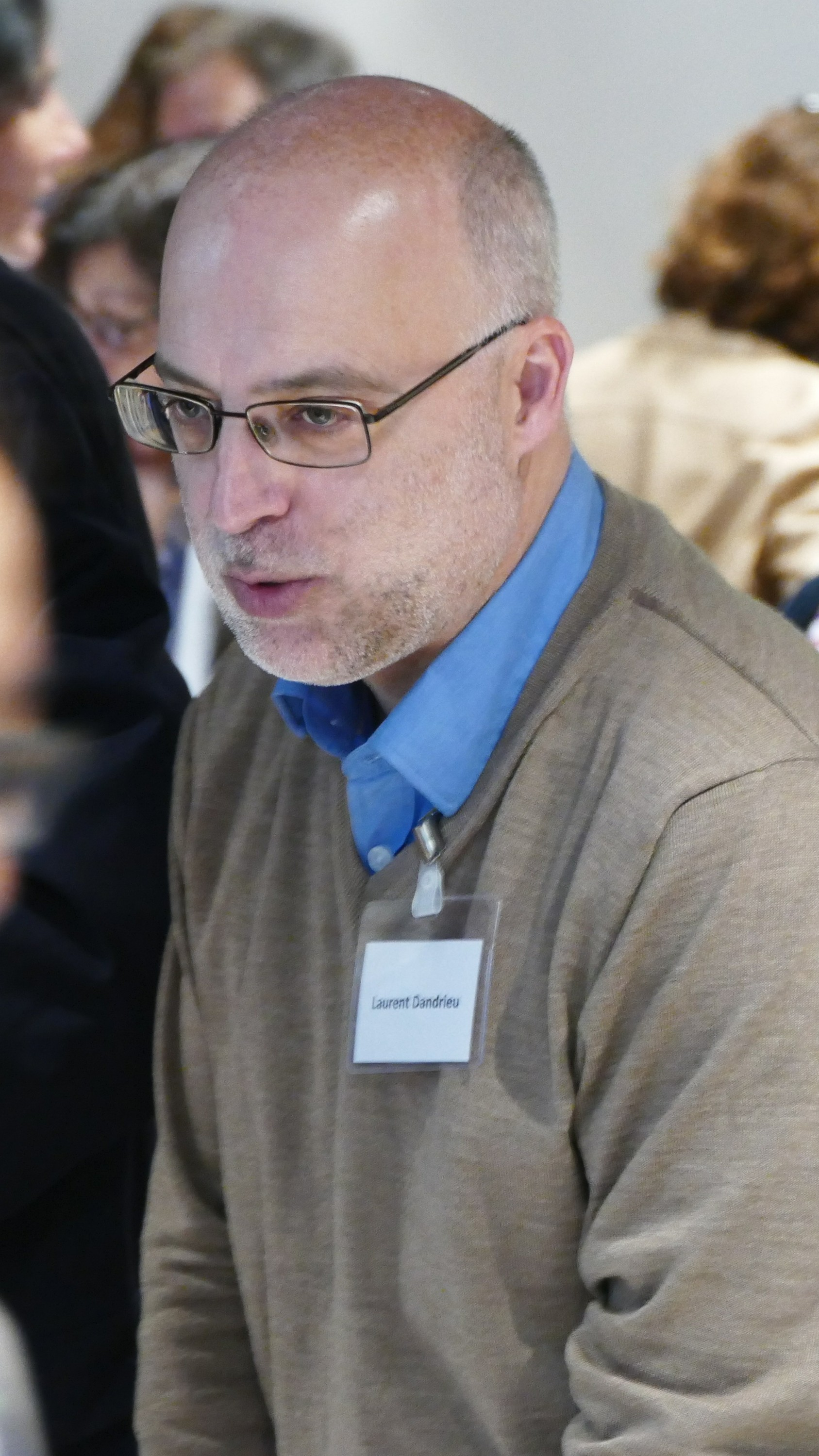
- Laurent Dandrieu at Salon du livre et de la famille in 2015
- Born: Laurent Jacquet; 12 July 1963 (age 62)
- Occupations: Journalist; Film critic Art critic

Laurent Dandrieu (born 12 July 1963 in Rome) is a French journalist, music and art critic.

== Career ==
Laurent Jacquet chose the pen name Laurent Dandrieu (which, according to the Observatoire des journalistes et de l'information médiatique, he made up from the name of his fetish author), wrote in the magazine Reaction (1990–1994) and became a freelancer for Le Spectacle du Monde in 1994.

He also worked as a freelance writer for the cultural pages of the Valeurs actuelles weekly where he has been a film critic since 1998, then became the head of culture for the magazine in 1999 and then became deputy editor-in-chief, first responsible for culture, and since 2007, the debates/opinions pages, and from October 2009 to June 2013, editor of the valeursactuelles.com website. He is Associate Editor for pages related to society and in 2016 became editor of the culture pages.

== Works ==
- 2000: Woody Allen, portrait d'un antimoderne. Paris: CNRS. 2010. p. 301. ISBN 978-2-271-06674-9.
- 2013: Dictionnaire passionné du cinéma;=6000 films à voir ou à fuir. Paris: L'Homme nouveau. 2013. p. 1403. ISBN 978-2-915988-66-6.
- 2014: La Compagnie des anges; petite vie de Fra Angelico. Paris: Éditions du Cerf. 9 October 2014. p. 99. ISBN 978-2-204-10274-2.
- 2015: Le Roi et l'Architecte; Louis XIV, le Bernin et la fabrique de la gloire. Paris: Le Cerf. 2015. p. 197. ISBN 978-2-204-10648-1.
- 2016: Les Peintres de l'invisible; le Greco, Rembrandt, Vermeer et autres messagers de l'infini. Paris: Le Cerf..
- 2017: Église et immigration, le grand malaise; le pape et le suicide de la civilisation européenne. Paris: Presses de la Renaissance. p. 311.

=== Chapters ===
- 2000: Chapter ?, in Michka Assayas (dir.), Dictionnaire du rock : blues, country, folk, pop, reggae, rock indépendant, soul, Paris, Éditions Robert Laffont, series " Bouquins" BnF 3720427
- 2012: Philippe Barthelet [in French], ed. (2012). Du bon usage des illusions: Woody Allen et Gustave Thibon. Les Dossiers H. Paris: L'Âge d'homme. ISBN 978-2-8251-4142-7.
- 2002: Philippe Barthelet; Pierre-Guillaume de Roux, eds. (2012). De la politique comme libre exercice des passions. Paris: Pierre-Guillaume de Roux. ISBN 978-2-36371-040-6.
- 2013: Chapitre ?, in Jean-Paul Bled, Edmond Jouve, Christophe Réveillard (dir.), Dictionnaire historique et juridique de l'Europe, Paris, Presses universitaires de France, series " Major : service public", ISBN 978-2-13-060835-6 BnF 43577240
- 2013: Michel De Jaeghere [in French] (2013). Les dix commandements de la morale médiatique. Suresnes: Contretemps. ISBN 978-2-916951-14-0.

=== Editions ===
- 1997: Histoires de Londres. Paris: Sortilèges. 1997. pp. 334. ISBN 2-251-49118-X.
- 1999: Histoires de marins. Paris: Sortilèges. 1999. pp. 325. ISBN 2-251-49134-1.
