= 1962 French legislative election =

- 18 November and 25 November 1962

All 482 seats in the French National Assembly 242 seats needed for a majority
- Turnout: 68.7% (▼8.4 pp) (1st round); 72.1% (▲3.4 pp) (2nd round)
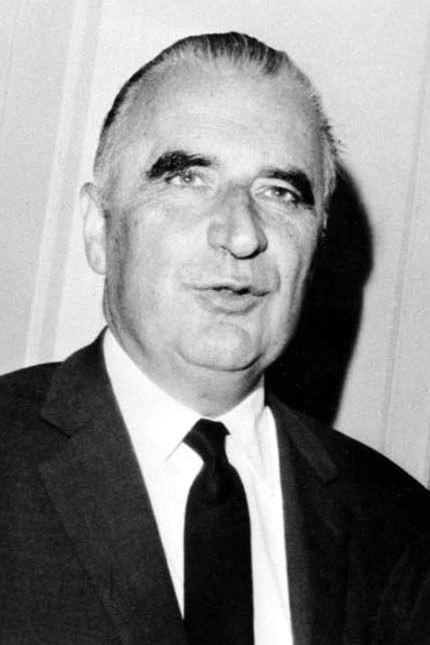

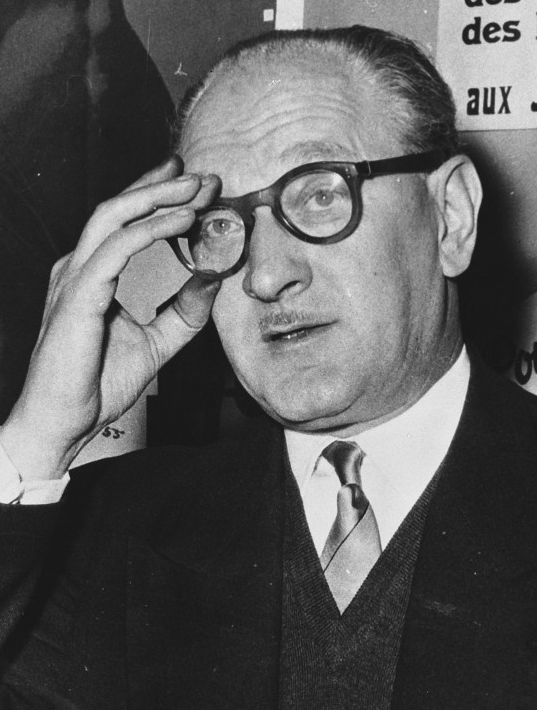

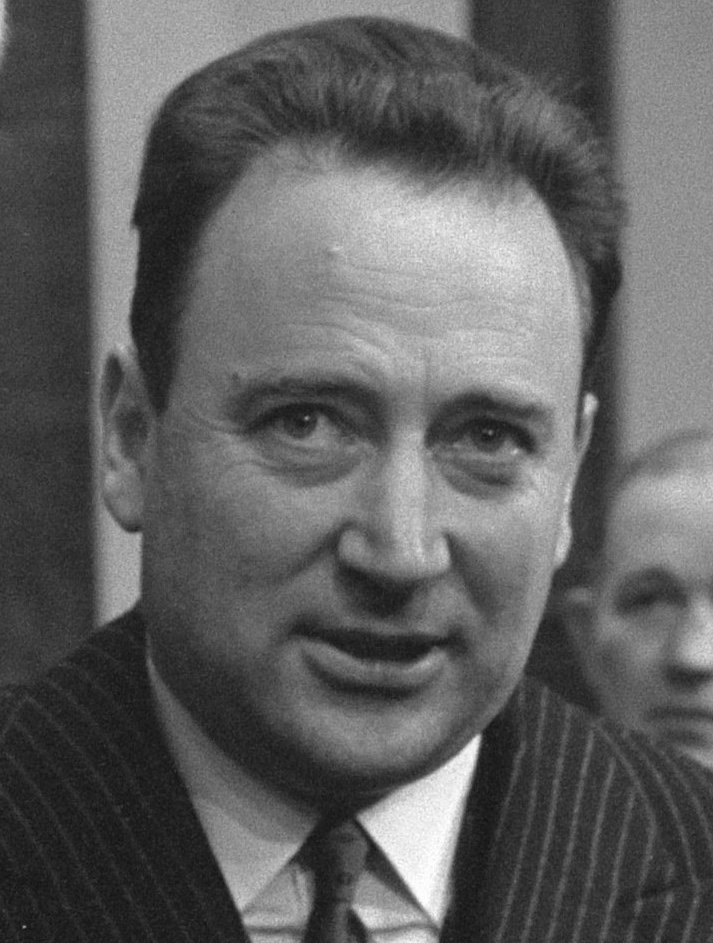

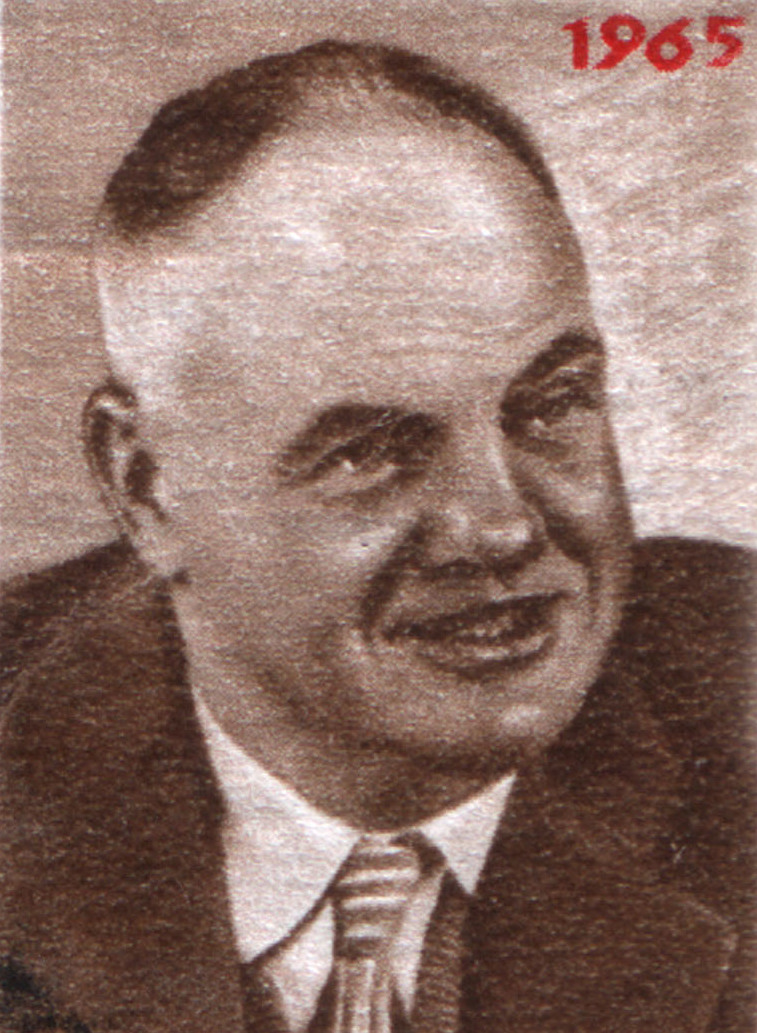

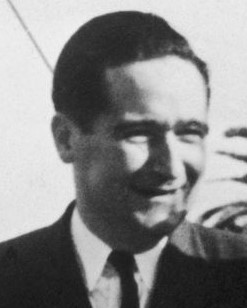

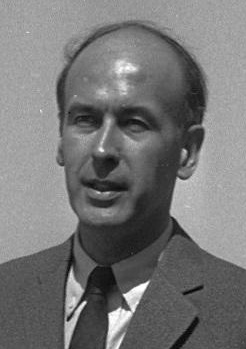
| | Majority party | Minority party | Third party |
|---|---|---|---|
| Leader | Georges Pompidou | Guy Mollet | Maurice Faure |
| Party | UNR | SFIO | PRV |
| Leader's seat | Cantal-2nd | Pas-de-Calais-1st | Lot |
| Last election | 189 seats, 17.6% | 40 seats, 15.5% | 37 seats, 13.2% |
| Seats won | 229 | 65 | 42 |
| Seat change | ▲40 | ▲25 | ▲5 |
| Popular vote | 5,855,744 (1st round); 6,169,890 (2nd round) | 2,298,729 (1st round); 2,264,011 (2nd round) | 1,429,649 (1st round); 1,172,711 (2nd round) |
| Percentage | 31.94% (1st round); 40.43% (2nd round) | 12.54% (1st round); 14.84% (2nd round) | 7.80% (1st round); 7.69% (2nd round) |
| | Fourth party | Fifth party | Sixth party |
| Leader | Maurice Thorez | André Colin | Camille Laurens |
| Party | PCF | MRP | CNIP |
| Leader's seat | Seine | Finistère (Senator) |
| Last election | 10 seats, 18.9% | 57 seats, 11.7% | 132 seats, 20.0% |
| Seats won | 41 | 36 | 28 |
| Seat change | ▲31 | ▼21 | ▼104 |
| Popular vote | 4,003,553 (1st round); 3,195,763 (2nd round) | 1,665,695 (1st round); 821,635 (2nd round) | 1,404,177 (1st round): (2nd round) |
| Percentage | 21.84% (1st round); 20.94% (2nd round) | 9.09% (1st round); 5.38% (2nd round) | 7.66% (1st round): (2nd round) |
| | Seventh party |
| Leader | Valéry Giscard d'Estaing |
| Party | RI |
| Leader's seat | Puy-de-Dôme |
| Last election | N/A (split from CNIP) |
| Seats won | 20 |
| Seat change | N/A |
| Popular vote | 1,089,348 (1st round); 1,444,666 (2nd round) |
| Percentage | 5.94% (1st round); 9.47% (2nd round) |
Prime Minister before election
Georges Pompidou
UNR
Elected Prime Minister
Georges Pompidou
UNR

Legislative elections were held in France on 18 November and 25 November 1962 to elect the second National Assembly of the Fifth Republic.

Since 1959 and the change of Algerian policy (Charles de Gaulle decided in favour of the "self-government" and "Algerian Algeria"), France had faced bomb attacks by the Secret Armed Organization (Organisation armée secrète or OAS) which opposed the independence of Algeria, negotiated by the FLN with the March 1962 Evian agreements and approved by referendum by the French people. This policy was disapproved by some members of the "Presidential Majority".

Simultaneously, when Georges Pompidou replaced Michel Debré as prime minister, the center-right parties (MRP and CNIP) left the majority due to de Gaulle's eurosceptic declaration. Like the Left, they denounced the presidentialization of the regime.

On 22 August de Gaulle escaped from an assassination attempt by the OAS in Le Petit-Clamart. He subsequently announced a controversial referendum in which he proposed the election of the president of the French Republic under universal suffrage. The presidential majority composed of the UNR and the Independent Republicans (RI) (which came from a CNIP split) campaigned for a "yes", while all the other parties formed a "coalition of no" and brought down Pompidou's cabinet by a vote of no confidence (motion de censure).

However, de Gaulle finally won the referendum and dissolved the National Assembly. During the legislative campaign, all the parties, except the UNR and the RI, criticized the "personal power" which they believed distorted France's Republican institutions. In the French political culture and in their mind, Republicanism was inseparable from parliamentary democracy and the reinforcement of the presidential powers was associated with Bonapartism. Contrary to the previous legislative election, the left-wing parties finalized an electoral agreement. The subsequent legislative elections saw advances for the left-wing opposition. However, conservative voters sanctioned the center-right parties, preferring to vote for the Gaullist party. Pompidou became Prime Minister again.

== Results ==
| Party | First round | | | Second round | | | Total seats |
| Party | Votes | % | Seats | Votes | % | Seats | Total seats |
|---|---|---|---|---|---|---|---|
| Union for the New Republic–Democratic Union of Labour | 5,855,744 | 31.94 | 46 | 6,169,890 | 40.43 | 183 | 229 |
| French Communist Party | 4,003,553 | 21.84 | 9 | 3,195,763 | 20.94 | 32 | 41 |
| French Section of the Workers' International | 2,298,729 | 12.54 | 1 | 2,264,011 | 14.84 | 64 | 65 |
| Popular Republican Movement | 1,665,695 | 9.09 | 14 | 821,635 | 5.38 | 22 | 36 |
| Radical Party & miscellaneous left | 1,429,649 | 7.80 | 8 | 1,172,711 | 7.69 | 34 | 42 |
| National Centre of Independents and Peasants | 1,404,177 | 7.66 | 6 | 1,444,666 | 9.47 | 22 | 28 |
| Independent Republicans | 1,089,348 | 5.94 | 12 | 1,444,666 | 9.47 | 8 | 20 |
| Unified Socialist Party & far-left | 427,467 | 2.33 | 0 | 138,131 | 0.91 | 2 | 2 |
| Far-right | 159,429 | 0.87 | 0 | 52,245 | 0.34 | 0 | 0 |
| Others | | | | | | | 2 |
| Total | 18,333,791 | 100.00 | 96 | 15,259,052 | 100.00 | 367 | 465 |
| Valid votes | 18,333,791 | 96.91 | | 15,259,052 | 96.11 | | |
| Invalid/blank votes | 584,368 | 3.09 | | 616,889 | 3.89 | | |
| Total votes | 18,918,159 | 100.00 | | 15,875,941 | 100.00 | | |
| Registered voters/turnout | 27,526,358 | 68.73 | | 21,957,468 | 72.30 | | |
Source: Quid

=== Parliamentary groups in the National Assembly ===
Graph of the party split among 482 seats.
| Party | Seats |
|---|---|
| UNR–UDT Group | 233 |
| Socialist Group | 66 |
| Democratic Centre Group | 55 |
| Communist Group | 41 |
| Democratic Rally Group | 39 |
| Independent Republicans Group | 35 |
| Non-Inscrits | 13 |
| Total | 482 |
Source: Quid
