= Les Amoureux de la France =

The Lovers of France Les Amoureux de la France
- Leader of DLF: Nicolas Dupont-Aignan
- Leader of the PCD: Jean-Frédéric Poisson
- Leader of the CNIP: Bruno North
- Founder: Nicolas Dupont-Aignan
- Founded: November 2018
- Merger of: CNIP, DLF, PCD
- Ideology: National conservatism Social conservatism
- Political position: Right-wing to far-right
- European affiliation: Alliance for Direct Democracy in Europe
- European Parliament group: Alliance for Direct Democracy in Europe
- Colors: Blue, White, Red (French Tricolore)
- Slogan: "Unissons-nous !" ("Let's Unite!")
- National Assembly: 1 / 577
- Senate: 0 / 348
- European Parliament: 2 / 74
- Presidency of Regional Councils: 0 / 17
- Presidency of Departmental Councils: 0 / 101

Website
- amoureuxdelafrance2019.fr

Les Amoureux de la France (lit. 'The Lovers of France') is a national-conservative political alliance launched in 2018 for the 2019 European Parliament election in France. The alliance contains the CNIP, the PCD and Nicolas Dupont-Aignan's party, Debout la France.
