= Philippe Verdier =

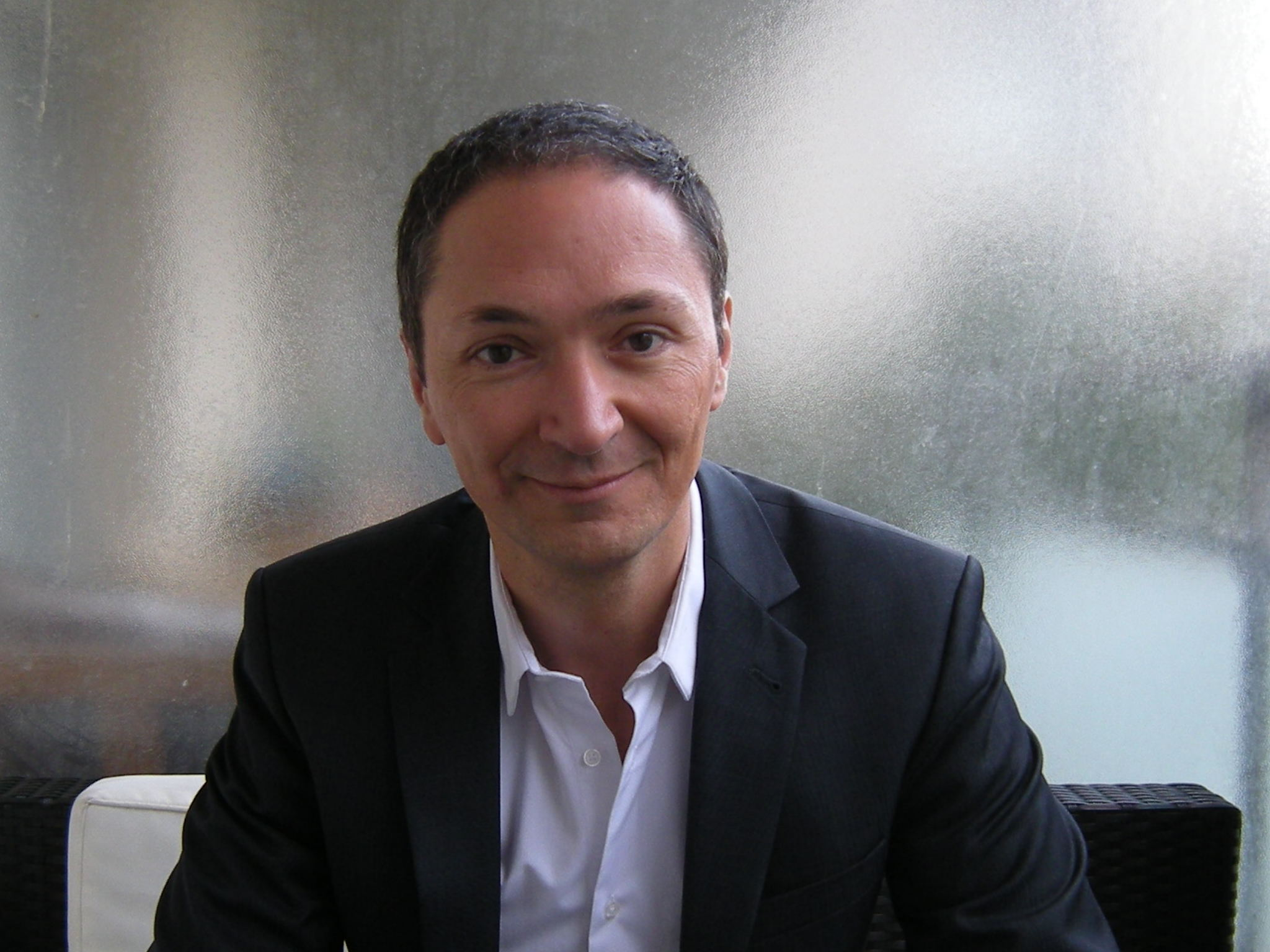
- Philippe Verdier in 2016
- Born: 1968 (age 57–58); Neuilly-sur-Seine, France
- Education: Paris Dauphine University
- Occupation: Weather presenter
- Spouse: Ludovic (m. 2013)

Philippe Verdier (born 23 May 1968) is a French radio and television weather presenter, and the author of Climat Investigation, a 2015 book critical of the politics of global warming.

== Early life and career ==
Verdier was born at Neuilly-sur-Seine, near Paris. At the age of fourteen he began to present a radio show.

In 1992 he began broadcasting on Radio France Internationale (RFI) and went on to be a shipping weather man on France 2. In 1995 he joined the new La Chaîne Météo, a 24-hour television weather channel, remaining until 2006.

In 2001, Verdier also worked for BFM Radio and Radio Monte Carlo, both part of the NextRadioTV group, as presenter of Weather bulletins. In 2005, he replaced Laurent Cabrol on Europe 1. In 2007, he joined BFM TV, as a morning weather presenter. In June 2011, he moved on to the weather service of France 2. In 2012, Verdier became director of the weather service of France 2. In January 2014, he launched a new television weather format with Florence Klein, continuing with it until 2015. By this point, he was France's leading weather man on television, and a household name.

In 2009, Verdier obtained a master's degree in sustainable development at Paris Dauphine University, where his dissertation was on climate change and the media.

Verdier reported from the United Nations Framework Convention on Climate Change conferences of Bali (2007), Copenhagen (2009), and Cancún (2010), and was expected to cover the Paris conference of 2015 for France 2.

== Book Climat Investigation ==
In October 2015, Verdier sensationally published a book titled Climat Investigation, questioning links between scientists, politicians, lobbyists, and environmental NGOs. He also addressed an open letter to the President of France, François Hollande, denouncing the forthcoming COP21 conference, due to begin a month later.

In the book, Verdier states that leading climatologists and politicians have “taken the world hostage” with misleading information. In promoting the book, he said

”Every night I address five million French people to talk to you about the wind, the clouds and the sun. And yet there is something important, very important, that I haven’t been able to tell you, because it’s neither the time nor the place to do so. We are hostage to a planetary scandal over climate change – a war machine whose aim is to keep us in fear.”

The book led France 2 to take Verdier off the air within a few days, sending him on a “forced holiday”. He commented “This is a direct extension of what I say in my book, namely that any contrary views must be eliminated.” In November, he was dismissed by Delphine Ernotte, the chief executive of France Télévisions. In a statement, the state broadcasting company said "Our rules... prevent anyone from using their professional status... to push forward their personal opinions.”

== Later life ==
In November and December 2015, Verdier covered the 2015 United Nations Climate Change Conference in Paris for Russia Today.

In 2016, he founded Force 8, a consultancy firm advising on management and communication, and in October of that year joined Sud Radio to present Grand Matin Week-end on Saturdays and Sundays. The same year, his second book was published, Les Cieux sont tombés sur la tête (“The Skies Have Fallen on Our Heads”).

In 2018, Verdier moved on from Sud Radio to Radio Lac, and in 2019 became its editor-in-chief.

== Personal life ==
On 30 August 2013, Verdier entered into a same-sex marriage with Ludovic, with whom he had lived since 2007.

== Selected publications ==
- Climat Investigation (Éditions Ring, 2015) ISBN 979-1091447362
- Les Cieux sont tombés sur la tête (Mazarine, 2016) ISBN 978-2863743577
- Climat Investigation (La mécanique générale, 2016) ISBN 979-1095776062
