= Laurent Obertone =

French writer and journalist (born 1984)

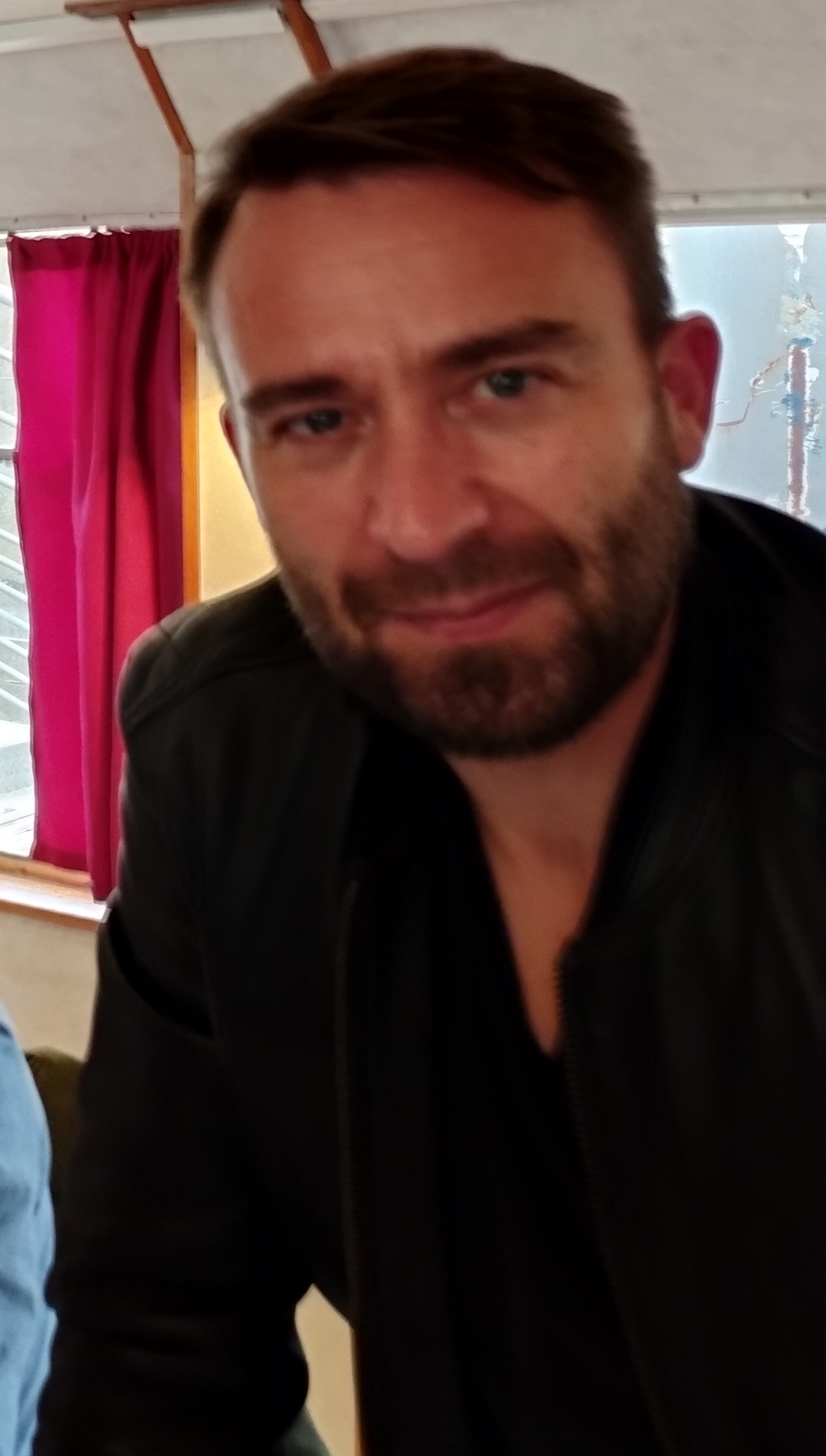
Obertone in 2023

Laurent Obertone (French pronunciation: [lɔʁɑ̃ ɔbɛʁtɔn]; born 10 April 1984) is a French writer and journalist. He has written a series of polemical books which some French media describe as reactionary. His first book, La France Orange mécanique, became a bestseller in 2013. He is known for his novel trilogy Guérilla (2016–2022), which is about civil war in France.

== Life and work ==
The name Laurent Obertone is a pseudonym which the author began to use in 2010 when he wrote for the online magazine Ring. The same year, the novelist Michel Houellebecq created media reactions by bringing Obertone to a dinner with President Nicolas Sarkozy at the Élysée Palace, following Houellebecq's Prix Goncourt win for The Map and the Territory. Obertone received more attention in 2013 when his own book La France Orange mécanique (transl. The Clockwork Orange France) became a bestseller. The book is about increasing violence in France, which Obertone links to immigration and calls "the wildening" (French: l'ensauvagement) of the country. It was followed by several polemical books, including 2015's La France Big Brother (transl. The Big Brother France), a critical analysis of how France is ruled which L'Express described as "reactionary" and "sexist".

Obertone's writings have made an impact on France's far right, mainstream right, and a few government ministers in the cabinets of Édouard Philippe and Jean Castex.

Obertone has written a trilogy of novels called Guérilla (2016–2022), which is about how civil war breaks out in France, spurred on by social media and mainstream journalists. The novels became bestsellers.

Together with Papacito, Marsault and Laura Magné, he co-founded the quarterly satire magazine La Furia. The first issue was published in January 2022 and sold 60,000 copies.

== Publications ==
=== Non-fiction ===
- La France Orange mécanique, Paris, Éditions Ring, 2013, ISBN 979-10-91447-03-4
- Utøya, Paris, Éditions Ring, 2013, ISBN 978-1-09-144708-0
- La France Big Brother, Paris, Éditions Ring, 2015, ISBN 979-10-95776-01-7
- Le Diable du ciel, Paris, Éditions Ring, 2017, ISBN 979-10-91447-68-3
- La France interdite, Paris, Éditions Ring, 2018, ISBN 9791091447812
- Éloge de la force : Renverser l'histoire, Paris, Éditions Ring, 2020
- Game Over: La révolution antipolitique, Paris, Éditions Magnus, 2022, ISBN 978-2-38422-000-7

=== Novels ===
- Guérilla, Paris, Éditions Ring, 2016, ISBN 979-10-91447-49-2
- Guérilla : Le temps des barbares, Paris, Éditions Ring, 2019
- Guérilla : le dernier combat, Éditions Magnus, 2022, ISBN 978-2384220083
