= Valmonde =

French publishing company

- Parent company: Sud Communication
- Founded: 1966
- Founder: Raymond Bourgine
- Country of origin: France
- Headquarters location: Paris
- Publication types: Magazines
- Official website: www.valmonderegie.fr

Valmonde is a French publisher of magazines. Its main publications are Valeurs Actuelles and Jours de Chasse.

== Overview ==
It was founded in 1966 by Raymond Bourgine. In the 1960s, Bourgine funded the Federation of Nationalist Students (FEN) in exchange for their members to sell copies of Le Spectacle du Monde. The editor of the FEN's publication, Les Cahiers universitaires, was François d'Orcival, former editor in chef of the French weekly magazineValeurs Actuelles.

It was incorporated in 1997 and became a subsidiary of Sud Communication in 2006. It is headquartered in Paris. Valmonde was acquired in 2015 by Privinvest Medias.

The Valmonde Group has been publishing the Marine & Océans magazine since 2016.

In 2019, Valmonde revived the monthly magazine Le Spectacle du Monde with essays by Joseph Nye, Robert Kagan and Michel Houellebecq in the first issue.
