= Raymond Bourgine =

French journalist and politician

Senator for Paris
- In office 25 September 1977 – 29 November 1990
- Prime Minister: Raymond Barre; Pierre Mauroy; Laurent Fabius; Jacques Chirac; Michel Rocard

Personal details
- Born: 9 March 1925 Diégo-Suarez, Madagascar, France
- Died: 29 November 1990 (aged 65) Paris, France
- Resting place: Passy Cemetery, Passy, Paris
- Party: CNIP; Rally for the Republic
- Occupation: Journalist; Politician

Raymond Bourgine ((French pronunciation: [ʁɛmɔ̃ buʁʒin])9 March 1925 – 29 November 1990) was a French journalist and politician. He served as editor-in-chief of Valeurs Actuelles from 1966 to 1990 and as French Senator from 1977 to 1990.

== Early life ==
Raymond Bourgine was born on March 9, 1925, in Diégo-Suarez, Madagascar. He grew up in the Réunion and Madagascar, and joined the French Army in Africa during the Second World War.

== Journalism ==
In 1945, Bourgine started writing for Paris-Matin, followed by La Vie française in 1946 and Aux Écoutes de la Finance in 1947, before becoming its editor-in-chief in 1948. In 1957, he bought Aux Écoutes de la Finance, then known as Finance, from Paul Lévy'. In 1962, he launched the luxury magazine Le Spectacle du Monde. In 1966, he founded the publisher Valmonde. The same year, he renamed Finance Valeurs actuelles. In 1967, he founded Le Nouveau Journal, and led the Financial and Economics Agency from 1967 to 1970. He served as editor-in-chief of Valeurs actuelles until his death, when his protege François d'Orcival took over.

== Politics ==
A proponent of French Algeria, Bourgine supported Jean-Louis Tixier-Vignancour in 1965. He supported Georges Pompidou for president in 1969. Close to Antoine Pinay, he joined the Centre national des indépendants et paysans (CNIP) in 1971. From 1977 to 1983, he served as member of the Council of Paris for the Rassemblement pour la République and advisor to the Mayor of Paris, Jacques Chirac. He was elected to the French Senate in 1977, and again in 1986 under the leadership of Maurice Couve de Murville. In 1987, he joined the senatorial organization for France-South African relations. He was also a fierce champion of capitalism and free enterprise and, like his avatar Alexis de Tocqueville, he supported the freedom of the press. He rejected the 1981 nationalisation legislations, and in 1985 he rejected government funding of the press. He sat on the Board of Trustees of the Centre Georges-Pompidou.

== Death ==
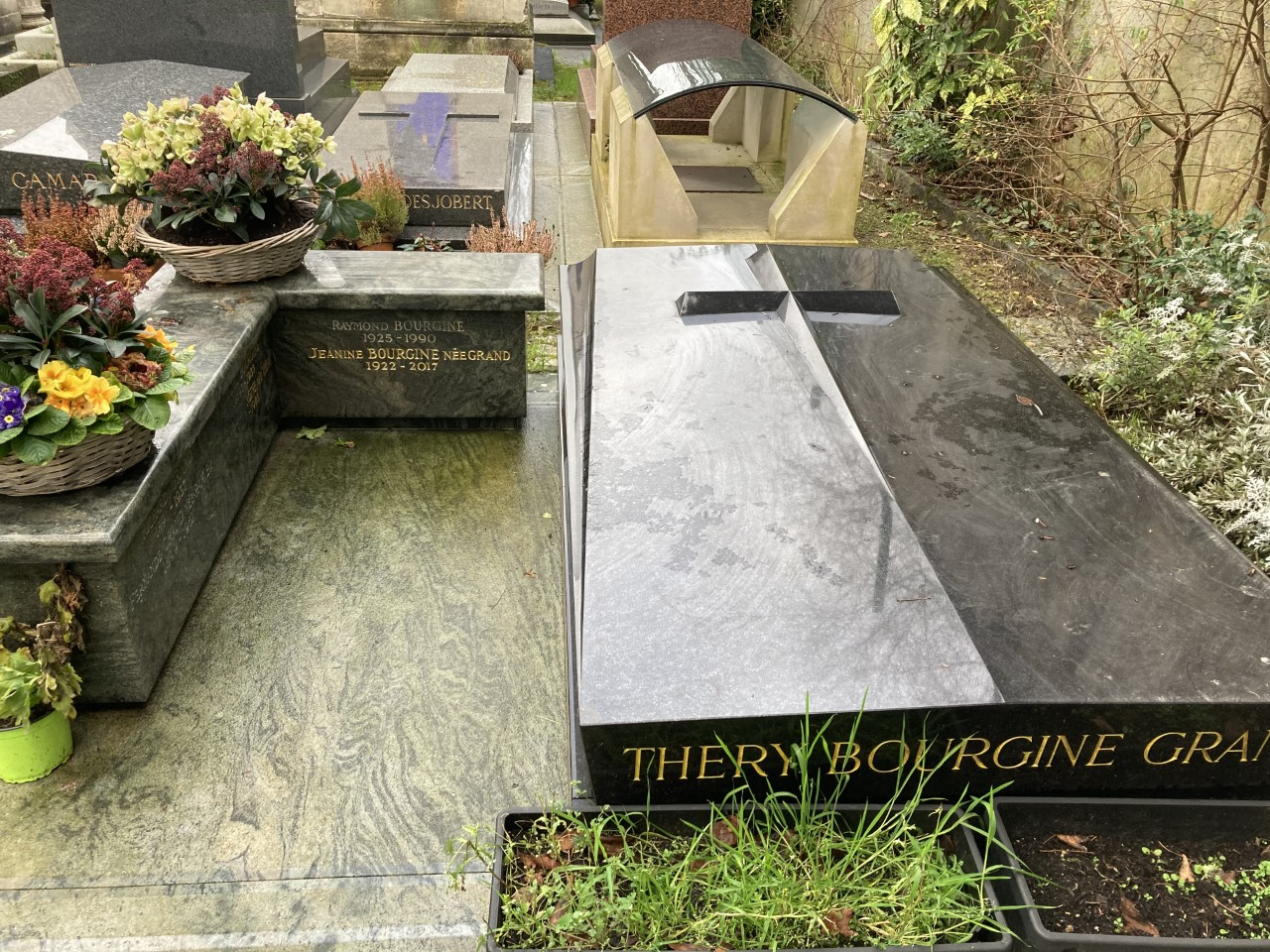
Grave.

Bourgine died on November 29, 1990, in Paris. He is buried in Passy Cemetery.
