= Farmers' Party for Social Union =

Farmers' Party for Social Union Parti paysan d'union sociale
- Abbreviation: PPUS
- Leader: Paul Antier
- Founded: July 11, 1945
- Dissolved: March 12, 1967
- Preceded by: French Agrarian and Peasant Party
- Succeeded by: National Centre of Independents and Peasants (CNIP)
- Ideology: Agrarianism; Conservatism
- Political position: Right to Far-right
- Colors

The Farmers' Party for Social Union (Parti paysan d'union sociale, PPUS) was founded on 11 July 1945 by Paul Antier under the name Farmers' Party to represent agricultural interests and succeed the pre-war French Agrarian and Peasant Party. Camille Laurens, former deputy syndic of the Peasant Corporation, became one of its leaders. On 6 October 1945, the party launched its weekly publication, L'Unité paysanne.

== History ==
=== Origins ===
The PPUS aimed to represent peasant corporatism and respond to the decline of the Radical Party, the discrediting of the Peasant Corporation, and the distrust of the General Confederation of Agriculture. The party promoted "social union" rather than opposition between urban and rural interests, advocating for the renovation of socio-economic structures based on agriculture.

During the 1945 elections, the party allied itself with the political right, opposing ongoing transformations but achieving limited national presence. Following the elections, eleven MPs, including five affiliates, formed the Peasant Group, aligned with the Democratic and Socialist Union of the Resistance. Some members later joined the Republican Party of Liberty.

The PPUS described the election results as a victory of workers and the bourgeoisie over peasants. By 1948–1949, the party began advocating for amnesty regarding actions during the Occupation and Liberation.

=== Transformation ===
At its National Council in July 1946, the party rebranded itself as the Farmers' Party for Social Union (PPUS) to reflect its broader focus on artisans, workers, and the middle class. The party opposed the Tripartite coalition and called for the abolition of the Ministry of Supply.

After the November 1946 French legislative election, the PPUS won nine seats in the National Assembly and seven in the Council of the Republic. By March 1947, the group renamed itself the Republican Centre for Peasant and Social Union and strongly opposed the introduction of Social Security.

Amid the Cold War, the PPUS adopted a strong anti-communist stance. The party showed strength in rural areas like Haute-Loire and Cantal, securing 16 senators in the 1948 Senate elections. The party drew support from the FNSEA and rural Catholic regions.

=== Merger with Independents ===
On 15 February 1951, the PPUS merged into the National Centre of Independents (CNIP), which subsequently became the National Centre of Independents and Peasants.

In 1957, party leader Paul Antier was expelled from the CNIP after forming an alliance with Pierre Poujade's Union et Fraternité Française. Antier retained control of the PPUS, while members loyal to the CNIP formed the Peasant and Social Union Movement (MUPS). The PPUS then joined the far-right Peasant Rally (RP) in September 1957.

The party officially adopted the name Democratic and Peasant Movement (MDP) on 16 September 1965, with Antier remaining as president. Initially a candidate for the 1965 French presidential election, Antier withdrew in favor of Jean Lecanuet on 17 November. By the 1967 legislative elections, the party dissolved as Antier joined the Democratic and Republican Centre.
