= Le Spectacle du Monde =

Monthly French magazine

- Categories: Political and cultural magazine
- Frequency: Monthly
- Founder: Raymond Bourgine
- Founded: 1962
- Company: Valmonde
- Country: France
- Based in: Paris
- Language: French
- ISSN: 0038-6944

Le Spectacle du Monde (French pronunciation: [lə spɛktakl dy mɔ̃d]) is a French language magazine published in France. Although it was closed in 2014, the magazine was restarted in 2019.

== Overview ==
Le Spectacle du Monde was launched by Raymond Bourgine in 1962. The magazine was published on a monthly basis. It billed itself as political, geopolitical and cultural news publication. It was most recently owned by Valmonde which closed it in 2014. The last issue was published in July-August 2014. Valmonde relaunched the publication on 31 January 2019.
