= Éditions Ring =

French publishing company

Ring
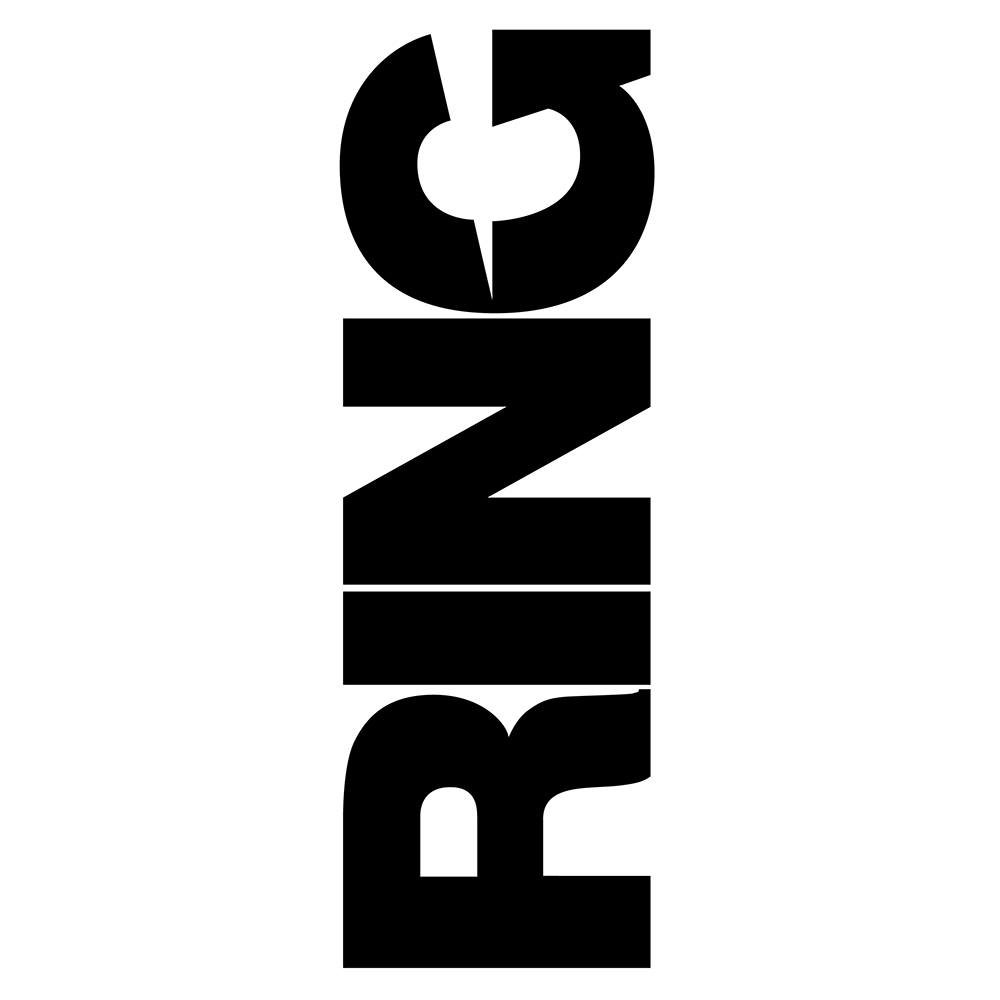
- Traded as: Société par actions simplifiée
- Founded: 2012
- Founder: David Kersan (a.k.a. David Serra)
- Country of origin: France
- Headquarters location: 10 rue de l'Arbalète; 75005 Paris
- Publication types: Documents, Ring Blanche, Ring Noir, Murder Ballads
- Official website: Official website

Ring is a French publishing company founded in 2012 by David Kersan, also known as David Serra. It publishes thrillers, novels, non-fiction and comics. It is considered to a have far-right political position and publishes material from controversial authors.

== History ==
Ring was established in 2012 in the same vein as the magazine Sur le ring.

Authors published by Ring include Stéphane Bourgoin, Joël Houssin, Laurent Obertone, Zineb El Rhazoui, Frédérique Lantieri, Dominique Rizet, Philippe Verdier, Ghislain Gilberti, Norman Mailer, Jocko Willink and Marsault.

In January 2016, Ring started a pocket-side collection called La mécanique générale, where successful titles are reprinted after two years. In 2019, the stand of Ring at the Brussels Book Fair was vandalised.

Ring had a 785 000-euro revenue and a 130 000-euro benefit by late 2013, which Les Inrockuptibles stated was

an impressive number given the small catalogue — around 40 books — and small team

In 2014, revenue fell below 250 000 euros.

Xavier Raufer has been involved with Ring.

=== Collections ===
- La Mécanique Générale (LMG) :
  - LMG Documents : news, social reporting, personal accounts and non-fiction
  - LMG Thrillers : fictions, thrillers
- Ring Blanche : general literature
- Ring Noir : thrillers, police drama
- Murder Ballads : documents and true crimes

== Editorial stance ==
Scholar Pascal Durand has qualified Ring as being typical of a "neo-reactionnary" posture. Libération sees Ring as a component of the Far Right, and has criticised its promotion of texts is deems to be xenophobic (La France Orange mécanique by Laurent Obertone, a compilation of crimes partially attributed to children of immigrants; Une élection ordinaire by journalist Geoffroy Lejeune, a fictional account of the election of Éric Zemmour for President of the French Republic); of climato-sceptics (such as a book by former meteo journalist Philippe Verdier).

J.-L. Hippolyte, from Rutgers University-Camden, quotes a short portrait of Maurice G. Dantec, one of the star authors of Ring, by founder Serra, as being a "Christian Zionist, pro-American, anti-laic, counter-Revolutionary militant.

A reporting on "the Far-Right attack on publishing", Ellen Salvi, a Mediapart journalist, states that in 2016,

within four years, it had settled in the media landscape by publishing fiction and non-fiction that was deliberately inflammatory, promoted by anxiogen advertising as well as by an aggressive usage of social media.

David Serra has rejected the "Far-Right" qualification, stating that he "cares little for politics" and that "it is not because [he had] published a couple of Right-Wing authors [that he shared their opinions]. Les Inrockuptibles underlined that

the magazine Sur le ring, founded by the very same Serra, has nevertheless been quite politically oriented, as its motto states: it is about ‘‘bombing that dirty humanist atmosphere’’. "Ennemies" are angrily listed: ‘‘Altermondialists, rappers, feminists, antiracists, bobos’’…
