= Denis Masséglia =

French politician

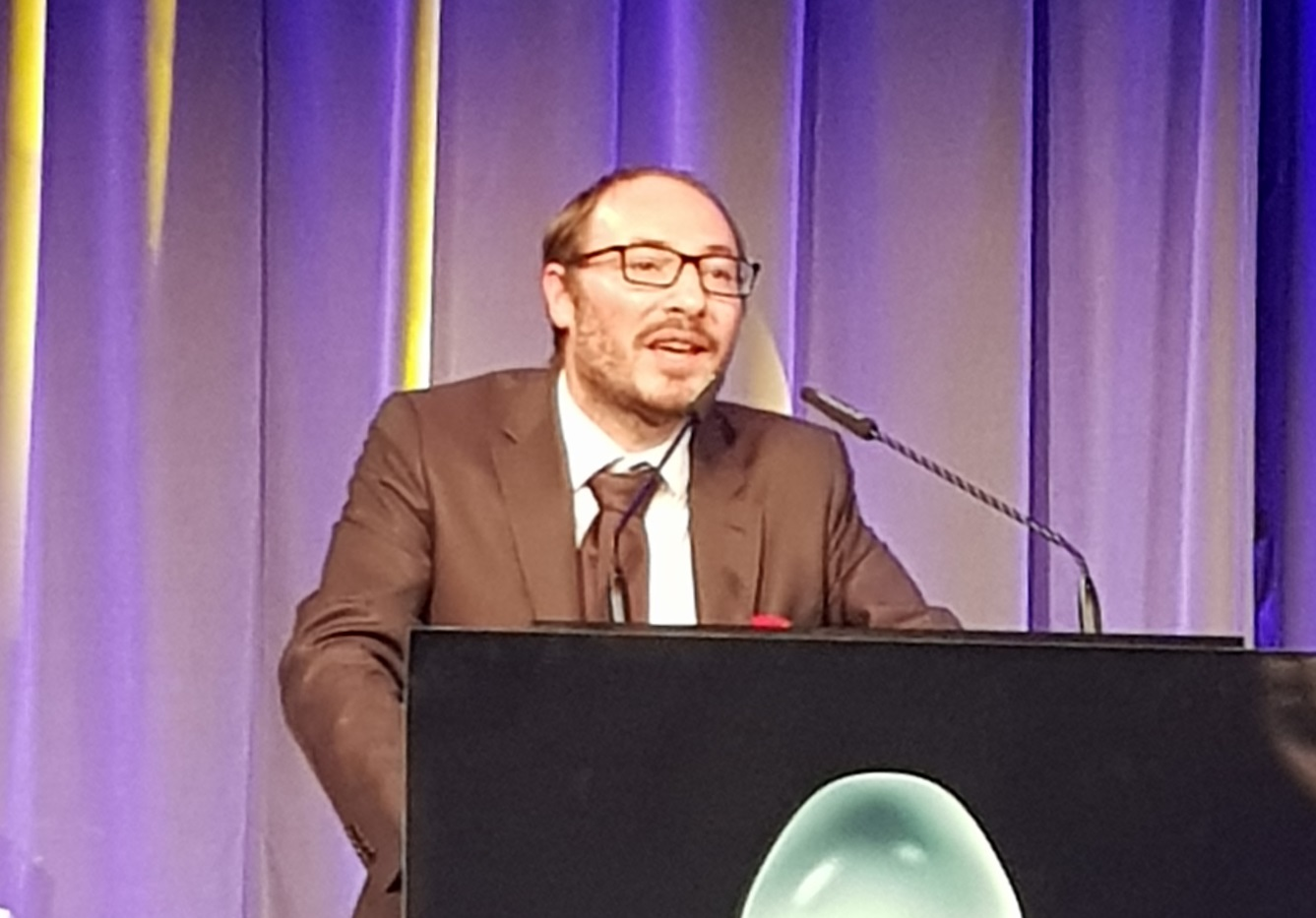

Member of the National Assembly for Maine-et-Loire's 5th constituency
- Incumbent
- Assumed office 21 June 2017
- Preceded by: Gilles Bourdouleix

Personal details
- Born: 11 April 1981 (age 45) Nice, France
- Party: En Marche!
- Education: Institut catholique d'arts et métiers

Denis Masséglia (born 11 April 1981) is a French politician of La République En Marche! (LREM) who has been serving as a member of the French National Assembly since the 2017 elections, representing the department of Maine-et-Loire.

== Political career ==
In parliament, Masséglia serves as member of the Committee on Foreign Affairs. In addition to his committee assignments, he is part of the parliamentary friendship groups with the United States, Japan and South Korea.

In 2017, Masséglia launched a parliamentary study group on video games.

In 2023, Masséglia pushed for an provision in a bill that all town halls must display a presidential portrait.

== Political positions ==
In July 2019, Masséglia voted in favor of the French ratification of the European Union’s Comprehensive Economic and Trade Agreement (CETA) with Canada.

== See also ==
- 2017 French legislative election
