= Camille Laurens (politician) =

French politician (1906–1979)

Member of the French National Assembly
- In office 6 November 1945 – 5 December 1958
- Constituency: Cantal

Minister of Agriculture
- In office 11 August 1951 – 28 June 1953
- President: Vincent Auriol
- Prime Minister: René Pleven (2nd), Edgar Faure (1st), Antoine Pinay, René Mayer

Personal details
- Born: 12 August 1906 Lacroix-Barrez, Aveyron, France
- Died: 15 November 1979 (aged 73) Paris 15th, France
- Party: Farmers' Party for Social Union (PPUS); National Centre of Independents and Peasants (CNIP); Social Action Independents and Peasants (IPAS)

Camille Laurens (12 August 1906 – 15 November 1979) was a French politician who served as a deputy for the department of Cantal and as Minister of Agriculture during the French Fourth Republic.

== Biography ==
Laurens began his political career as a deputy for Cantal, participating in both the 1946 Constituent Assembly (though initially invalidated in the first) and serving in the French National Assembly from 1946 to 1958. He represented the Farmers' Party for Social Union (PPUS) and later aligned with the National Centre of Independents and Peasants (CNIP).

Between 1951 and 1953, Laurens held various government positions, including Minister of Agriculture and Secretary of State for Agriculture, across five governments during the presidency of Vincent Auriol.

== Governmental Roles ==
- Secretary of State for Agriculture – René Pleven (2nd government) (11 August – 21 November 1951)
- Minister of Agriculture – René Pleven (2nd government) (21 November 1951 – 20 January 1952)
- Minister of Agriculture – Edgar Faure (1st government) (20 January – 8 March 1952)
- Minister of Agriculture – Antoine Pinay (8 March 1952 – 8 January 1953)
- Minister of Agriculture – René Mayer (8 January – 28 June 1953)

== Decorations ==
Camille Laurens received several national and international honors, including:

- Ordre de la Francisque
- Knight of the Legion of Honour
- Commander of the Order of Agricultural Merit
- War Cross (Croix du combattant)
- Commander pro Merito Melitensi (Sovereign Military Order of Malta)
- Commander of the Order of Leopold (Belgium)
- Norwegian Medal of Honour
