= Geoffroy Lejeune =

French journalist (born 1988)

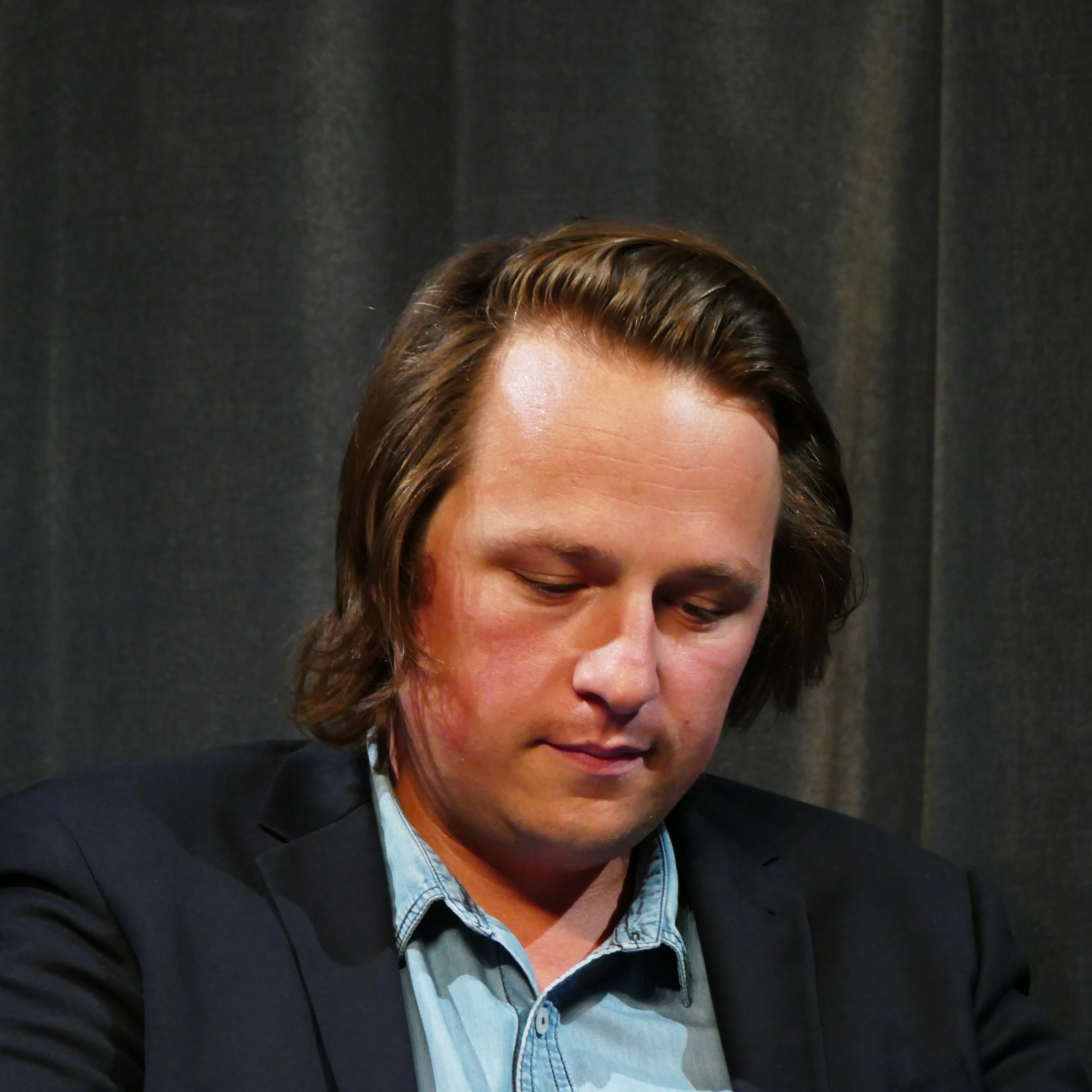
- Born: 3 September 1988 (age 37); Avignon, France
- Education: Aix-Marseille University; École supérieure de journalisme de Paris
- Occupation: Editor-in-chief of Le Journal du Dimanche

Geoffroy Lejeune (born 3 September 1988) is a French journalist. He was the editor-in-chief of Valeurs actuelles which is associated with the far right. In August 2023, he was made editor-in-chief of Le Journal du Dimanche.

== Early life ==
Geoffroy Lejeune was born on 3 September 1988. He graduated from the École supérieure de journalisme de Paris in 2011.

== Career ==
=== Early career ===
Lejeune began his career in journalism for the french weekly magazine Le Point.

=== Valeurs actuelles ===
He became the political editor of Valeurs actuelles in 2015 and its editor-in-chief in 2016. He became the youngest editor-in-chief in France. As editor, he covered the whole spectrum of right-wing politics, from the far right to the centre right. He also hired several young journalists, with a focus on investigative journalism. In April 2017, he derided Le Monde, France's left-wing newspaper of record, for launching Decodex, a fact-checking app, and he suggested Valeurs actuelles should start fact-checking Le Monde.

In September 2021, he was fined €1500 after Valeurs actuelles was found guilty of hate speech for publishing a seven page fictional story about La France Insoumise politician Danièle Obono in which the magazine depicted Obono as being captured and enslaved in the 18th century.

In June 2023, he was fired from his position at Valeurs actuelles after a conflict with Iskandar Safa, the owner of the magazine, in which Safa accused Lejeune of being politically too far to the right. Over the course of his tenure as editor-in-chief, the number of subscribers to the magazine declined by 10% and the number of visitors to its website decline by half.

=== Le Journal du Dimanche ===
In 2023, media group Vivendi, mainly owned by billionaire Vincent Bolloré, announced that it would be acquiring the weekly newspaper Le Journal du Dimanche and appointing Lejeune as its new editor-in-chief. The appointment proved controversial, with over 400 prominent cultural and political figures signing an open letter opposing his appointment and saying that "the first time since the Liberation of France, a large national media will be run by a far-right personality." Human rights group Reporters Without Borders stated that the appointment would "threaten editorial independence in journalism." In response to Lejeune's appointment, the staff of Le Journal du Dimanche launched a strike, leading to the newspaper missing publication two consecutive weeks for the first time in its history.

=== Books ===
Lejeune is the author of a political novel (Une élection ordinaire), published in 2015, in which conservative essayist Éric Zemmour is elected as the President of France.

== Political positions ==
Lejeune endorsed Éric Zemmour in the 2022 French presidential election. Politico has described him as a "proud friend" of far-right politician Marion Maréchal. He has been described by France24 as "the pen and sword of the far-right" and by Le Monde as a "reactionary crusader."

== Works ==
- Lejeune, Geoffroy (2015). Une élection ordinaire. Paris: Éditions Ring. ISBN 9791091447355. OCLC 930931743.
