= Paul Antier =

French politician (1905–1996)

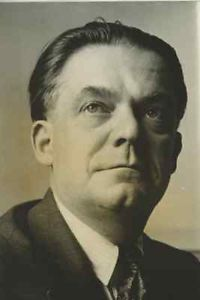

Member of the National Assembly (France)
- In office November 6, 1945 – December 5, 1958
- Constituency: Haute-Loire

Minister of Agriculture (France)
- In office August 11, 1951 – November 21, 1951
- President: Vincent Auriol

Minister of Merchant Marine (France)
- In office February 23, 1955 – February 1, 1956
- President: René Coty

Personal details
- Born: Paul Alphonse Antier; May 20, 1905 Le Puy-en-Velay, France
- Died: October 23, 1996 (aged 91) Antibes, France
- Party: Parti Paysan d'Union Sociale
- Occupation: Politician

Paul Antier (20 May 1905 – 23 October 1996) was a French politician and lawyer who served as a key advocate for agrarian interests in France. He was a member of the National Assembly (France) for Haute-Loire and held ministerial positions under the Fourth Republic.

== Early life and career ==
Paul Antier was born in Le Puy-en-Velay, Haute-Loire, the son of Joseph Antier, a lawyer and politician. He followed in his father's footsteps, studying law and showing an early interest in agricultural issues. In 1931, at the age of 26, he began his political career as the mayor of Laussonne, a village in Haute-Loire.

== Political career ==
Antier entered national politics in 1936 when he was elected as a deputy for Haute-Loire in the Third Republic. He joined the Agrarian and Peasant Party and quickly became known for his advocacy on behalf of small farmers, particularly opposing modernization policies that threatened rural traditions.

During the Second World War, Antier became an active member of the French Resistance. His opposition to the Vichy regime led to his removal from office and a death sentence in absentia. After the Liberation, he returned to politics as a leader of the Parti Paysan, serving in the Constituent Assembly and later as a member of the National Assembly under the Fourth Republic.

== Ministerial roles ==
Paul Antier held multiple ministerial positions, including:

- Minister of Agriculture (1951)
- Minister of the Merchant Marine (1955–1956)

In these roles, Antier worked to balance the demands of modernization with the preservation of small family farms. He advocated for fair pricing and subsidies to support farmers against the pressures of industrialization and European market integration.

== See also ==
- Agrarianism
