= Gilles-William Goldnadel =

French-Israeli writer

- Born: 12 January 1954 (age 72); Rouen, France
- Education: Lycée des Bruyères; Paris 1 Panthéon-Sorbonne University
- Occupation: Lawyer • Columnist • Author
- Spouse: Béatrice Vonderweit
- Children: 1 son, 1 daughter
- Parent(s): Henri Goldnadel; Victoria Schwartz

Gilles-William Goldnadel (born 1954) is a French-Israeli lawyer, author and columnist.

== Early life ==
Gilles-William Goldnadel was born on 12 January 1954 in Rouen, in northern France. He is a secular Ashkenazi Jew. His father. Henri Goldnadel, was of Polish Jewish descent, while his mother, Victoria Schwartz, is of Lithuanian Jew descent.

Goldnadel grew up in Gournay-en-Bray, where they owned a clothing store. He was educated at the Lycée des Bruyères in Rouen. He received a master's degree in Law from Panthéon-Sorbonne University.

== Career ==
Goldnadel is a lawyer. He has defended Israeli businessman Arcadi Gaydamak and Italian journalist Oriana Fallaci, among many others. In 1996, he defended Maurice Arreckx. In 2014, he defended Patrick Buisson, former President Nicolas Sarkozy's advisor. In 2015, he defended Florian Philippot, a French politician, against the absolute monarchy of Qatar.

An author, Goldnadel has written eight books, three of which with Jean-Claude Gawsewitch. In 2011, he wrote the preface of Vendée : du génocide au mémoricide by Reynald Secher, suggesting the War in the Vendée led to a genocide. He is also a columnist, writing for Le Figaro and Valeurs Actuelles, two conservative French publications. He protects freedom of speech in French media. In a March 2015 column in Le Figaro, he suggested antisemitism and islamophobia were not comparable.

== Philanthropy ==
Goldnadel first visited Israel in 1971. He serves as the President of the Association France-Israël. He has served on the Steering Committee of the Conseil Représentatif des Institutions juives de France (Representative Council of French Jewish Institutions) since 2010. He is a zionist, and has as his "personal friend" Israeli Prime Minister Benjamin Netanyahu. He is a member of The Republicans.

== Personal life ==
Goldnadel became an Israeli citizen in 2000. He is married to Béatrice Vonderweidt, a former model, now a painter whose work was exhibited at the French Institute of Tel Aviv in 2008. She is a gentile. They reside in Neuilly-sur-Seine, near Paris. They have a son, Benjamin, and a daughter, Laura-Sarah, both of whom are Israeli citizens and residents.

In July 2025, Gilles-William Goldnadel was convicted at first instance of defaming Muzna Shihabi. At the end of October 2026, Goldnadel withdrew his appeal, making the conviction final. This is Goldnadel’s second conviction for defamation, following his conviction in 2009 for defaming Mouloud Aounit, when the Court of Appeal ordered him to pay a fine of €8,000.

== Bibliography ==
- Une idée certaine de la France (Paris: France-Empire, 1998).
- Le Nouveau Bréviaire de la haine (Paris: Ramsay, 2001).
- Les Martyrocrates (Paris: Plon, 2004).
- Conversation sur les sujets qui fâchent avec Alexandre Adler (with Jean-Claude Gawsewitch, 2008).
- Le Blognadel (Paris: Éditions de Passy, 2009).
- Sans concessions. Conversations avec David Reinharc, avec Pascal Boniface (Paris: Éditions David Reinharc, 2010).
- Réflexions sur la question blanche (with Jean-Claude Gawsewitch, 2011).
- Le vieil homme m'indigne ! (with Jean-Claude Gawsewitch, 2012).
- Névroses médiatiques. Ou comment le monde est devenu une foule déchaînée, 2018, Plon.
- Manuel de résistance au fascisme d'extrême-gauche, 2021, Nouvelles Éditions De Passy.
- Journal de guerre, C'est l'Occident qu'on assassine, 2024, Fayard.
- Journal d'un prisonnier, 2025, Fayard.
- Vol au-dessus d'un nid de cocus, 2025, Fayard.
