= Philippe Malaud =

French politician (1925–2007)

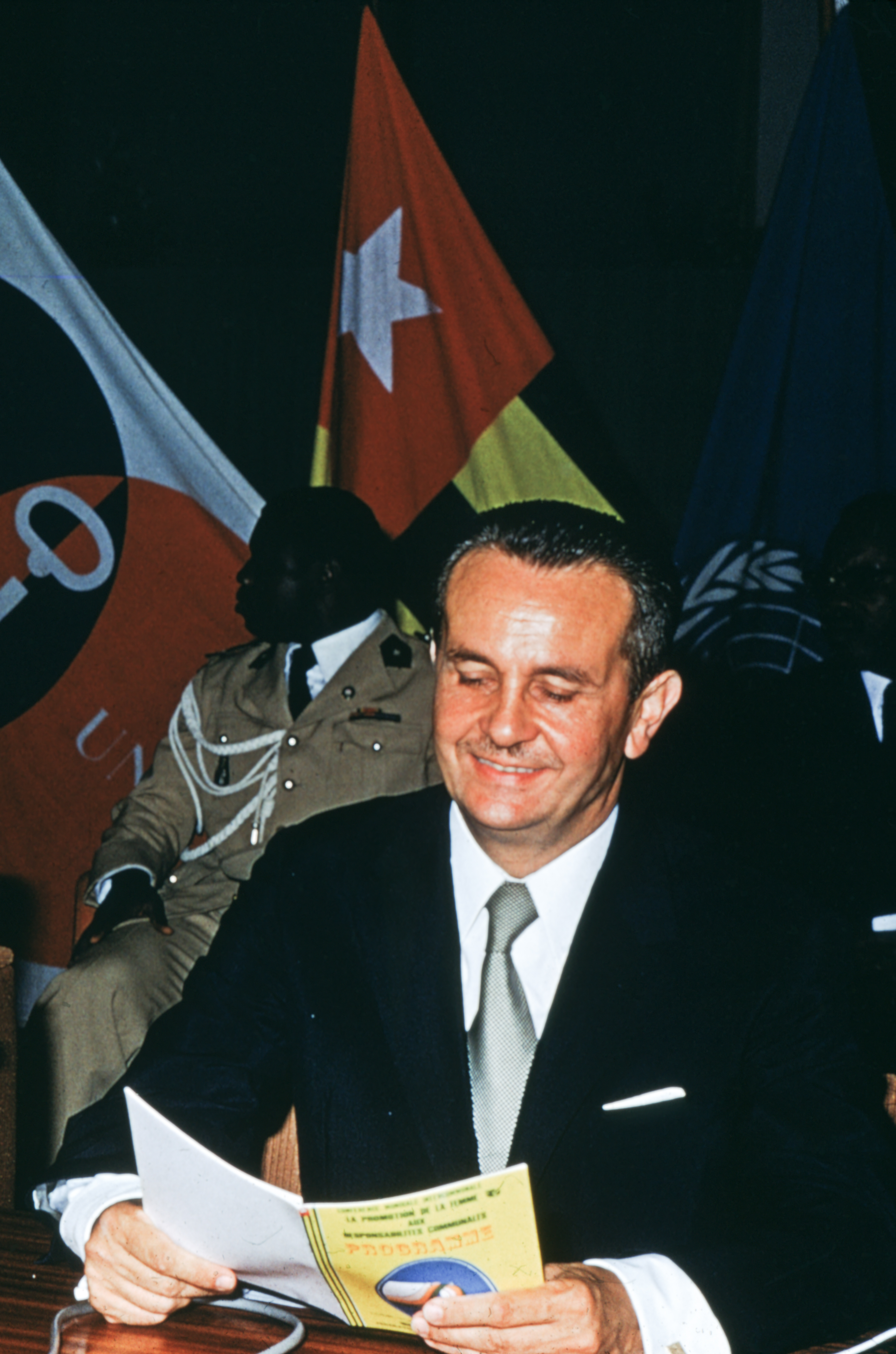
Philippe Malaud in 1975

Philippe Malaud (French: [filip malo]; 2 October 1925, in Paris – 14 October 2007, in Paris) was a French diplomat and politician. He graduated from the École nationale d'administration in 1956. From 1968 until 1978, he was a member of the Independent Republicans.

He was the minister of civil service between 1973 and 1974 and was Minister of Information for a short period of time. Between 1973 and 1981, he was a member of the Parliament. Then between 1984 and 1989, he was a Member of the European Parliament.
