= Valeurs actuelles =

French far-right-wing weekly magazine

- Issue #4323 from 3–9 October 2019 showing Emmanuel Macron and the logo of Freemasonry. The headline reads "The true power of the Freemasons" and the subheading is "IVF, euthanasia, Islam: the great works of the 'brothers'. The men and the ambitions of a network at the top of the State".
- Editor: Geoffroy Lejeune
- Categories: Newsmagazine
- Frequency: Weekly
- Circulation: 55,276 (2026)
- Founder: Raymond Bourgine
- Founded: 1966; 60 years ago
- Company: Valmonde
- Country: France
- Based in: Paris
- Language: French
- Website: www.valeursactuelles.com
- ISSN: 0049-5794

Valeurs actuelles (French pronunciation: [valœʁ(z‿)aktɥɛl]; lit. 'Current Values') is a French weekly news magazine published in Paris. It was initially considered to be right-wing but is today associated with the far-right. It was founded by Raymond Bourgine in 1966.

== History ==
Valeurs actuelles was founded in 1966 by Raymond Bourgine as an offspring of the weekly Finances, a stock market information review. The magazine gradually became an opinion and generalist publication with a liberal-conservative tendency. In 1971 Valeurs actuelles was relaunched.

Formerly owned by Socpresse the magazine has been owned by Valmonde, a subsidiary of Sud Communication. The company is owned by Pierre Fabre, who founded Laboratoires Pierre Fabre.

The main articles of the magazine are the editorial, written by François d'Orcival; the lettre de M. de Rastignac ("Rastignac's letter"), a humour piece about French politics that comments on present politicians by calling them by names of supporting characters from Balzac's works.

From 1966 to his death in 1972, the movie section was written by the antisemitic and collaborationist writer Lucien Rebatet, under the pseudonym of François Vinneuil.

In 2014, Valeurs actuelles published a false survey favorable to Nicolas Sarkozy. Valeurs actuelles also leaked informations about journalists from the newspaper Le Monde who were investigating on Nicolas Sarkozy, which triggered the accusation of breach of secrecy of the sources for a dozen French newspapers.

On March 5, 2015, Yves de Kerdrel, publishing director of Valeurs Actuelles, was sentenced by the 17th chamber of the Paris Criminal Court for incitement to discrimination, hatred or violence against Roma and defamation for a file devoted to Roma; a decision confirmed on appeal on December 9, 2015.

In 2019, President Emmanuel Macron gave the magazine an interview and talked critically about Islam, the veil and immigration with the publication. This created much fury from left-wing politicians.

Macron defended his interview by saying he wanted to reach out to other audiences as well. He called Valeurs actuelles "a very good magazine, you have to read it to know what the right thinks".

In August 2020, Valeurs actuelles published an illustration of the black Member of Parliament Danièle Obono as a slave in chains as part of a political fiction series on public figures transposed in different historical eras, prompting an outcry from politicians of numerous parties. Deputy editor Tugdual Denis apologised for the image but denied accusations of racism. Valeurs actuelles was judged for a racist insult in June 2021. On 29 September the magazine was found guilty of making racist comments under French hate speech rules against the Member of Parliament from the far-left France Unbowed party. The publisher, Erik Monjalous, the managing editor, Geoffroy Lejeune, and the article editor, Laurent Dandrieu, were each fined 1,500€, and ordered to pay a penalty fine of 5,000€ to Obono. In the 16 November 2022 appeal, Monjalous and author Laurent Jullien were found guilty and Lejeune absolved.

In 2021, a few months after the murder of Samuel Paty, Valeurs actuelles publishes a fake news about a professor who would be threatened with death by his students because of the study of the Holocaust.

In 2021, on the anniversary of the Algiers putsch, the magazine published an open letter by retired military personnel, who warned the country was heading for "civil war" due to Islamist religious extremism, and hinted at the possibility of a military coup. They are close to the extreme right and conspiratorial circles of the great replacement and the National Rally. For the political scientist specializing in the far right Jean-Yves Camus, an intervention by the army in favor of the far right remains a fantasy fueled by a very small and retired army movement, and not a real threat.

== Circulation ==
Valeurs actuelles is mostly distributed to subscribers. Its circulation in 1981 was 113,000 copies. The estimated circulation of the magazine was 90,000 copies in 1988. The magazine sold 116,126 copies in France in 2015, and 108,239 in 2020.

== Contributors ==
Major contributors to the magazine include the following:

- Michel Gurfinkiel, editor-in-chief from 1985 to 2006, now editor-at-large.
- Paul-Marie Coûteaux, former MPF-affiliated MEP (1999–2009)
- Olivier Dassault, UMP deputy of the National Assembly, Dassault Group
- Chantal Delsol
- Laurent Dandrieu
- Gilles-William Goldnadel
- Catherine Nay
- John Rees
- Philippe de Saint Robert
- Philippe Tesson
- Denis Tillinac
- Jean Tulard
