= Debout la France =

Political party in France

- Abbreviation: DLF
- Leader: Nicolas Dupont-Aignan
- Secretary-General: Pierre-Jean Robinot
- Vice President: Cécile Bayle de Jessé
- Vice President: José Evrard
- Vice President: Gerbert Rambaud
- Founder: Nicolas Dupont-Aignan
- Founded: 23 November 2008; 17 years ago
- Split from: Union for a Popular Movement
- Succeeded by: French Future
- Headquarters: 55, rue de Concy 91330 Yerres; 93, rue de l'Université 75007 Paris
- Youth wing: Debout les Jeunes
- Membership (2018): ▲22,000 (claimed)
- Ideology: French nationalism; National conservatism; Traditional Gaullism; Right-wing populism; Hard Euroscepticism; Sovereigntism
- Political position: Right-wing to far-right
- National affiliation: Union pour la France
- European affiliation: ADDE (2015–2017); ECR (2019–2020)
- Colours: Blue, white, red (French Tricolore); Blue (customary)
- Slogan: Neither System Nor Extreme
- National Assembly: 0 / 577
- Senate: 0 / 348
- European Parliament: 0 / 81
- Presidency of Regional Councils: 0 / 17
- Presidency of Departmental Councils: 0 / 101

Website
- www.debout-la-france.fr

Debout la France (DLF; [dəbu la fʁɑ̃s], lit. 'France Arise'), originally called Debout la République (DLR; [dəbu la ʁepyblik], lit. 'Republic Arise'), is a French political party founded by Nicolas Dupont-Aignan in 1999 as the "genuine Gaullist" branch of the Rally for the Republic. It was relaunched again in 2000 and 2002 and held its inaugural congress as an autonomous party in 2008. At the 2014 congress, its name was changed to Debout la France.

It is led by Nicolas Dupont-Aignan, who held the party's only seat in the French National Assembly before his unseating in 2024. Dupont-Aignan contested the 2012 French presidential election and received 644,043 votes in the first ballot, or 1.79% of the votes cast, finishing seventh. In the 2007 French presidential election, he had failed to win the required 500 endorsements from elected officials to run. He dropped out without endorsing any candidate; however, he was re-elected by the first round of the 2007 French legislative election as a DLF candidate in his home department of Essonne.

The party was a member of EUDemocrats, a Eurosceptic transnational European political party. For the 2019 European Parliament election in France, the party joined forces with the National Centre of Independents and Peasants to form an alliance named Les Amoureux de la France (lit. 'The Lovers of France'), and announced its alliance with the European Conservatives and Reformists.

== Popular support and electoral record ==
DLF's electoral support is concentrated in Dupont-Aignan's department of Essonne, where the DLF list polled 5.02% in the 2009 European Parliament election in France, and it polled up to 36.14% in his hometown of Yerres. The party also polled well in the Île-de-France region (2.44%), the North-West (2.4%), and the East constituency (2.33%), owing the regions' conservative and Gaullist departments.

In the 2012 presidential election, Dupont-Aignan obtained 1.79% of votes at the first round and did not endorse any candidate in the second. In the following legislative elections, Dupont-Aignan was elected to the National Assembly in Essonne's 8th constituency. The 2014 European Parliament election in France saw the party increase its share of the popular vote to 3.82%, although it failed to elect any MEPs.

Dupont-Aignan was again the party's candidate in the 2017 French presidential election, obtaining 4.73% of the vote in the first round. He then endorsed the National Rally (then the National Front)'s candidate Marine Le Pen in the second round. In the 2017 French legislative election, Dupont-Aignan was re-elected to the National Assembly.

== Ideology and positions ==
During the 2012 French presidential election, the party defined itself as representing social Gaullism and an alternative to the left–right divide. When founding the party, Dupont-Aignan positioned it to the right of what he calls the "UMPS" (a neologism of the former centre-right Rally for the Republic and the centre-left Socialist Party) but not as hardline as the French National Front, which he summed up with the slogan "Neither System Nor Extreme".

The party has been defined by the media and political analysts as conservative, nationalist, and Gaullist. It is generally positioned on the right-wing or the far-right of the political spectrum, although the party and members of the French Council of State have disputed the latter label. On February 14, 2023, the Global Project Against Hate and Extremism (GPAHE) released a report in which it classified Debout La France as a "conspiracy" and "anti-immigrant" group.

On economic matters, the party takes a largely protectionist attitude (including offering tax incentives for businesses to remain in France) and supports nationalizing the French highway system. The party has advocated that France should leave the Eurozone and takes a highly critical stance of the European Union, denouncing what it regards as globalism against French identity and argues that France should reclaim sovereignty it regards as lost to the EU. It also calls for strict border controls, regulation of immigration, and the reopening of penal colonies for violent criminals and convicted terrorists.

== Elections ==
=== Presidency ===
Presidency of the French Republic
Election year	Candidate	First round			Second round			Result
Election year	Candidate	Votes	%	Rank	Votes	%	Rank	Result
2012	Nicolas Dupont-Aignan	643,907	1.79	▲7th	—N/a			Lost
2017	Nicolas Dupont-Aignan	1,695,000	4.70	▲6th	—N/a			Lost
2022	Nicolas Dupont-Aignan	725,176	2.06	▼9th	—N/a			Lost

=== European Parliament ===
European Parliament
Election year	Number of votes	% of overall vote	No. of seats won
2009	304,585	1.77%	0
2014	744,441	3.82%	0
2019	795,508	3.51%	0

=== Regional Councils ===
Grand Est
Election year	Number of votes	% of overall vote	No. of seats won
2015	84,886	4.78%	0

Nouvelle-Aquitaine
Election year	Number of votes	% of overall vote	No. of seats won
2015	69,285	3.35%	0

Auvergne-Rhône-Alpes
Election year	Number of votes	% of overall vote	No. of seats won
2015	71,538	2.85%	0

Bourgogne-Franche-Comté
Election year	Number of votes	% of overall vote	No. of seats won
2015	49,774	5.17%	0

Bretagne
Election year	Number of votes	% of overall vote	No. of seats won
2015	34,916	2.90%	0

Centre-Val de Loire
Election year	Number of votes	% of overall vote	No. of seats won
2015	39,406	4.58%	0

Île-de-France
Election year	Number of votes	% of overall vote	No. of seats won
2010	119,835	4.15%	0
2015	207,286	6.57%	0

Occitanie
Election year	Number of votes	% of overall vote	No. of seats won
2015	80,375	3.91%	0

Réunion
Election year	Number of votes	% of overall vote	No. of seats won
2015	978	0.37%	0

Lorraine
Election year	Number of votes	% of overall vote	No. of seats won
2010	14,880	2.25%	0

Hauts-de-France
Election year	Number of votes	% of overall vote	No. of seats won
2015	53,359	2.39%	0

Normandy
Election year	Number of votes	% of overall vote	No. of seats won
2015	47,391	4.14%	0

Pays de la Loire
Election year	Number of votes	% of overall vote	No. of seats won
2015	51,873	4.09%	0

Provence-Alpes-Côte d'Azur
Election year	Number of votes	% of overall vote	No. of seats won
2015	34,599	1.95%	0

Upper Normandy
Election year	Number of votes	% of overall vote	No. of seats won
2010	10,237	1.79%	0

== Elected officials ==
Nicolas Dupont-Aignan from Essonne was the only DLF member of the National Assembly before losing reelection in 2024. The party also claims three general councillors and mayors in four communes: Yerres, Cambrai, Saint-Prix, and Ancinnes.
