= Gilles Bourdouleix =

French politician

Deputy for Maine-et-Loire's 5th constituency in the French National Assembly
- In office 19 June 2002 – 20 June 2017
- Preceded by: Maurice Ligot
- Succeeded by: Denis Masséglia

Mayor of Cholet
- Incumbent
- Assumed office 19 June 1995
- Preceded by: Maurice Ligot

Regional Councillor of Loire
- In office 15 March 1998 – 1 August 2002

President of the CNIP
- In office 24 October 2009 – 5 November 2015
- Preceded by: Annick du Roscoät
- Succeeded by: Bruno North

Personal details
- Born: 15 April 1960 (age 66) Angers, France
- Spouse: Natacha Poupet
- Profession: Lawyer

Gilles Bourdouleix (born 15 April 1960) is a French politician and former member of the National Assembly of France. He was the deputy for Maine-et-Loire's 5th constituency from 2002 to 2017. He is also the former spokesman of the National Centre of Independents and Peasants, of which he has been the president since 24 October 2009. Bourdouleix was a founding member of the Union of Democrats and Independents, a party from which he resigned on 24 July 2013.

== Political life ==
Gilles Bourdouleix was elected mayor of Cholet the first time on 19 June 1995 with a lead of 148 votes. He succeeded Maurice Ligot who was his chief of staff. He was elected mayor again in the second round of voting in March 2001 with 61.69% of the votes. He was again reelected in 2008.

In 2002, Bourdouleix was elected a member of the National Assembly of France as a member of the UMP. He has continued to serve in the office since then, though switching parties to Union of Democrats and Independents for his third election in 2012 and then leaving parties all together in August 2013. Bourdouleix represents the department of Maine-et-Loire.

== Controversy ==
In July 2013, French blogger Benjamin Charles-Lemaire revealed that Bourdouleix said Adolf Hitler had not killed enough Romani people. Bourdouleix, who had been faced with Nazi salutes and accusations of racism, is said to have stated about a group of Romani people in exasperation, "It's almost as if Hitler didn't kill enough [of them]." On 22 July these remarks were reported in the French newspaper Le Courrier de l'Ouest which led to a significant political outcry against Bourdouleix. Bourdouleix went on to defend himself saying, "You all call me Hitler, and you think that's okay, no?" He then went on to clarify, "[I said that] if I were Hitler, these people here would be killed. There, that's basically what I said."

After Bourdouleix refuted comments published by Lemaire, Le Courrier de l'Ouest published audio recording in order to verify their claims, and a forensic analysis of the recording certified it as authentic. This, along with the initial accusations, led to an investigation of Bourdouleix by the Criminal Court of Angers which charged him with condoning crimes against humanity and defamation of the newspaper Le Courrier de l'Ouest. On 23 January 2014 Bourdouleix was found guilty of the charge and was fined 3,000 euros, though his fine was suspended. On 12 August 2014 Bourdouleix's conviction was upheld by the Court of Appeal. On 15 December 2015 the Court of Appeal cancelled the sentence.
