= Albert Gazier =

French trade union leader and politician

- Albert Gazier, CGT delegate to the Free French government, October 1943

Minister of Information
- In office 12 July 1950 – 11 August 1951
- Preceded by: Jean Letourneau
- Succeeded by: Robert Buron

Minister of Social Affairs
- In office 1 February 1956 – 6 November 1957
- Preceded by: Paul Bacon
- Succeeded by: Paul Bacon

Minister of Information
- In office 17 May 1958 – 1 June 1958
- Succeeded by: André Malraux

Personal details
- Born: 16 May 1908 Valenciennes, Nord, France
- Died: 2 March 1997 (aged 88) Vanves, Hauts-de-Seine

Albert Gazier (French pronunciation: [albɛʁ ɡazje]; 16 May 1908 – 2 March 1997) was a French trade union leader and politician. During World War II (1939–45) he helped reorganize the unions during the German occupation of France. He escaped arrest by the Gestapo, made his way to England, and represented the trade union movement in General de Gaulle's Free French government. After the war he was a deputy in the legislature from 1945 to 1958. He was Minister of Information from 1950 to 1951 and again for two weeks in 1958. He was Minister of Social Affairs from 1956 to 1957. As a minister he tried but failed to contain health costs, and contributed to the fiasco of the Suez Crisis.

== Early years (1908–28) ==
Albert Gazier was born in Valenciennes, Nord, on 16 May 1908. His family adhered to Jansenism, and has been traced to a peasant family in 1814 in Taverny, to the north of Paris. His grandfather, Augustin Gazier (1844–1922) was a professor of literature at the Sorbonne who headed the Association of Friends of Port-Royal-des-Champs. His parents were Félix Gazier (1878–1916) and Victorine Louise Gonet (1885–1965). His father taught literature at the Lycée de Valenciennes, and was co-editor of a major edition of the works of Pascal. He had one sister, born a year later.

On the eve of World War I (1914–18) the family was transferred to Orléans. Albert began his education at the Lycée d'Orléans, where his father taught. His father was mobilized at the start of the war and became an infantry captain. He died on 20 September 1916 at Bouchavesnes, in the Somme, when Albert Glazier was 8 years old. On 24 February 1920 Gazier became a Pupil of the Nation. His family moved to Paris, where Albert was admitted to the Lycée Condorcet. He obtained a baccalauréat in philosophy and mathematics in 1925. After leaving school he contracted tuberculosis, and was bedridden for two years. Due to his illness his military service in the class of 1928 was waived, and the next year he was exempted from service.

== Sales clerk and union leader (1928–39) ==
At the age of 20 Gazier obtained a job on 31 May 1928 with the bookstore of the Presses Universitaires de France in the Latin Quarter of Paris. He enrolled in the Faculty of Law of Paris, and studied in the evenings. He obtained his license as a lawyer in 1932. Gazier joined the General Confederation of Labour (Confédération générale du travail, CGT) in 1930. He created a section for book salespeople within the Union of Employees of the Paris Region (Chambre syndicale des Employés de la région parisienne), a union affiliated with the Federation of Employees (Fédération des Employés) headed by Oreste Capocci.

Gazier joined the French Socialist Party (Section Française de l'Internationale Ouvrière, SFIO) in 1932 as an activist in the Bois-Colombes section. He was a socialist candidate in the Bois-Colombes municipal elections of 5–12 May 1935. He did not win, but did obtain the most votes of the Left, ahead of the communist candidate. In September 1935, Gazier was elected secretary-general of the Union of Employees of the Paris Region, while continuing to work as a bookseller. The union included employees of banks, credit unions, department stores, small shops and so on. Gazier officially left the book shop on 30 April 1936, and became a full-time union employee. He ran unsuccessfully in the legislative elections of April 1936.

In June 1936, when the department store employees went on strike, the number of members of Gazier's Union of Employees of the Paris Region shot up from 5,000 to 90,000. Gazier's influence in the CGT grew correspondingly. From 1936 he helped with the CGT Higher Institute for Workers' Education, and wrote some pamphlets for this institute. He was associated with Léon Jouhaux's group in the CGT and condemned the Molotov–Ribbentrop Pact between the Soviet Union and Germany in August 1939.

== World War II (1939–45) ==
At the outbreak of World War II in September 1939 Gazier enlisted voluntarily, despite having been exempted from military service in 1928. He served for ten months, then was demobilized in July 1940 after the German victory. Gazier was reconfirmed as secretary general of the Union of Paris Region Employees on 6 October 1940. He opposed the policies of the Vichy government and of René Belin, the former secretary of the CGT who had become a minister. On 9 November 1940 the government dissolved the unions. Gazier was one of twelve union leaders who signed the manifesto of opposition to the occupation in the autumn on 1940. (Note: In addition to Gazier the signatories of the manifesto were Christian Pineau, Robert Lacoste, Louis Saillant, Oreste Capocci, François Chevalme, Eugène Jaccoud, PIerre Neumeyer and Victor Vandeputte for the CGT, and Maurice Bouladoux, Gaston Tessier and Jules Zirnheld for the French Confederation of Christian Workers (Confédération française des travailleurs chrétiens, CFTC).) This became the basis for resistance by the unions.

Gazier's union continued to try to support workers, prevent layoffs and obtain wage increases. However, it was not allowed to distribute leaflets or publish newspapers, and the collaborationist press gave it little attention. In September 1942 Gazier refused to sit on the high council of the industrial economy. He was one of the founders of the Libération-Nord movement of the French Resistance. Gazier's union became one of the main sources of false identity cards in Paris. Gazier was named one of the seven secretaries of the clandestine CGT. This was confirmed after the trade union reunification in April 1943.

In 1942 Gazier escaped arrest by the Gestapo, and in 1943 went into hiding. He was appointed CGT delegate to Free France, and on 19 October 1943 flew to London. For this secret journey he went via Lyon to Lons-le-Saunier in the Jura, getting off one station before his destination. He waited in a cow shelter near the village of Villevieux until the British airplane landed in a small field guarded by Resistance members, then flew to England with twelve other passengers. Gazier went on from London to Algiers, where he represented the CGT in the Provisional Consultative Assembly convened by General Charles de Gaulle.

The CGT and Christian democratic union delegates helped defuse tensions between resisters and politicians in the Assembly. Glazier observed that, "For the first time in the history of the labor movement trade unionists took part in their own right in a political assembly."

After the liberation Gazier returned to France on 4 September 1944 and was confirmed as a secretary of the CGT. He was part of the team that published the journal Résistance Ouvrière from 24 November 1944. In January 1945 Gazier was with the CGT delegation that went to Moscow with Benoît Frachon.

He accompanied Frachon to the World Trade Union Conference in London, and was appointed to the executive committee of the World Federation of Trade Unions. At the London conference in February 1945 he argued unsuccessfully for separation of political and union offices on the basis that they were incompatible. At the confederal congress of the CGT from 27–30 March 1945 he was named a secretary of the CGT.

== Deputy (1945–58) ==
Gazier was elected to the first National Constituent Assembly from 21 October 1945 to 10 June 1946 as deputy for the Seine department. After his election he ceased his union activities. On 3 November 1945 he married Marie-Louise Elter, a 35-year-old widow and teacher whom he had met in Algiers. Gazier was opposed to both the communists and the Gaullists. He was under-secretary of state for the national economy and finance from 26 January 1946 to 24 June 1946 in the cabinet of Félix Gouin. He was reelected to the second National Constituent Assembly from 2 June 1946 to 27 November 1946. He was under-secretary of state for public works and transport from 24 June 1946 to 16 December 1946 in the cabinet of Georges Bidault. He was elected to the legislature on 10 November 1946. He was secretary of state for the presidency of the provisional government of Léon Blum from 16 December 1946 to 22 January 1947.

Gazier was a member of the executive committee of the SFIO from 1947 to 1969. He was Minister of Information from 12 July 1950 to 11 August 1951 in the cabinets of René Pleven and Henri Queuille. As Minister of Information he helped improve the equipment of Radiodiffusion française, and introduced advertising programs. He was reelected to the legislature on 17 June 1951. He argued for participation of the SFIO in the government of Pierre Mendès France in 1954, a minority position. During the Moroccan crisis of October 1955 Glazer spoke of the trend for colonies to move towards independence around the world. He did not think it was practical to give autonomy to Morocco and Tunisia while treating Algeria as an integral part of France. He felt the government had to work out how to give sovereignty to Algeria while being careful to protect the French population. He was again elected to the legislature on 2 January 1956.

Gazier was Minister of Social Affairs from 1 February 1956 to 6 November 1957 in the cabinet of Guy Mollet and the subsequent cabinet of Maurice Bourgès-Maunoury. He drew up a proposal to limit increases in doctors' fees to the rate of inflation. The ministry would define the fees, which would be indexed to the cost of living and the minimum wage. A maximum of 15% of doctors would be allowed to charge more, under legally defined conditions. Patients of the doctors who charged above the maximum could not apply for reimbursement by social security. When the number of doctors charging excess fees had risen to 15%, social security funds would be allowed to establish their own health centers, or to make arrangements with doctors to provide services. The proposal caused a public outcry and attacks against Gazier.

Rural doctors accepted the Gazier proposal, but the richer urban doctors opposed it. The proposal was adopted by the cabinet on 30 January 1957. The medical association escalated its campaign against the proposal in the press and in parliament. The proposal was dropped after the Mollet cabinet fell in May 1957.

During the Suez Crisis, in October 1956 Gazier was in charge of the Quai d'Orsay while Christian Pineau, the Minister of Foreign Affairs, was in New York. He was concerned that the Israelis would respond to the presence of Iraqi troops in Jordan by occupying the West Bank. On 14 October 1936 he flew to London with General Maurice Challe to meet Prime Minister Anthony Eden.

He pointed out that while Britain was obliged by treaty to support Jordan, France would have to support Israel, putting them on opposite sides. Eden told Gazier and Challe he would ask the Iraqis to hold back from moving troops to Jordan. Gazier pressed Eden on how he would react to an Israeli attack on Egypt, and Eden said he would not support the Egyptian President Gamal Abdel Nasser if that happened.

They discussed the possibility of encouraging the Israelis to attack Egypt and quickly occupy the Sinai Peninsula, at which point France and Britain would send in a police force "to separate the combatants" which would occupy the whole length of the canal. Eden's acceptance of this plan led to the fall of his government and the end of British authority in the Middle East.

Gazier was Minister of Information from 17 May 1958 to 1 June 1958 in the short-lived government of Pierre Pflimlin. Although close to Guy Mollet, Gazier would not join him in supporting de Gaulle.

In the National Assembly in June 1958 and in the constitutional referendum in September 1958 he voted against de Gaulle's new constitution. He had broken completely with the leadership of the SFIO. He lost his seat in the October 1958 elections. His mandate as deputy ended on 8 December 1958 at the end of the French Fourth Republic.

== Later career (1959–97) ==
After leaving the chamber Gazier joined a socialist advisory group as head of its department of Third World cooperation. In 1962 the National Center of Socialist Studies (Centre national d'études socialistes) published a study by Gazier on cooperation and aid to under-developed countries. The analysis covered the reasons for under-development, the different problems that these countries experienced, and finally the different solutions that he considered feasible. At that time there were 3 billion inhabitants of the planet, of whom 2 billion lived in misery. He noted that in the French African colonies many goods were sold at much higher prices than were charged in metropolitan France, typically at 50% more. In these countries the life expectancy was 30 to 35 years, compared to 67 years in France. The birth rate was extremely high, and the consequences were Malthusian. He criticized the encouragement of monoculture farming and lack of investment in industrial development. He said it was certain that the prophecies of Karl Marx would come true if socialist and unionist actions did not put an end to the absolute poverty of the workers.

In the 1960s Gazier, Christian Pineau and Gerard Jacquet formed a minority in the SFIO hostile to the new powers. He supported the appointment of François Mitterrand to the leadership of the Socialist Party in June 1971. He sat on the steering committee and the executive board until 1972, then led the "group of experts". In 1981 Gazier accepted a position as an adviser to Pierre Mauroy. In 1983 François Mitterrand appointed him to the High Council of the Judiciary (Conseil supérieur de la magistrature). Albert Gazier died on 2 March 1997 in Vanves, Hauts-de-Seine.

== Publications ==
- Albert Gazier (1937). Les Congés payés, état de la législation. Conférences de l'Institut supérieur ouvrier. Série éducation syndicale, V (in French). Paris: Centre confédéral d'éducation ouvrière. p. 31.
- Albert Gazier. Le Syndicalisme chrétien. Conférences de l'Institut supérieur ouvrier, série éducation syndicale, XII (in French). Paris: Centre confédéral d'éducation ouvrière. p. 44.
- Albert Gazier. l'Echelle mobile des salaires. Conférences de l'Institut supérieur ouvrier. Série éducation syndicale, XXII (in French). Paris: Centre confédéral d'éducation ouvrière. p. 31.
- Albert Gazier (1941). L'Employé. Bibliothèque du peuple. N° 28 (in French). Paris: Presses universitaires de France. p. 64.
- Albert Gazier (1945). Naissance à Paris de la Fédération syndicale mondiale (in French). Paris: Agence d'édition et de presse (Impr. de l'A.E.P.). p. 31.
- Albert Gazier; Daniel Mayer; Pierre Ségelle (1949). Les Socialistes promoteurs, défenseurs, animateurs de la Sécurité sociale (in French). Paris: Ed. du Parti socialiste S.F.I.O. p. 143.
- Albert Gazier; Kléber Loustau (1955). Pour un renouveau économique et social (in French). Speech at the 26th National Congress of the Socialist Party at Asnières, 1–4 July 1954. Paris: Librairie des Municipalités. p. 24.
- René Coty; Albert Gazier; Guy Mollet; Joseph Paul-Boncour (1956). Cinquantenaire du Ministère du travail 1906-1956 (in French). Besançon: Impr. le Comtois. p. 24.
- Albert Gazier; Gérard Jaquet; Christian Pineau; Guy Mollet (preface) (October 1962). "Les Socialistes et l'Europe". Supplément à la documentation socialiste (in French). 143. Paris: Parti socialiste S.F.I.O.: 64.
- Albert Gazier (1962). "Les pays sous-développés". Supplément à la documentation socialiste (in French). 143. Centre national d'études socialistes.
- Albert Gazier (2006). Gilles Morin (ed.). Albert Gazier : autour d'une vie de militant (in French). Selected writings. Paris: Harmattan. p. 320. ISBN 2296005926.

== Sources ==
- "Albert Gazier Mandats" (in French). Assemblée nationale.
- Cépède, Frédéric (2005). "Albert Gazier". Socialistes à Paris: 1905-2005 (in French). creaphis editions. ISBN 978-2-913610-77-4.
- Cépède, Frédéric; Morin, Gilles (2006). "Albert Gazier 1908-1996 Esquisse biographique". Albert Gazier: autour d'une vie de militant (in French). Harmattan. ISBN 978-2-296-00592-1.
- Diarra, Abdoulaye (2014-04-17). La gauche française et l'Afrique subsaharienne. Colonisation, décolonisation, coopération (XIXe-XXe siècles). KARTHALA Editions. ISBN 978-2-8111-1094-9.
- Gildea, Robert (2015-09-01). Fighters in the Shadows: A New History of the French Resistance. Faber & Faber. ISBN 978-0-571-28035-3.
- Immergut, Ellen M. (1992-08-28). Health Politics: Interests and Institutions in Western Europe. CUP Archive. ISBN 978-0-521-41335-0.
- Kahler, Miles (2014-07-14). Decolonization in Britain and France: The Domestic Consequences of International Relations. Princeton University Press. ISBN 978-1-4008-5558-2.
- Kyle, Keith (2011-02-15). Suez: Britain's End of Empire in the Middle East. I.B.Tauris. ISBN 978-1-84885-533-5.
- La documentation française (2001). "GAZIER (Albert)". Dictionnaire des parlementaires français de 1940 à 1958 (in French). Vol. 4. E-K.
- Morin, Gilles (2004). "Albert Gazier". La Résistance en Ile-de-France (in French). DVD-Rom. AERI.
- Smith, Simon C (2013-06-28). Reassessing Suez 1956: New Perspectives on the Crisis and its Aftermath. Ashgate Publishing, Ltd. ISBN 978-1-4094-8013-6.
- Williams, Philip M.; Goldey, David; Harrison, Martin (1970-04-01). French Politicians and Elections 1951-1969. CUP Archive. p. 91. ISBN 978-0-521-09608-9.
