= Minister of Information (France) =

- Ministre de l'information
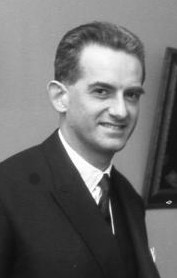
- Longest serving Alain Peyrefitte; 6 December 1962 – 8 January 1966
- Ministry of Information
- Status: Abolished
- Member of: Government: Council of Ministers
- Reports to: Prime Minister
- Nominator: Prime Minister
- Appointer: President
- Term length: No fixed term
- Formation: 13 March 1938
- First holder: Ludovic-Oscar Frossard
- Final holder: Jean-Philippe Lecat
- Abolished: 28 May 1974

The Minister of Information (French: Ministre de l'information) was the leader and most senior official of the French Ministry of Information. It was a position in the Government of France from 1938 to 1974 and no longer exists.

== History ==
Initially created under the name of Minister of Propaganda under the second government of Léon Blum, the office adopted the Information denomination with the following administrations until 1974, date to which it was definitely disestablished.

== Officeholders ==
=== Third Republic ===
No.	Portrait	Name	Term			Government	President	Ref.
No.	Portrait	Name	Took office	Left office	Time in office	Government	President	Ref.
Ministry established
1		Ludovic-Oscar Frossard	13 March 1938	10 April 1938	28 days	Blum II	Albert Lebrun	
Office vacant from 10 April 1938 to 29 July 1939.
2		Jean Giraudoux	29 July 1939	21 March 1940	236 days	Daladier IV–V	Albert Lebrun	
3		Ludovic-Oscar Frossard	21 March 1940	5 June 1940	76 days	Raynaud	Albert Lebrun	
4		Jean Prouvost	5 June 1940	12 July 1940	37 days	Raynaud; Pétain	Albert Lebrun	

=== Vichy France ===
No.	Portrait	Name	Term			Government	Chief	Ref.
No.	Portrait	Name	Took office	Left office	Time in office	Government	Chief	Ref.
-		Pierre Laval	12 July 1940	13 December 1940	154 days	Laval V	Philippe Pétain	
-		Paul Baudoin	13 December 1940	2 January 1941	20 days	Flandin	Philippe Pétain	
-		Paul Marion	23 February 1941	18 April 1942	1 year, 54 days	Darlan	Philippe Pétain	
-		Pierre Laval	18 April 1942	20 August 1944	2 years, 124 days	Laval VI	Philippe Pétain	

=== Free France ===
No.	Portrait	Name	Term			Government	Leader	Ref.
No.	Portrait	Name	Took office	Left office	Time in office	Government	Leader	Ref.
5		André Diethelm	24 September 1941	28 July 1942	307 days	CNF	Charles de Gaulle	
6		Jacques Soustelle	28 July 1942	7 June 1943	314 days	CNF	Charles de Gaulle	
7		Henri Bonnet	7 June 1943	10 September 1944	1 year, 95 days	CFLN	Charles de Gaulle	

=== Provisional Government ===
No.	Portrait	Name	Term			Government	President	Ref.
No.	Portrait	Name	Took office	Left office	Time in office	Government	President	Ref.
8		Pierre-Henri Teitgen	10 September 1944	30 May 1945	262 days	de Gaulle I	Charles de Gaulle	
9		Jacques Soustelle	30 May 1945	21 November 1945	175 days	de Gaulle I	Charles de Gaulle	
10		André Malraux	21 November 1945	26 January 1946	66 days	de Gaulle II	Charles de Gaulle	
11		Gaston Defferre	26 January 1946	24 June 1946	149 days	Gouin	Félix Gouin	
12		Robert Bichet	24 June 1946	16 December 1946	172 days	Bidault I	Georges Bidault	
Office vacant from 16 December 1946 to 26 July 1948.

=== Fourth Republic ===
No.	Portrait	Name	Term			Government	President	Ref.
No.	Portrait	Name	Took office	Left office	Time in office	Government	President	Ref.
13		François Mitterrand	26 July 1948	5 September 1948	41 days	Marie	Vincent Auriol	
Office vacant from 5 September 1948 to 28 October 1949.
14		Pierre-Henri Teitgen	28 October 1949	2 July 1950	247 days	Bidault I–II	Vincent Auriol	
15		Jean Letourneau	2 July 1950	12 July 1950	10 days	Queuille II	Vincent Auriol	
16		Albert Gazier	12 July 1950	11 August 1951	1 year, 30 days	Pleven I Queuille III	Vincent Auriol	
17		Robert Buron	11 August 1951	20 January 1952	162 days	Pleven II	Vincent Auriol	
18		Paul Coste-Floret	20 January 1952	8 March 1952	48 days	Faure I	Vincent Auriol	
Office vacant from 8 March 1952 to 8 January 1953.
19		Émile Hugues	8 January 1953	18 June 1954	1 year, 161 days	Mayer; Laniel I–II	Vincent Auriol	
19		Émile Hugues	8 January 1953	18 June 1954	1 year, 161 days	Mayer; Laniel I–II	René Coty	
Office vacant from 18 June 1954 to 20 February 1955.
20		Georges Galy-Gasparrou	20 January 1955	23 February 1955	34 days	Mendès-France	René Coty	
Office vacant from 23 February 1955 to 1 February 1956.
21		Gérard Jacquet	1 February 1956	17 June 1957	1 year, 136 days	Mollet	René Coty	
22		Michel Soulié	17 June 1957	11 November 1957	147 days	Bourgès-Maunoury	René Coty	
23		Émile Claparède	11 November 1957	17 May 1958	187 days	Gaillard	René Coty	
24		Albert Gazier	17 May 1958	1 June 1958	15 days	Pflimlin	René Coty	
25		André Malraux	1 June 1958	7 July 1958	36 days	de Gaulle III	René Coty	
26		Jacques Soustelle	7 July 1958	8 January 1959	185 days	de Gaulle III	René Coty	

=== Fifth Republic ===
No.	Portrait	Name	Term			Government	President	Ref.
No.	Portrait	Name	Took office	Left office	Time in office	Government	President	Ref.
27		Roger Frey	8 January 1959	5 February 1960	1 year, 28 days	Debré	Charles de Gaulle	
28		Louis Terrenoire	5 February 1960	24 August 1961	1 year, 178 days	Debré	Charles de Gaulle	
29		Christian de La Malène	24 August 1961	15 April 1962	234 days	Debré	Charles de Gaulle	
30		Alain Peyrefitte	15 April 1962	11 September 1962	149 days	Pompidou I	Charles de Gaulle	
31		Christian Fouchet	11 September 1962	6 December 1962	86 days	Pompidou I	Charles de Gaulle	
32		Alain Peyrefitte	6 December 1962	8 January 1966	3 years, 33 days	Pompidou II	Charles de Gaulle	
33		Yvon Bourges	8 January 1966	7 April 1967	1 year, 89 days	Pompidou III	Charles de Gaulle	
34		Georges Gorse	7 April 1967	31 May 1968	1 year, 54 days	Pompidou IV	Charles de Gaulle	
35		Yves Guéna	31 May 1968	12 July 1968	42 days	Pompidou IV	Charles de Gaulle	
36		Joël Le Theule	12 July 1968	22 June 1969	345 days	Couve de Murville	Charles de Gaulle	
36		Joël Le Theule	12 July 1968	22 June 1969	345 days	Couve de Murville	Interim : Alain Poher	
Office vacant from 22 June 1969 to 6 July 1972.
37		Philippe Malaud	6 July 1972	23 October 1973	1 year, 109 days	Messmer I–II	Georges Pompidou	
38		Jean-Philippe Lecat	23 October 1973	28 May 1974	217 days	Messmer II–III	Georges Pompidou	
38		Jean-Philippe Lecat	23 October 1973	28 May 1974	217 days	Messmer II–III	Interim : Alain Poher	
Ministry disestablished
