= Émile Hugues =

French politician

Secretary of State for Finance and Economic Affairs
- In office 11 August 1951 – 20 January 1952
- Prime Minister: René Pleven

Secretary of State for Information
- In office 8 January 1953 – 18 June 1954
- Prime Minister: René Mayer /Joseph Laniel

Minister of Justice
- In office 19 June 1954 – 3 September 1954
- Prime Minister: Pierre Mendès France

Secretary of State for Finance and Economic Affairs
- In office 17 June 1957 – 14 May 1958
- President: Maurice Bourgès-Maunoury/Félix Gaillard

Personal details
- Born: 7 April 1901 Vence, France
- Died: 10 February 1966 Paris
- Party: Radical-Socialist (1946-1958)
- Other political affiliations: Gauche démocratique (1959-1966)
- Profession: Lawyer

Émile Hugues (b. Vence, 7 April 1901 – d. Paris, 10 February 1966) was a French politician and government minister.

With a doctorate in law and by profession a notaire, Hugues was elected in 1946 as a Radical-Socialist député for the Alpes-Maritimes département to the second constituent National Assembly, and subsequently to the Assemblée nationale, in which he sat until 1958. In 1959, he was elected to the Senate as a member of the Gauche démocratique (Democratic Left). He died in office.

Hugues left the government following the rejection of the planned European Defence Community in 1954, which he had warmly supported. He followed Henri Queuille and André Morice into the Radical dissidence in 1956, which led to the creation of the Centre républicain. He voted for Charles de Gaulle in June 1958, but was beaten in the November 1958 elections.

He was mayor of Vence and councillor for the Alpes-Maritimes.

The castle in Vences is today the Fondation Émile Hugues, a modern and contemporary art museum.

== Government offices ==
- Secretary of State for Finance and Economic Affairs in the second government of René Pleven (11 August 1951 – 20 January 1952)
- Secretary of State for Information in the government of René Mayer (8 January – 28 June 1953)
- Secretary of State for Information in the governments of Joseph Laniel (2 July 1953 – 18 June 1954)
- Minister of Justice in the government of Pierre Mendès France (19 June – 3 September 1954)
- Secretary of State for Finance and Economic Affairs in the government of Maurice Bourgès-Maunoury (17 June – 6 November 1957)
- Secretary of State for Finance and Economic Affairs in the government of Félix Gaillard (11 November 1957 – 14 May 1958)
