= Robert Schuman =

Prime Minister of France from 1947 to 1948

Venerable Robert Schuman
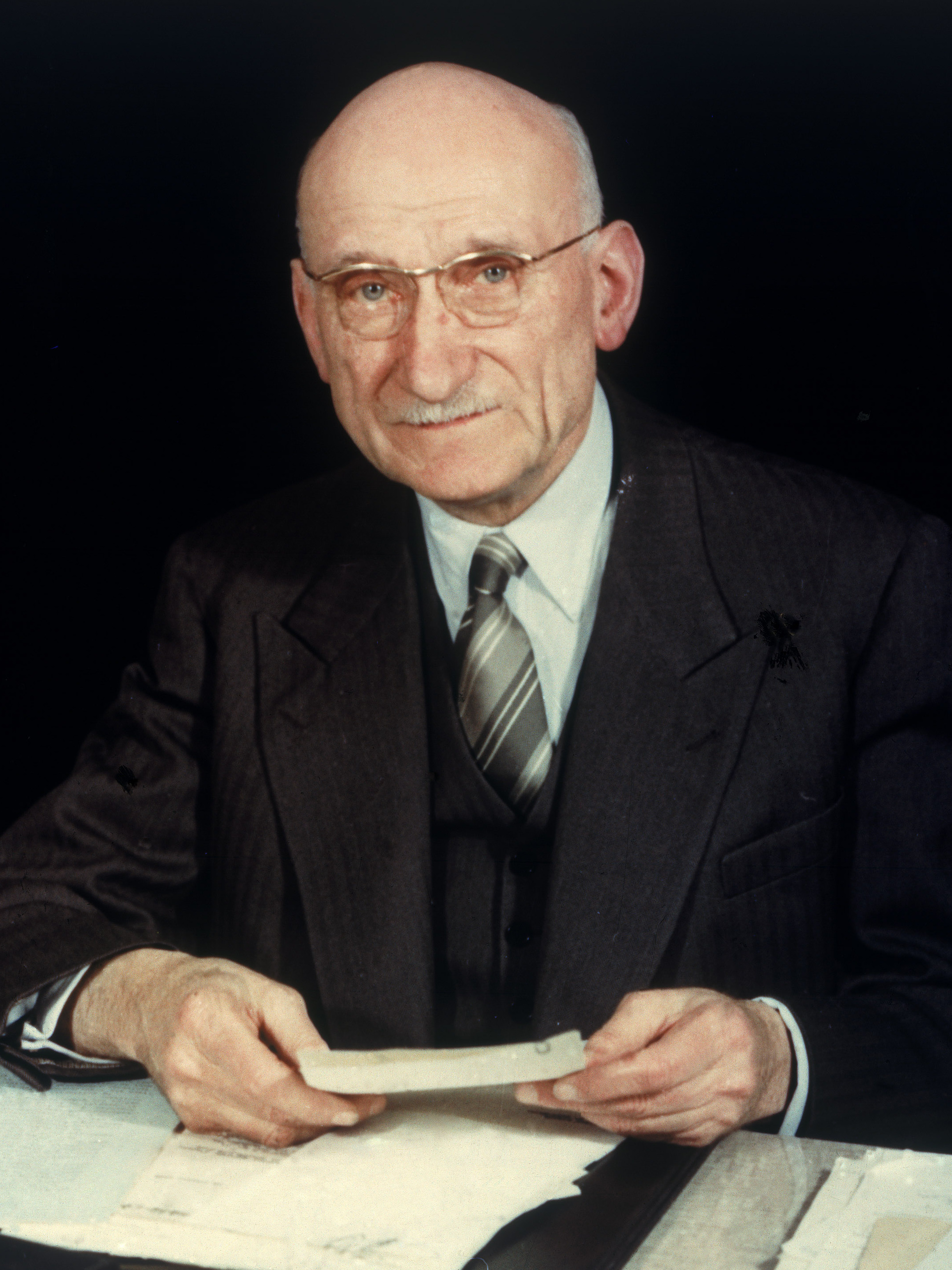
- Schuman in 1958

Prime Minister of France
- In office 5 September 1948 – 11 September 1948
- President: Vincent Auriol
- Preceded by: André Marie
- Succeeded by: Henri Queuille
- In office 24 November 1947 – 26 July 1948
- President: Vincent Auriol
- Preceded by: Paul Ramadier
- Succeeded by: André Marie

Minister of Foreign Affairs
- In office 26 July 1948 – 8 January 1953
- Prime Minister: André Marie; Himself; Henri Queuille; Georges Bidault; René Pleven; Edgar Faure; Antoine Pinay
- Preceded by: Georges Bidault
- Succeeded by: Georges Bidault

President of the European Parliament
- In office 19 March 1958 – 18 March 1960
- Preceded by: Hans Furler
- Succeeded by: Hans Furler

Personal details
- Born: Jean-Baptiste Nicolas Robert Schuman; 29 June 1886 Luxembourg City, Luxembourg
- Died: 4 September 1963 (aged 77) Scy-Chazelles, Lorraine, France
- Party: Popular Republican Movement
- Education: Friedrich Wilhelm University of Berlin; Ludwig-Maximilians-Universität München; University of Bonn; University of Strasbourg (Dr. jur.)

Jean-Baptiste Nicolas Robert Schuman (French: [ʁɔbɛʁ ʃuman]; 29 June 1886 – 4 September 1963) was a Luxembourg-born French statesman. Schuman was a Christian democratic (Popular Republican Movement) political thinker and activist. Twice Prime Minister of France, a reformist Minister of Finance and a Foreign Minister, he was instrumental in building postwar European and trans-Atlantic institutions and was one of the founders of the European Communities, the Council of Europe and NATO. He was the one who proposed the Schuman Declaration, which established the European Coal and Steel Community, ultimately a predecessor of the European Union. The 1964–1965 academic year at the College of Europe was named in his honour. In 2021, Schuman was declared venerable by Pope Francis in recognition of his acting on Christian principles.

== Early life ==
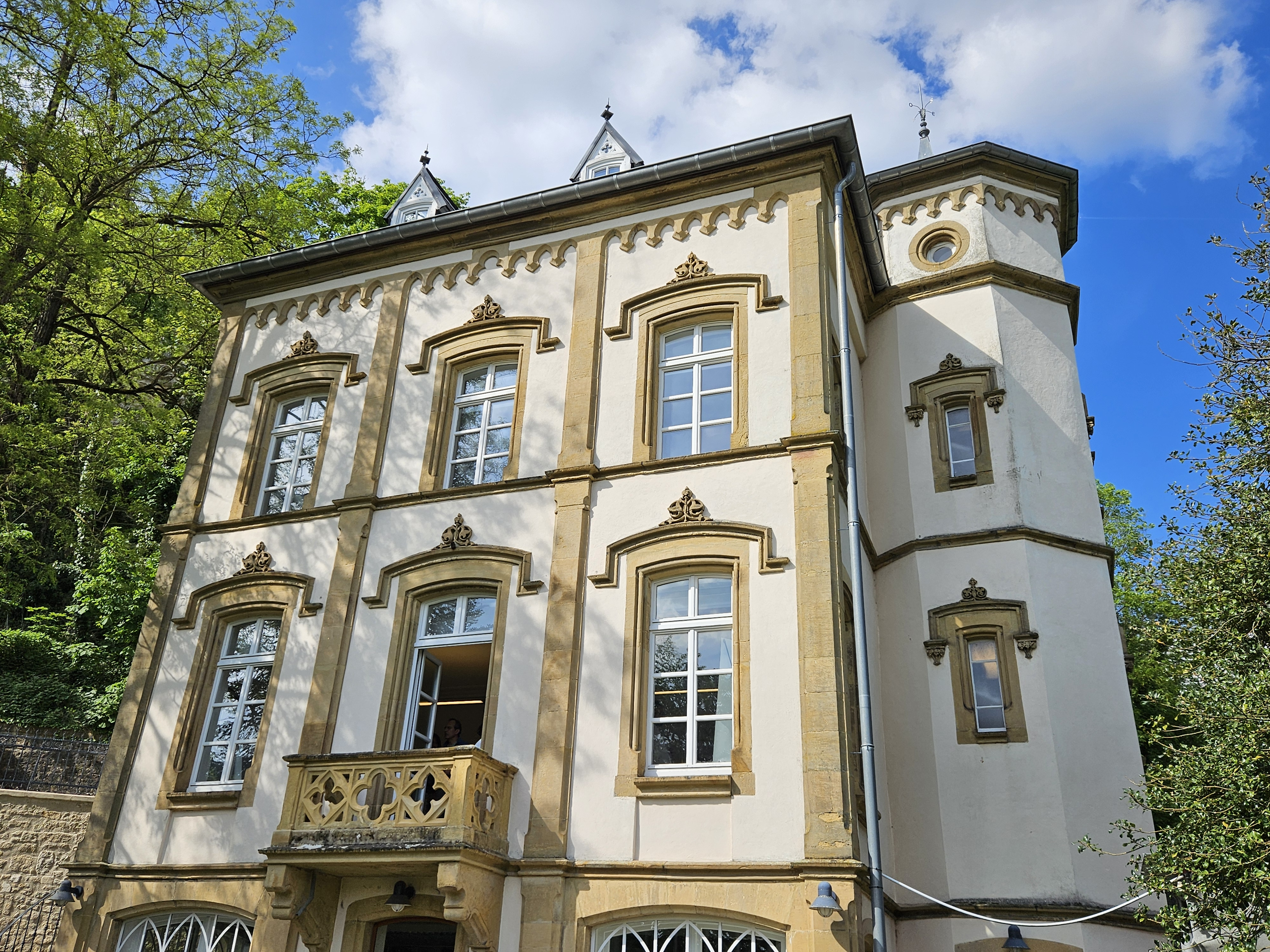
Schuman's birth house in Clausen, Luxembourg City

Jean-Baptiste Nicolas Robert Schuman was born on 29 June 1886 in Clausen, Luxembourg, inheriting his father's German citizenship. His father, Jean-Pierre Schuman (d. 1900), who was a native of Lorraine and was born a French citizen, had become a German citizen when Lorraine was annexed by Germany in 1871, and he left to settle in Luxembourg, not far from his native village of Évrange.

Schuman's mother, Eugénie Suzanne Duren (d. 1911), was a Luxembourger. Though Schuman would later become involved in French politics, he grew up and attended school in Luxembourg City, speaking Luxembourgish as his mother tongue.

Schuman's secondary schooling from 1896 to 1903 was at Athénée de Luxembourg, followed in 1904 by the Kaiserliches Lyceum in Metz. From 1904 to 1910, he studied law, economics, political philosophy, theology and statistics at the Friedrich Wilhelm University of Berlin, the Ludwig-Maximilians-Universität München, the University of Bonn and the University of Strasbourg, and received a law degree with the highest distinction from the University of Strasbourg. In 1904, Schuman joined the Catholic student association Unitas in Bonn.

In 1912, Schuman set up practice as a lawyer in Metz and joined the L'Union Populaire Catholique. When the war broke out in 1914, he was called up for the auxiliary troops by the German army in Metz but was excused from military service on health grounds. From 1915 to 1918, he served in the administration of the Bolchen kreis.

== Interwar period ==
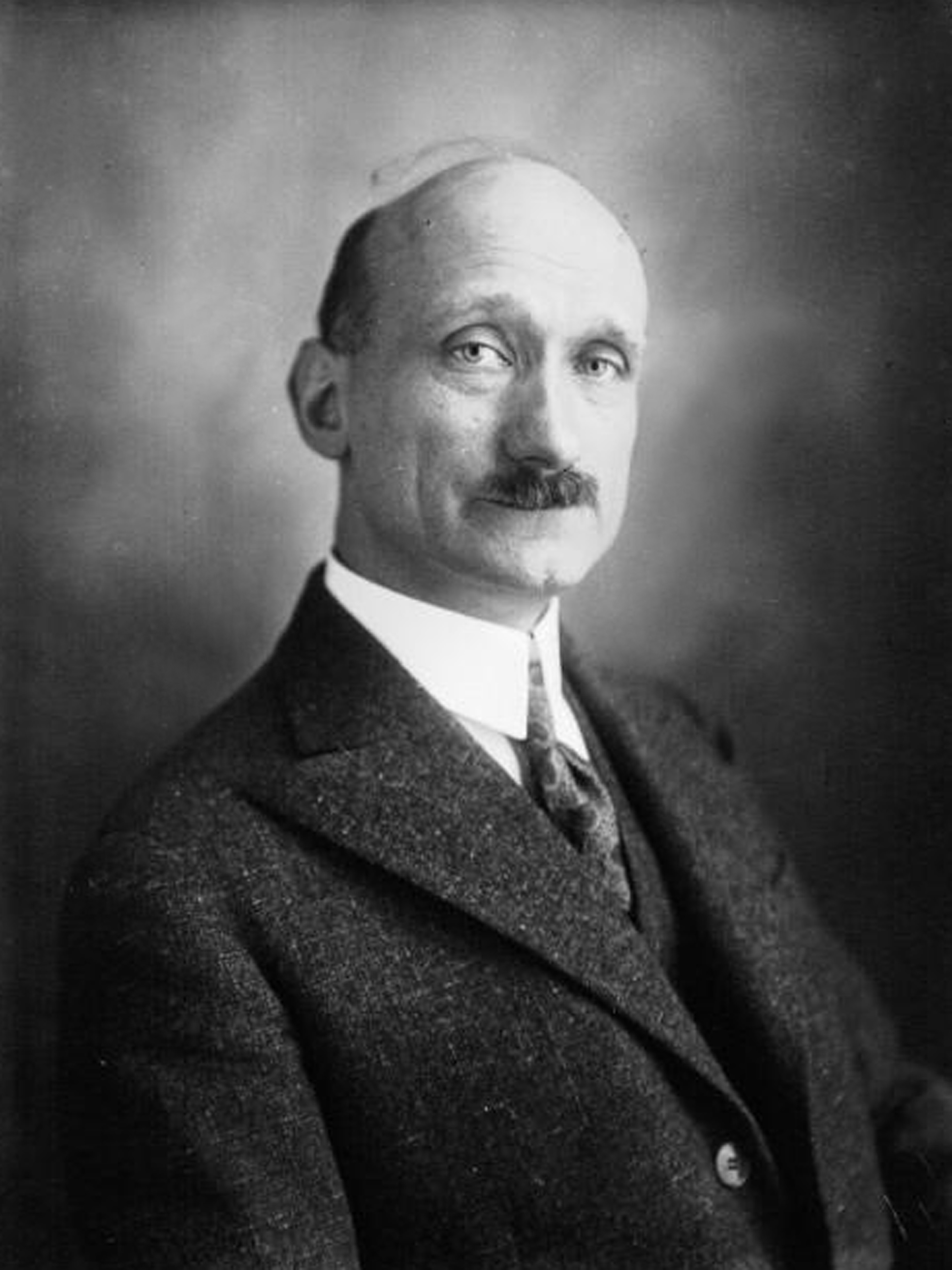
Portrait of Schuman, député from Moselle (1929)

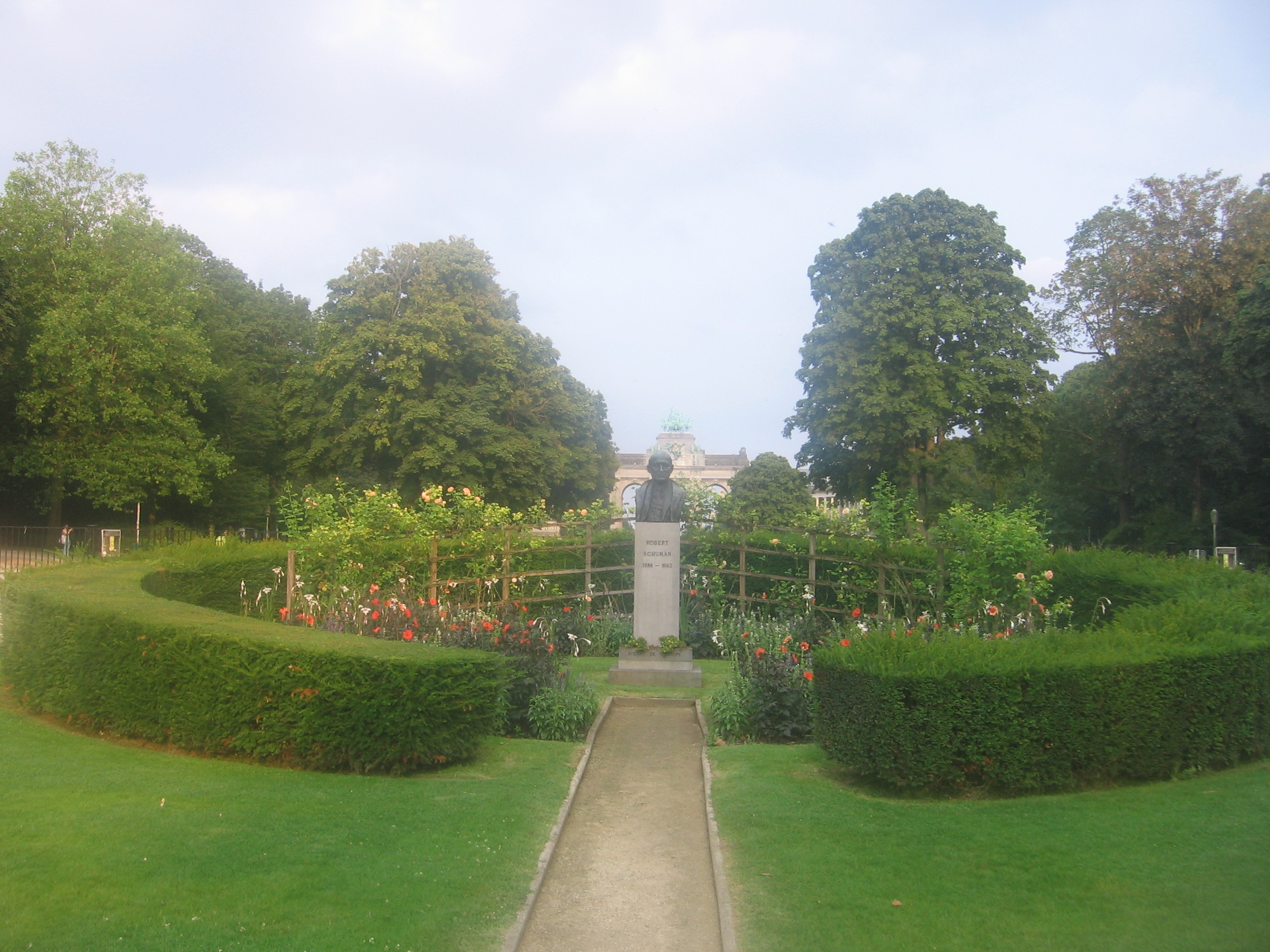
Statue of Schuman in Cinquantenaire, Brussels

After the First World War, Alsace-Lorraine was returned to France, and Schuman became a French citizen in 1918.

Schuman became active in French politics. In 1919, he was first elected as a member of the Chamber of Deputies on a regional list and later served as the deputy for Thionville (Moselle) until 1958, with an interval during the war. He made a major contribution to the drafting and the parliamentary passage of the reintroduction of the French Civil and Commercial Codes by the French parliament, when the Alsace-Lorraine region, then under German rule and thus German law, returned to France. The harmonisation of the regional law with the French law was called "Lex Schuman". Schuman also investigated and patiently uncovered postwar corruption in the Lorraine steel industries and in the Alsace and the Lorraine railways, which were bought for a derisory price by the powerful and influential de Wendel family in what he called in the Parliament "a pillage".

== World War II ==
In 1940, because of his expertise on Germany, Schuman was called to become a member of Paul Reynaud's wartime government to be in charge of the refugees. He kept that position during the first Pétain government. On 10 July, he voted to give full power to Marshal Philippe Pétain, who supported the armistice with Germany, but refused to continue to be in the government. On 14 September, he was arrested in Metz for acts of resistance and protest against Nazi methods. He was interrogated by the Gestapo but the intervention of a German lawyer stopped him from being sent to Dachau concentration camp. Schuman was placed then under house arrest in Neustadt but was able to escape to the unoccupied zone of France in August 1942. Between 1942 and 1944 he also stayed several times at various monasteries such as the En-Calcat Abbey whose liturgical hours he followed.

== French Under-Secretary of State ==
After the war, Schuman rose to great prominence. He initially had some difficulties. In 1940 he had voted for Petain. In Petain's cabinet governing 16 June - 10 July 1940 (Gouvernement Pétain) there were two Sous-secrétaires d'État. Schumann was Sous-secrétaire d'État aux Réfugiés (Under-Secretary of State for Refugees). Schuman was a parliamentarian who had voted to grant Pétain full powers.

On 25 August 1944, Paris was liberated. In September 1944, General Jean de Lattre de Tassigny, the commander of the French First Army, sought Schuman out to become a political advisor in the affairs of Alsace-Lorraine. The minister of war, Andre Diethelm, demanded shortly later that "this product of Vichy be immediately kicked out". Under the ordinance of 26 August 1944, Schuman was considered ineligible for public office, stricken with indignité nationale. On 24 July 1945, Schuman wrote to Charles de Gaulle to ask him to intervene. De Gaulle answered favourably, and on 15 September, Schuman regained his full civic rights, becoming able to again play an active role in French politics.

Schuman was Minister of Finance in 1946 and Prime Minister from 1947 to 1948. He assured parliamentary stability during a period of revolutionary strikes and attempted insurrection. In the last days of his first administration, his government proposed plans that later resulted in the Council of Europe and the European Community single market. Becoming Foreign Minister in 1948, he retained the post in different governments until early 1953.

When Schuman's first government proposed the creation of a European Assembly, it made the issue a governmental matter for Europe, not merely an academic discussion or the subject of private conferences, like The Hague Congress of the European Movements earlier in 1948. (Schuman's was one of the few governments to send active ministers.) The proposal saw life as the Council of Europe and was created within the tight schedule that Schuman had set. At the signing of its Statutes at St James's Palace, London, on 5 May 1949, the founding states agreed to define the borders of Europe based on the principles of human rights and fundamental freedoms that Schuman enunciated there. He also announced a coming supranational union for Europe that saw light as the European Coal and Steel Community (ECSC) and other such Communities within a union framework of common law and democracy:

We are carrying out a great experiment, the fulfilment of the same recurrent dream that for ten centuries has revisited the peoples of Europe: creating between them an organization putting an end to war and guaranteeing an eternal peace. The Roman church of the Middle Ages failed finally in its attempts that were inspired by humane and human preoccupations. Another idea, that of a world empire constituted under the auspices of German emperors was less disinterested; it already relied on the unacceptable pretensions of a 'Führertum' (domination by dictatorship) whose 'charms' we have all experienced.

Audacious minds, such as Dante, Erasmus, Abbé de St-Pierre, Rousseau, Kant and Proudhon, had created in the abstract the framework for systems that were both ingenious and generous. The title of one of these systems became the synonym of all that is impractical: Utopia, itself a work of genius, written by Thomas More, the Chancellor of Henry VIII, King of England.

The European spirit signifies being conscious of belonging to a cultural family and having a willingness to serve that community in the spirit of total mutuality, without any hidden motives of hegemony or the selfish exploitation of others. The 19th century saw feudal ideas being opposed and, with the rise of a national spirit, nationalities asserting themselves. Our century, that has witnessed the catastrophes resulting in the unending clash of nationalities and nationalisms, must attempt and succeed in reconciling nations in a supranational association. This would safeguard the diversities and aspirations of each nation while coordinating them in the same manner as the regions are coordinated within the unity of the nation.

— Robert Schuman, speaking in Strasbourg, 16 May 1949

As Foreign Minister, he announced in September 1948 and the next year, before the United Nations General Assembly, France's aim was to create a democratic organisation for Europe, which a post-Nazi and democratic Germany could join. In 1949 and 1950, he made a series of speeches in Europe and North America about creating a supranational European Community. This supranational structure, he said, would create lasting peace between Member States.

Our hope is that Germany will commit itself on a road that will allow it to find again its place in the community of free nations, commencing with that European Community of which the Council of Europe is a herald.

— Robert Schuman, speaking at the United Nations, 23 September 1949

On 9 May 1950, the principles of supranational democracy were announced in what has become known as the Schuman Declaration. The text was jointly prepared by Paul Reuter, the legal adviser at the Foreign Ministry and his aide Bernard Clappier and Jean Monnet and two of his team members, Pierre Uri and Étienne Hirsch. The French government agreed to the Schuman Declaration, which invited West Germany and all other European countries to manage their coal and steel industries jointly and democratically in Europe's first supranational Community, with its five fundamental institutions. On 18 April 1951, six founder members signed the Treaty of Paris, which formed the basis of the European Coal and Steel Community. They declared that date and the corresponding democratic, supranational principles to be the 'real foundation of Europe'. Three communities have been created so far. The Treaties of Rome (1957) created the Economic Community and the nuclear non-proliferation Community, Euratom. Together with the intergovernmental machinery of later treaties, they eventually evolved into the European Union. The Schuman Declaration was made on 9 May 1950 and since then, 9 May is designated to be Europe Day.

As Prime Minister and Foreign Minister Schuman was instrumental in the creation of the NATO (North Atlantic Treaty Organization). Schuman also signed the North Atlantic Treaty for France. The defensive principles of NATO's Article 5 were also repeated in the European Defence Community Treaty, which failed since the French National Assembly declined to vote its ratification. Schuman also supported an Atlantic Community.

== European politics ==
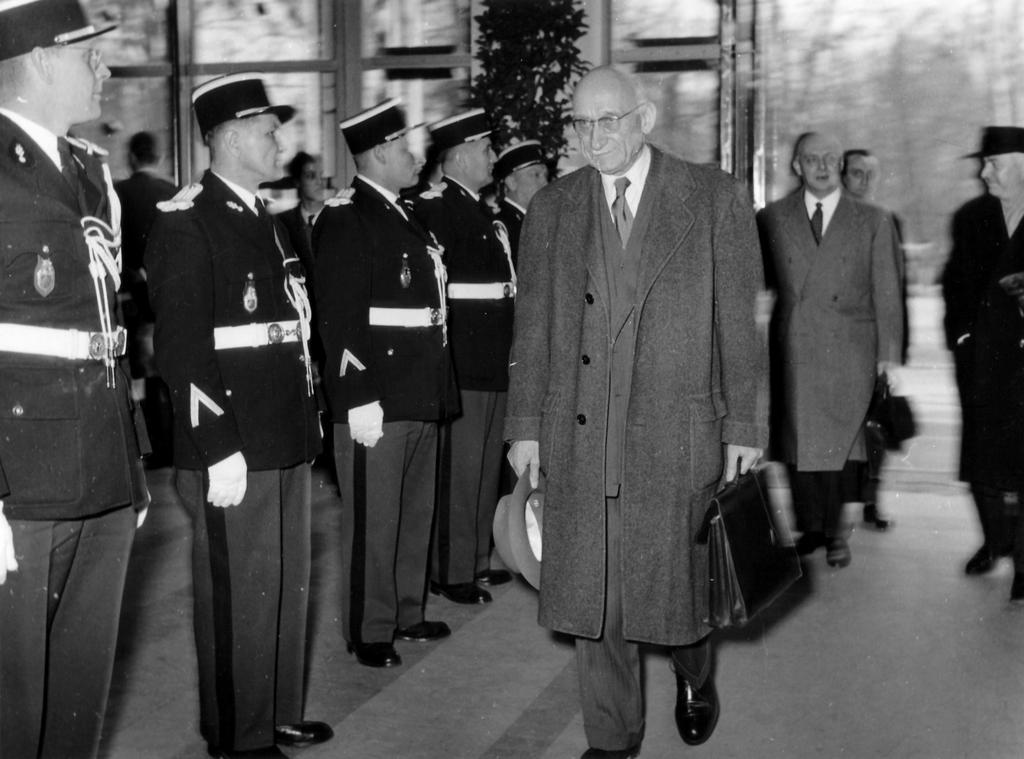
On 19 March 1958, the first meeting of the European Parliamentary Assembly was held in Strasbourg under the Presidency of Schuman.

Schuman later served as Minister of Justice before becoming the first President of the European Parliamentary Assembly (the successor to the Common Assembly), which bestowed on him by acclamation the title 'Father of Europe'. He is considered one of the founding fathers of the European Union. He presided over the European Movement from 1955 to 1961. In 1958, he received the Karlspreis, an Award by the German city of Aachen to people who contributed to the European idea and European peace, commemorating Charlemagne, the ruler of what is now both France and Germany, who lived in and is buried at Aachen. Schuman was also made a knight of the Order of Pius IX.

Schuman was intensely religious and a Bible scholar. He commended the writings of Pope Pius XII, who condemned both fascism and communism. He was an expert in medieval philosophy, especially the writings of Thomas Aquinas, and he thought highly of the philosopher Jacques Maritain, a contemporary.

== Beatification process ==
Schuman, a Catholic, demonstrated a monkish asceticism in his daily life and believed that democracy owed its existence to Christianity.

On 9 June 1990, the Bishop of Metz, Pierre Raffin, authorized the opening of the beatification process for Schuman. He was proclaimed a Servant of God in May 2004, with the conclusion of the diocesan process. The documents were sent to the Vatican, where the Congregation for the Causes of Saints is studying the dossier.

On 19 June 2021, in an audience granted to Cardinal Marcello Semeraro, Pope Francis authorized the Congregation for the Causes of Saints to promulgate the decree concerning the heroic virtues of Schuman, who can thus be defined as venerable.

== Memorials ==
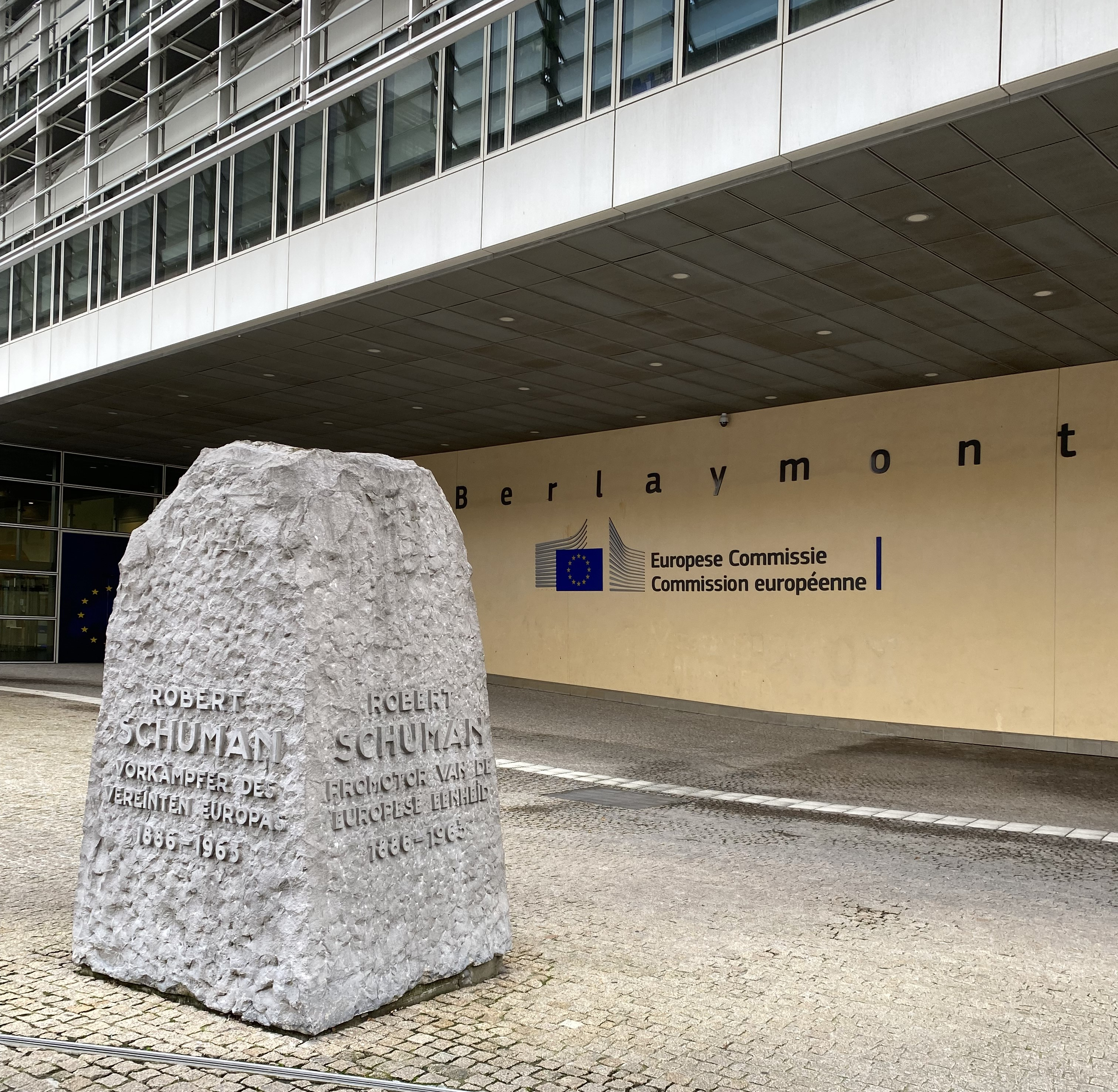
Monument to Schuman in front of the Berlaymont building, Brussels

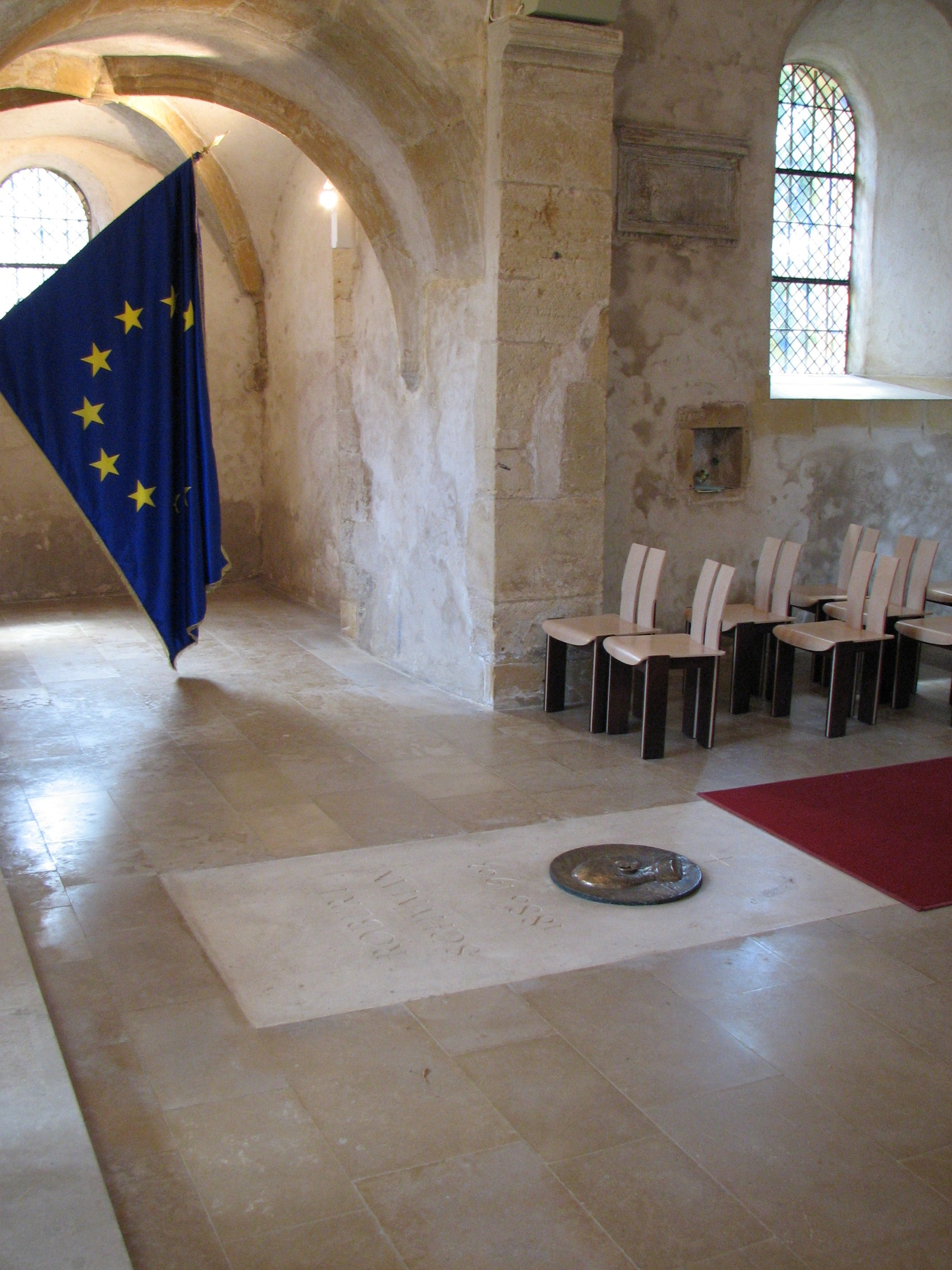
Grave of Schuman in Saint Quentin church, in Scy-Chazelles, near Metz, France

The Schuman District of Brussels (including a metro/railway station and a tunnel, as well as a square) is named in his honour. Around the square ("Schuman roundabout") can be found various European institutions, including the Berlaymont building which is the headquarters of the European Commission and has a monument to Schuman outside, as well as key European Parliament buildings. In the nearby Cinquantenaire Park, there is a bust of Schuman as a memorial to him. The European Parliament awards the Robert Schuman Scholarship for university graduates to complete a traineeship within the European Parliament and gain experience within the different committees, legislative processes and framework of the European Union.

A Social Science University named after him lies in Strasbourg (France) along with the Avenue du President Robert Schuman in that city's European Quarter. In Luxembourg there is a Rond Point Schuman, Boulevard Robert Schuman, a school called Lycée Robert Schuman and a Robert Schuman Building, of the European Parliament. In Esch-sur-Alzette, Luxembourg, there is a Rue Robert Schuman. The house where he was born was restored by the European Parliament and can be visited, as can his home in Scy-Chazelles just outside Metz.

In 1952 Schuman was awarded with an honorary doctorate in the Netherlands, at the Katholieke Economische Hogeschool Tilburg, at present Tilburg University.

In Aix-en-Provence, a town in Bouches-du-Rhone, France, there is an Avenue Robert Schuman, which houses the three university buildings of the town and in Ireland there is a building in the University of Limerick named the "Robert Schuman" building. In the United Kingdom, the assembly hall of the former European School at Culham, Oxfordshire (now the Europa School), is named after him.

The European University Institute in Florence, Italy, is home to the Robert Schuman Centre for Advanced Studies (RSCAS), focusing on "inter-disciplinary, comparative, and policy research on the major issues on the European integration process".

The Robert Schuman Institute in Budapest, Hungary, a European-level training institution of the European People's Party family is dedicated to promoting the idea of a united Europe, supporting and the process of democratic transformation in Central, Eastern and South Eastern Europe and the development of Christian Democratic and centre-right political parties also bears the name of Robert Schuman.

In 1965, the Robert Schuman Mittelschule in the St. Mang suburb of the city of Kempten in southern Bavaria was named after him.

== Governments ==
=== First ministry (24 November 1947 – 26 July 1948) ===
- Robert Schuman – President of the Council
- Georges Bidault – Minister of Foreign Affairs
- Pierre-Henri Teitgen – Minister of National Defense
- Jules Moch – Minister of the Interior
- René Mayer – Minister of Finance and Economic Affairs
- Robert Lacoste – Minister of Commerce and Industry
- Daniel Mayer – Minister of Labour and Social Security
- André Marie – Minister of Justice
- Marcel Edmond Naegelen – Minister of National Education
- François Mitterrand – Minister of Veterans and War Victims
- Pierre Pflimlin – Minister of Agriculture
- Paul Coste-Floret – Minister of Overseas France
- Christian Pineau – Minister of Public Works and Transport
- Germaine Poinso-Chapuis – Minister of Public Health and Population
- René Coty – Minister of Reconstruction and Town Planning

Changes:

- 12 February 1948 – Édouard Depreux succeeds Naegelen as Minister of National Education.

=== Second ministry (5–11 September 1948) ===
- Robert Schuman – President of the Council and Minister of Foreign Affairs
- René Mayer – Minister of National Defense
- André Marie – Vice President of the Council
- Jules Moch – Minister of the Interior
- Christian Pineau – Minister of Finance and Economic Affairs
- Robert Lacoste – Minister of Commerce and Industry
- Daniel Mayer – Minister of Labour and Social Security
- Robert Lecourt – Minister of Justice
- Tony Revillon – Minister of National Education
- Jules Catoire – Minister of Veterans and War Victims
- Pierre Pflimlin – Minister of Agriculture
- Paul Coste-Floret – Minister of Overseas France
- Henri Queuille – Minister of Public Works, Transport, and Tourism
- Pierre Schneiter – Minister of Public Health and Population
- René Coty – Minister of Reconstruction and Town Planning

== See also ==
- History of the European Coal and Steel Community (1945–57)

Political offices
Preceded by Paul Ramadier	Prime Minister of France; 1947–1948	Succeeded by André Marie
Preceded by Georges Bidault	Minister of Foreign Affairs; 1948–1953	Succeeded by Georges Bidault
Preceded by André Marie	Prime Minister of France; 1948	Succeeded by Henri Queuille
Preceded by Emmanuel Temple	Minister of Justice; 1955–1956	Succeeded by François Mitterrand
Preceded by Hans Furler	President of the European Parliament; 1958–1960	Succeeded by Hans Furler
Awards and achievements
Preceded by Paul-Henri Spaak	Laureate of the Charlemagne Prize; 1958	Succeeded by George Marshall
