= Pierre Pflimlin =

78th Prime Minister of France

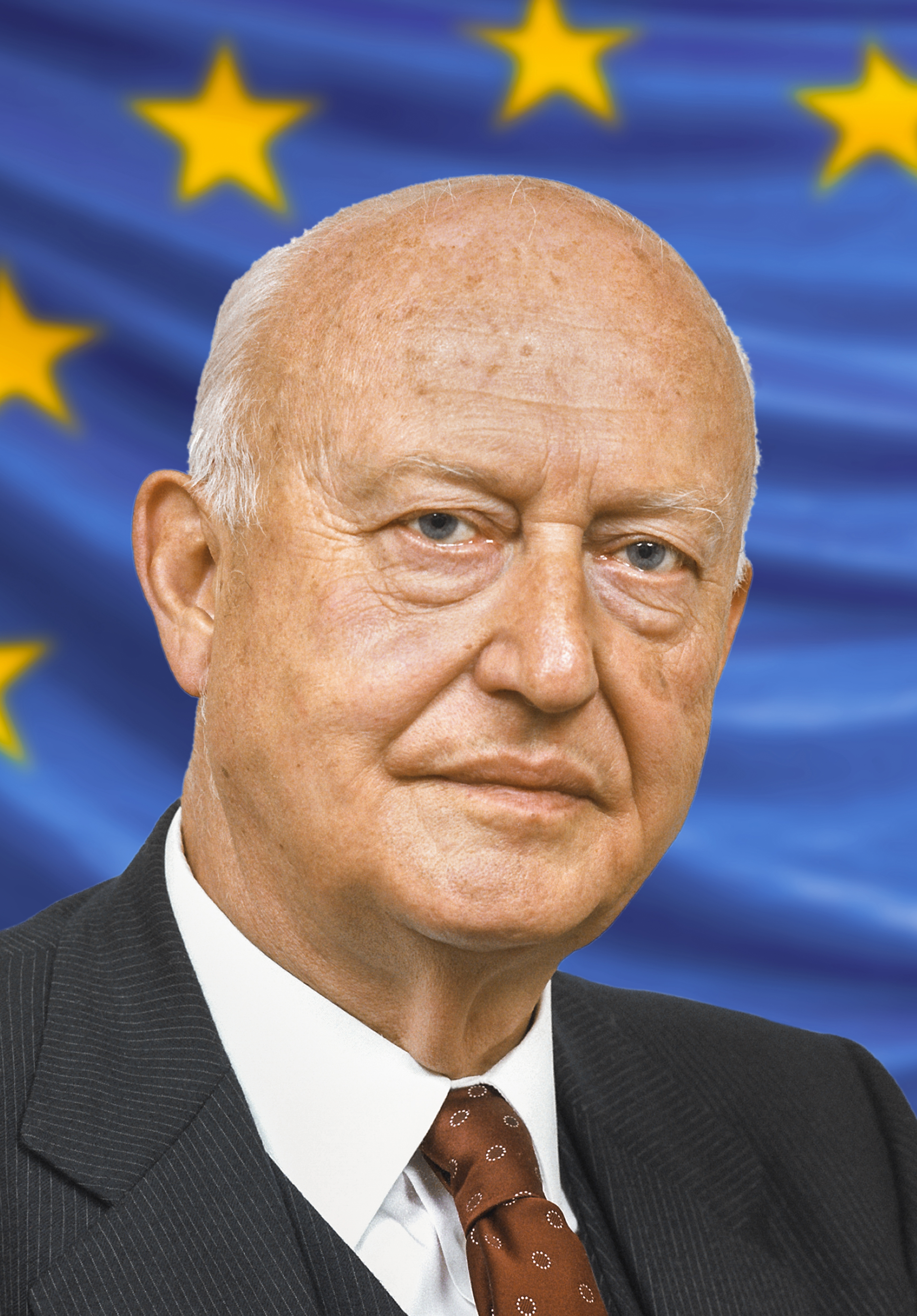
- Official portrait, 1984

Prime Minister of France
- In office 14 May 1958 – 1 June 1958
- President: René Coty
- Preceded by: Félix Gaillard
- Succeeded by: Charles de Gaulle

15th President of the European Parliament
- In office 24 July 1984 – 10 January 1987
- Preceded by: Piet Dankert
- Succeeded by: Charles Henry Plumb

Personal details
- Born: Pierre Eugène Jean Pflimlin; 5 February 1907 Roubaix, Nord-Pas-de-Calais, France
- Died: 27 June 2000 (aged 93) Strasbourg, Alsace, France
- Party: Popular Republican Movement (1944–1966); Democratic Centre (1966–1976); Centre of Social Democrats (1976–1995)
- Other political affiliations: Union for French Democracy (1978–1995)

Pierre Eugène Jean Pflimlin (French: [pjɛʁ flimlɛ̃]; 5 February 1907 – 27 June 2000) was a French Christian Democrat politician who served as the Prime Minister of the Fourth Republic for a few weeks in 1958, before being replaced by Charles de Gaulle during the crisis of that year.

== Life ==
Pflimlin was born in Roubaix in the Nord department. A lawyer and a member of the Christian democratic Popular Republican Movement (MRP), he was elected deputy of département Bas Rhin in 1945. With his personal roots in Alsace, Pflimlin numbered among his MRP party colleagues the Luxembourg-born Robert Schuman; for both, relations with Germany played an important role in their political thinking.

He held some governmental offices during the Fourth Republic, notably as Minister of Agriculture (1947–1949 and 1950–1951) and as Minister of Economy and Finance (1955–1956, 1957–1958).

=== Prime Minister of France ===
On 13 May 1958, the French National Assembly approved his nomination as Prime Minister. But the same day, riots took place in Algiers. The French generals in Algeria feared he would arrange for a negotiated solution with the Algerian nationalists giving them control of Algeria. They refused to recognize his cabinet. At this point, the leading politicians deserted him, including Guy Mollet, Vincent Auriol, and Antoine Pinay. The crisis culminated in a coup d'état in Algiers that was resolved with his resignation, thus facilitating Charles de Gaulle accession to the post of Prime Minister on 1 June.

=== Subsequent public offices ===
Pflimlin was Minister of State until 1959. As Minister of Cooperation in 1962, he resigned with the other MRP ministers in order to protest against the euro-scepticism of de Gaulle.

Pflimlin served as the first Catholic mayor of Strasbourg from 1959 to 1983.

He also was the President of the Parliamentary Assembly of the Council of Europe from 1963 to 1966 and President of the European Parliament from 1984 to 1987.

== Honours ==
The Pierre Pflimlin bridge over the Rhine south of Strasbourg, connecting France to Germany, is named after him and was opened in 2002.

== Government (14 May – 1 June 1958) ==
- Pierre Pflimlin – President of the Council
- Guy Mollet – Vice President of the Council
- René Pleven – Minister of Foreign Affairs
- Maurice Faure – Minister of the Interior
- Pierre de Chevigné – Minister of Armed Forces
- Edgar Faure – Minister of Finance, Economic Affairs, and Planning
- Paul Ribeyre – Minister of Commerce and Industry
- Paul Bacon – Minister of Labour and Social Security
- Robert Lecourt – Minister of Justice
- Jacques Bordeneuve – Minister of National Education
- Vincent Badie – Minister of Veterans and War Victims
- Roland Boscary-Monsservin – Minister of Agriculture
- André Colin – Minister of Overseas France
- Édouard Bonnefous – Minister of Public Works, Transport, and Tourism
- André Maroselli – Minister of Public Health and Population
- Pierre Garet – Minister of Reconstruction and Housing
- Édouard Corniglion-Molinier – Minister for the Sahara
- Félix Houphouët-Boigny – Minister of State

Changes:

- 17 May 1958 – Maurice Faure becomes Minister of European Institutions. Jules Moch succeeds Faure as Minister of the Interior. Albert Gazier enters the ministry as Minister of Information. Max Lejeune succeeds Houphouët-Boigny as Minister of State.

Political offices
Preceded by Marcel Roclore	Minister of Agriculture; 1947–1949	Succeeded by Gabriel Valay
Preceded by Gabriel Valay	Minister of Agriculture; 1950–1951	Succeeded by Paul Antier
Preceded by Jean-Marie Louvel	Minister of Commerce and External Commercial Relations; 1951–1952	Succeeded by Édouard Bonnefous
Preceded by —	Minister for the Council of Europe; 1952	Succeeded by —
Preceded by Louis Jacquinot	Minister of Overseas France; 1952–1953	Succeeded by Louis Jacquinot
Preceded by Robert Buron	Minister of Finance, Economic Affairs and Planning; 1955–1956	Succeeded by Robert Lacoste
Preceded by Félix Gaillard	Minister of Finance and Economic Affairs; 1957–1958	Succeeded by Edgar Faure
Preceded by Félix Gaillard	Prime Minister of France; 1958	Succeeded by Charles de Gaulle
Preceded by —	Minister of State; 1958–1959	Succeeded by —
Preceded by Jean Foyer	Minister of Cooperation; 1962	Succeeded by Georges Gorse
Preceded by Per Federspiel	President of the Parliamentary Assembly of the Council of Europe; 1963–1966	Succeeded by Geoffrey de Freitas
Preceded by Piet Dankert	President of the European Parliament; 1984–1987	Succeeded by The Lord Plumb
