= Centre républicain (1956) =

Republican Centre Centre républicain
- Founded: October 14, 1956
- Dissolved: May 13, 1977
- Split from: Radical Party
- Ideology: Republicanism; Social liberalism Conservatism
- Political position: Centre-right

The Republican Centre (Centre républicain, CR) was a former French political party, formed as a splinter group from the Radical Party's pro-French Algeria faction.

The party was established in October 1956 and led by Henri Queuille (president), André Morice (general secretary), André Marie, and Vincent Badie.

Initially named the Radical Socialist Party (Parti radical-socialiste), it was forced to change its name following a court decision. On January 29, 1958, it was renamed the Party of Democratic and Radical Socialist Left (Parti de la gauche démocratique et radicale-socialiste) and became the Republican Centre (Centre républicain) on September 13, 1958, when it merged with Bernard Lafay's party of the same name.

== History ==
The Republican Centre opposed the policies of Pierre Mendès France. André Morice was particularly vocal in favor of French Algeria and displayed strong anti-Gaullist sentiments. During the Radical Party's congress in Lyon in October 1956, twelve Radical deputies (including Henri Queuille, André Morice, and Émile Hugues) left the party after being outvoted on three key issues: the reinstatement of Edgar Faure following his exclusion from the Radical Party, the establishment of a collegial leadership structure (ending Pierre Mendès France's vice-presidency), and the Algerian question.

The party's electoral appeal was limited. In the 1962 legislative elections, five members of the Republican Centre were elected to the National Assembly: André Rossi, Francis Palmero, Jean-Paul de Rocca Serra, Pierre de Montesquiou, and Alexandre de Fraissinette.

From 1973, the Republican Centre became part of the Reformist Movement before rejoining the Valoisian Radical Party in May 1977.
