= Azerat =

- Commune
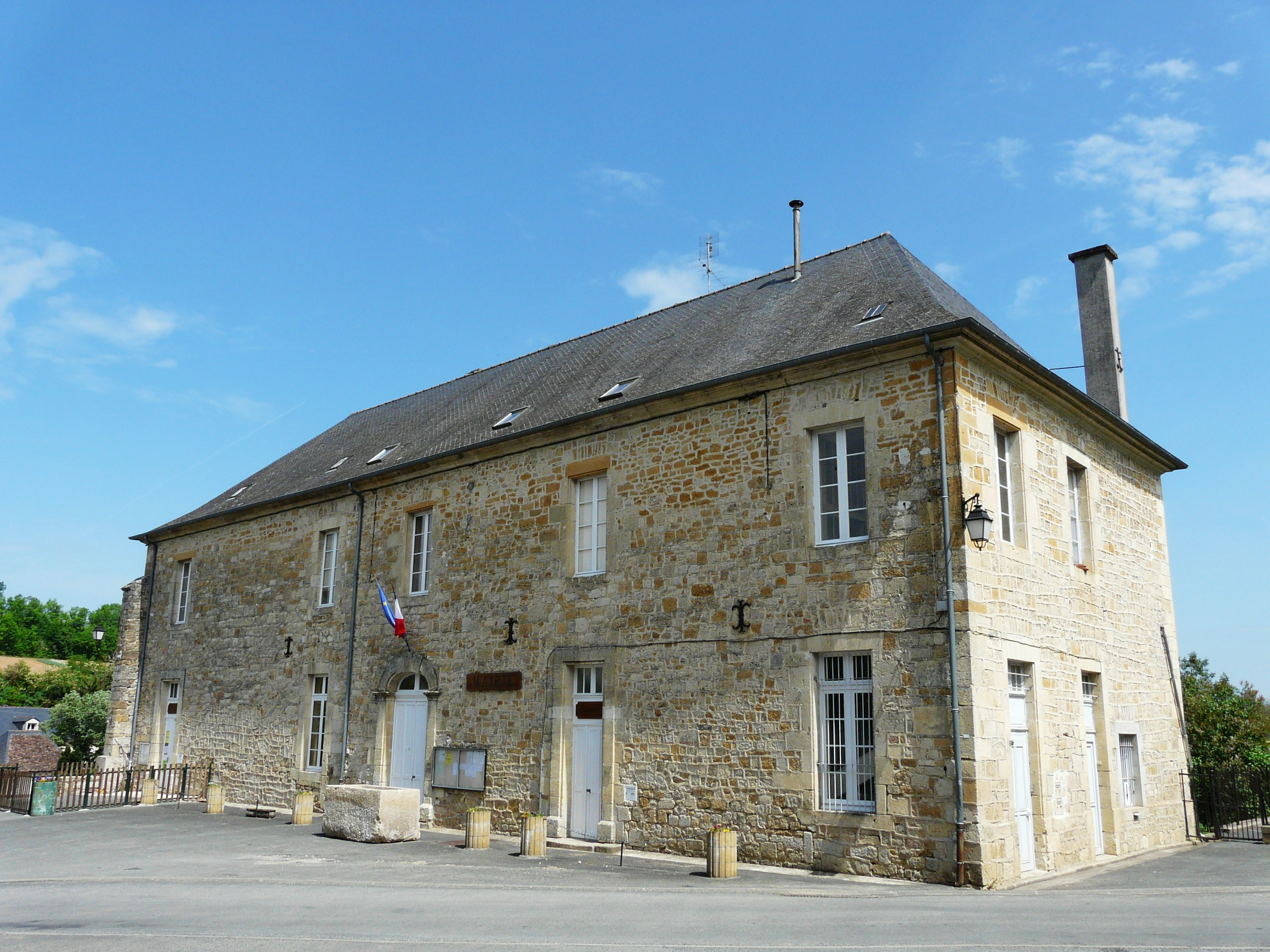
- The town hall in Azerat
- Location of Azerat
- Location within France Location within Nouvelle-Aquitaine
- Coordinates: 45°09′03″N 1°07′27″E
- Country: France
- Region: Nouvelle-Aquitaine
- Department: Dordogne
- Arrondissement: Sarlat-la-Canéda
- Canton: Haut-Périgord Noir
- Intercommunality: CC Terrassonnais Périgord Noir Thenon Hautefort

Government
  - Mayor (2020–2026): Josiane Léviski
- Area^{1}: 20.05 km^{2} (7.74 sq mi)
- Highest elevation: 317 m (1,040 ft)
- Lowest elevation: 128 m (420 ft)
- Population (2023): 463
  - Density: 23.1/km^{2} (59.8/sq mi)
- Time zone: UTC+01:00 (CET)
  - Summer (DST): UTC+02:00 (CEST)
- INSEE/Postal code: 24019 /24210
- ^{1} French Land Register data, which excludes lakes, ponds, glaciers > 1 km^{2} (0.386 sq mi or 247 acres) and river estuaries.

Azerat (French pronunciation: [azʁa]; Occitan: Aserat) is a commune in the Dordogne department in Nouvelle-Aquitaine in southwestern France. The A89 motorway passes by the village.

== Population ==
Historical population
Year	Pop.	±% p.a.
1968	495	—
1975	454	−1.23%
1982	419	−1.14%
1990	407	−0.36%
1999	409	+0.05%
2007	423	+0.42%
2012	432	+0.42%
2017	442	+0.46%
2023	463	+0.78%
Source: INSEE

== Personalities ==
- Robert Lacoste
- Maurice Faure
- Outside the chapel is the house of the socialist Suzanne Lacore, first female undersecretary of state in the first government of Léon Blum and former schoolteacher.

== See also ==
- Communes of the Dordogne department
