= Jules Moch (French Army officer) =

Jules Moch (August 14, 1829 at Sarrelouis – August 8, 1881 in Paris) was a French officer. He was a colonel of the 130th. Regiment of Infantry.

On the completion of his classical studies at the lycée of Metz, he then entered the military school of Saint-Cyr in 1849, and was appointed sublieutenant of infantry in 1851.

From 1855-56, Moch took part in the campaigns in the Crimea and from 1860-61 in Syria, as well as the occupation of Rome between 1867-67. In the Franco-Prussian War, 1870-71 he was given command of the 3rd. Regiment battalion, for which he had the mournful distinction of firing the last shots of the war, and took an honorable part of in his capture and escape during the battle of Sedan in September 1870

During the interval between the Crimean and Syrian campaigns, he was tutor-instructor at the school of Saint-Cyr. Later he would return as an examiner.

After the conclusion of the Franco-Prussian War, he would have published in various military journals a number of articles on the reorganization of the army. He was one of the co-founders and vice-president of the assembly of officers (known as the "Military Club"), many of French Jewish origin rising through the ranks of the French Army.

He was also the Father of French military officer, Gaston Moch and Grandfather of French statesman, Jules S. Moch.
