= Jules Moch =

French politician (1893–1985)

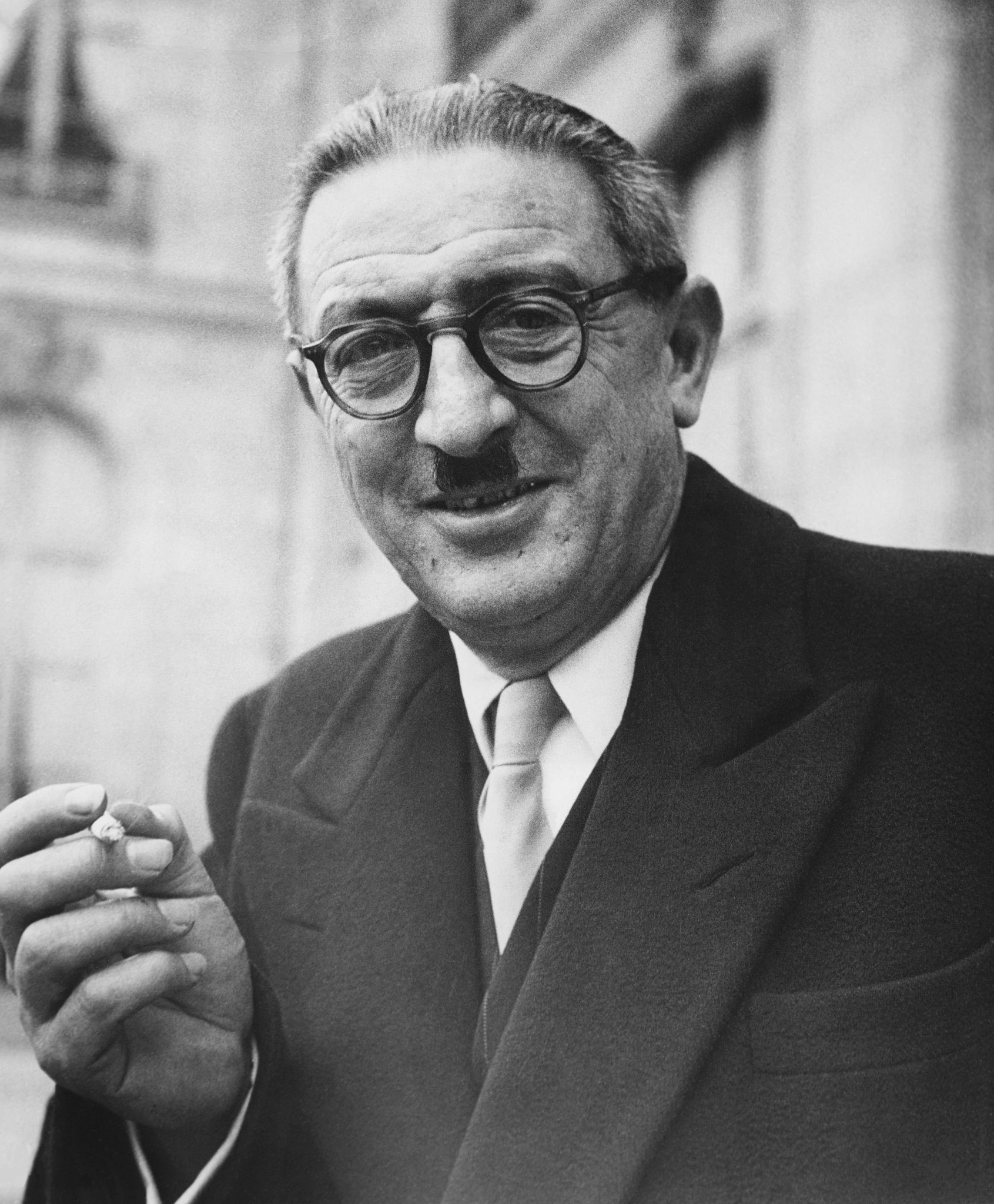
- Jules Moch in 1950.

Minister of the Interior
- In office 17 May 1958 – 1 June 1958
- President: René Coty
- Preceded by: Maurice Faure
- Succeeded by: Émile Pelletier
- In office 24 November 1947 – 7 February 1950
- President: Vincent Auriol
- Preceded by: Édouard Depreux
- Succeeded by: Henri Queuille

Minister of National Defence
- In office 12 July 1950 – 11 August 1951
- President: Vincent Auriol
- Preceded by: René Pleven
- Succeeded by: Georges Bidault

Minister of Public Works, Transport and Reconstruction
- In office 21 November 1945 – 24 November 1947
- President: Charles de Gaulle; Félix Gouin; Georges Bidault; Léon Blum; Paul Ramadier
- Preceded by: René Mayer
- Succeeded by: Christian Pineau

Minister of Public Works and Transport
- In office 13 March 1938 – 8 April 1938
- President: Léon Blum
- Preceded by: Henri Queuille
- Succeeded by: Ludovic-Oscar Frossard

Personal details
- Born: Jules Salvador Moch; 15 March 1893 Paris, Île-de-France, French Third Republic
- Died: 1 August 1985 (aged 92) Cabris, Alpes-Maritimes, France
- Party: SFIO (until 1969); PS (1969–1975)
- Occupation: Politician

Jules Salvador Moch (15 March 1893 – 1 August 1985) was a French politician.

== Biography ==
Moch was born into a renowned French Jewish military family, the son of Captain Gaston Moch and Rébecca Alice Pontremoli. His grandfather was Colonel Jules Moch. His upbringing occurred during a growing socialist movement in France. He was in Polytechnique along with Alfred Dreyfus. As an engineer (polytechnicien) who took part in the X-Crise Group, he was a socialist member of Parliament for Drôme and then Hérault from 1928 to 1936 and from 1937 to 1940. He was Under-secretary of State in prime minister Léon Blum's office (1937) and became Minister of Public Works in 1938.

During World War II Moch was critical of the Vichy French government and was jailed but later was released. He joined and helped organise the Paris underground. He also helped other French Resistance activities in France. When the Free French Naval Forces was organized, he rallied to de Gaulle in 1942 and participated in the Invasion of Normandy toward the Free French Liberation of France with the Allies.

After World War II, Moch was a member of the Consultative Assembly (1944) and of the two Constituent National Assemblies (1945–1946) and then of the National Assembly (1946–1958 and 1962–1967). He was a Cabinet Minister eight times during the Fourth Republic, heading the Ministries of Public works and Transportation (1945–1947), Interior (1947–1950), and Defence (1950–1951). As Transport Minister, he contributed to the rebuilding of railways, ports, roads, aviation, and the Navy. As Interior Minister, he had to deal with the communist-inspired great strikes in November 1947 and showed great firmness. In the Defence Ministry, he contributed to the modernisation of the army, organised French participation in the Korean War and the implementation of NATO. He also suggested and participated in the forming of the Baghdad Pact for the Middle East. He fought the Gaullist and Communist Parties during the Fourth Republic and was one of the leaders of the Troisième Force.

Moch was deputy prime minister from 1949 to 1950, and France's delegate at the UN Disarmament Commission from 1951 to 1960. As rapporteur of the Foreign Affairs Committee, he opposed the European Community of Defence, which was defeated by the National Assembly in 1954. His last ministerial post was in Pierre Pflimlin's government in May 1958 where he played an important role in the May 1958 crisis of French Algeria, as Interior Minister. He left the Socialist Party in 1975.

He was married to Germaine Picard, one of the first woman lawyers of France. She was also an active advocate of the women's rights movement in France and Europe.

Though other noted individuals lay claim, it is alleged that the name Cold War was officially "coined" after a speech he made in 1948 over his concern on the growing rift that developed between the Allies of Western Europe and the Warsaw Pact Forces of Eastern Europe.

== Publications ==
He has published:

- Confrontations (Doctrines – Déviations – Expériences – Espérances), Gallimard 1952
- Yougoslavie, terre d'expérience, éd. du Rocher, Monaco, 1953
- Histoire du réarmement allemand depuis 1950, Robert Laffont, 1954
- Alerte, le problème crucial de la Communauté Européenne de défense, Robert Laffont
- La folie des hommes (about the atomic bomb), Robert Laffont, 1954
- En 1961, Paix en Algérie, Robert Laffont
- Non à la force de frappe, Robert Laffont, 1963
- Le Front Populaire, Perrin 1971
- Rencontre avec Charles de Gaulle, 1971
- Une si longue vie, témoignages, Robert Laffont, 1976
- Le communisme jamais, Plon 1978

=== Biography ===
- Eric Méchoulan has written a book: Jules Moch un socialiste dérangeant, published by Bruylant.
- Autobiography of Jules Moch: "Jules Moch" une si longue vie, published by Robert Laffont 1976, Paris

== See also ==
- List of Interior Ministers of France

Political offices
Preceded by Édouard Depreux	Minister of the Interior; 1947–1950	Succeeded by Henri Queuille
Preceded by Maurice Faure	Minister of the Interior; 1958	Succeeded by Émile Pelletier
