= Ministry of Information (France) =

Former government ministry of France

- Ministère de l'information

Ministry overview
- Formed: 13 March 1938
- Dissolved: 28 May 1974
- Minister responsible: Minister of Information

The Ministry of Information (French: Ministère de l'information) was the Government of France department responsible for propaganda from its creation in 1938 to its suppression in 1974. It was headed by the Minister of Information, occasionally taking various titles.
