= Saint Quentin Church =

12th-century fortified church in Scy-Chazelles, France

Coordinates: 49°6′40″N 6°6′41″E

Saint Quentin Church (French: Église Saint-Quentin) is a small 12th-century fortified church in Scy-Chazelles, in the suburbs of Metz (Lorraine, France). It is the burial place of Robert Schuman, one of the founders of the European Union.

== Photos ==
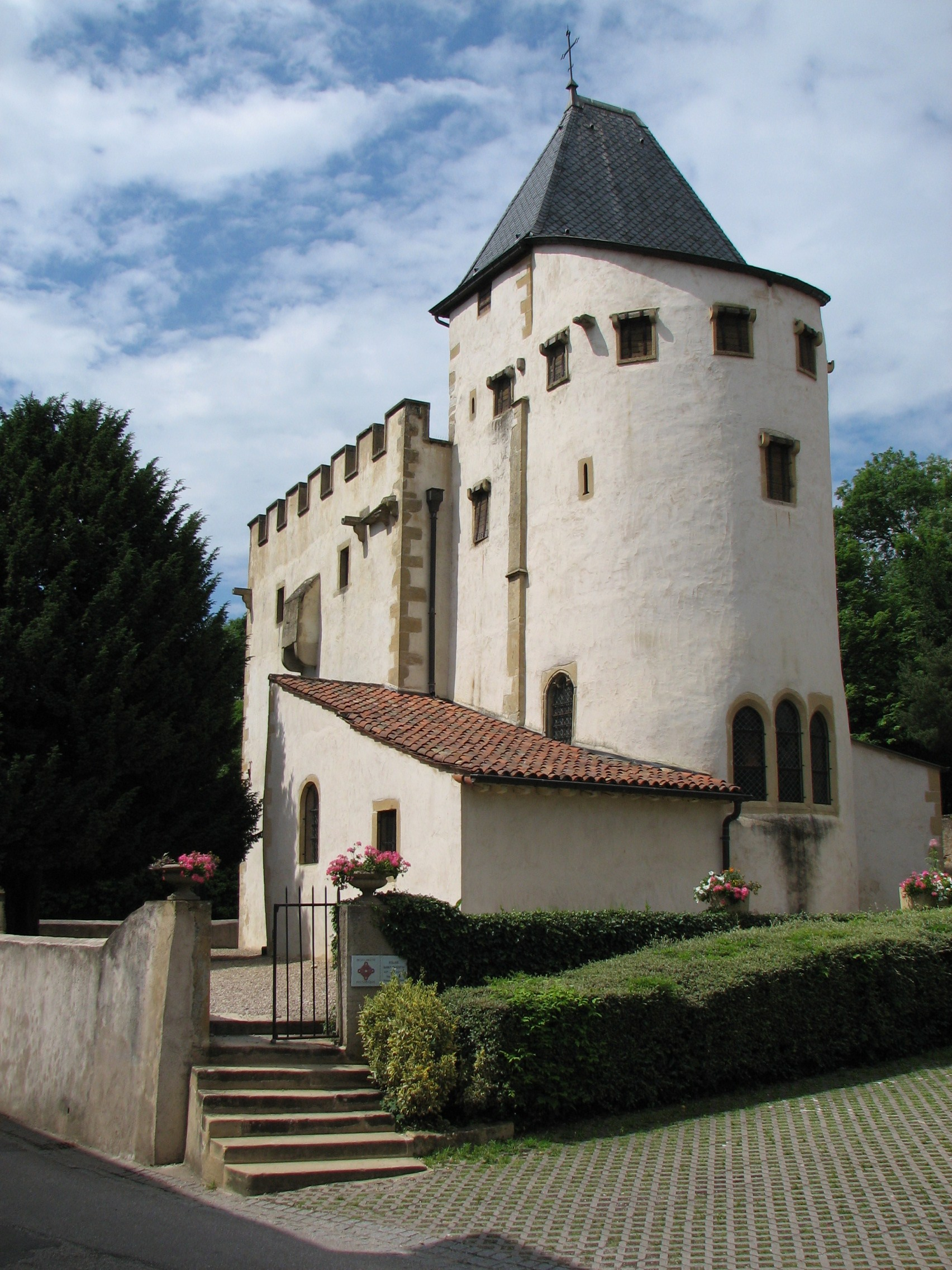
Saint-Quentin church

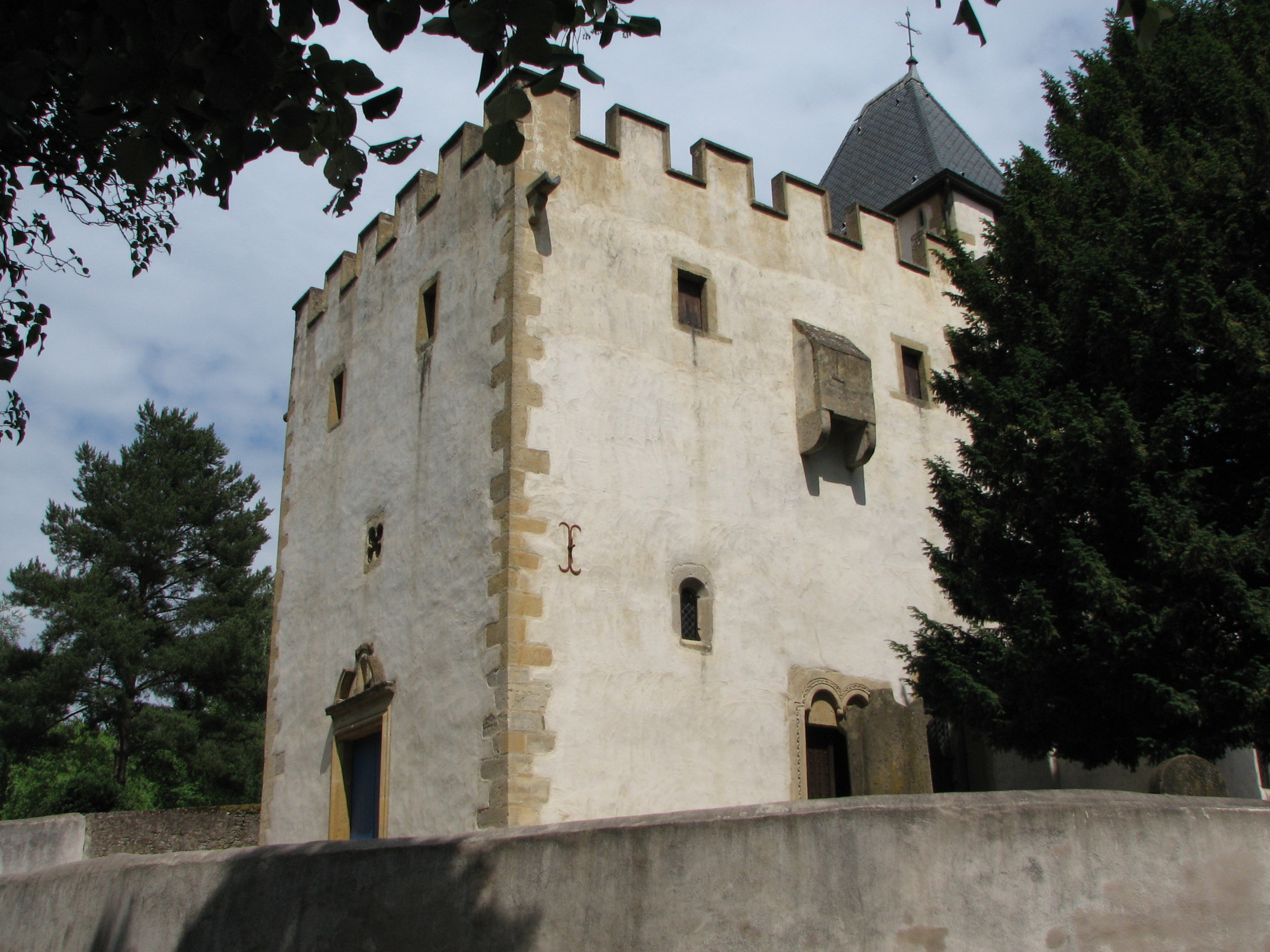
South and east faces of the building.

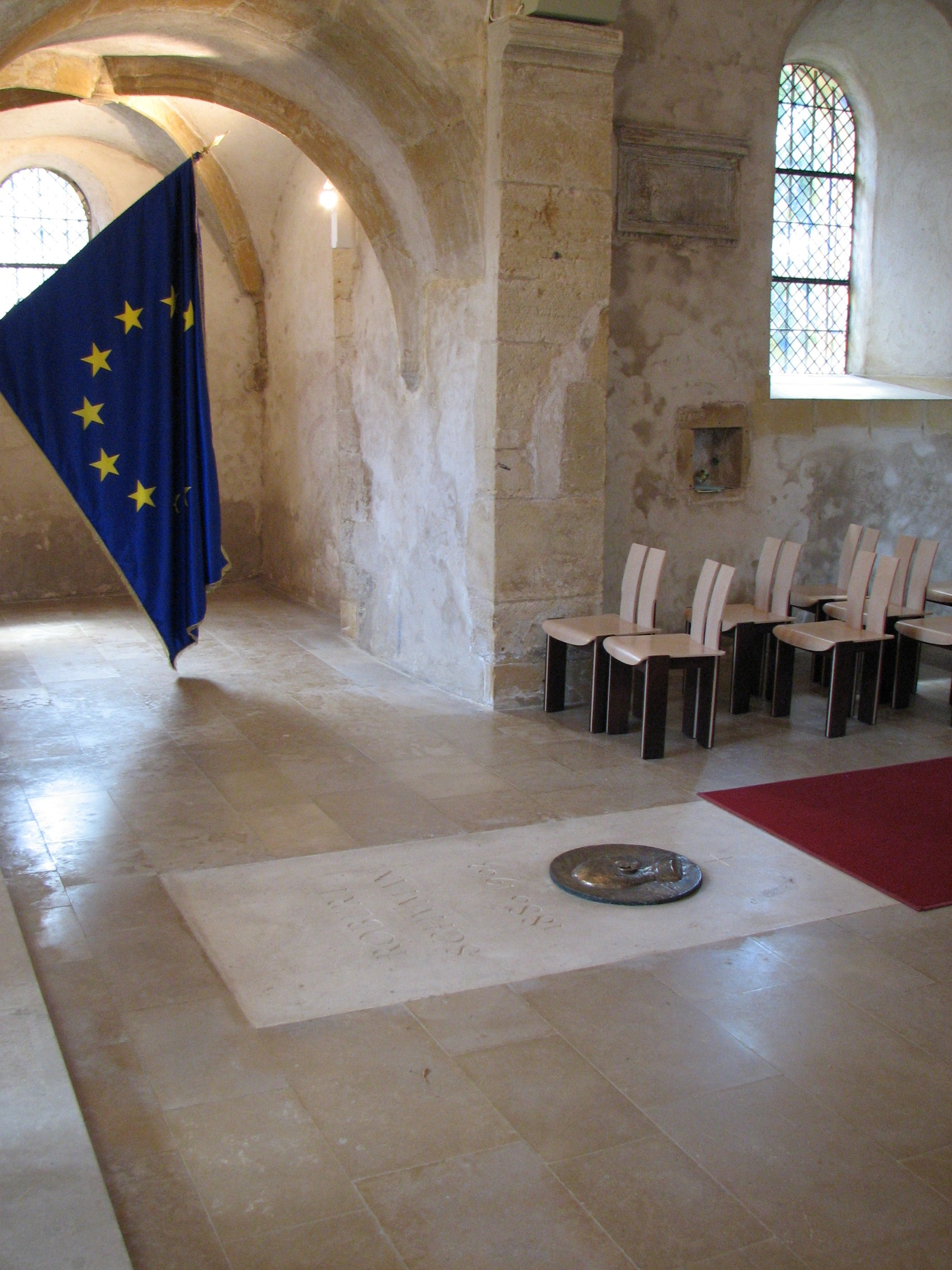
Robert Schuman's grave

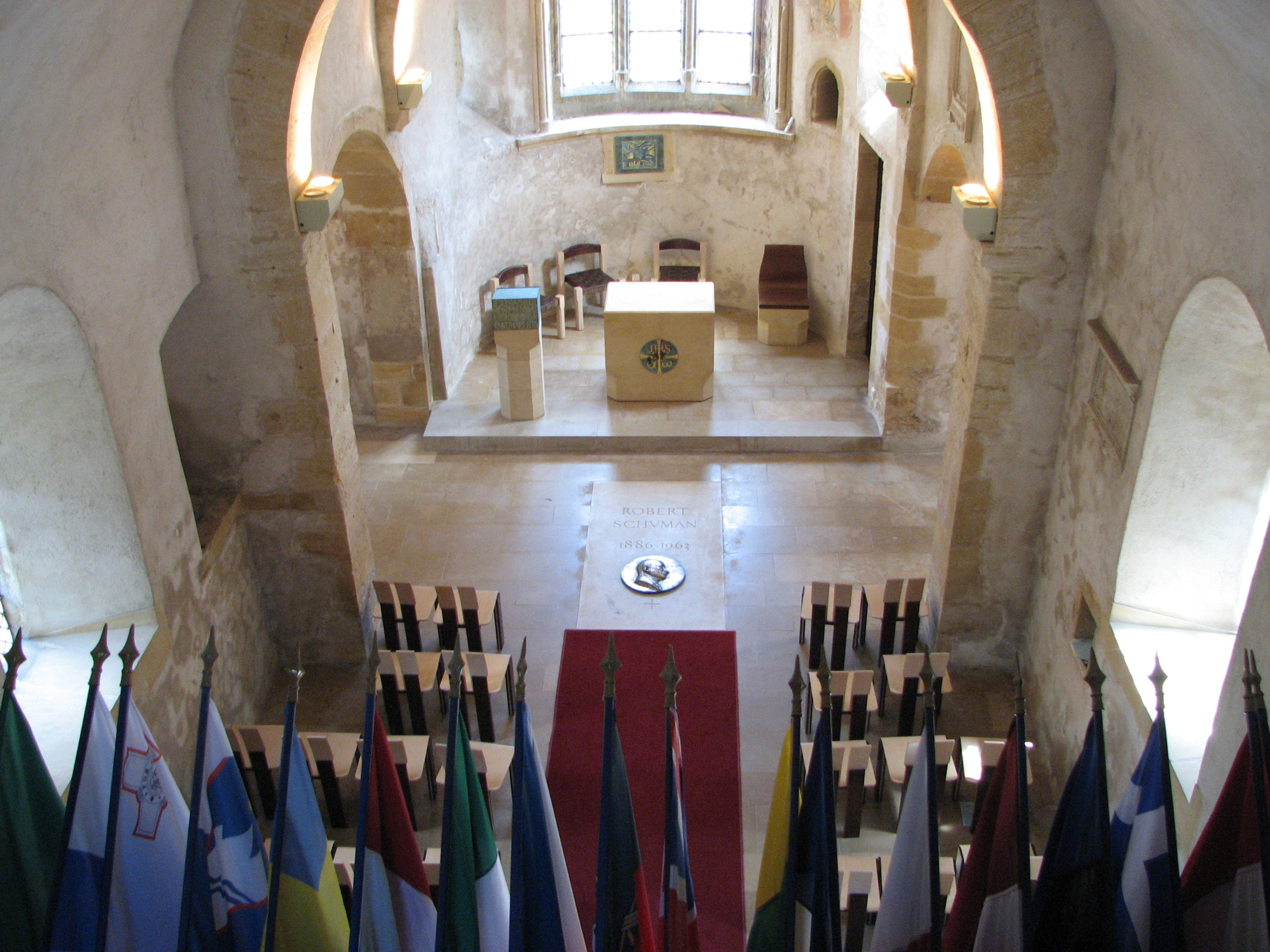
Inside of the church with the Robert Schuman grave and all the flags of the European Union countries
