= Félix Gaillard =

French politician (1919-1970

Prime Minister of France
- In office 6 November 1957 – 14 May 1958
- President: René Coty
- Preceded by: Maurice Bourgès-Maunoury
- Succeeded by: Pierre Pflimlin

Personal details
- Born: 5 November 1919; Paris, France
- Died: 10 July 1970 (aged 50) near Jersey
- Political party: Radical

Félix Gaillard d'Aimé (French: [feliks ɡajaʁ]; 5 November 1919 – 10 July 1970) was a French Radical politician who served as Prime Minister under the Fourth Republic from 1957 to 1958. He was the youngest head of a French government since Napoleon.

== Career ==
A senior civil servant in the Inland Revenue Service, Gaillard joined the Resistance and served on its Finance committee. As a member of the Radical Party, he was elected deputy of Charente département in 1946. During the Fourth Republic, he held a number of governmental offices, notably as Minister of Economy and Finance in 1957.

== Prime minister ==
He became Prime Minister in 1957, but, not unusually for the French Fourth Republic; his term of office lasted only a few months. Gaillard was defeated in a vote of no confidence by the French National Assembly, in March 1958, after the bombing of Sakiet-Sidi-Youssef, a Tunisian village.

== Later political career ==
President of the Radical Party from 1958 to 1961, he advocated an alliance of the center-left and the center-right parties. He represented a generation of young politicians whose careers were blighted by the advent of the Fifth Republic.

== Death ==
Gaillard was last seen alive on 9 July 1970, when he and three passengers boarded his yacht, the Marie Grillon and departed the island of Jersey to return to the French mainland after a brief stay. The next day, bits of the wreckage of the yacht were found at the Minquiers reefs, along with the bodies of the two passengers. Gaillard's body was found, along with that of another passenger, floating in the English Channel on 12 July.

== Gaillard's Ministry, 6 November 1957 – 14 May 1958 ==
- Félix Gaillard – President of the Council
- Christian Pineau – Minister of Foreign Affairs
- Jacques Chaban-Delmas – Minister of National Defense and Armed Forces
- Maurice Bourgès-Maunoury – Minister of the Interior
- Pierre Pflimlin – Minister of Finance, Economic Affairs, and Planning
- Paul Ribeyre – Minister of Commerce and Industry
- Paul Bacon – Minister of Labour and Social Security
- Robert Lecourt – Minister of Justice
- René Billères – Minister of National Education, Youth, and Sports
- Antoine Quinson – Minister of Veterans and War Victims
- Roland Boscary-Monsservin – Minister of Agriculture
- Gérard Jaquet – Minister of Overseas France
- Édouard Bonnefous – Minister of Public Works, Transport, and Tourism
- Félix Houphouët-Boigny – Minister of Public Health and Population
- Pierre Garet – Minister of Reconstruction and Housing
- Max Lejeune – Minister for the Sahara

Political offices
Preceded by Paul Ramadier	Minister of Finance and Economic Affairs; 1957	Succeeded by Pierre Pflimlin
Preceded by Maurice Bourgès-Maunoury	Prime Minister of France; 1957–1958	Succeeded by Pierre Pflimlin
Party political offices
Preceded by Édouard Daladier	President of the Radical Party; 1958–1961	Succeeded by Maurice Faure
