= Gaston Moch =

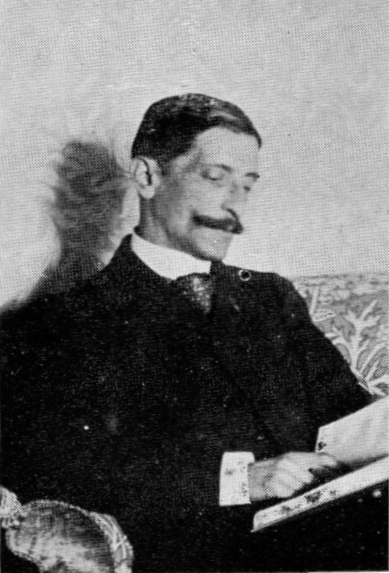
Gaston Moch.

Gaston Moch (6 March 1859 – 3 July 1935) was a French Esperantist. He was the secretary of the Esperantist Centra Oficejo and a member of the Lingva Komitato.

Moch was born in Saint-Cyr-l'École, Yvelines. He was the son of French Jewish Military officer, Col. Jules Moch, co-founder of "The Club Millitaire" during the time when French Jews were entering the upper ranks of the French Army in the 19th century. During World War I, Gaston would reach the rank of captain. He was also a supportive advocate toward the later release of his former classmate Capt. Alfred Dreyfus in the Dreyfus Affair trial, in which Dreyfus was falsely accused and sentenced for treasonous acts, aggravated by growing antisemitism in France. Coincidentally, Moch and Dreyfus were both born and died in the same year.

Moch was married to Alice Rébecca Pontremoli (1865-1943). The dowry of his wife, who was from a wealthy Parisian Jewish family, allowed him to quit the army and pursue his academic and civil passions. He helped found the Ligue des Droits de l'Homme, which had 200,000 members by the turn of the century. In 1905, he and William T. Stearn founded the first Esperanto society in the United Kingdom.

Moch, along with a small group of other French pacifists, purchased L'Indépendance Belge, a prominent daily newspaper from Brussels.

He was also the father of French Minister-Statesman, Jules S. Moch.
