= Maurice Bourgès-Maunoury =

French Prime Minister (1914–1993)

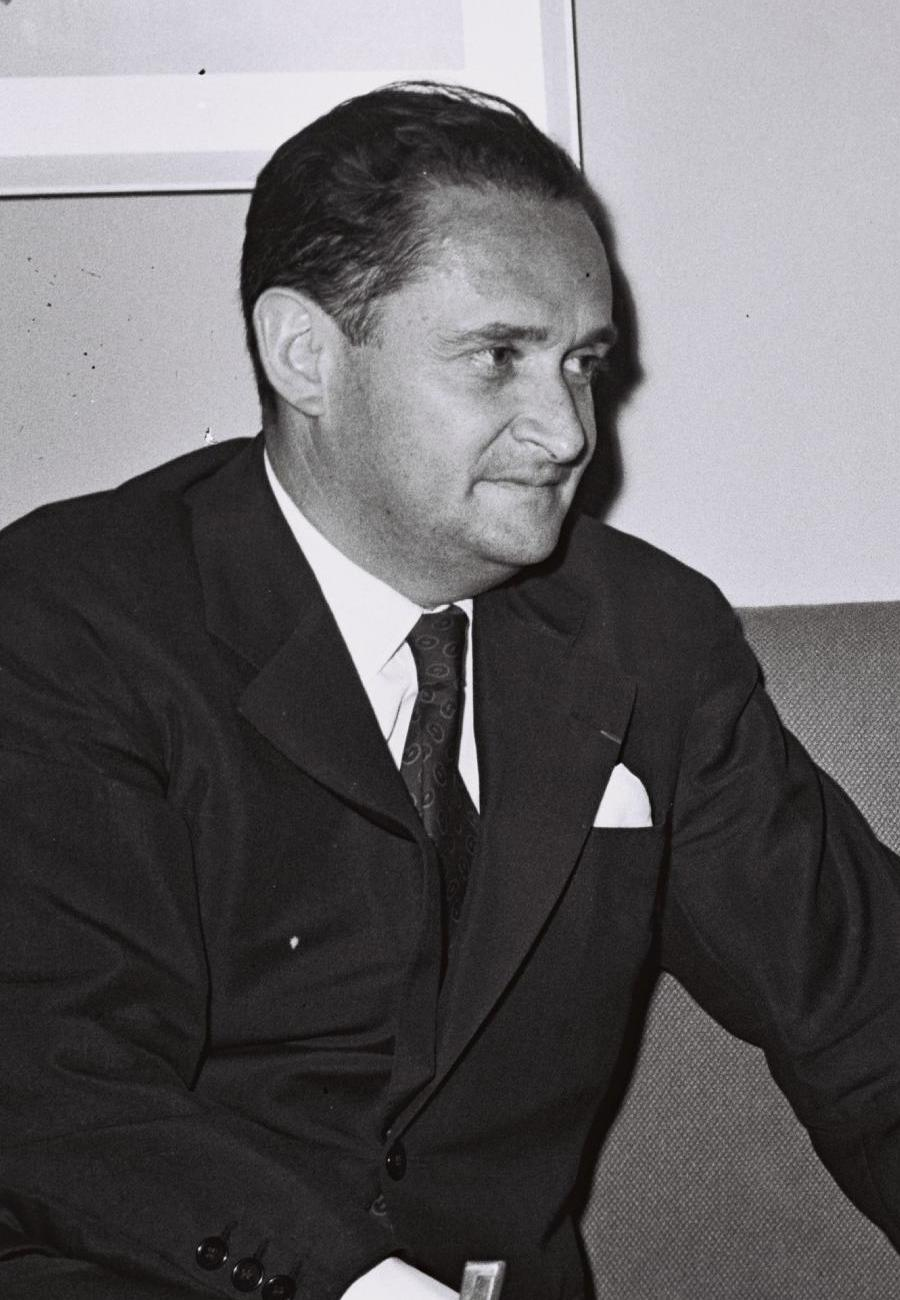
- Maurice Bourgès-Maunoury, in 1958

Prime Minister of France (Note: the term "President of the Council of Ministers of France" was naming of head of government of France in the Third Republic and Fourth Republic periods, naming "Prime Minister of France" is used since Fifth Republic periods, in fact, naming of Prime Minister of France is used in several political regimes era by the foreign press)
- In office 13 June 1957 – 6 November 1957
- President: René Coty
- Preceded by: Guy Mollet
- Succeeded by: Félix Gaillard

Minister of the Interior
- In office 6 November 1957 – 15 April 1958
- President: René Coty
- Preceded by: Jean Gilbert-Jules
- Succeeded by: Maurice Faure

Minister of National Defence
- In office 1 February 1956 – 21 May 1957
- President: René Coty
- Preceded by: Pierre Billotte
- Succeeded by: André Morice

Member of the French National Assembly
- In office 11 June 1946 – 5 December 1958
- Constituency: Haute-Garonne

Personal details
- Born: Maurice Jean-Marie Bourgès; 19 August 1914 Luisant, Eure-et-Loir, France
- Died: 10 February 1993 (aged 78) 8th arrondissement of Paris, France
- Party: Radical Party
- Education: École Polytechnique; University of Paris; Sciences Po
- Profession: Military officer Civil servant Business executive

Maurice Bourgès-Maunoury (French: [mɔʁis buʁʒ monuʁi]; 19 August 1914 – 10 February 1993) was a French statesman and a member of the Companions of the Liberation. He served as President of the Council of Ministers (Prime Minister) under the Fourth French Republic.

== Early life and education ==
Maurice Jean-Marie Bourgès was born in Luisant, Eure-et-Loir. His father, Georges Bourgès, was a maritime engineering executive, and his mother, Geneviève Maunoury, belonged to a family with a notable political legacy. His maternal grandfather, Maurice Maunoury, was a minister during the French Third Republic, and his great-grandfather, Pol Maunoury, served as a deputy for Eure-et-Loir.

Bourgès-Maunoury attended the prestigious École Polytechnique (class of 1935), obtained a law degree, and graduated from Sciences Po.

== Political career ==
=== Early political engagement ===
Before World War II, Bourgès-Maunoury aligned with the Young Turk faction within the Radical Socialist Party, which represented the left wing of the party. From 1935 to 1940, he served as an artillery officer.

=== Role in the Resistance ===
During the war, Bourgès-Maunoury joined the French Resistance, working with the X-Libre network alongside figures like Jacques Chaban-Delmas and Félix Gaillard. On 2 September 1944, he was wounded during a strafing attack on his train in Broye. For his service, he was awarded the Companion of the Liberation by General Charles de Gaulle. In 1945, he was appointed Commissioner of the Republic in Bordeaux.

=== Ministerial roles ===
Bourgès-Maunoury held numerous government positions during the Fourth Republic. These included Minister of National Defence (1956–1957), where he supported a military solution to the Algerian War and opposed the withdrawal from Port Said following the Suez Crisis. As Minister of the Interior (1957–1958), he faced significant unrest, including protests by police officers outside the Palais Bourbon in March 1958. He signed the authorization of chemical weapons in the Algerian War.

As President of the Council of Ministers from June to November 1957, Bourgès-Maunoury secured the ratification of the Treaty of Rome, establishing the European Economic Community.

=== Cooperation with Israel ===
Bourgès-Maunoury played a key role in fostering cooperation between France and Israel during the 1950s. Working with Shimon Peres, then Director-General of Israel's Ministry of Defense, he facilitated the acquisition of the first Dimona nuclear reactor and military equipment, including the Dassault Mystère IV fighter jet.

=== Opposition to the Fifth Republic ===
Bourgès-Maunoury opposed the return of General de Gaulle to power and campaigned against the Constitution of the Fifth Republic. He unsuccessfully ran for the National Assembly for Landes in 1973.

== Personal life ==
Bourgès-Maunoury married twice. His first marriage to Madeleine Giraud resulted in two sons, Jacques and Marc. His second marriage to Jacqueline Lacoste produced a daughter, Florence-Emmanuelle.

== Honors and distinctions ==
- Chevalier of the Légion d'honneur
- Companion of the Liberation (decree of 12 September 1944)
- Croix de Guerre 1939–1945 (with two citations)
- Médaille de la Résistance with rosette (3 August 1946)
- Distinguished Service Order (UK)
- Legion of Merit (USA)
