= Scy-Chazelles =

- Commune
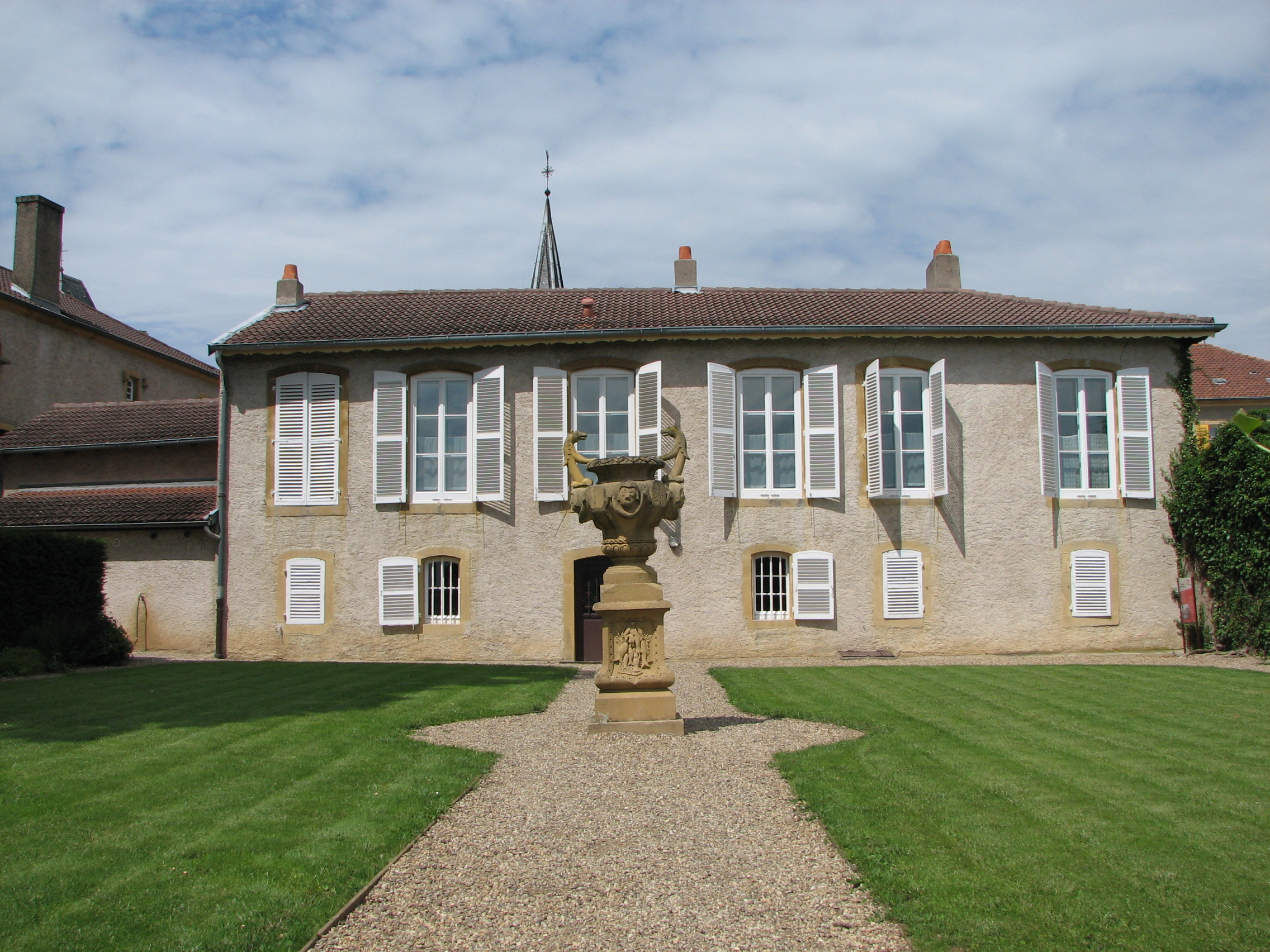
- House of Robert Schuman in Scy-Chazelles

- Coat of arms
- Location of Scy-Chazelles
- Location within France Location within Grand Est
- Coordinates: 49°06′52″N 6°06′54″E
- Country: France
- Region: Grand Est
- Department: Moselle
- Arrondissement: Metz
- Canton: Montigny-lès-Metz
- Intercommunality: Metz Métropole

Government
  - Mayor (2020–2026): Frédéric Navrot
- Area^{1}: 4.52 km^{2} (1.75 sq mi)
- Elevation: 300 m (980 ft)
- Highest elevation: 360 m (1,180 ft)
- Lowest elevation: 165 m (541 ft)
- Population (2023): 2,753
  - Density: 609/km^{2} (1,580/sq mi)
- Time zone: UTC+01:00 (CET)
  - Summer (DST): UTC+02:00 (CEST)
- INSEE/Postal code: 57642 /57160
- ^{1} French Land Register data, which excludes lakes, ponds, glaciers > 1 km^{2} (0.386 sq mi or 247 acres) and river estuaries.

Scy-Chazelles (French pronunciation: [si ʃazɛl]; German: Sigach) is a commune in the Moselle department in Grand Est in north-eastern France. The town is built on Mont St. Quentin near Metz.

== History ==
The historical area of Scy-Chazelles was shared between the Gorze Abbey, the Bishop of Metz, and the city of Metz. In 1415, the town was inhabited by Burgundians until it was occupied by the Franks in 1444. Scy (with probable Gaulish linguistical origins) and Chazelles (under Roman occupation, the Latin word castellum, or "watch tower," became Chazelles) existed for many centuries as two separate entities before being put together in 1817. Scy, a village in the pre-Revolutionary province of the Three Bishoprics (Trois-Évêchés), annexed the village of Chazelles. At that time there were 348 inhabitants in 100 houses in Scy and 125 inhabitants in 30 houses in Chazelles.

Scy-Chazelles is located near Mont Saint-Quentin, from where the defense of Metz and its surroundings areas against invasions was organized. The slopes of this mountain produced the varietal "The King of Wines" in the mid-16th century. The village of Scy-Chazelles has more than 13 religious sanctuaries (churches, chapels, crosses, shrines ...), but its most notable is the fortified Saint Quentin Church. The church was founded around 1177 and subsequently strengthened to make people safe from thieves and looters. It also houses the remains of Robert Schuman, the "father of Europe," who died in the town in 1963.

The church of Saint-Rémi, dating from the late 6th century, is known for its Roman architecture with three naves on square pillars built in the 11th century and (later restored in the 15th century). It is located at the Place de l'Esplanade, opposite the town hall, offering a panorama of the city of Metz and its surroundings.

Like other towns of the Moselle, the German Empire annexed Scy-Chazelles as it grew, and the village was part of the German Empire from 1871 to 1918 and from 1940 to 1944. On 1 April 1941 the town of Scy-Chazelles was renamed Sigach and was integrated into the urban of Metz (Stadtkreis Metz). During the Battle of Metz, Scy-Chazelles was defended by the 462nd Volks-Grenadier-Division of General Otto von Knobelsdorff's First Army. On 21 November 1944 Scy-Chazelles was liberated by General George S. Patton's Third Army.

== Sights ==
- Bismarck tower, the only one in France
- Saint Quentin Church

== Population ==
Historical population
Year	Pop.	±% p.a.
1968	2,123	—
1975	2,044	−0.54%
1982	1,991	−0.37%
1990	2,129	+0.84%
1999	2,482	+1.72%
2007	2,799	+1.51%
2012	2,708	−0.66%
2017	2,676	−0.24%
2023	2,753	+0.47%
Source: INSEE

== Notable people ==
- Pierre-Dominique Bazaine (1786–1838), scientist and engineer, was born in Scy.
- Robert Schuman (1886–1963), Luxembourg-born French statesman lived in Scy prior to his death in 1963.

== Education ==
=== Preschool - Ecole Maternelle Sous les Vignes ===
Founded in the 19th century, the Sous les Vignes preschool is the oldest school in Scy-Chazelles. It is located at 11 Rue de Crimée, in the heart of the old Scy village. The building housing the school has been donated to the village of Scy-Chazelles in 1859 by the famous Bouteiller family. Associated to this donation is the legal obligation of maintaining a preschool indefinitely in the donated building.
