= Schuman tunnel =

Rail tunnel in Brussels, Belgium

Coordinates: 50°50′49″N 4°22′55″E

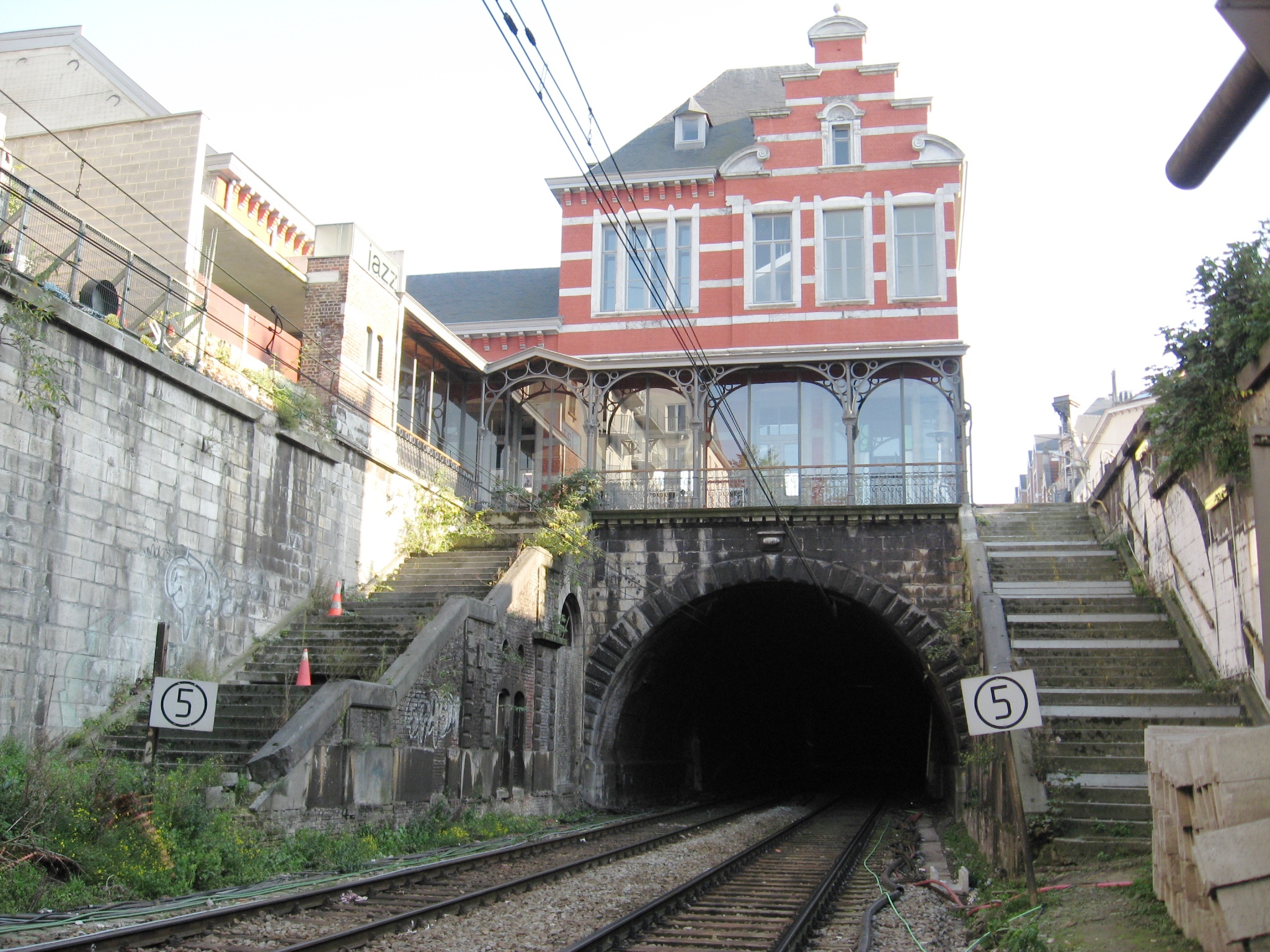
North portal of Schuman tunnel

The Schuman tunnel (French: Tunnel Schuman; Dutch: Schumantunnel) is a 970-metre-long (3,180 ft) rail tunnel in Brussels, Belgium. It passes beneath the Boulevard Clovis/Clovislaan, the Square Ambiorix/Ambiorixsquare and the Boulevard Charlemagne/Karel de Grotelaan. The line running through it is the double track line 161 (Brussels-Namur). The speed limit in the tunnel is 50 km/h (31 mph).

The northern portal is under the Chaussée de Louvain/Leuvensesteenweg station in Saint-Josse-ten-Noode. The southern end contains Brussels-Schuman railway station. The tunnel passes around the back of the Berlaymont building. Travelling northwards, the Schuman tunnel is followed by the Deschanel tunnel, then the Schuman-Josaphat tunnel.

The tunnel takes its name from Robert Schuman, one of the founding fathers of the European Union, the Council of Europe and NATO.
