= Michel Soulié =

French politician

Michel Soulié (10 February 1916 – 15 September 1989) was a French politician.

Soulié was born in Saint-Étienne. He represented the Radical Party in the National Assembly from 1956 to 1958.
