= André Morice =

French politician

André Morice (French pronunciation: [ɑ̃dʁe mɔʁis]; 11 October 1900, Nantes – 17 January 1990) was a French politician. He represented the Radical Party in the Constituent Assembly elected in 1945, in the Constituent Assembly elected in 1946 and in the National Assembly from 1946 to 1958. He was Minister of National Education in 1950, Minister of Merchant Navy from 1951 to 1952, Minister of Public Works from 1952 to 1953, Minister of Commerce and Industry from 1955 to 1956 and Minister of Defence in 1957. He was the mayor of Nantes from 1965 to 1977.

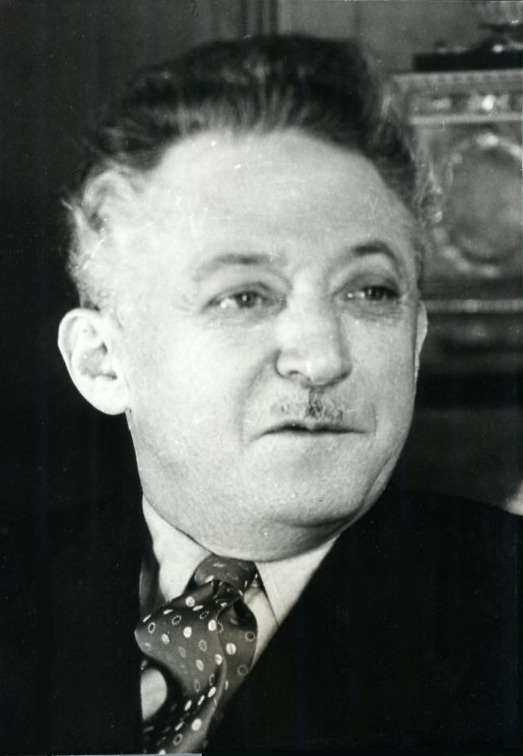
André Morice
