= Robert Lacoste =

French politician (1898–1989)

Robert Lacoste

Robert Lacoste (5 July 1898 – 8 March 1989) was a French politician. He was a socialist MP of the Dordogne from 1945 to 1958, and from 1962 to 1967. He then served as senator from 1971 to 1980.

== Biography ==
Robert Lacoste was born at Azerat (Dordogne). He studied at the law school in Paris, and became a civil servant and CGT trade unionist. He participated in the resistance. In 1944, he was Joint Delegate General of the French Committee of National Liberation for occupied France, and become minister for industrial production in the provisional government of general De Gaulle. A member of both houses of parliament, and socialist MP for the Dordogne, he was Minister of Industry until 1950. He was Minister of Finance and the Economy in 1956.

After Guy Mollet's visit to Algeria, greeted by colons (French-Algerian colonists) throwing tomatoes at him, Lacoste replaced general Catroux in February 1956, becoming resident minister and governor general of Algeria. He remained the minister of Algeria until May 1958. A proponent of forceful action, he played a principal role in the Algerian War. He also promoted accelerated social and economic programmes, highlighted by his efforts to "Algerianise" the administration. He increased Algeria's départements to twelve and drafted the Loi Cadre (enabling or framework law) designed to enhance internal autonomy and Muslim representation.

He sat in the National Assembly once more from 1962 to 1967. From 1971 to 1980, he was elected socialist senator of the Dordogne, assuming from 1974 to 1979 the vice-presidency of the regional council of Aquitaine. President of the superior council of electricity and gas of France in 1950, he was mayor of Azerat until 1983. He died, aged 90, at Périgueux.

== Governmental Positions ==
He was Secretary General of Industrial Production from 26 August to 4 September 1944 and then Minister of Industrial Production from 10 September 1944 to 11 August 1947, also serving as Minister of Work and Social Security (temporary) under the government of Paul Ramadier from 4 to 9 May 1947. He was then Minister of Industry and Commerce from 11 August 1947 to 7 February 1950. He served as Minister of Economic and Financial Affairs from 1 to 9 February 1956. He was Resident Minister in Algeria from 9 February 1956 to 13 June 1957 then Minister of Algeria from 13 June 1957 to 14 May 1958.
