= Maurice Faure =

French politician (1922–2014)

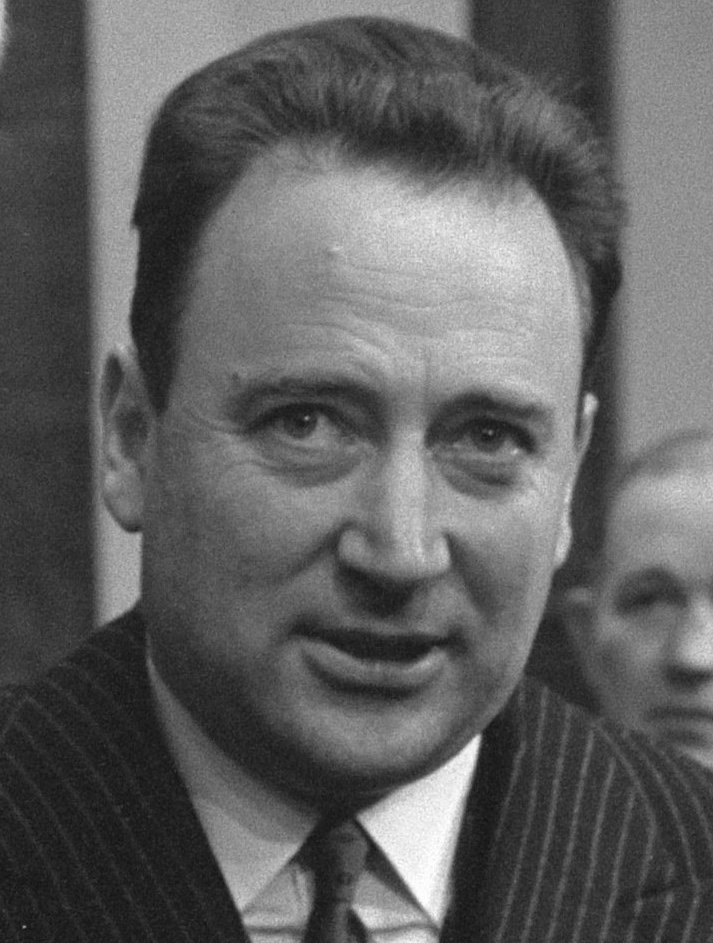
- Maurice Faure at the European demonstration in Den Haag, 1963

Keeper of the Seals, Minister of Justice
- In office 22 May 1981 – 23 June 1981
- President: François Mitterrand
- Prime Minister: Pierre Mauroy
- Preceded by: Alain Peyrefitte
- Succeeded by: Robert Badinter

Member of the Constitutional Council
- In office 1989–1998
- Appointed by: François Mitterrand
- President: Robert Badinter; Roland Dumas
- Preceded by: Georges Vedel
- Succeeded by: Pierre Mazeaud

Personal details
- Born: 2 January 1922 Azerat, France
- Died: 6 March 2014 (aged 92) Cahors, France
- Party: Radical Party of the Left
- Other political affiliations: Radical Party

Maurice Faure (French: [mɔʁis foʁ]; 2 January 1922 – 6 March 2014) was a member of the French Resistance and a minister in several French governments. He was born in Azerat, Dordogne.

He was a deputy in the French parliament from 1951 to 1983 and a Senator from 1983 to 1988, representing Lot and served 25 years as Mayor of Cahors. Faure was appointed to the Constitutional Council of France by President François Mitterrand.

As secretary to the French foreign minister, he co-signed the Treaty of Rome for France in 1957, thus helping to create the European Union.

In 1957, Faure was awarded the Grand Decoration of Honour in Gold with Sash for Services to the Republic of Austria.

Faure died in March 2014 at the age of 92 in Cahors, Lot. He was the last surviving signatory of the Treaty of Rome at the time of his death. He was a Protestant in his youth.
