= Kendall Jenner =

American model and media personality (born 1995)

- Jenner in 2026
- Born: Kendall Nicole Jenner; November 3, 1995 (age 31); Los Angeles, California, U.S.
- Occupations: Model; media personality; socialite
- Years active: 2007–present
- Television: Keeping Up with the Kardashians; The Kardashians
- Parents: Caitlyn Jenner; Kris Jenner (Note: Kris is Kendall's biological mother. Caitlyn transitioned from male to female in 2015.)
- Relatives: Kardashian family
- Modeling information
- Height: 5 ft 11 in (1.80 m)
- Hair color: Brown
- Eye color: Brown
- Agency: The Society Management (New York); Elite Model Management (Paris, Milan, London)

Kendall Nicole Jenner (born November 3, 1995) is an American model, socialite, and media personality. She rose to fame in the reality television show Keeping Up with the Kardashians, in which she starred for 20 seasons and nearly 15 years from 2007 to 2021. The success of the show led to the creation of multiple spin-off series including Kourtney and Khloe Take Miami (2009), Kourtney and Kim Take New York (2011), Khloé & Lamar (2011), Rob & Chyna (2016) and Life of Kylie (2017). Following the decision to end their reality show, in 2022 she and her family starred in the reality television series The Kardashians on Hulu.

Jenner began modeling at the age of 14. After working in commercial print ad campaigns and photoshoots, she had breakout seasons in 2014 and 2015, walking the runways for high-fashion designers during the New York, Milan, and Paris fashion weeks. Jenner has appeared in campaigns, editorials, and cover shoots for LOVE and various international Vogue editions, and is a brand ambassador for Estée Lauder. Jenner made her debut at No. 16 on Forbes magazine's 2015 list of top-earning models, with an estimated annual income of US$4 million, in addition to being selected for the Forbes 30 under 30 list in the Art & Style category in 2024. In 2017, Jenner was named the world's highest-paid model by Forbes, ousting model Gisele Bündchen who had been leading the list since 2002. In 2021, she launched the tequila brand 818 Tequila.

== Early life ==
Kendall Nicole Jenner was born on November 3, 1995, at Cedars-Sinai Medical Center in Los Angeles, California, to former Olympic decathlete champion Caitlyn Jenner (then known as Bruce Jenner) and television personality and businesswoman Kris Jenner (née Houghton). Jenner's middle name was a tribute to Kris' best friend Nicole Brown Simpson, who was murdered just before Jenner was conceived.

Jenner has a younger sister, Kylie, and eight older half-siblings. From Caitlyn's side of the family, she has three older half-brothers―Burt, Brandon, and Brody Jenner―and one older half-sister Casey Marino. From Kris' side of the family, Jenner has three older half-sisters―Kourtney, Kim, and Khloé―and one older half-brother Rob Kardashian.

Jenner was raised with her sister and the Kardashians in Calabasas, an upscale suburb west of Los Angeles. Jenner attended Sierra Canyon School before switching to homeschooling in order to pursue modeling. She graduated in 2014. In May 2014, Jenner purchased a two-bedroom, 2.5-bath condominium in Los Angeles for US$1.4 million.

== Television career ==
In 2007, Jenner's mother, Kris Jenner met with Ryan Seacrest to pursue a reality television show based on her family. Seacrest, who had his own production company, decided to develop the idea, having the family-based show The Osbournes in his mind. The show eventually was picked up to air on the E! cable network, with Jenner's mother acting as the executive producer. The series debuted on October 14, 2007, and revolved around Jenner, along with her parents Kris and Bruce (now Caitlyn) and siblings, Kylie, Kourtney, Kim, Khloé, and Rob. The title of their reality television series Keeping Up with the Kardashians, and it chronicles the personal and professional lives of their family members. The series was successful for its network, E!, and has resulted in the creation of spin-offs, including Kourtney and Kim Take Miami (2009), in which Jenner has made guest appearances.

Jenner was also featured as a recurring cast member in Kourtney and Kim Take New York, which premiered in January 2011. Also in 2011, Jenner made an appearance in her sister's show, Khloe & Lamar when it debuted, and the series focused on Khloe Kardashian and her then husband Lamar Odom's personal life and relationship.

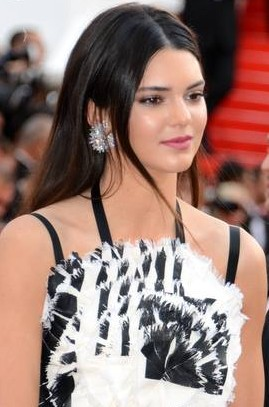
Jenner in 2014 Cannes Film Festival red carpet

On March 26, 2014, E! announced a Keeping Up with the Kardashians spin-off series titled Kourtney & Khloé Take the Hamptons. The Hamptons follows Kourtney, Khloé, and Scott Disick as they relocate to The Hamptons while the girls work on the New York Dash store plus open a pop-up store. The show also featured their family including Jenner.

In 2017, Jenner's younger sister Kylie, featured as the central cast member for the E! reality spin off series Life of Kylie.

In 2021, Jenner and her family announced that their reality show, Keeping Up With the Kardashians, would be ending after twenty seasons and almost 15 years on air.

In April 2022, Jenner and her family returned to the television screens with their brand new reality television show, titled The Kardashians, after they left the E! Network to join Hulu. The show features Jenner, alongside her sisters Kourtney, Kim, Khloe and Kylie, and mother Kris Jenner, it also features ex and current partners including Scott Disick, Travis Barker, Tristan Thompson, and Corey Gamble, with Kanye West making a guest appearance. The first season premiered on April 14, 2022, and its ten episodes can be streamed exclusively on Disney+. Later in 2022, the show was announced to be returning for a second season, which officially premiered on September 22, 2022. In late 2022, it was announced that the show had been officially renewed for a third season, set to premier in the first half of 2023. The third season officially aired on May 25, 2023.

== Modeling career ==
=== 2009–2014: Debut and breakthrough ===
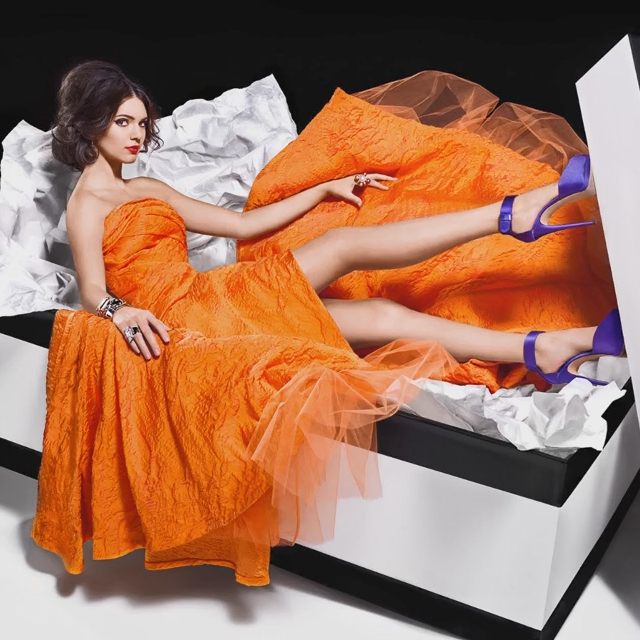
Jenner modeling for Fashion’s Night Out 2012 Campaign

Jenner began modeling at age 13 when Wilhelmina Models signed her on July 12, 2009. Cinematographer Nick Saglimbeni directed the photoshoot for Jenner's Wilhelmina portfolio. Jenner's first modeling job was the Rocker Babes with a Twist campaign for Forever 21 in December 2009 and January 2010. Jenner featured in a Teen Vogue Snapshot on April 19, 2010.

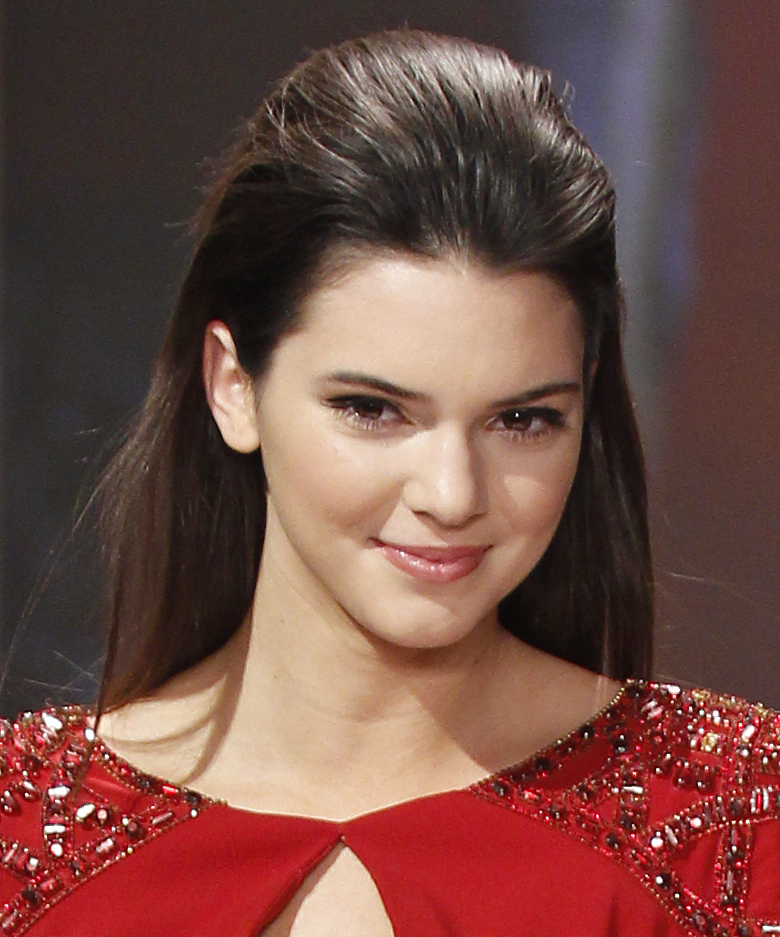
Jenner in 2013

In September 2011, Jenner walked for Sherri Hill during Mercedes-Benz Fashion Week. By the end of 2012, Jenner had covers on American Cheerleader, Teen Prom, Looks, Raine, GenLux, Lovecat, and Flavour Magazine. and booked campaigns for White Sands Australia, Leah Madden, and Agua Bendita. In November 2012, Jenner teamed with Victoria's Secret photographer Russell James for editorial work and joint projects. Over the course of 2013 and 2014, their work together surfaced in Kurv, Miss Vogue Australia, and Harper's Bazaar Arabia. Jenner featured in James' Nomad Two Worlds: Australia book launches in Sydney and Los Angeles. Jenner's editorial work signaled a change of direction to high fashion, and Jenner signed with The Society Management on November 21, 2013.

Jenner walked her first Society Management bookings for Marc Jacobs, Giles Deacon, Givenchy, Chanel, Donna Karan, Diane von Fürstenberg, Tommy Hilfiger, Fendi, Ports 1961, Bottega Veneta, Pucci, Dolce & Gabbana; Sonia Rykiel, and Balmain. Jenner participated in two Chanel public relations events in 2014: one, a feminist rally-themed Chanel event; and two, the company's Metiers D'Art in Salzburg. Jenner shot covers and editorials for Interview LOVE, and Teen Vogue. Jenner was cast in campaigns for Givenchy and a December-themed LOVE advent calendar promotion with Doug Inglish. In November 2014, Jenner became an official Estée Lauder representative. Jenner was hailed as "the 'It Girl' of the season" by LOVE editor Katie Grand.

=== 2015–2017: Rise to success ===
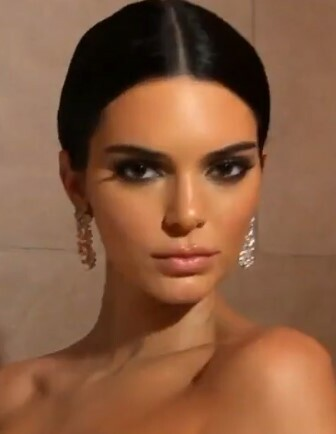
Jenner in 2017 Met Gala

In 2015, Jenner walked for Chanel, Alexander Wang, Diane von Fürstenberg, Donna Karan, Vera Wang, Michael Kors, Marc Jacobs, Oscar de la Renta, Giles Deacon, Fendi, N°21, H&M, Balmain, the annual Dosso Dossi Fashion Show in Antalya, Turkey, Givenchy, Elie Saab, and Ports 1961. Jenner took part in publicity campaigns for Balmain x H&M and walked in the 2015 Victoria's Secret Fashion Show. Jenner shot covers and editorials with Marie Claire Indonesia, Harper's Bazaar, GQ, Vogue China, LOVE, and Vogue issues in Japan, France and America. Jenner featured in campaigns for Marc Jacobs, Karl Lagerfeld, Fendi, Balmain, Estée Lauder, a political campaign for Rock The Vote/Independent Journal Review voter registration, and a second LOVE advent calendar. Jenner signed contracts with Calvin Klein Jeans in March and Penshoppe in May.

In 2016, Jenner and Cara Delevingne were recreated as wax figures for Madame Tussaud's London Fashion Week Experience event. Jenner walked for Chanel, Diane Von Fürstenberg, Vera Wang, Michael Kors, Marc Jacobs, Fendi, Versace, Bottega Veneta, Balmain, Dior, Elie Saab, and Miu Miu. Jenner shot covers and editorials in Vogue Brazil, W Korea, LOVE, Vanity Fair, V, Self Service Magazine, and Harper's Bazaar. Vogue's editors devoted a special edition editorial supplement to Jenner in April.. Jenner had campaign features for Mango, CPS Chaps, Calvin Klein, Rock The Vote/Independent Journal Review, and Denimlab. Jenner announced her signing to Chilean retail chain París in April.

Jenner's 2017 campaign for La Perla caused some controversy when she had to cancel a previously scheduled appearance as a Victoria's Secret model due to her new affiliation with La Perla.

=== 2018–present: Supermodel status ===
Jenner made her debut at No. 16 on Forbes magazine's 2015 list of top-earning models, with an estimated annual income of US$4 million. In 2017, Jenner was named the world's highest-paid model by Forbes, ousting model Gisele Bündchen, who had been leading the list for more than 14 years since 2002. Jenner was appointed as the creative director for the online luxury retailer FWRD in September 2021. In 2022, By Far signed Jenner as the face of their debut fragrance, Daydream. She and her then-boyfriend Bad Bunny starred in an ad campaign for Gucci Valigeria luggage in October 2023. Jenner starred in Tommy Hilfiger's spring 2024 campaign titled Kendall & Friends. In September 2024 she starred in a new campaign for the Calvin Klein Fall 2024 womenswear collection.

== Business career ==
Jenner created two signature nail lacquers for the 2011 Nicole by OPI Kardashian Kolors nail polish line, for which the Jenner sisters eventually earned a combined US$100,000 in endorsement profit. On March 16, 2012, the Jenner sisters were named Creative Directors of the Gillette Venus Gets Ready with Kendall & Kylie Jenner webisode series, which was originally aired on Gillette's Facebook page. In July 2013, the Jenner sisters formed a partnership with Pascal Mouawad's Glamhouse to create the Metal Haven by Kendall & Kylie jewelry collection. In February 2014, the Jenner sisters launched a shoe and handbag line under Steve Madden's Madden Girl line for Nordstrom.

The Jenner sisters previewed The Kendall & Kylie Collection with PacSun on November 15, 2012; the collection launched in February 2013. On February 3, 2015, the Jenner sisters confirmed Kendall + Kylie collaboration with Topshop, which they unveiled in November 2015 at the Chadstone Shopping Centre in Melbourne, Australia. The collection launched in New York on February 8, 2016. On April 27, 2016, the Jenner sisters previewed a summer swimwear collection.

In September 2015, each of the Jenner and Kardashian sisters released paid subscription mobile app websites in collaboration with Whalerock Industries. Jenner's website was nominated for an International Academy of Digital Arts and Sciences 2016 Webby Award in April of that year. The Jenner sisters partnered with Glu Mobile to develop an app spinoff of Kim Kardashian: Hollywood; the Kendall and Kylie app launched February 17, 2016.

In June 2017, Kendall and Kylie, launched a line of "vintage" T-shirts on their website for their lifestyle brand, Kendall + Kylie. The shirts retailed at $125 and featured logos or images of famous musicians or bands (Tupac Shakur, The Doors, Metallica, Pink Floyd, and The Notorious B.I.G.) with bright images or logos associated with the Jenners superimposed over them. The shirts were met with criticism from the public, as well as several cease and desist letters from the estates of the musicians and artists that were featured without permission. The photographer whose portrait of Tupac Shakur was used has since sued the Jenner sisters for copyright infringement. The sisters pulled the shirts from their website and issued a joint apology, "to anyone that has been upset and/or offended, especially to the families of the artists." In June 2020, the Jenners sisters addressed reports that their fashion brand Kendall + Kylie failed to pay factory workers in Bangladesh due to the COVID-19 pandemic. It was reported that Global Brands Group (GBG) previously listed the Kendall + Kylie brand on its website. As a result, the Jenners stated that their company is owned by a separate entity known as 3072541 Canada Inc. even though they say that their brand "has worked with CAA-GBG in the past, in a sales and business development capacity only" and that they "do not currently have any relationship at all with GBG".

Jenner has partnered with Moon, an oral-care brand created by Shaun Neff of Neff Headwear. Jenner helped create one product for the brand, the Kendall Jenner Teeth Whitening Pen in April 2019., In 2019, Jenner made a partnership with the skin-care company Proactiv. In January 2020, she confirmed that a cosmetics line in collaboration with Kylie Cosmetics was in the process. Kylie Cosmetics launched Kendall Jenner x Kylie Cosmetics on June 26, 2020. In October 2020, she launched a stain-removal toothpaste in collaboration with Moon and designer Heron Preston on a limited edition orange stain-removal toothpaste, with just 350 units available on online marketplace StockX. This collaboration simultaneously marking StockX's debut into the personal care/beauty realm.

Jenner's brand 818 Tequila's logo

In February 2021, Jenner announced the upcoming launch of a tequila brand called "818 Tequila". The company was launched by Jenner on Friday, May 21. The company encountered controversy when in February 2022, Tequila 512 of Austin, Texas, sued 818 Tequila for trademark infringement, alleging that 818 copied its name, area-code theme, and vertical yellow rectangle label design. The case was ultimately settled out of court. According to Tequila 512 CEO, Nick Matzorkis, "Tequila 512’s lawsuit against 818 Tequila has been resolved."

== Other ventures ==
Beginning 2015, Jenner featured in a series of commercial ads for various products, including Jenner's signature Pure Color Envy Matte Sculpting Lipstick. In February 2016, Jenner and beauty blogger Irene Kim became guest editors for the Estée Edit, accompanied by a signature Eyeshadow Palette.

In 2016, Jenner began a career as a photographer, her first published work was photographing and styling Kaia Gerber, daughter of supermodel Cindy Crawford, for the sixteenth anniversary issue of LOVE.

In 2010, Jenner was cast in boy band One Call's Blacklight video along with Ashley Benson and Kevin McHale. In 2012, Jenner appeared as AJ on the Hawaii Five-0 episode "I Ka Wa Mamua". Jenner did voiceover for the character Strawberry in The High Fructose Adventures of Annoying Orange episode "Shakesparagus Speare", which aired on January 20, 2014. In August 2014, Jenner appeared in singer PartyNextDoor's video "Recognize" with sister Kylie Jenner and rapper Drake. Jenner made a cameo appearance in the heist film Ocean's 8, which was released on June 8, 2018.

Seventeen magazine featured Kendall and Kylie Jenner as Style Stars of 2011 and selected them as "Style Ambassadors" for the magazine. In 2014, the Jenner sisters co-authored novel Rebels: City of Indra with ghostwriter Maya Sloan. On May 24, 2016, the Regan Arts division of Phaidon Press announced that the Jenner sisters, Elizabeth Killmond-Roman, and Katherine Killmond created Time Of The Twins as a sequel to Rebels: City Of Indra.

== Personal life ==
In November 2020, Jenner faced significant public criticism after having a birthday party with a hundred plus attendance during the COVID-19 pandemic. The party was attended by many celebrities, including Justin and Hailey Bieber, the Weeknd, and Winnie Harlow, despite Los Angeles County having a stay-at-home order in effect. Jenner's mother responded to the criticism, telling Andy Cohen, "we are really responsible, and we make sure that everyone in our family and our closest friends are tested religiously. So, you know, we do what we can, we, we try to follow the rules."

Jenner told Vogue magazine that she practices Transcendental Meditation (TM) to help clear her mind. "I had a lot of people in the industry say to me, 'I know you have a busy schedule—what do you do to stay calm, cool, and collected?' I was like, 'Um, nothing?' And then one day, when I was having a freak-out—I was having multiple freak-outs—I was like, OK, I'm going to try this. So I found this lady, she's awesome, she taught me TM, and I love it," she told the magazine.

=== Relationships ===
Jenner dated English singer Harry Styles from 2013 to 2016; she was a source of inspiration for his first solo studio album. She was in an on-again,-off-again relationship with NBA player Ben Simmons from June 2018 to February 2020. From June 2020 to October 2022, Jenner was in a relationship with NBA player Devin Booker. She was in a relationship with Puerto Rican rapper Bad Bunny from February 2023 to September 2024.

=== Activism ===
In October 2020, Jenner expressed support for Armenia and the Republic of Artsakh on her Instagram story by reposting Kim Kardashian's video message urging viewers to donate to the All-Armenian Foundation.

== Public image ==
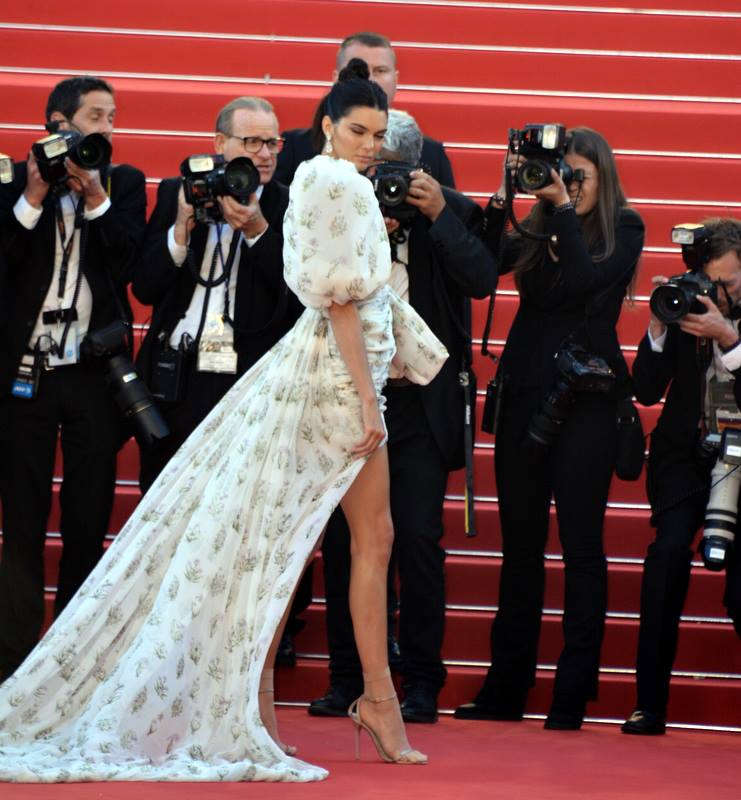
Jenner at the 2017 Cannes Film Festival

Jenner was named as one of People magazine's 50 most beautiful people in the world on April 9, 2014. Time magazine named the Jenner sisters as two of the 30 Most Influential Teens 2014 and 2015. On December 16, 2014, Google named Jenner as the second most Googled model in the world. Jenner debuted at No. 2 on FHM's annual 100 Sexiest Women in the World list at the end of April 2015. Tumblr named Jenner as its most reblogged model for 2015. In November 2017, Forbes listed Jenner as the No.1 highest-paid model in the world.

=== Impact of viral promotion on fashion e-commerce ===
Jenner's rapid career ascent led Dazed magazine's editors to rank her "top creative to watch out for" in 2015 on their annual Dazed 100 list, Jenner collaborated with the editors of Dazed on a Mean Girls-inspired "Burn Book" parody, responding to her online critics and industry detractors. The video was later shortlisted in September 2015 for the International Academy of Digital Arts and Sciences' annual Lovie Awards in the Internet Viral Video category.

The rapid rise of the "Instagirls" has accelerated a decade-long reassessment of the interaction between fashion and social media. Jenner's adeptness at connecting with Millennials online has given her access to a large demographic market, with the ability to further segment her fan base and find ideal clients. Designer Sally LaPorte claimed Jenner's approval of her line helped the designer identify the characteristics of her ideal buyers. Former Calvin Klein women's creative director Francisco Costa praised Jenner's social cachet: "Her social media reach is just incredible [...] As a house, you become part of the culture by embracing someone like her." Jenner's ongoing participation in Calvin Klein promotions has proven to be profitable, as parent company the Phillips-Van Heusen Corporation announced a 13% increase in net sales over the previous year's first quarter in May 2016, with the financials also indicating a 10.5% increase in revenue. According to CEO Emanuel Chirico, increased earnings resulted from the restructuring of the company's global creative strategy for Calvin Klein and its associated #MyCalvins ad campaigns.

Consequently, other brands have adapted to the potential impact of high-profile influencers on promotional strategies. Dear Frances footwear brand creative Jane Frances engineered an open-door branding strategy in such a way that her brand is able to successfully do promotional work either with or without influencer input. European ice cream company Magnum moved aggressively into online branding initiatives by featuring Suki Waterhouse and Jenner as company spokesmodels. Even without a sponsorship deal, Jenner's fashion choices can have an impact, as seen by fashion brand Rat & Boa, who had a boost to sales when Jenner wore a pair of their shorts at the Coachella festival.

In the midst of these changes, tech entrepreneur Frank Spadafora designed his company's D'Marie app as a fashion industry-specific Q Score alternative in order to effectively measure the monetary imprint fashion influencers and brand ambassadors are able to attain. The app's deployment worked to Jenner's advantage; she ranked as D'Marie's #1 fashion influencer across all categories as of February 19, 2016, with the ability to earn between US$125,000 and US$300,000 for a single update to her social media platforms.

=== Cutera lawsuit ===
On February 10, 2016, lawyers representing Jenner Inc. filed a $10 million lawsuit against esthetic medical company Cutera at the United States District Court for the Central District of California. Jenner's legal team objected to the company using her brand without authorization. Cutera had featured Jenner in ad campaigns for its Laser Genesis acne treatment. In May 2016, Jenner's attorneys dropped the charges.

=== Fyre Festival ===
In 2017, Kendall Jenner was paid $275,000 for an Instagram post announcing that some members of the G.O.O.D. Music record label would be performing at Fyre Festival, and that her followers could buy tickets using a discount code she provided. The post, which has since been deleted, was not tagged as an #ad despite Jenner's compensation and the Federal Trade Commission law which requires paid posts on social media to be disclosed transparently. Fyre Festival was a fraudulent "luxury music festival" founded by Billy McFarland, CEO of Fyre Media Inc, and rapper Ja Rule. Three months after Netflix and Hulu released incriminating documentaries revealing the corrupt and unorganized preparations behind Fyre Festival, Jenner apologized for her involvement during an interview with The New York Times. Jenner said, "You get reached out to by people to, whether it be to promote or help or whatever, and you never know how these things are going to turn out, sometimes it's a risk, I definitely do as much research as I can, but sometimes there isn't much research you can do because it's a starting brand and you kind of have to have faith in it and hope it will work out the way people say it will. You never really know what's going to happen."

The trustee for the Fyre Festival bankruptcy sued Jenner, along with other artists and influencers associated with the festival, alleging that payments to influencers were part of the scheme to defraud investors. Jenner settled for $90,000.

=== Pepsi advertisement ===
In April 2017, Pepsi cast Jenner as the star for the commercial advertisement in a role in which she used the beverage to make peace between police officers and protesters. This ad was criticized for trivializing the protests against police brutality, particularly as it affects African Americans. Pepsi pulled the ad within a day, and apologized to Jenner for putting her in this position. She was reportedly "devastated" by the ad, although she "had the right to approve the ad before it was released". According to the same source, Jenner's contract with Pepsi prohibited her from commenting on the fallout.

=== Kendall + Kylie "Rock vs. Rap" collection ===
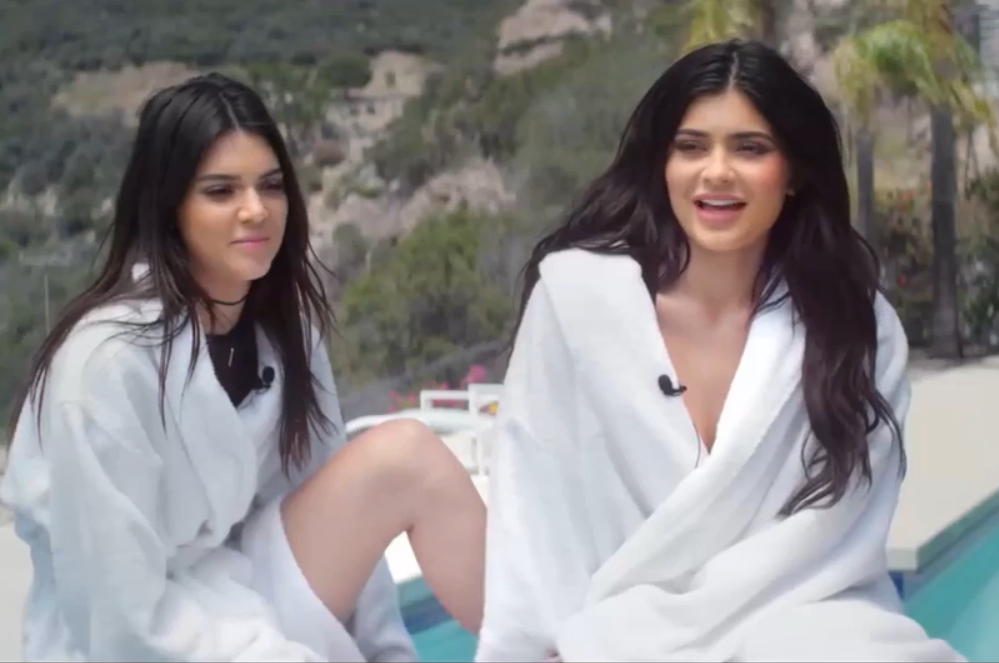
Jenner (left) with her younger sister Kylie

On June 28, 2017, the Jenner sisters announced that they would be releasing a line of vintage T-shirts for their Kendall + Kylie line of clothing called Rock vs. Rap, featuring the likenesses of various rock and rap artists including The Notorious B.I.G., Tupac Shakur, Metallica, Pink Floyd, The Doors, Ozzy Osbourne, and Led Zeppelin, with pictures of the Jenner sisters superimposed over them. The announcement of this line of products was met with swift backlash from relatives and representatives of the figures depicted on the shirts themselves, including Sharon Osbourne, Jeff Jampol, and Voletta Wallace, mother of Biggie Smalls. They were also criticized on social media and were called "insensitive." Wallace, The Doors' manager and the estate of Jim Morrison issued a cease-and-desist letter to the Jenner sisters, writing that they did not authorize the sisters' use of the likenesses of these musical icons. The Jenners apologized for the shirts, and pulled them from retail.

=== 818 tequila campaign ===
In May 2021, Jenner was criticised for culturally appropriating Mexican culture after sharing the campaign shoot for her tequila company, 818 Tequila, on Instagram. The advertisement featured scenes of Jenner on a horse in an agave field where native farmers were harvesting the agave, before raising a glass with them. Jenner shortly disabled comments on the post following complaints and her representatives declined to comment when contacted.

=== Liu Jo lawsuit ===
In August 2021, Jenner was sued for $1.8 million by Italian fashion company Liu Jo for allegedly breaching her contract. The suit claimed that Jenner had caused "great expense" for the company by only completing one of two photoshoots for which she had already been paid $1.35 million of the total $1.5 million, in addition to 20% service fees she had been offered. The brand claimed that Jenner had completed the photoshoot for the Spring/Summer 2020 campaign but, due to the COVID-19 pandemic, could not complete the one intended for the Fall/Winter 2020 campaign. The company states that they offered to postpone the shoot but Jenner "repeatedly failed to provide [them] with definitive responses to [their] proposals, proposed no reasonable alternatives, and ultimately turned down all of their "good-faith offers of compromise". The suit claims that Jenner cited health concerns and told the brand she could not travel to Italy for the shoot but then did so for another designer, whilst also travelling for numerous "non-essential trips and hosting large parties with her friends". Jenner herself did not comment, but a representative for her stated that the suit was meritless and that Jenner had offered the fashion company alternative dates for the second photoshoot and "willingly offered to complete services honouring her commitments".

== Philanthropy ==
Jenner set up an eBay account where she auctions old clothing to raise money for Children's Hospital Los Angeles. The Kardashian and Jenner sisters used eBay in this way to raise money for their charities in 2013.

Jenner joined her family in a charity yard sale on November 10, 2013. Proceeds from the sale were donation-matched and sent to Share Our Strength: No Kid Hungry and the Greater Los Angeles Fisher House Foundation.

Jenner and Kim Kardashian attended a Christmas Eve visit with the kids at Children's Hospital Los Angeles on Tuesday December 24, 2013. Jenner joined Khloe Kardashian, Lil Twist, and The Game at PINZ bowling alley in Studio City, California, for a charity bowling game on January 19, 2014. The event was held to raise money for The Robin Hood Foundation, a nonprofit for which The Game pledged to raise US$1 million in donations. Jenner, with her sister, Kylie, participated in singer Chris Brown's two Kick'n It For Charity celebrity kickball games in Glendale, California, in 2014 and on August 16, 2014. Jenner, Ansel Elgort, Gigi Hadid, and Jenner's agent Ashleah Gonzales encountered unhoused model/actor John Economou in Venice Beach during a fashion shoot in 2015, a meeting which led to Economou being signed to a Two Management contract by company president Luc Brinker. On February 14, 2015, Jenner appeared at Marc Jacobs' Bookmarc store in New York City for the launch of Love issue 13. She posed in a limited-edition T-shirt sale to raise proceeds for Designers Against AIDS.

On her birthday in 2017, Jenner launched a birthday campaign and invited fans to donate $22 in honor of her turning 22 to Charity: Water, a non-profit organization bringing clean and safe drinking water to people in developing countries. In 2020, Jenner, with her brand, Zaza World, launched merchandise to benefit COVID-19 pandemic relief efforts; net profits went to Feeding America, a nationwide network of food banks which supports shelters, soup kitchens, and underserved communities.

== Filmography ==
=== As herself ===
| Year | Title | Notes | Ref. |
|---|---|---|---|
| 2007–2021 | Keeping Up with the Kardashians | Main role, 19 episodes | |
| 2009 | Kourtney and Khloé Take Miami | Episode: "It's My Life" | |
| 2011 | Kourtney and Kim Take New York | 2 episodes | |
| 2011 | Khloé & Lamar | Episode: "Unbreakable" | |
| 2012 | America's Next Top Model Cycle 18 | Episode: "Kris Jenner" | |
| 2014 | Ridiculousness | Episode: "Kendall and Kylie Jenner" | |
| 2014 | 2014 Much Music Video Awards | Co-host (with Kylie Jenner) | |
| 2015 | Taylor Swift: The 1989 World Tour Concert film | Filmed at Hyde Park, London | |
| 2015 | I Am Cait | Documentary | |
| 2015 | Victoria's Secret Fashion Show 2015 | Fashion show | |
| 2016 | Victoria's Secret Fashion Show 2016 | Fashion show | |
| 2018 | Victoria's Secret Fashion Show 2018 | Fashion show | |
| 2020 | Justin Bieber: Seasons | Cameo | |
| 2022–present | The Kardashians | Main role | |

=== As actress ===
| Year | Title | Role | Notes | Ref. |
|---|---|---|---|---|
| 2012 | Hawaii Five-0 | AJ | Episode: "I Ka Wa Mamua" (3.6) | |
| 2014 | The High Fructose Adventures of Annoying Orange | Strawberry | Episode: "Shakesparagus Speare" (2.23) | |
| 2018 | Ocean's 8 | Herself | Cameo | |
| 2025 | The Tiger | Herself | Short film for Gucci | |

=== Music videos ===
| Year | Title | Artist | Role | Ref. |
|---|---|---|---|---|
| 2010 | "Blacklight" | One Call | Love interest | |
| 2014 | "Recognize" | PartyNextDoor (featuring Drake) | Driver | |
| 2016 | "Where's the Love?" | The Black Eyed Peas (featuring The World) | Herself | |
| 2017 | "Enchanté (Carine)" | Fergie (featuring Axl Jack) | Herself | |
| 2018 | "Freaky Friday" | Lil Dicky (featuring Chris Brown) | Herself | |
| 2019 | "I Think" | Tyler, the Creator | | |
| 2020 | "Stuck with U" | Ariana Grande and Justin Bieber | Herself | |

== Awards and nominations ==
| Year | Association | Category | Result | Ref. |
|---|---|---|---|---|
| 2013 | Teen Choice Awards | Choice TV Reality Star: Female (shared with female cast of KUWTK) | Won | |
| 2014 | Young Hollywood Awards | You're So Fancy | Nominated | |
| 2014 | Young Hollywood Awards | Style Icon | Nominated | |
| 2014 | Teen Choice Awards | Choice Female Hottie | Nominated | |
| 2014 | Teen Choice Awards | Candie's Choice Style Icon | Nominated | |
| 2014 | Teen Choice Awards | Choice TV Reality Personality, Female (shared with female cast of KUWTK) | Nominated | |
| 2015 | Teen Choice Awards | Choice Model | Won | |
| 2015 | InStyle Social Media Awards | Runway Rockstar | Nominated | |
| 2015 | InStyle Social Media Awards | Trendiest Teen Queen | Nominated | |
| 2015 | IADAS: The Lovie Awards | Internet Video: Viral Video | Won | |
| 2016 | IADAS: The Webby Awards | Celebrity Website | Nominated | |
| 2016 | Teen Choice Awards | Choice Model | Won | |
| 2016 | Teen Choice Awards | Choice Female Hottie | Won | |
| 2016 | British Fashion Awards | International Model | Nominated | |
| 2017 | Teen Choice Awards | Choice Model | Won | |
| 2017 | Daily Front Row Fashion Media Awards | Fashion Icon Of The Decade | Won | |
| 2018 | Teen Choice Awards | Female Choice Hottie | Nominated | |
| 2018 | Teen Choice Awards | Choice Snapchatter | Nominated | |
