= Transformers G1: Awakening =

2008 video game

- Developer: Glu Mobile
- Publisher: Glu Mobile
- Platforms: Mobile, iOS, Android, WebOS, BlackBerry OS
- Release: November 12, 2008 iOS; February 25, 2010
- Genre: Turn-based tactics
- Mode: Single-player

Transformers G1: Awakening is a turn-based tactics mobile game in the Transformers franchise developed and published by Glu Mobile. It was originally released for feature phones on November 12, 2008, before being ported to IOS in 2010. The game has been removed from the Apple App Store due to licensing reasons.

== Background ==
Transformers G1: Awakening was announced at BotCon 2008 with a worldwide release set for Fall of that year. This was the second Transformers game from Glu Mobile; they had released a platform game for mobile phones based on Michael Bay's 2007 live-action Transformers film. As the next Transformers film, Revenge of the Fallen, would not be released until 2009, Glu decided to maximize their licensing agreement by producing a game that wasn't tied to a major release. Unlike the film adaptations, Awakening was planned as a turn-based tactics game with role-playing elements, with a story set in the early days of the 1980s animated series. In an interview with fan site TFormers.com, Glu Mobile EMEA studio head Chris White and Awakening Product Manager Martin Edelman explained that their desire to make such a game was based on their admiration for the 1986 animated film, as well as for the Marvel Comics series. They compared their game to the Advance Wars series, but explained that it differed in that the units were not "expendable cannon fodder". Instead, each unit was a unique character from the franchise, with individual strengths and attributes based on their existing personas. The game was developed at Glu's UK office (which was previously the company Macrospace), so they had previous experience with turn-based tactics games, having developed the Ancient Empires series.

== Gameplay ==
Like most turn-based tactics games, the player controls units (in this case, a cast of 23 Generation 1 Transformers characters) across small-scale, grid-based levels. In order to encourage as much "transforming" as possible, the player is given the option to turn each robot into their vehicle form (or vice versa) at the end of their turn. While in vehicle mode, Transformers can travel further, and receive reduced damage, but cannot attack. While in robot mode, they gain the ability to attack other Transformers, and to capture structures necessary that produce energy (like pylons). Energy sources provide energon, which acts as the currency for the game. Energon allows the player to upgrade or repair units, or to summon additional characters into play.

In the main campaign, players control the heroic Autobots, battling Megatron's forces of villainous Decepticons. Starting the game with Bumblebee and Ratchet, additional characters are added as the story progresses, each with unique abilities or characteristics. The Autobot leader, Optimus Prime, gives a "morale boost" to any friendly units in adjacent spaces, which increases their battle performance. Ratchet (who turns into an ambulance) is the game's only medic, and as such his survival is key to the other robots' survival. The city-sized Metroplex serves as the Autobots' mobile base, and is used to summon supporting characters like Prowl, Ironhide, and Sideswipe (Trypticon serves the same function for the Decepticons). The boombox Blaster is able to summon minicassettes Eject and Rewind, and the same goes for Decepticon Soundwave with his underlings Frenzy and Rumble. As in the cartoon, Jetfire must be converted from a Decepticon, and transforming Tyrannosaur Grimlock crushes Decepticons with ease.

== Reception ==
=== Feature phones ===
The initial release for non-smart mobile phones in 2008 drew positive attention based on the concept alone. When commenting on the announcement of the September release date, Pocket Gamer's Spanner Spencer said that he was glad to hear the game was based on the original series, and not the live-action film, the latter being described as a "pile of rust cleverly disguised as a CGI extravaganza". Kotaku's Luke Plunkett was impressed by an early trailer for the game, hoping that developers would realize the value of a port to Nintendo DS. He later repeated the sentiment when announcing a playable Java-based demo, saying the game looked "(surprisingly) fantastic".

Reviewers that were actually able to play the game were equally positive. In an early hands-on preview for Pocket Gamer, Keith Andrew, who claimed he had never previously understood the appeal of Transformers, said the game was "bursting with fun". Though he felt the game objectives were challenging, and may require several play-throughs to master, he also felt the controls were simple enough that newcomers would not be daunted. He commended Glu Mobile for creating a game that both caters to the fan base and appeals to a wider audience. In a later full review, he described the gameplay as "resource management meets chess". He felt that the game made the trial-and-error, puzzle-like nature of the levels somehow enjoyable, rather than frustrating. He gave the game a score of 8/10, and awarded it Pocket Gamer's Silver Award.

The 2008 mobile release of Awakening was featured in a retrospective titled "The Visual History of Optimus Prime in Video Games" by IGN's Jack DeVries & Brian Altano. They felt that Awakening, in addition to being a "pretty good" strategy game, was the first game to perfect the appearance of Optimus Prime, only being supplanted by the later War for Cybertron. They felt the cel-shaded graphics, and colorful, flat textures made Optimus "pop off the screen like the action figure he was."

=== Smartphones ===
The 2010 ports to smartphone operating systems were met with similar enthusiasm. After the initial announcement, Kotaku's Mike Fahey wrote that he eagerly awaited any game that featured the G1 Transformers over "the Michael Bay-bots". In a later, full review, Kotaku's Luke Plunkett called the game "surprisingly authentic" with regards to the animated series. He also felt that the game could stand on its own as a well made turn-based strategy game. He said the 3D rendered battle sequences looked "glorious" for an iPhone, but felt the only downside was that the simplistic graphics and animation outside of battle, which showed the game's roots as a mobile game. He concluded by recommending the game to anyone that is either a "long-suffering fan" of the animated Transformers, or a fan of turn-based strategy games, stating it was "easily" one of the best games of its genre available for iOS.

IGN's Levi Buchanan felt that although his lifelong affinity for the Transformers inclined him to judge any poorly made adaptations harshly, Awakening did not disappoint Transformers fans. He lauded the thoughtful merger of Advance Wars-style gameplay with classic Transformers fiction, stating that the game was "great because the story and strength of the Transformers are expertly woven into the entire production." He felt the mission goals were completely inline with advancing the story, and that "nothing is arbitrary". He also felt that Glu's choice of Transformers characters was excellent, and thought the cel-shading and dynamic camera in battle sequences made the robot models look "terrific". He gave the game a score of 8.5 out of 10, and concluded by stating "Transformers G1: Awakening is quite simply the best Transformers game I have ever played."
