= Plain Vanilla Games =

Icelandic video game developer

PV Hugbúnaður hf.
- Trade name: Plain Vanilla Games
- Formerly: PV Hugbúnaður ehf (2010–2014)
- Type: Subsidiary
- Industry: Video games
- Founded: 19 December 2010; 15 years ago
- Founder: Thor Fridriksson
- Defunct: 31 August 2016
- Fate: Dissolved
- Headquarters: Reykjavík, Iceland
- Key people: Thor Fridriksson (CEO); Ymir Finnbogason (CFO); Arni Jonsson (CTO)
- Products: QuizUp
- Number of employees: 36 (2016)
- Parent: Glu Mobile (2016)
- Subsidiaries: Plain Vanilla Corp.

PV Hugbúnaður hf., doing business as Plain Vanilla Games, was an Icelandic video game developer based in Reykjavík. Founded in October 2010 by Thor Fridriksson, the company was best known for developing the trivia-based mobile game QuizUp, at its peak the fastest-growing iOS game ever.

== History ==
=== Foundation and growth (2010–2013) ===
Plain Vanilla Games was founded by Thor Fridriksson, chief executive officer. It published its first title The Moogies for pre-school aged kids on the App store in November 2011, but although critically acclaimed, the game turned out to be a major flop which left Plain Vanilla indebted. Looking for a second product, Þorsteinn had realised that popular games like Words with Friends and Draw Something merely modified already existing analogue games. And while a mobile version of Trivial Pursuit was already on the market, it seemed rudimentary to him, lacking topical range and social interaction.

He went to San Francisco to sell his idea but first ran into a wall of negativity: "It… wasn't easy. I thought I'd just charm my way in front of these VCs, share my big idea for a quiz platform, and they'd throw money my way. Not quite. Just connecting with the right people was a challenge. I'd cold call and ask for meetings, and they'd maybe be willing to set something up for 2, 3 months later. I had to be creative to get in front of these VCs. It maybe even bordered on stalking. In hindsight, maybe it was a bit creepy." In the end he sought out compatriot David Helgason, the CEO of game development company Unity Technologies and with his endorsement received $1.2 million in seed funding. In 2012, he managed to convince an affiliate of Lions Gate Entertainment (LGF) to partner with Plain Vanilla on a trial trivia game for the Twilight series. The game, released in November 2012, was a hit with about 2 million registered users who gave the company valuable feedback. Sequoia Capital started backing them as investors and Plain Vanilla added their partner Roelof Botha to its board, just like Ellie Wheeler of Greycroft Partners, Chinese holding company Tencent also became a strategic partner. The QuizUp app was launched in November 2013 for iPhones.

=== Dissolution and acquisition (2016) ===
On 31 August 2016, the company closed its Iceland headquarters, letting go all staff, though stating that they would continue to maintain QuizUp for a further three months. Plain Vanilla Games and QuizUp were acquired by Glu Mobile on 19 December 2016, the deal valued at US$7.5 million, including forgiven debt.
