= Rat & Boa =

London-based womenswear brand

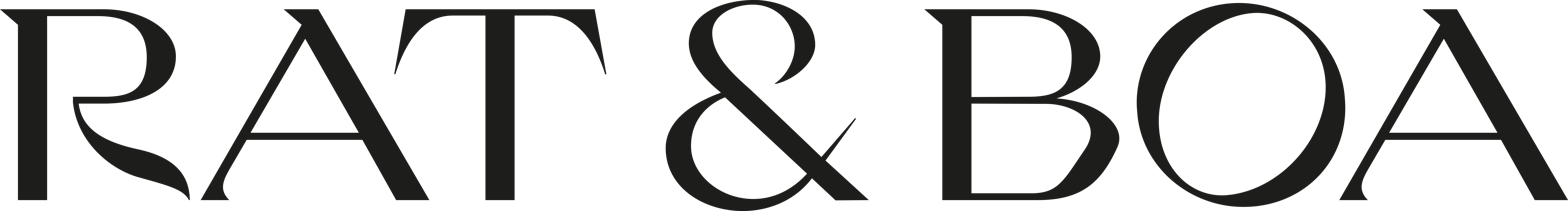
- Type: Private
- Industry: Fashion; Retail
- Founded: 2015; 11 years ago
- Founders: Valentina Muntoni; Stephanie Cara Bennett
- Headquarters: London, United Kingdom
- Area served: Worldwide
- Products: Dresses; Swimwear; Tailoring
- Services: Direct-to-consumer e-commerce
- Website: ratandboa.com

Rat & Boa is a London-based womenswear brand founded in 2015 by Valentina Muntoni and Stephanie Bennett. Operating primarily online from its London atelier, the label is known for 1990s-inspired slip dresses, distinctive silhouettes, and original prints.

The brand specialises in occasionwear, wedding guest dresses, resortwear, and gowns, and has developed an international following. It has also expanded into jewellery.

== History ==
Valentina Muntoni and Stephanie Cara Bennett met in 2008 while studying fashion styling and design at university. After reconnecting several years later in Bangkok, they self-funded the launch of Rat & Boa in 2015. They later operated the brand from Bali and Berlin before opening a permanent atelier in London. The brand's name was inspired by a quote from musician Stevie Nicks, who described her relationship with Fleetwood Mac bandmate Lindsey Buckingham as being "about as compatible as a rat and a boa constrictor".

Rat & Boa initially focused on statement dresses before expanding into other categories. It introduced soft tailoring in 2020 and launched swimwear in 2021. Its range has since grown to include bridalwear, resortwear, occasionwear, bags, and jewellery. Forever Loves is the brand's permanent core collection, designed around enduring styles.

In 2021, The Independent included Rat and Boa in its list of the leading online fashion retailers. Rat & Boa's designs have been worn by figures including Bella and Gigi Hadid, Kendall and Kylie Jenner, Kim Kardashian, Lila Moss, Candice Swanepoel, Kaia Gerber, Irina Shayk, Ariana Grande, Adwoa Aboah, Alexa Chung, Rosie Huntington-Whiteley, Emily Ratajkowski, Olivia Dean, and Elsa Hosk.

== Sustainability ==
Rat & Boa focuses on using materials from certified responsible sources. It also has initiatives related to production, social responsibility, and publishes a sustainability report annually.
