= Kendall and Kylie =

Kendall & Kylie
- Developer: Glu Mobile
- Publisher: Glu Mobile
- Platforms: iOS, Android
- Release: February 17, 2016 (discontinued September 12, 2022)
- Genres: Casual, role-playing game

Kendall & Kylie is a casual free-to-play role-playing game that was released on iOS and Android in February 2016. In the game, the player's goal is to increase their fame and follower count, starting at the 100 follower club to 1 million follower club. The game was officially shut down on September 12, 2022.

== Gameplay ==
In Kendall & Kylie, players aim to increase their popularity by gaining social media followers in order to become celebrities. Players can gain more followers by attending concerts, vlogging, party appearances, and going on dates. Actions taken during tasks and dates cost energy, which refills over time, but gain the player money and experience. High ratings on jobs and dates earn you more followers and increases your social media popularity. Players have full freedom to customize their appearance as the game is heavily driven on sharing looks by posting pictures on to a feed. The game app may be free to play, but in game money and "K-gems", which can be used to buy "exclusive" clothing, houses, pets, or refilling your energy can be purchased for a fee.

== Similarities and differences with Kim Kardashian: Hollywood ==
Both Kendall & Kylie and Kim Kardashian: Hollywood were created by the game app developer GLU Mobile. The premise of both of the apps are very similar in climbing the Hollywood social ladder and making a career based on who the player associates themselves with. Also, the appearance of the two games are exactly the same having a 2-dimensional cartoon aesthetic making the two games look like they exist in the same world.

One of the major differences between the games is that the Kendall & Kylie app interface is to be played in portrait mode while, Kim Kardashian: Hollywood is played in landscape mode. Another major difference is the personal touch that Kendall and Kylie Jenner give to their fans through live action personal videos of themselves.

== In-game rewards ==
Like most free for play app games, the Kendall & Kylie app rewards the player with constant incentives throughout the gameplay.

The following are the list of items players are rewarded for constant gameplay.

- Energy (to complete more individual game tasks)
- Stars (to achieve a high rating event)
- K-gems (to purchase exclusive items and advance in the game quicker)
- Followers (to move up in the social media popularity contest)
- Money (to purchase items)
- Personal live action video messages from Kendall and Kylie Jenner

== Development ==
The game app was developed by GLU Mobile - who also created the successful Kim Kardashian: Hollywood game app. In March 2015 GLU Mobile announced their partnership with Kendall and Kylie Jenner for the development of a new mobile title.

== Release ==
Kendall & Kylie was released on IOS and Android February 17, 2016. In the first 5 days of release the game made the top number 1 spot on the iOS App Store and #35 in the Google Play Store. While on the iOS app store, the game was rated 4.5 stars.
