= Glyder =

Glyder may refer to the Glyderau, a range of mountains (some with the name Glyder) in north Wales. The name can also refer to:

== Places ==
- Glyder (electoral ward), in Bangor, Wales

== Miscellaneous ==
- Glyder (band), a hard rock music group from Ireland
- Glyder 2, a 2009 video game
- Glyder, a puppy with large ears, introduced in the second series of TV animation The Puppy's Further Adventures
