= Jenn Im =

American vlogger

- Born: September 22, 1990 (age 35); Los Angeles, California, U.S.
- Occupations: YouTuber; fashion designer
- Spouse: Ben Jolliffe (m. 2017; sep. 2024)

YouTube information
- Channel: Jenn Im
- Years active: 2010–present
- Genres: Beauty; fashion; vlog
- Subscribers: 3.23 million
- Views: 318 million
- Last updated: 4 August 2026
- Website: www.imjennim.com

Jennifer Dohee Im (born September 22, 1990) is an American fashion beauty vlogger and fashion designer. She is best known for her YouTube channel, previously titled ClothesEncounters, which began in 2010 and reached approximately 2.4 million subscribers as of 2019.

In August 2017, Im launched Eggie, a clothing line that sold out within minutes of its online release. Forbes named Im one of the "top influencers" in fashion in 2017.

== Career ==
=== YouTube ===
Im and Sarah Chu started the YouTube channel, ClothesEncounters, in 2010 while the two were living in Los Angeles. Their videos focused on affordable fashion and quickly developed a fanbase. Chu left ClothesEncounters at the end of 2011 after Im moved away to attend the University of California, Davis. Im continued to create videos for the channel, which garnered more than 319 million views by August 2019. She currently has over 3.07 million subscribers on her YouTube channel.

=== Collaborations ===
Im has collaborated with numerous beauty and fashion brands, including Calvin Klein, Levi's, Macy's, and Clinique. In 2016, she released a makeup collection called "Jenn Ne Sais Quoi" with cosmetics brand ColourPop.

=== Fashion line ===
In August 2017, Im launched a clothing line called Eggie, which is the Korean word for "baby" and a reference to Im's position as the youngest member of her family. The clothing line incorporated elements of Im's Korean heritage and also featured gender-neutral clothing items. The line sold out within minutes of its online release. The line releases several collections a year. On July 23, 2021, Im announced on her socials that after 3 years and 18 collections, Eggie would be closing its doors to focus on her next chapter in life as a new mother.

== Personal life ==
Im's parents were born in South Korea. Her mother is a bank teller, and her father works in clothing manufacturing. Im was born and raised in Los Angeles County, California. She has an older brother named James. She studied in community college before she transferred to the University of California, Davis and graduated with a bachelor's degree in Communications Studies in 2013.

On March 26, 2017, Im married Ben Jolliffe, former drummer for the British alternative rock band Young Guns. They held their wedding ceremony in Malibu on August 18, 2018. In May 2024, Im announced that, after six years of marriage, she and Joliffe had decided to separate, while remaining friends and co-parenting their son, Lennon.
