= Stimulated =

2015 single by Tyga

Single by Tyga

from the album Fuk Wat They Talkin Bout
- Released: August 31, 2015
- Length: 3:44
- Label: Last Kings
- Songwriters: Michael Stevenson; Roberto Concina; Joseph Epperson; Alexander Edward; Tarell Meeks
- Producer: Crakwav

Tyga singles chronology
| "On Time" (2015) | "Stimulated" (2015) | "I Might Go Lesbian" (2015) |

"Stimulated" (stylized as "$timulated") is a song by American rapper Tyga, and the fifth single from his mixtape Fuk Wat They Talkin Bout (2015). It was produced by Crakwav and uses a sample of "Children" by Robert Miles. The song is a response to the controversy and criticism surrounding Tyga's relationship with then underage media personality Kylie Jenner. Tyga was 25 years old while Kylie had just turned 18.

== Background and composition ==
In 2014, Tyga and Kylie Jenner began a romantic relationship, which Tyga publicly confirmed when Jenner turned 18 (the legal age of consent in California) in 2015. The news sparked controversy due to their age difference. Tyga responded to the negative publicity with the song, in which he dismisses the criticism of the relationship and describes his sexual exploits with Jenner, rapping over a sample of "Children" by Robert Miles.

== Reception ==
The song was widely criticized by music critics and the general public alike. It has been viewed as glorification of statutory rape. Many particularly disapproved of the line "They say she young, I should've waited / She a big girl, dog, when she stimulated". Casey Lewis of Teen Vogue wrote, "Beyond the words that would land you a week's worth of detention, Tyga is justifying – and possibly even glorifying – his illegal relationship with an underage girl." Ebony called "Stimulated" "the worst song anyone has ever created".

== Music video ==
The music video was released on YouTube August 31, 2015, although it was deleted from the site in 2018.

Taking place in an oceanside mansion, it begins with Tyga writing the song's lyrics on paper and rapping them, while seated on a couch. Kylie Jenner arrives in a bright green Bentley, sporting a green bomber jacket, white top, ripped jeans, and pink Christian Louboutin heels, as well as a Birkin bag, gold watch and jewelry. The couple meet up on a balcony above the beach, where they exchange hugs and kisses. Jenner briefly changes her outfit to a blue jumpsuit with a textured coat. Tyga also gives her a piggyback ride in the video.

== Charts ==
| Chart (2015) | Peak position |
|---|---|
| UK Hip Hop/R&B (Official Charts) | 36 |
| US Bubbling Under Hot 100 (Billboard) | 3 |
| US Hot R&B/Hip-Hop Songs (Billboard) | 41 |
