= Covet Fashion =

2013 video game

Covet Fashion is a mobile casual free-to-play dress up game for iOS and Android. It was initially launched on November 12, 2013. With over 150 real life brands formerly featured in game, users can dress up and style their model using clothes from real labels. They no longer work with brands and now only use Covet Fashion branded clothing. Users vote between looks and try to earn 5 star ratings. In 2020, they claimed to have 2 million monthly players.

== Notable collaborations ==
In December 2015, Emma Roberts was their first Covet Host.

In 2018, Covet collaborated with Disney with Cruella de Vil, the Evil Queen, and Maleficent themed clothing.

== Ownership ==
It was developed by Crowdstar. Their goal was to create games designed for women, a market that the chief executive Jeff Tseng at the time thought was underserved. Crowdstar was purchased by Glu Mobile in 2016 for $45 million. In 2021, it was purchased by Electronic Arts when they purchased Glu Mobile.
