= Beat It! =

2009 video game

- Developer(s): Glu Mobile
- Publisher(s): Glu Mobile
- Platform(s): iOS
- Release: December 3, 2009
- Genre(s): Rhythm game
- Mode(s): Single-player

Beat It! is a 2009 rhythm game developed and published by Glu Mobile and released on December 3, 2009, for iOS.

== Reception ==
On Metacritic, Beat It! has a "generally favorable" rating based on six reviews.

Multiple critics praised the game.
