= ColourPop Cosmetics =

Cosmetics brand

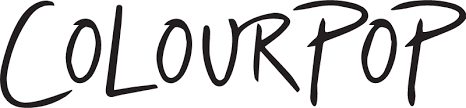
- Industry: Cosmetics
- Founded: 2014
- Founder: Laura Nelson; John Nelson
- Headquarters: Oxnard, California
- Parent: Seed Beauty
- Website: colourpop.com

ColourPop Cosmetics, also known as ColourPop, is an American cosmetics brand based in Oxnard, California. The company was founded in 2014 by siblings Laura and John Nelson. ColourPop products are sold through their website, at Ulta Beauty, and at Target. They predominantly make products for the eyes, lips, and face.

Their brand is known for their affordable pricing (many of their products range in price from $5-$20) and collaborations based on current trends in social media. Their makeup is also cruelty-free (meaning without the testing of animals.)

The company also has a skincare brand under the name Fourth Ray Beauty and a sister brand focused on body makeup called Sol Body.

ColourPop has won make up beauty awards from Glamour (2020), Allure (2019), Influenster (2018), Temptalia (2018, 2019), and OK! (2018).

== History ==
Sibling co-founders Laura and John Nelson started a parent company called Seed Beauty as an offshoot of their father's makeup company Spatz Laboratories, which produced makeup products for other brands. ColourPop Cosmetics is a brand owned by parent company Seed Beauty, which also used to own Kylie Cosmetics and KKW Beauty. The company started as an e-commerce business, then expanded to selling wholesale to retail stores as well. The brand's first retail partnership was with Sephora in 2017. In 2018, ColourPop became available in select Ulta Beauty stores.

On June 14, 2018, Colourpop released their first foundation called the No Filter Foundation in 42 shades. In September 2019, Colourpop released their first tinted moisturizer called the Hyaluronic Tinted Moisturizer.

== Collaborations ==
ColourPop has collaborated on collections with media brands such as Disney and Sanrio, and other properties such as Match.com and Halo Top Creamery.

ColourPop is also known for creating collaborative products with several YouTube and social media celebrities including Isabelle Fuhrman, Karrueche Tran, Zoella, Becky G, Alexis Ren, and Jenn Im. In October 2019, YouTuber Safiya Nygaard released her lipsticks with Colourpop based on her YouTube series 'bad makeup science' where she melted together lipsticks in her kitchen to make new shades.

In July 2022, ColourPop announced their collaboration with global K-pop sensation BTS which is inspired by the BT21 animated characters.

== See also ==
- Tarte Cosmetics
- Kylie Cosmetics
- Fenty Beauty
- Tati Westbrook
