= Fuk Wat They Talkin Bout =

Mixtape by Tyga
- Released: August 24, 2015
- Genre: Hip hop
- Length: 42:45
- Label: Last Kings Music
- Producers: Crakwav (also exec.); Dupri; Jess Jackson

Tyga chronology
The Gold Album: 18th Dynasty (2015)	Fuk Wat They Talkin Bout (2015)	Rawwest Nigga Alive (2016)

Singles from Fuk Wat They Talkin Bout
- 1. "Master Suite" Released: July 27, 2015; 2. "Don't C Me Comin" Released: August 10, 2015; 3. "Bu$$ing Out Da Bag" Released: August 17, 2015; 4. "Ice Cream Man" Released: August 24, 2015; 5. "$timulated" Released: August 31, 2015

Fuk Wat They Talkin Bout is a mixtape by American rapper Tyga. It was released on August 24, 2015, by Last Kings Records.

== Track listing ==
No.	Title	Producer(s)	Length
1.	"Bu$$in Out Da Bag"	Crakwav	4:02
2.	"Glitta"	Crakwav	3:12
3.	"Master $uite"	Dupri	3:31
4.	"Turban$"	Crakwav	2:45
5.	"Death Row Chain"	Crakwav	2:42
6.	"A Voice 4rm Heaven Pt. 1 : 2Pac"		0:39
7.	"Rap $tar"	Crakwav	3:30
8.	"Interlude: Broke&Bitter.com"		1:58
9.	"$timulated"	Crakwav	3:44
10.	"Ice Cream Man"	Jess Jackson	3:06
11.	"$upawifey"	Crakwav	3:21
12.	"Don't C Me Comin'" (featuring A.E.)	Dupri	2:30
13.	"Clarity"	Dupri	3:25
14.	"A Voice 4rm Heaven Pt. 2 : Michael Jackson"		0:41
15.	"$candal"	Crakwav	3:39

== Weekly charts ==
Chart (2015)	Peak position
US Independent Albums (Billboard)	24
US Top R&B/Hip-Hop Albums (Billboard)	24
US Top Rap Albums (Billboard)	23
