= QuizUp =

Mobile game

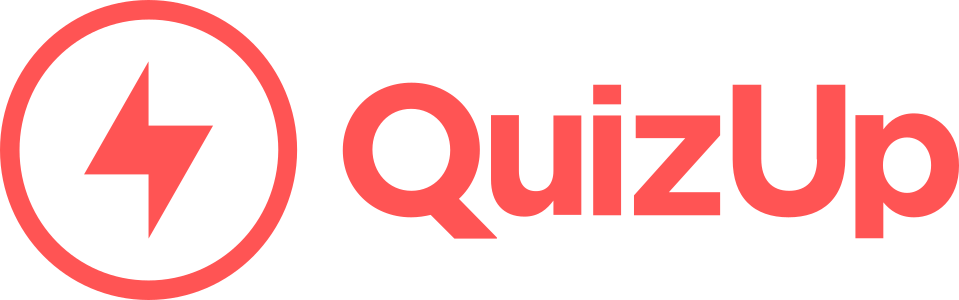
- Developers: Plain Vanilla Games (2013–2016); Glu Mobile (2016–2021)
- Publishers: Plain Vanilla Games (2013–2016); Glu Mobile (2016–2021)
- Platforms: iOS; Android; Windows Phone
- Release: iOS; 7 November 2013; Android; 6 March 2014; Windows Phone; 18 June 2015
- Modes: Single-player, multiplayer

QuizUp is a discontinued mobile game originally developed and published by Iceland-based Plain Vanilla Games and later operated by Glu Mobile. The game was a mobile trivia app similar to the game Trivial Pursuit. QuizUp was a multiplayer game where one user competes against another in seven rounds of timed multiple-choice questions of various topics. There were over 1,200 total topics available to users to choose from, and all the questions were voluntarily submitted by content contributors. Most topics were available in several different languages.

== History ==
QuizUp was initially released for iOS in November 2013. Plain Vanilla Games released an Android version in March 2014.

As of May 2014, QuizUp had 20 million users and had raised over $26 million from venture capital investments. Over a billion matches had been played in over 197 countries by March 2014. The company claims that users play an average of 40 minutes each day. On 30 September 2015, Plain Vanilla Games announced that they had reached a deal with Universal Television, the production arm of NBC, for a 10-episode television game show based on the app. Five days later, on 5 October 2015, it was announced that British channel ITV had also acquired the rights to their own game show version. Production began on the game show and the first episode was to air on 5 March 2017. However, the television show was scuttled by NBC in August 2016.

In September 2016, as a result of NBC cancelling their show, QuizUp's creator, Plain Vanilla, laid off all of their employees and announced a plan to sell the app before the end of 2016. QuizUp was acquired by mobile game developer Glu Mobile for $7.5 million USD, and the phrase "[QuizUp is] alive and kicking" was relayed to its community of players through the separate topic QuizUp: Feedback as well as through social media.

On 20 January 2021, QuizUp was removed from the App Store, and on 21 January 2021, it was announced on the QuizUp app that the game was being discontinued on 22 March 2021. On 24 March 2021, QuizUp's servers were taken offline and the application and web service became inaccessible, after several hours of delay.

== Gameplay ==
Users started a game by choosing a topic of interest from over 1000 available official categories in addition to custom topics created by users.

After the user picked a topic, they had the ability to either challenge a friend to a match or be paired against a random player. Users had the option of signing into the app through a social media platform such as Facebook, Twitter, or Google+ which allowed the user to see current friends who are using the app, invite friends to join them on the app, or challenge their friends to a game. Users also could choose to sign into QuizUp with an email address and not connect with a social media site. Players had the option of choosing to play with a friend or with a random stranger who may be in another country. When the user challenged someone, and the opposing user agreed to play, the match began. Each match consisted of six normal rounds and one bonus round that concluded the game. In each of the six normal rounds, the same question was given to each player with ten seconds to choose an answer out of the four responses provided. Users were awarded for the accuracy and speed of their answer, with a maximum of 20 points awarded per round. Point totals were doubled during the bonus round. Answering slowly or not giving an answer at all resulted in reduced points or no points respectively. The user earned one point fewer per second that they waited, with a minimum of 11 points if they answered correctly. Incorrect answers earned zero.

The maximum points possible to be scored in a single game was 160 [(6 rounds x 20 points)+(1 bonus round x 40 points)]; the player with the most points won the match.
