= Ancient Empires (series) =

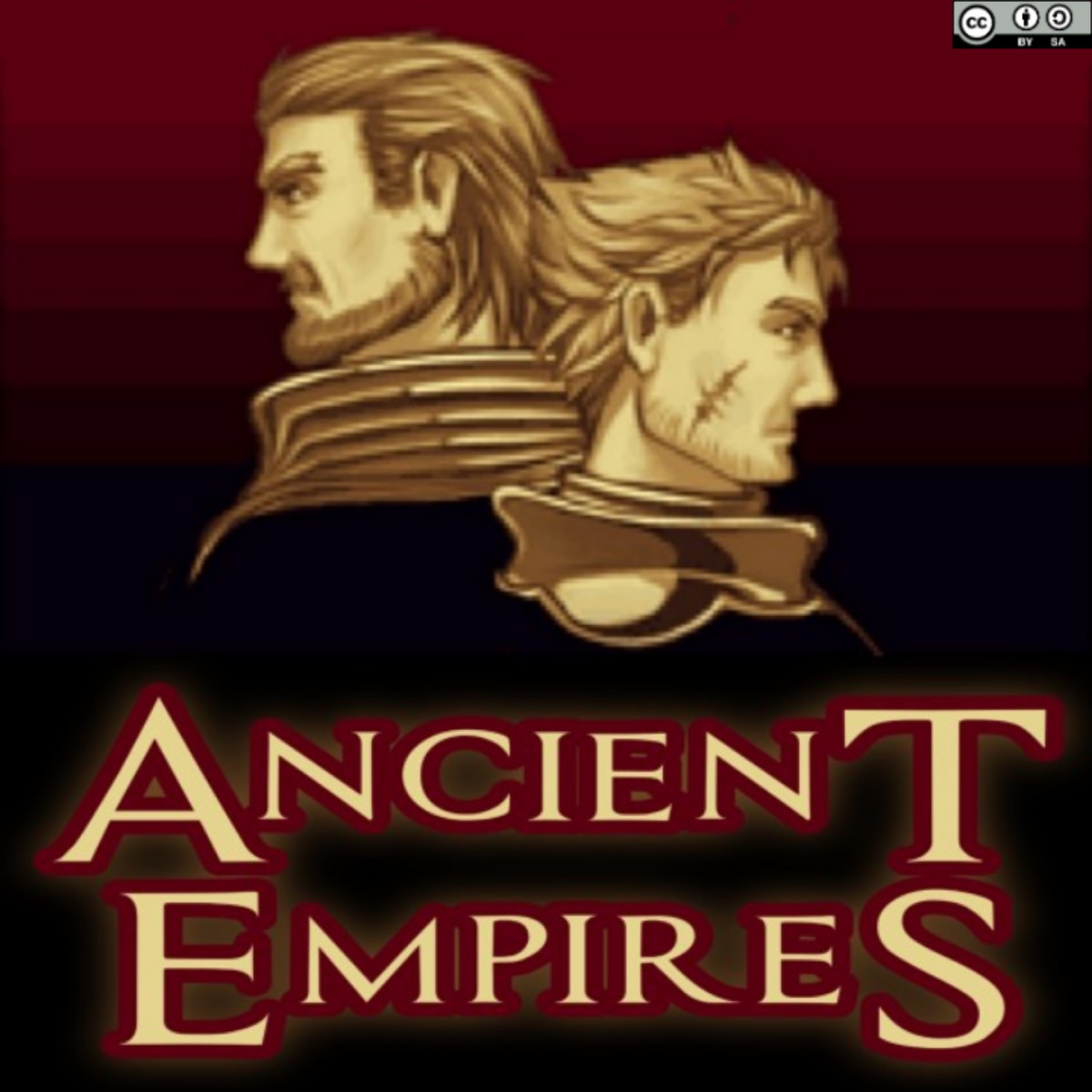
- Poster for the Ancient Empires game series
- Developer: Macrospace
- Publishers: Macrospace (AE 1); Sorrent (AE 2)
- Platform: Mobile phone
- Release: March 4, 2004 (AE 1); June 17, 2005 (AE 2)
- Genre: Turn-based tactics
- Modes: Single player, Multiplayer

Ancient Empires is a fantasy turn-based tactics game series developed by Macrospace for cell phones. The first game Ancient Empires was published by Macrospace on March 4, 2004; its immediate sequel Ancient Empires II was published by Sorrent on June 17, 2005.

== Gameplay ==
The games are played on a 2D landscape filled with grass, trees, mountains, rivers, etc. The player(s) and the computer control armies separated into squads. All squads have the same number of "hitpoints" (10 in the first game, 100 in the second). Most units can only attack targets in adjacent cells in main compass directions (north, south, east, and west). Several are able to attack at range and diagonally. Combat consists of one unit attacking another, then the target retaliates (adjacent main directions only). Having a castle on the level allows the player to purchase additional units from it. The first game requires the player's king to be in the castle for this to happen. This restriction has been removed in the sequel. The standard victory condition for the first game is to kill the enemy king, who is usually found at the castle, making him doubly difficult to kill. In the second game, the kings (called commanders) take a more active role in the gameplay, as they are not required to stay at the castle. Commanders are now able to be purchased at the castle after they are killed (their price depends on the number of times they have died). Units gain experience in attacking enemies. Units with low HP may be placed in a castle or a town to heal (20% of full HP is restored per turn).

Different types of terrain give different defence and movement bonuses to units in them. For example, roads give no defence bonus, as they are good places to be ambushed, but allow a unit to move further per turn. Alternatively, a mountainous area gives a lot of defence bonuses as the enemy must fight uphill, but they are difficult to traverse.

== Story ==
=== Part 1 ===
The game takes place in a fantasy medieval kingdom of Thorin ruled by the benevolent King Galamar. The game begins with Galamar barely escaping a bloody coup by his younger brother Valadorn, who has taken control of the kingdom and declared a hunt on his brother. Galamar has few troops with him, and he is constantly being attacked by Valadorn's Red Legion. In the first part of the campaign, Galamar has to gather allies in order to strike back at his brother. These allies include the Lizard King, the Wizards of the Grey Tower, the Wyverns captured by Valadorn's forces, etc. Once Galamar defeats Valadorn for the last time, he realizes that his brother was under demonic control. The game ends with a cliffhanger.

=== Part 2 ===
The sequel begins almost immediately after the first game ends, as Galamar and Valadorn (free from spell) must now fight off a demonic invasion headed by the demon Saeth. The brothers split up in their attempt to defend their land. They find out that the demons focus their attacks on several temples and are stealing mystical crystals. They finally arrive to face Saeth himself, only to find that he has used the crystals to activate an ancient weapon of great power - Heaven's Fury. Now the brothers must use whatever forces they have with them to defeat Saeth's army and the great demon himself before he is able to destroy the kingdom with the weapon.

== Reception ==
IGN rated it 8.5 stars out of 10.

Pocket Gamer gave Ancient Empires II a rating of 4.5 stars out of 5 while IGN rated it 8.8 stars out of 10. The second installment also won runner-up award for Best Artistic Design by IGN in 2005.

The Academy of Interactive Arts & Sciences awarded Ancient Empires II with "Cellular Game of the Year" during the 9th Annual Interactive Achievement Awards.
