= By Far =

Bulgarian fashion brand

- Type: Limited company
- Industry: Fashion
- Founded: 2016; 10 years ago
- Founder: Valentina Ignatova; Sabina Gyosheva; Denitsa Bumbarova
- Headquarters: Sofia, Bulgaria
- Area served: Worldwide
- Key people: Christa-Maria Rousseva (CEO)
- Products: Ready-to-wear; handbags; footwear; perfume
- Revenue: ▲€30 million (2022)
- Number of employees: 60 (2022)
- Website: www.byfar.com

By Far (stylized in all caps) is a Bulgarian luxury ready-to-wear and leather goods brand. It was founded in 2016 by Valentina Ignatova, Denitsa Bumbarova and Sabina Gyosheva.

By Far primarily operates online, but it also has three flagship brick-and-mortar stores in Los Angeles, Shanghai and Beijing. Its products are designed between Sofia, Sydney and London, and are sold through more than 300 retailers worldwide, including Galeries Lafayette, Selfridges, Bloomingdale's, Nordstrom, Net-a-Porter, Farfetch and Harrods.

== History ==
Founded in 2016 by Sabina Gyosheva, Valentina Ignatova and Denitsa Bumbarova, By Far emerged from an idea conceived in 2015 when Bumbarova's spouse, commissioned for a solar panel installation at a shoe factory in the Bulgarian town of Peshtera, presented her with production cost details for leather shoes. The brand's name, By Far, is an amalgamation of the initials of the co-founders' sons: Filip, Alek, and Roman.

Shortly after its inception, By Far began selling its shoes at a temporary pop-up store in London. Within one year, By Far's shoes were stocked by 35 high-end stores across the world. In 2018, By Far added leather bags to its product portfolio.

By 2022, By Far's accessories had brought in over 30 million in annual revenue. In the same year, the company opened its first flagship store at 8408 Melrose Place in Los Angeles, as well as a second one in Shanghai. In 2022, By Far launched its debut fragrance, Daydream, alongside a short film starring Kendall Jenner.

In 2023, By Far opened a second store in China, in Beijing, and launched its fragrance collection at fifteen Nordstrom stores across the United States. That same year, By Far expanded into ready-to-wear clothing.

== Collaborations ==
In 2020, By Far released a circular collection of reworked pieces in collaboration with French second-hand platform Vestiaire Collective. In 2021, By Far collaborated with American celebrity stylist Mimi Cuttrell, and released a capsule collection of nine handbag and shoe pieces.
