= Thor Fridriksson =

Icelandic businessman

- Born: Þorsteinn Baldur Friðriksson; June 30, 1979 (age 47); Reykjavík, Iceland
- Education: University of Oxford (MBA, 2009)
- Known for: Plain Vanilla Games

Þorsteinn Baldur Friðriksson (born 30 June 1979), commonly anglicised as Thor Fridriksson, is an Icelandic businessman. He was the founder and chief executive officer (CEO) of Plain Vanilla Games, a Reykjavík-based video game developer, until its defunction in August 2016.

== Personal life ==
Thor was born in Reykjavík on 30 June 1979. He graduated from the Menntaskólinn í Reykjavík in 1999 and studied at Reykjavik University.

== Career ==
Thor was working with the broadband-ISP startup Hive until it was purchased by Vodafone in 2007. Deciding to explore a different industry, Thor became a local TV news reporter. After studying at the University of Oxford, Thor started Plain Vanilla Games in Reykjavík during the Icelandic financial crisis. Thor and his team at Plain Vanilla Games spent over a year developing an educational app for children called The Moogies, that failed to gain popularity on the App Store. Despite the country's economic issues, Thor decided to keep the Plain Vanilla Games' headquarters located in Reykjavík to help support job growth and other start-up companies.

In June 2020, Thor released a new game titled Trivia Royale that "lets users compete in a 1,000-person, single-elimination trivia tournament."

In 2022, Thor launched a new gaming platform, Rocky Road, which debuted a "hyperlocal social mobile gaming experience" in Iceland, and subsequently raised $5.2 million from Luminar Ventures, Crowberry Capital, Sisu Ventures and David Helgason, the founder of Unity Technologies.
