= Sinful Colors =

Nail polish company

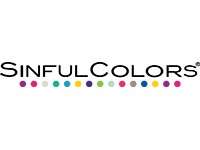
- Product type: Nail polish
- Current owner: Revlon
- Country: United States
- Introduced: 1991
- Previous owners: Mirage Cosmetics

Sinful Colors is an American nail polish company owned by Revlon.

== Background ==
Sinful Colors was founded in 1991.

In March 2011, Mirage Cosmetics, the owners of Sinful Colors, was purchased by Revlon for 39 million dollars.

In December 2013, Revlon announced it was exiting the Chinese cosmetic market, thus pulling Sinful Colors off the Chinese shelves.

== Organization ==
The company's headquarters is located in New York, NY.

== Products ==
In 2016, Sinful Colors partnered with Kylie Jenner to launch a nail polish collection. In 2018, the brand partnered with Vanessa Hudgens to create a nail polish collection, and named her Global Color Collaborator of Sinful Colors.

In 2020, they came out a new product called the CLAWS. It is a Japanese beauty-inspired, limited-edition collection with press-on nails featuring Bebe Rexha’s designs.

They also came out with a sneaker-inspired collection with neon shades and a rubber-like matte finish. They are sold at Target.

The Sinful Colors Sweet and Salty collection was released in 2020. It was inspired by snack foods, including tacos, cheese puffs, and donuts. The final Sinful Colors collections were Essenchills--a scented line inspired by self-care--released in early 2021, and Candy Wonderland--inspired by holiday sweets and desserts--released for the 2021 holiday season.

On June 16, 2022, Revlon--Sinful Colors' parent company--filed for Chapter 11 bankruptcy.
