= Indestructible (video game) =

2012 video game

- Official Google Play icon
- Developer: Glu Mobile
- Platforms: iOS; Android
- Genre: Vehicular combat
- Modes: Online multiplayer Offline single-player

Indestructible is a freemium vehicular combat video game developed by Glu Mobile for iOS and Android mobile devices (2012).

== Gameplay ==
The game contains four gameplay modes: Team Death Match, Capture The Flag, Recover The Charge, and Death Match. The gameplay objective of each mode is different depending on the mode that is chosen; the primary objective is to use the player's vehicle to destroy the vehicles of other players, although depending on the game mode, there may also be other objectives. A match ends when a certain predetermined score is met, for example, 5 kills in "Team Death Match" mode. Indestructible supports online multiplayer in "matches" of up to four players, with two players in a team (except in Death Match, where all the players play for themselves). An offline single-player campaign and "practice" mode with endless waves and rewards is also available. During matches, power-up boxes may periodically spawn on the game's map; driving into the green one that has a wrench sign on it result in armor (which refers to health) repair for a fixed amount while driving into the red one with a 2x sign on it results in double damage output for the next 10 seconds, the boosted weapon will also flash red until the effect wears off. The game features several vehicles, weapons and gadgets, which can be customized to a player's needs, though they need to be bought first, the player starts off with one, only one vehicle can be won for free when the player completes the campaign. There are also daily objectives where the player can be rewarded for completion of them. If any player including the AI somehow gets beyond the boundaries of the arena, they will be destroyed instantly and will contribute to their respective opponent's kills. Before entering the campaign, you will be shown with a statistic comparison between your current vehicle and your opponent's vehicle, and offers an option to change arsenal before entering the combat if the player wishes. Melee weapons only deal damage upon impact whist other weapons fire with universal ammunition depicted as "energy" in-game which recharges over time, when you are enervated in a battle, weapons can't function normally. Each vehicle owns a unique active ability that can be utilized in battle at the cost of a fixed amount of energy and has a constant recharge, there's also a passive ability for each vehicle. Gadgets can affect your combat positively, like health, energy, and a number of other categories whist some others increases weapon damage of certain types, there are even self-heal gadgets, all players are only allowed 3 gadgets per vehicle, gadgets can be used on all vehicles for a single purchase. All weapons and gadgets have an occupation requirement, ones exceeding the limit will not be allowed to mount, though some gadgets can help increase the capacity. The info page of a vehicle contains details mentioned previously and a bar depicting either the said vehicle has defensive/offensive advantages or is simply a balanced vehicle. In-game paint jobs for the vehicles are also available, being three for each vehicle including the default one and two extra ones that must be purchased, they only serve as cosmetic purposes though. Players can also purchase special ammo that can boost weapons depending on type in combat. Entering a combat costs one section of fuel while the max allowed is five, otherwise you are not allowed when you try to use an enervated vehicle, each vehicle possesses an individual fuel bar, the player can either refuel one section at some cost or get infinite fuel for 24 hours at five times of the former's cost for the vehicle. If they do neither, the fuel will slowly replenish and the time left will display near by. The Team Death Match is the most commonly played followed by Capture the Flag, Recover the Charge, and Death Match. In the IOS version of Indestructible, you can invite friends to play with you via game center. On the Android version, you cannot invite friends.

== Reception ==
Indestructible has received mostly positive reviews. Android Authority praised the game's 3D graphics and as well as the game's controls, calling them "great". Android Police's review was more mixed, with criticism being focused on the simple gameplay, the lack of an in-game penalty for leaving a match (which allows players to "bail" from a game freely), and slow progress, which results in "grinding". The game's freemium aspect, as well as the vehicles' "loose" controls, which means that "[the player] feels like you’re driving a propeller dinghy rather than a sleek, amped-up death machine" was also criticized. Androidtapp rated the game 3.8/5, with pros being the game's graphics, music, controls and vehicle upgrades, and the cons mainly consisting of the lack of strategy involved in the gameplay, summing Indestructible up as a "good game". Gamezebo scored Indestructible three stars out of five, commending the "cool" car designs and weapons, but found the controls to be poor, and criticized the fact that in order to obtain the best in-game items quickly, real money needs to be spent.
