= Rebels: City of Indra =

2014 novel by Kendall and Kylie Jenner

- The cover of Rebels: City of Indra
- Author: Maya Sloan; Kendall Jenner; Kylie Jenner
- Cover artist: John Vario Jr.; Anna Ismagilova; Colin Anderson; Nick Saglimbeni
- Language: English
- Genre: Young adult, science fiction, dystopian, adventure
- Publisher: Pocket Books; Gallery Books (distributed); Karen Hunter Publishing
- Publication date: June 3, 2014
- Publication place: United States
- Media type: Print (Hardcover, Paperback) e-Book (Kindle)
- Pages: 344
- ISBN: 978-1-4516-9442-0

Rebels: City of Indra (also known as Rebels: The Story of Lex and Livia or Rebels: City of Indra: The Story of Lex and Livia) is a 2014 science fiction/dystopian novel by Kendall Jenner, Kylie Jenner, and ghostwriter Maya Sloan.

== Background ==
Kylie spoke about the novel, saying "The fans seem to love it. That’s why we did it, [the characters]' names are Lexi and Livia. I think we wanted to make Lex more like me and Livia more like Kendall, and they kind of evolved into their own characters."

Main characters

- Lex and Livia Cosmo — are the twin daughters of Arnaud Cosmos and Delphia. Lex is a hard-scrabbled, bullheaded, tough-talking orphan while Livia is an indignant, bullheaded debutant orphan. They both have a small neon-green symbol on their eyes.
- Marius — is a semi-ineffectual pseudo-intellectual who runs about citing manners for Livia.
- The Governess — is Livia's beauty-obsessed debutante coach who gets her wrinkles removed yearly at the Rejuvenation Island Clinic

== Reception ==
Publishers Weekly gave a positive review: "Details about the two worlds the girls inhabit are creative, though the plot that emerges after they meet is rather predictable. Even so, abundant action — including a hair-pulling fight, a high-speed chase on flying machines, and an attack by hideous beings known as 'mutations' — provides momentum. Unresolved conflicts set the scene for the next installment."
