= Kylie Jenner =

American media personality and socialite (born 1997)

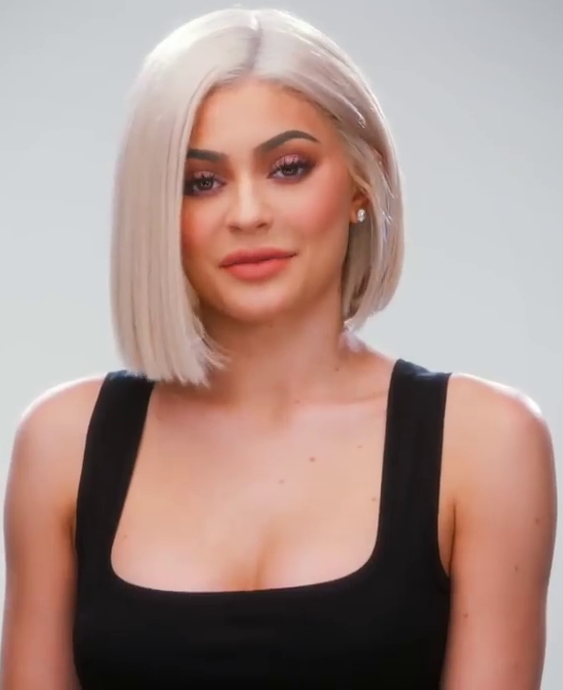
- Jenner in 2017
- Born: Kylie Kristen Jenner; August 10, 1997 (age 29); Los Angeles, California, U.S.
- Other name: King Kylie
- Occupations: Media personality; socialite; businesswoman
- Years active: 2007–present
- Partners: Travis Scott (2017–2023); Timothée Chalamet (2023–present)
- Children: 2
- Parents: Caitlyn Jenner; Kris Jenner (Note: Kris is Kylie's biological mother. Caitlyn came out as transgender and transitioned in 2015.)
- Relatives: Kendall Jenner (sister); Kourtney Kardashian (half-sister); Kim Kardashian (half-sister); Khloé Kardashian (half-sister); Rob Kardashian (half-brother); Brody Jenner (half-brother); Brandon Jenner (half-brother); See Kardashian–Jenner family

Signature
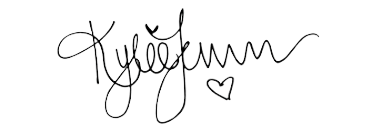

Kylie Kristen Jenner (born August 10, 1997) is an American media personality, socialite, and businesswoman. She starred in the E! reality television series Keeping Up with the Kardashians from 2007 to 2021 and the Hulu reality television series The Kardashians starting in 2022. She is the founder and owner of the cosmetics company Kylie Cosmetics. Jenner is the fifth-most-followed person on Instagram.

In 2012, at age 14, Jenner and her sister Kendall collaborated with the clothing brand PacSun to create a clothing line called Kendall & Kylie. In 2015, Jenner launched her own cosmetics line called Kylie Lip Kits, which was renamed Kylie Cosmetics the following year.

Jenner has been an influential figure in pop culture since the mid-2010s. In 2014 and 2015, Time magazine included the Jenner sisters on its list of the most influential teenagers in the world, citing their considerable influence among youth on social media. In 2017, Jenner was placed on the Forbes Celebrity 100 list, making her the youngest person to be featured on the list. Jenner also starred in her own spin-off series, Life of Kylie, which premiered in 2017. That year, she was selected for the Forbes 30 under 30 list in the Retail & Ecommerce category. In 2022, she was selected for the Forbes 30 under 30 Hall of Fame.

In 2019, Forbes estimated Jenner's net worth at $1 billion and called her the world's youngest self-made billionaire at age 21. Forbes later retracted the statement, writing that Jenner "likely forged" tax returns to create the impression that she was a billionaire.

== Early life ==
Kylie Kristen Jenner was born on August 10, 1997, at Cedars-Sinai Medical Center in Los Angeles, California, the youngest daughter of former Olympic decathlete champion Caitlyn Jenner and television personality and businesswoman Kris Jenner (née Houghton). Jenner has an older sister, Kendall, and eight older half-siblings. From Caitlyn's side of the family, she has three older half-brothers―Burt, Brandon, and Brody Jenner―and an older half-sister, Cassandra Marino. From Kris's side of the family, Jenner has three older half-sisters―Kourtney, Kim, Khloé―and an older half-brother, Rob Kardashian. Her parents divorced in 2015, before Caitlyn's gender transition.

Jenner attended Sierra Canyon School, where she was a member of the cheerleading team. She claims to have performed in plays while attending school, along with community plays. In 2012, she became homeschooled and enrolled in an at-home education program, from which she graduated with a high school diploma in July 2015 from Laurel Springs School in Ojai, California.

== Career ==
=== 2007–2012: Keeping Up with the Kardashians ===
In 2007, Jenner, along with her parents and siblings Kendall, Kourtney, Kim, Khloé, and Rob, began appearing in the reality television series Keeping Up with the Kardashians, which chronicles the family members' personal and professional lives. The series was successful for its network, E!, and resulted in the creation of numerous spin-offs, including Kourtney and Kim Take Miami, Khloé & Lamar, Kourtney and Kim Take New York, and Kourtney and Khloé Take The Hamptons, in which Jenner has made multiple guest appearances. The sisters hosted Glee: The 3D Concert Movie at the Regency Village Theater in Westwood, Los Angeles in August 2011. Also in 2011, they were featured in Seventeen magazine's Style Stars of the Year, and selected as "Style Ambassadors" for the magazine. The two hosted the premiere of The Vow in Hollywood in February 2012. The Jenners also interviewed the cast of The Hunger Games premiere at The Nokia Theatre in Los Angeles in March 2012. Later in 2012, Kylie, Kendall, and Kris Jenner starred in an episode of American reality television series America's Next Top Model.

=== 2013–2014: Early ventures ===
The Jenner sisters co-hosted the 2014 Much Music Video Awards, where Kylie made her acting debut in a promo for the show in Toronto, Ontario, Canada, in June 2014. In August 2014, the Jenner sisters appeared in singer PartyNextDoor's "Recognize" music video. She also appeared in Jaden Smith's music video for his song "Blue Ocean". Jenner and her sister Kendall co-authored the dystopian science fiction novel Rebels: City of Indra: The Story of Lex and Livia, which revolved around two twin girls, Lex and Livia, in a "self-sustaining biosphere" put together from the remains of Earth known as Indra. The novel was criticized upon release as a ghostwritten work, which prompted its ghostwriter Maya Sloan to reveal that while the Jenner sisters wrote a two-page outline of what they wanted the novel to be like, Sloan wrote the book. But the Jenners' creative director, Elizabeth Killmond-Roman, clarified that the two had numerous Skype and FaceTime calls with Sloan to discuss the content of the novel. The novel was mostly panned by critics, and sold only 13,000 copies in its first four months on sale. It has a sequel, Time of the Twins, also co-authored by the Jenner sisters.

=== 2015–2018: Rise of Kylie Cosmetics ===
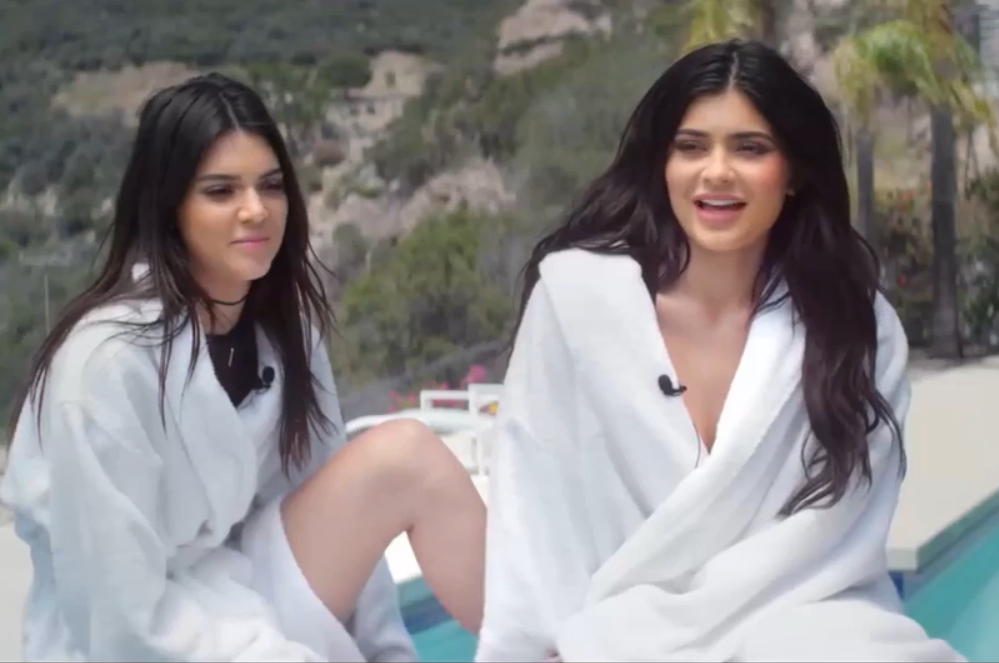
Kendall (left) and Kylie Jenner in 2016

The Jenner sisters were booed while introducing brother-in-law Kanye West's performance at the Billboard Music Awards in May 2015. In May 2015, an episode of Keeping Up with the Kardashians premiered in which Jenner admitted to getting a lip augmentation. Her enhanced lips from lip fillers created speculation and gained her publicity. Before the episode debuted, Jenner had said she merely used lip liner and over lined her lips. As a result, the practice of suctioning one's lips into a small glass in order to induce greater blood flow to swell them was called the "Kylie Jenner Challenge" (though there was no indication that Jenner used this method). Jenner responded, "I'm not here to try & encourage people/young girls to look like me or to think this is the way they should look." In August 2015, she announced that she would launch her first lipstick line as a part of her self-titled lip kit under the name Kylie Lip Kit. In November 2015, the Jenner sisters appeared in singer Justine Skye's "I'm Yours" music video.

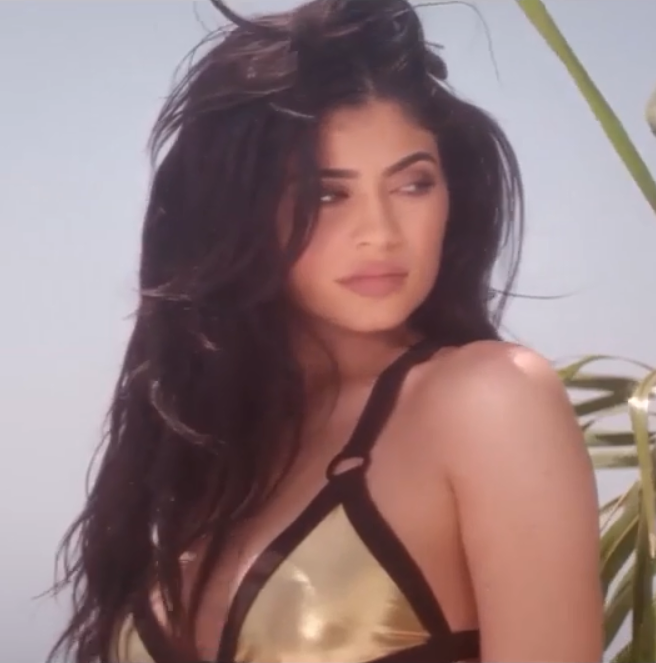
Jenner in 2016

In February 2016, Jenner's cosmetic company was renamed to Kylie Cosmetics and the number of kits produced rose from an initial 15,000 to 500,000. Jenner released a three-minute-long promotional video for a series of lip glosses in March 2016, directed by Colin Tilley and starring fellow models Karin Jinsui, Mara Teigen, and Jasmine Sanders. The song in the video was revealed to be "Three Strikes" by Terror Jr, a band created on the same day as the release of the video; however, the lead singer, who was later revealed to be singer Lisa Vatale, was heavily speculated to be Jenner herself. However, Jenner subsequently denied any involvement with the band. In May 2016, she made her musical debut rapping on producer Burberry Perry's song "Beautiful Day", with Lil Yachty, Jordyn Woods, and Justine Skye. The next month, Jenner starred in another PartyNextDoor's music video for his song "Come and See Me". In April 2017, she made a surprise appearance at the Rio Americano High School prom in Sacramento alongside junior Albert Ochoa after hearing that his date had turned him down.

In June 2017, Jenner was placed at number 59 on the Forbes Celebrity 100, which calculates the 100 highest-paid celebrities of the previous 12 months, after earning approximately $41,000,000, making her the youngest person on the list at 19 years old.

Jenner starred in a reality show revolving around her life, Life of Kylie, which premiered in August 2017. On mother's day 2018, Kylie Cosmetics launched makeup line called Kris Cosmetics, in collaboration with her mother Kris Jenner. Jenner and her half-sister Kim Kardashian launched their second collaboration KKW x Kylie Cosmetics collection on Black Friday 2018 after previously launched the first collection in 2017. The same month, she launched Kylie Cosmetics mobile app.

=== 2019–2020: Debut of Kylie Skin ===
In April 2019, Jenner and her half-sister Kim Kardashian's KKW Beauty teamed up to launch a new fragrance. This collaboration became Jenner's first foray into fragrance and it launched on April 26. Jenner founded her own skincare brand Kylie Skin which was launched on May 22. The brand began producing dermis products, including face washes, scrubs, moisturizers and makeup removing wipes. On June 14, 2019, Kylie Cosmetics launched their collaboration with her half-sister Khloé Kardashian called Kylie Cosmetics x Koko Kollection. This marked their third collaboration after previously launched special collection of lip products called Koko Kollection in 2016 and the second part in 2017. In September, Jenner announced that she was serving as the makeup artistic director for Balmain's Spring 2020 runway show at Paris Fashion Week. To celebrate the new line, Kylie Cosmetics and Balmain launched a capsule makeup collection and available on September 27, the day of the show, on the Kylie Cosmetics website. This was the first time Jenner collaborated on a makeup collection with someone outside of her family's inner circle.

In October 2019, Jenner filed to trademark the phrase "rise and shine", a line that became a meme when footage of Jenner singing the phrase to her daughter, Stormi, went viral. The hashtag #RiseandShine reached one billion views on TikTok, making it the platform's fastest-growing hashtag trend. In addition to the standard "rise and shine", Jenner also filed to trademark "riiise and shiiinnee". The latter trademark would cover clothing while the former would also apply to cosmetics. The next month, Jenner sold a 51 percent stake in Kylie Cosmetics to Coty, which owns other beauty brands including Covergirl, OPI, Rimmel, GHD and Clairol for $600 million.

In January 2020, Jenner announced she had trademarked Kylie Con, Kylie Kon, and Kylie Museum. In the same month, her sister Kendall confirmed that a cosmetics line in collaboration with Jenner's Kylie Cosmetics was in the process. Kylie Cosmetics launched Kylie Cosmetics x Kendall Jenner on June 26, 2020. Still in the same month, Jenner announced that Kylie Cosmetics will launch a Valentine's Day Collection named after Jenner's daughter, Stormi. The Stormi Collection was launched on February 1, the same day as her daughter's birthday. Jenner made a cameo appearance in singers Ariana Grande and Justin Bieber's "Stuck with U" music video in May 2020. The following month, the Jenners sisters addressed reports that their fashion brand Kendall + Kylie has failed to pay factory workers in Bangladesh as a result of the COVID-19 pandemic. It was reported that Global Brands Group (GBG) previously listed the Kendall + Kylie brand on its website. As a result, the Jenners stated that their company is owned by a separate entity known as 3072541 Canada Inc. even though they say that their brand "has worked with CAA-GBG in the past, in a sales and business development capacity only" and that they "do not currently have any relationship at all with GBG". In August 2020, Kylie Cosmetics launched Summer Sailor collection which marked the launch of Jenner's first-ever false lashes. In the same month, she made a cameo in Cardi B and Megan Thee Stallion's "WAP" music video, alongside singers Normani and Rosalía; a petition asking that Jenner's cameo be edited out of the video reached over 65,000 signatures.

Jenner topped the Forbes list of highest paid celebrities for 2020.

=== 2021–present: Business, television and film projects ===
In 2020, Jenner and her family announced that their reality show, Keeping Up with the Kardashians, would be ending after twenty seasons and almost 15 years on the air.

In September 2021, Jenner launched Kylie Swim, a swimwear line that includes sizes for all women. The line received backlash on social media, with people saying that the products were poor quality and impractical. The same month, Jenner announced a new skincare and hair product line for infants called Kylie Baby.

In January 2022, Jenner became the first woman to gain 300 million followers on Instagram, surpassing the previous recordholder, singer Ariana Grande.

In April 2022, Jenner and her family returned to television with a new reality television show, The Kardashians, on Hulu. The show features Jenner, her sisters Kourtney, Kim, Khloe, and Kendall, and her mother Kris Jenner. It also features Jenner's former and current partners, including Scott Disick, Travis Barker, Tristan Thompson, and Corey Gamble, with Kanye West making a guest appearance. The first season premiered on April 14, 2022, and its ten episodes can be streamed exclusively on Disney+. The show's second season premiered on September 22, 2022, and its third season premiered on May 25, 2023.

In 2024, Jenner launched her clothing line Khy. She collaborated with the French fashion designer Antonin Tron to create a capsule collection. She also launched a canned cocktail called Sprinter the same year.

Jenner made her acting debut in the 2026 film The Moment, produced by Charli XCX and Studio365.

In March 2026, Jenner was featured on the Yeat album ADL.

On October 18, 2026, Jenner made her runway debut at the 2026 Victoria's Secret Fashion Show at Sony Pictures Studios in Los Angeles, wearing the record-breaking $50 million Fantasy Bra.

== Activism and philanthropy ==
In October 2020, Jenner expressed support for the Republic of Artsakh in an Instagram story, as well as reposting Kim Kardashian's video message related to donations to the All-Armenian Foundation.

Jenner set up an eBay account where she auctions old clothing to raise money for the Children's Hospital Los Angeles. She joined her sisters Khloé and Kendall, along with Lil Twist, and The Game at PINZ bowling alley in Studio City, California for a charity bowling game on January 19, 2014. The event was held to raise money for The Robin Hood Foundation, a nonprofit for which The Game pledged to raise $1 million in donations. The Jenner sisters participated in singer Chris Brown's two Kick'n It For Charity Celebrity Kickball games in Glendale, California on July 19 and August 16, 2014. At the first game, she competed on actor/singer Quincy Brown's team.

In December 2015, Jenner made a donation of Christmas gifts to the Los Angeles LGBT Teen Center. In January 2017, Jenner donated $10,000 to her then-friend Jordyn Woods to help cover memorial costs for Woods's father after he died from cancer. On her birthday in the same year, Jenner announced on her Instagram she donated $500,000 from sales of her Birthday Collection to Teen Cancer America, an organization to help hospital and outpatient facilities develop special units for teens with cancer. Jenner is an ambassador for Smile Train, a charity that funds surgery for children with cleft lips and palates. She became one of the organization's youngest ambassadors. Jenner visited Peru with Smile Train on an episode of Life of Kylie. In 2016, Jenner launched a special-edition lip kit called "Smile", and donated $159,500 to Smile Train to fund cleft lip and palate surgeries for 638 deserving children. In September 2019, during her appearance on The Ellen DeGeneres Show, Jenner donated $750,000 to the founder and members of a feminist organization in Florida called Nest of Love, which is dedicated to mentoring young women, helping low-income kids in the community, and promoting female empowerment.

In January 2020, Jenner gave a total of $1 million to five organisations in Australia to help tackle the bushfires. In March 2020, Jenner, her mother Kris, along with beauty company Coty donated over 6,000 pounds of hand sanitizers to Southern California hospitals to help health care workers fighting the COVID-19 pandemic. Jenner also donated $1 million to buy face masks, face shields, and other protective gear for health-care professionals who work on the front lines.

== Controversies ==
=== Forbes cover ===
Jenner appeared on the cover of the August 2018 issue of Forbes. The magazine claimed she had a net worth of $900 million and that she was on the verge of becoming the youngest "self-made" billionaire, surpassing Mark Zuckerberg, who became a billionaire at age 23. Due to the use of the term "self-made," the publication received criticism, with critics noting that Jenner was born into her financial posture. Some discussions took a more serious tone, with journalists writing pieces on wealth distribution, inequality and inheritance, as well as upward mobility in society. But celebrities such as Jenner's half-sister Kim Kardashian and socialite Paris Hilton publicly defended Jenner, saying her success was indeed self-made, while Hilton, who was born into the Hilton family, also described herself as self-made.

=== Alleged forged tax documents ===
In May 2020, Forbes released a statement accusing Jenner of forging tax documents so she would appear as a billionaire. The publication also accused her of fabricating revenue figures for Kylie Cosmetics. The same day, Jenner responded in a series of tweets, writing: "What am I even waking up to? I thought this was a reputable site... All I see are a number of inaccurate statements and unproven assumptions lol. I've never asked for any title or tried to lie my way there EVER. Period". Jenner's attorney also requested that Forbes retract the statements, calling the magazine's accusations "unequivocally false". Forbes responded, stating that the publication spent months uncovering the facts and concluded that their "extensively-reported investigation was triggered by newly-filed documents that revealed glaring discrepancies between information privately supplied to journalists and information publicly supplied to shareholders".

In October 2020, Jenner became the youngest person on Forbes's list of 100 Richest Self-Made Women in October 2020. She is the only person on the list in her 20s, and is worth $700 million.

=== Underpaying factory workers ===
Remake, a nonprofit, identified Global Brands Group as the manufacturer of the Kendall + Kylie clothing line. The organization alleged that money was being withheld from workers in the factories despite having finished their work. The organization also reported the Jenners firing workers in Los Angeles, affecting over 50,000 workers. Jenner received criticism for this, with fans asking her to pay her workers. In response, the clothing line said that Kendall + Kylie was not owned by Global Brands Group.

=== Lawsuits and civil disputes ===
==== Vlada Haggarty ====
In January 2017, make-up artist Vlada Haggarty claimed that Jenner had stolen the creative style and aesthetic of her own work, such as the dripping gloss lip and golden finger tips, for her own products, and that Jenner had a history of taking Haggerty's original dripping lip art and passing it off as her own. Jenner later credited Vlada on social media and her work on the creation of the logo and an undisclosed settlement was paid to avoid any future legal issues.

==== "Kylie" trademark ====
In February 2017, Australian singer Kylie Minogue won a legal battle against Jenner for name trademark "Kylie". Jenner had filed a U.S. trademark application for use of the name "Kylie" for "advertising services" and "endorsement services" in 2015.

==== Neon lip logo ====
Sara Pope, a British painter whose work has been featured in art galleries in several cities across the globe, filed a lawsuit against Jenner and NBC Universal for the use of a neon lip logo. Pope stated that Jenner posted to her social media accounts an image that was remarkably similar to Pope's most famous piece, "Temptation Neon" and used it to promote Jenner's TV series Life of Kylie. TMZ reported that the production art created for the series, including the lip design, was created by a third party designer.

==== Workplace lawsuits ====
In 2026, three former household employees filed employment-related lawsuits naming Jenner as a defendant. The lawsuits alleged workplace harassment and discrimination, retaliation, wage violations, and other employment-related claims.

The first lawsuit was filed in April 2026 by former housekeeper Angelica Hernandez Vasquez, who alleged discrimination and harassment based on race, national origin, and religion, among other employment-related claims. The same month, a second former housekeeper, Juana Delgado Soto, filed a lawsuit also alleging racial discrimination, harassment, wage violations, and retaliation.

In June 2026, a former private chef filed a lawsuit alleging that she had been required to work strenuous shifts during a pregnancy described as high-risk despite requesting accommodations. The plaintiff further alleged that physical strain and workload contributed to a miscarriage. The complaint also alleged discrimination, harassment, wage violations, and wrongful termination.

== Endorsements ==
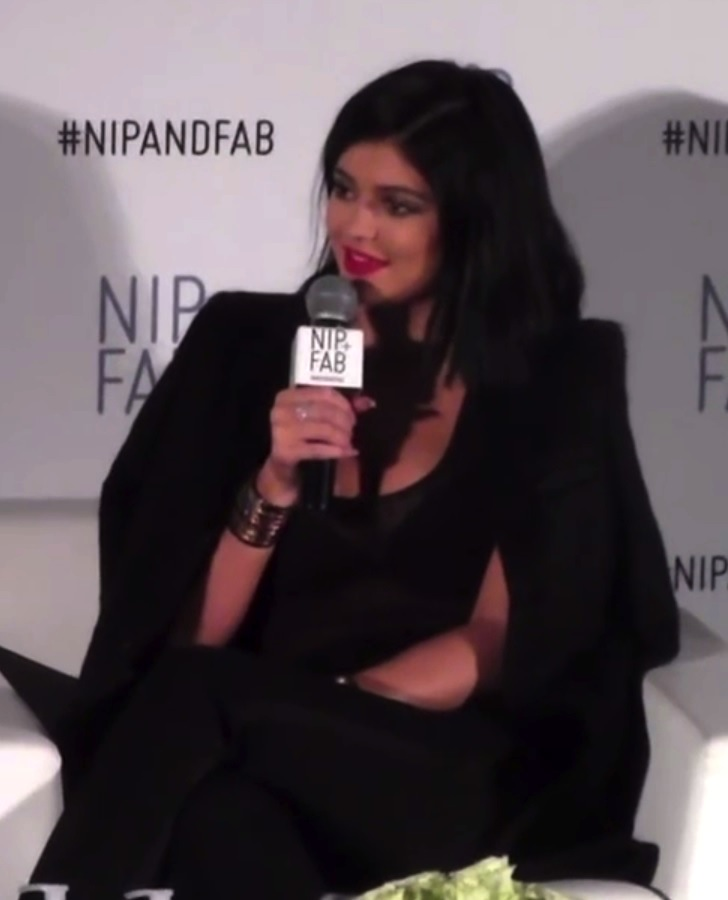
Jenner being interviewed for Nip + Fab in 2015

Jenner has two nail lacquers from the Nicole by OPI nail polish brand called Wear Something Spar-kylie and Rainbow in the S-kylie. Jenner and her sister Kendall earned $100,000 each for their OPI endorsements in 2013. On November 15, 2013, the Jenner sisters announced that they would launch The Kendall & Kylie Collection with PacSun which launched in February 2013. Since its conception, the sisters have released several collections for this line. In July 2013, the Jenner sisters launched a jewelry line with Pascal Mouawad's Glamhouse to create the Metal Haven by Kendall & Kylie jewelry collection.

In February 2014, she and Kendall launched a shoe and handbag line for Steve Madden's Madden Girl line. Jenner launched a line of hair extensions through a partnership with Bellami Hair, called Kylie Hair Kouture, in October 2014. She became skincare brand Nip + Fab's second-ever ambassador in March 2015. In June 2015, the Jenner sisters launched their clothing line Kendall + Kylie with British fashion retailer Topshop. This Topshop clothing line also featured swimsuits. In September 2015, the Jenner sisters launched their personalized website and mobile app, called Kendall and Kylie.

Jenner partnered with nail polish brand Sinful Colors and launched 20 pieces nail polish collection in 2016. In fall the same year, Jenner was announced to be the new face of PUMA along with Rae Sremmurd. In 2017, Jenner became the face of Beats Headphones special edition collection in collaboration between Apple and Balmain. Jenner collaborated with Melbourne-based sunglasses brand Quay Australia to release a line of sunglasses, Quay x Kylie. This collaboration launched in June 2017. She endorsed Calvin Klein along with her sisters in 2018. In the same year she signed a deal with Adidas to become their ambassador. Jenner also had endorsed hair vitamin SugarBearHair, Waist Gang Society waist trainer, monthly beauty subscription service Boxycharm, detox tea Fit Tea and Fashion Nova. In 2018, Jenner reportedly made $1 million per sponsored Instagram post, making her the highest paid individuals on Instagram in 2018. The next year Jenner reportedly made $1.2 million per sponsored Instagram post, remaining her as the highest paid individuals on Instagram for the second year in a row.

== Personal life ==
In 2011, Jenner dated Australian singer Cody Simpson.

In August 2014, Tyga was seen getting close with Jenner at her 17th birthday party. Days later, he ended his relationship with Blac Chyna, his fiancée and the mother of his son. In 2015, when Jenner turned 18, she and Tyga made their relationship official. Jenner appeared in two of Tyga's music videos, "Stimulated" and "Dope'd Up". In April 2017, Jenner and Tyga split.

In April 2017, Jenner was first seen with Travis Scott at Coachella. On February 1, 2018, Jenner gave birth to their daughter Stormi. Jenner appeared in the music video for "Stop Trying to Be God", from Scott's third studio album Astroworld. They broke up in September 2019, but quarantined together during the COVID-19 pandemic for their daughter's sake and rekindled their relationship. On September 7, 2021, after weeks of speculation, Jenner revealed that she and Scott were expecting a second child. Jenner gave birth to their son Aire on February 2, 2022. In January 2023, it was reported that the couple had split up again.

In April 2023, Jenner began a relationship with French-American actor Timothée Chalamet.

== Filmography ==
=== Film ===
Year	Title	Role	Notes	Ref.
2018	Ocean's 8	Herself	Cameo	
2026	The Moment	Herself		

=== Television ===
Year	Title	Role	Notes	Ref.
2007–2021	Keeping Up with the Kardashians	Herself	Main cast, 193 episodes	
2010, 2013	Kourtney and Khloé Take Miami	Herself	Guest, 2 episodes	
2012	America's Next Top Model, Cycle 18	Herself	Episode: "Kris Jenner"	
2012	Million Dollar Closets	Herself	Episode: "Pilot"	
2014	Deal with It	Herself	Episode: "Kendall & Kylie & Gary Owens"	
2014	Much Music Video Awards	Herself	Co-host	
2014	Kourtney and Khloé Take The Hamptons	Herself	Guest, 1 episode	
2014	Ridiculousness	Herself	Episode: "Kendall and Kylie Jenner"	
2015–2016	I Am Cait	Herself	Guest, 3 episodes	
2015	Kingin' with Tyga	Herself	Episode: "The Life"	
2017	Life of Kylie	Herself	Main cast, 8 episodes	
2020	Justin Bieber: Seasons	Herself	Cameo	
2021	Trolls: Holiday in Harmony	Penelopuff (voice)	TV special	
2022–present	The Kardashians	Herself	Main role	
2023	The Simpsons	Herself (voice)	Episode: "Treehouse of Horror XXXIV"	

=== Music videos ===
Year	Title	Artist	Role	Ref.
2013	"Find That Girl"	Boy Band Project	Love interest	
2014	"Recognize"	PartyNextDoor featuring Drake	Herself	
2014	"Blue Ocean"	Jaden Smith	Herself	
2015	"Stimulated"	Tyga	Love interest	
2015	"Dope'd Up"	Tyga	Love interest	
2015	"I'm Yours"	Justine Skye featuring Vic Mensa	Karaoke singer	
2016	"Come and See Me"	PartyNextDoor	Love interest	
2017	"Feel Me" (unreleased)	Tyga, Kanye West	Herself	
2018	"Stop Trying to Be God"	Travis Scott	Golden angel	
2020	"Stuck with U"	Ariana Grande and Justin Bieber	Herself	
2020	"WAP"	Cardi B featuring Megan Thee Stallion	Herself	
2026	"Residue"	A. G. Cook	Herself	

== Awards and nominations ==
Year	Award	Category	Work	Result	Ref.
2013	Teen Choice Awards	Choice TV Reality Star: Female	Shared With Female Cast of Keeping Up with the Kardashians	Won	
2014	Teen Choice Awards	Choice TV Reality Star: Female	Shared With Female Cast of Keeping Up with the Kardashians	Nominated	
2015	Teen Choice Awards	Choice Instagrammer	Kylie Jenner	Nominated	
2015	Teen Choice Awards	Choice Selfie Taker	Kylie Jenner	Nominated	
2015	Capricho Awards	Mais Estilosa	Kylie Jenner	Nominated	
2015	Capricho Awards	Snapchat	Kylie Jenner	Nominated	
2015	Capricho Awards	Bafo do ano	Boca da Kylie Jenner	Nominated	
2015	Capricho Awards	Real Couple of 2015	Kylie Jenner & Tyga	Nominated	
2016	Capricho Awards	Mais estilosa – internacional	Kylie Jenner	Won	
2016	Shorty Awards	Snapchatter Of The Year	Kylie Jenner	Nominated	
2017	Shorty Awards	Celebrity	Kylie Jenner	Nominated	
2017	Teen Choice Awards	Choice Instagrammer	Kylie Jenner	Nominated	
2017	Teen Choice Awards	Choice Snapchatter	Kylie Jenner	Nominated	
2017	Capricho Awards	International Fashionista	Kylie Jenner	Won	
2019	Teen Choice Awards	Choice Social Star	Kylie Jenner	Nominated	
2019	Streamy Awards	Best Collaboration	David Dobrik and Kylie Jenner	Won	
2020	Fragrance Foundation Awards	Fragrance of the Year Popular	Kylie Jenner by KKW Fragrance (Nude)	Won	
2020	Premios Juventud	Together They Fire Up My Feed (Couple or friends that appear on each other's feeds)	Rosalía and Kylie Jenner	Nominated	

== See also ==
- Famous for being famous
- List of most-followed Instagram accounts
