= Kylie Cosmetics =

American cosmetics company

Kylie Cosmetics, LLC
- Formerly: Lip Kit by Kylie (2014–2016)
- Type: Joint venture
- Industry: Cosmetics
- Founded: 2014; 12 years ago
- Founder: Kylie Jenner
- Headquarters: New York City, United States
- Area served: Worldwide
- Key people: Kylie Jenner (chairperson); Anna von Bayern (CEO)
- Products: Cosmetics; Beauty Products
- Owner: Coty (51%); Kylie Jenner (44.1%)
- Website: kyliecosmetics.com

Kylie Cosmetics, LLC is an American cosmetics company founded by Kylie Jenner. The company began selling Kylie Lip Kits, a liquid lipstick and lip liner set, on November 30, 2015. Formerly known as Lip Kit by Kylie, the company was renamed Kylie Cosmetics in 2016.

In 2018, Forbes reported that the company was valued at $800 million and in March 2019 valued the company at $900 million. Coty bought a 51% controlling stake in the company for $600 million in November 2019 valuing the company at approximately $1.2 billion. However, in early 2020 Forbes reported—citing documentation from the Coty deal—that Kylie Cosmetics had overvalued itself.

== Background ==
In 2014, Jenner and her mother Kris Jenner founded Kylie Cosmetics in partnership with Seed Beauty. The company's first product named Lip Kits, consisting of a liquid lipstick and lip liner, were released on November 30, 2015. The first 15,000 lip kits were produced by Seed Beauty and funded by Jenner at a cost of $250,000 from her modelling earnings. The company was renamed Kylie Cosmetics in February 2016, and production was increased to 500,000 kits. By the end of 2016, the company's total revenue was over $300 million.

Jenner has attributed inspiration for the brand to her former insecurity about her lip size saying, "It's the most authentic thing I've done in my career". Others have attribute the brand's success to Jenner's cosmetically altered lips.

== Business ==
=== Collaborations and collections ===
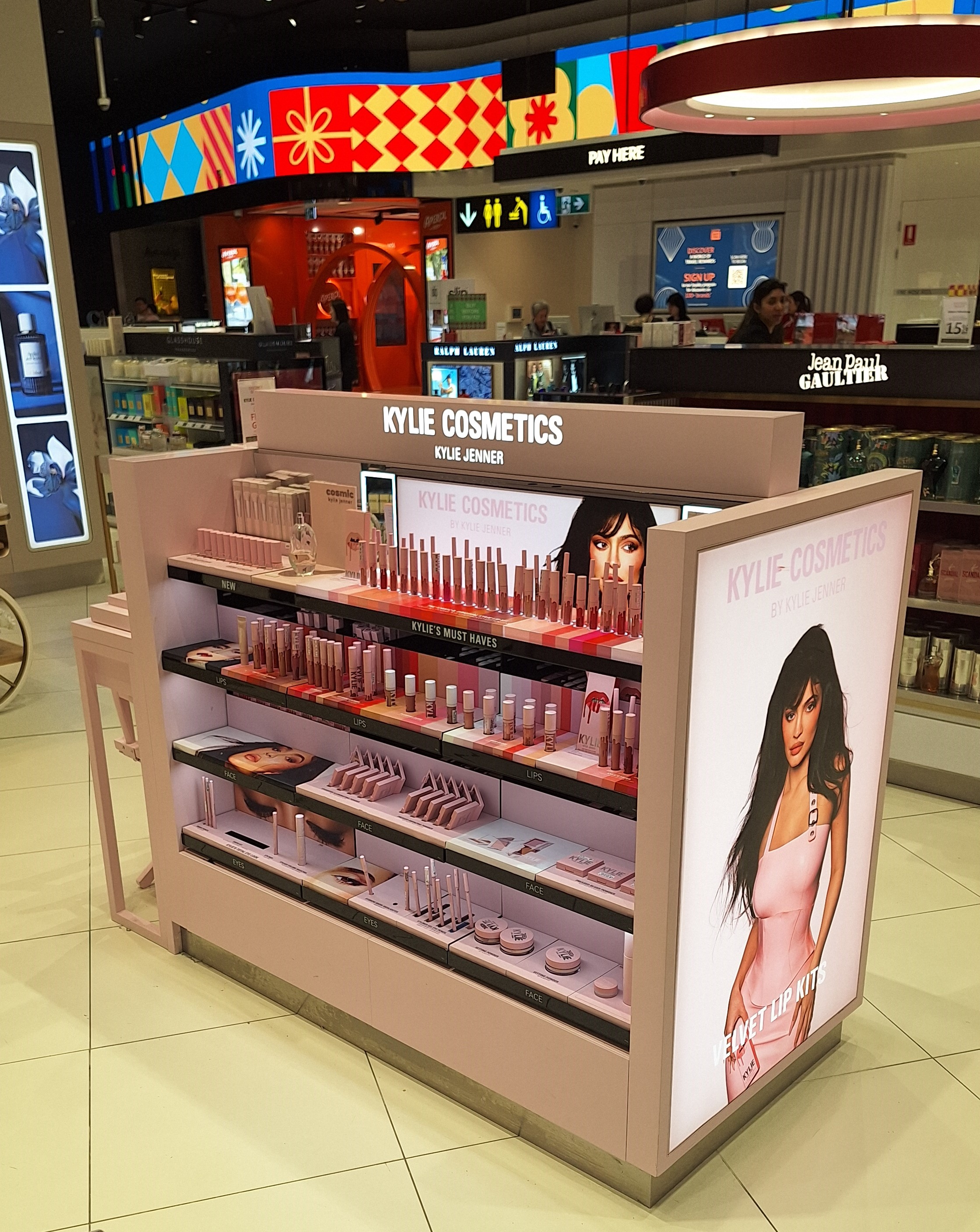
Kylie Cosmetics stand in duty free of Melbourne Airport, Australia

In April 2017, Jenner announced her collaboration with Kim Kardashian, called KKW X Kylie. In May, it was announced that Khloé Kardashian would be collaborating once again with the brand for a collection titled Koko. In a month long pop-up event in November of the same year, seven TopShop stores across the US sold Kylie Cosmetics products. In November 2018, Kylie Cosmetics products were made available for purchase at Ulta.

A year later, in April 2018, Jenner announced a collaboration with her half-sister Kourtney Kardashian, named Kourt X Kylie. On May 9, 2018, Kylie and Kris Jenner announced their collaboration called the Kris Kollection via Instagram. The Mini Lip Set in the Kris Kollection, which includes eight mini liquid lipsticks, is aptly named “Momager”, a title in which Kris Jenner has personally taken on, and attempted to trademark, in recent years. In addition to the "Momager" Lip Kit, the Kris Kollection includes lip glosses and a four pan pressed powder highlight/blush palette, which has created a lot of controversy online with both good and bad reviews. The collection was released just prior to Mother's Day.

The next year, Kylie announced her collaboration with Oliver Rousteing named Kylie X Balmain. It launched on September 27 of that year. In 2020, Kylie Cosmetics released a collaboration with The Grinch for Christmas. In October 2021, Kylie Cosmetics released a A Nightmare on Elm Street collaboration for Halloween. The following October, Kylie Cosmetics released a collaboration with Batman named Batman x Kylie.

In February 2026, Jenner collaborated with Kourtney Kardashian Barker’s wellness brand Lemme on the release of Lemme x Kylie Cosmetics Skin Glaze Gummies, an ingestible supplement formulated to support skin, hair, and nails.

==== Non-collaborative collections ====
In February 2018, Jenner released Kylie Cosmetics’ first non-collaborative collection named Weather. Jenner explained the collection is an ode to her daughter, Stormi, who inspired the collection and was born earlier that month.

=== Pop-up locations ===
Jenner previously made appearances at pop-up shops which were located inside Topshops.

=== Packaging ===
The 2016 redesign of the Kylie Lip Kit packaging

In May 2016, Kylie Cosmetics changed the packaging of its Lip Kits due to complaints of theft. Due to the easily recognizable packaging and high demand for the product at the time, some customers received empty boxes after having their products stolen in the mailing process. The original Kylie Lip Kit box was black with a white lip gloss drip design. In order to solve the theft issue, the boxes were changed to a basic black, and the recognizable dripping lip gloss design was moved to the inside of the box.

In the April 2018 release of the Kourt X Kylie Collection, Kylie Cosmetics included eyeshadow palettes with brand new plastic packaging rather than the traditional cardboard packaging.

=== Marketing ===
While Jenner or members of her family often serve as models of Kylie Cosmetics, the pair of lips that advertise the Lip Kits themselves belong to beauty and lifestyle blogger Ashley Rosales. Before entering the beauty community, Rosales served in the United States Army as a mechanic. Jenner revealed that she has enlisted her housekeeper and her former boyfriend Travis Scott to model swatches of the makeup on their arms for social media advertisements.

== Criticism ==
=== Expensive brush set ===
In an occurrence dubbed by Cosmopolitan Australia as the "Kylie makeup brush scandal of 2017", Jenner received backlash from fans, makeup gurus, and Internet users alike after Kylie Cosmetics launched a set of 16 luxury makeup brushes, priced at $360. After a few prominent YouTubers, including James Charles and Jeffree Star weighed in with their negative opinions on the price of the brush kit, Jenner responded via her personal Twitter, telling fans, "I hear you guys."

All 30 shades of Kylie Cosmetics' controversial concealer line

=== Concealer controversy ===
After the release of their concealer line, named Skin Concealer, Kylie Cosmetics received negative feedback from Internet users who claimed the company was copying Rihanna’s makeup line, Fenty Beauty. Though the intention of the makeup line was to remain inclusive, it was assumed by some that Jenner was profiting from diversity by including 30 shades in her concealer line.

It was also observed that all of the darker shades had red undertones, as explicitly described on the Kylie Cosmetics website, prompting the criticism that it did not cater to all skin types.

=== Eyeshadow Palette controversy ===
Back in 2017, Kylie Cosmetics received backlash after clients began reporting a strange and concerning smell from the brand's Royal Peach Eyeshadow Palette. This pungent smell was described as having a "chemical and glue" smell, with many comparing it to "spray paint" and "paint thinner".

=== Provocative names ===
The release of Kylie Cosmetics' March 2018 line of blushes sparked anger among some fans who thought that the names of some of the new products, such as "Barely Legal", "Virginity", "X Rated", and "Hot and Bothered", were too provocative, especially for Jenner's younger fans.

=== Company overvaluation ===
On April 8, 2020, Forbes again named Jenner as the world's youngest "self made" billionaire, citing her net worth having increased to $1.2 billion. However, in May, Forbes released a statement accusing Jenner of forging tax documents so she would appear as a billionaire. The publication also accused her of fabricating revenue figures for Kylie Cosmetics, citing documents Coty Inc (which had acquired a majority stake in Kylie Cosmetics) had released. The Forbes article concluded that Kylie Cosmetics was significantly smaller and less profitable than previously reported.

== See also ==
- ColourPop Cosmetics
- The Kardashians
