= Glyder 2 =

2009 video game

- Developer: Glu Mobile
- Platforms: iOS, Android, Maemo
- Release: December 16, 2009
- Genre: Adventure

Glyder 2 is a mobile tilt-control flying adventure game developed by Glu Mobile and released on December 16, 2009.

== Critical reception ==
The game has a rating of 93% on Metacritic based on 5 critic reviews.

AppSmile said "Replay value is very high, as the game itself is perfect for killing a few minutes or a few hours." SlideToPlay wrote "Glyder 2 is a Must Have for any flight game enthusiasts who just want to take it easy without being pinned down by a red-flashing control panel and a seating area full of screaming passengers." Pocket GamerUK said "Glyder 2 is a one-way ticket to fantastic gameplay, its combination of self-motivated exploration and dynamic goals ensuring a first class flight." 148Apps said "Technically the game is fantastic. The graphics are great, the controls are responsive and well done, and the soundtrack is just fantastic. The only real hick-up I found was the occasional heavy frame dropping on the mushroom world of Sporelle." TouchArcade said "Glyder 2 delivers a fanciful, aerial questing experience to your iPhone or iPod touch. It, like its forerunner, is a highly enjoyable game that's challenging, and at the same time, relaxing."
