= Kim Kardashian: Hollywood =

Role-playing game

- Developer: Glu Mobile
- Launched: June 24, 2014
- Discontinued: April 7, 2024
- Platforms: iOS, macOS, Android, Facebook

Kim Kardashian: Hollywood was a casual free-to-play role-playing game that was released on iOS and Android on June 24, 2014. It was discontinued on April 8, 2024. In the game, the player's goal is to increase their fame and reputation, starting on the E-list and rising to the A-list. The game was fronted by American media personality Kim Kardashian, featuring regular appearances from her character.

== Gameplay ==
In Kim Kardashian: Hollywood, players aim to increase their reputation by gaining fans in order to become A-List celebrities. Players can gain more fans by booking modeling jobs, acting jobs, club appearances, and going on dates. Actions taken during jobs and dates cost energy, which refills over time, but gain the player money and experience. High ratings on jobs and dates earn you more fans and increase your celebrity ranking. Although the game is free-to-play, in-game money and "K-Stars", which can be used to buy clothing, accessories, or refill your energy, can be purchased for a fee although you can watch a short video or ad to receive free K coins or energy.

== Development ==
The CEO of Glu Mobile, Niccolo De Masi, first approached Kim Kardashian about creating a mobile game in early 2013 while he was in Hollywood to negotiate multiple unrelated deals. The company wanted to make a casual roleplaying game that would "reuse engines but could add popular appeal," and felt that Kardashian was "the best brand fit in the world." The game took about 18 months to develop. Kardashian was involved in the development of the game, and according to De Masi, "[Kardashian] approved every item of clothing [used in the game], we discuss features, we discuss events, updates, etcetera. She reviewed all the [production] milestones, from alpha to beta, final gold master." In January 2024, the game was removed from App stores, and shut down completely on April 8, 2024.

== Release ==
Kim Kardashian: Hollywood was released on iOS and Android on June 27, 2014. In the first five days after its release, the game made $1.6 million. By mid-July, it was one of the top five games in the iOS App Store, and was the only game in the top ten to have a five star rating. By the end of its first quarter, it had 22.8 million players, had made $43.4 million, and had been played more than 5.7 billion minutes.

== Reception ==
Kim Kardashian: Hollywood received mixed reviews from critics. It holds a rating of 57 on Metacritic, based on 6 reviews, and 56.25% on GameRankings, based on 4 reviews. The game was named the 86th best game of the decade by Polygon.
