= Glu Mobile =

American video game developer

Glu Mobile LLC
- Formerly: Sorrent (2001–2005)
- Type: Subsidiary
- Traded as: Nasdaq: GLUU
- Industry: Video games
- Founded: 2001; 25 years ago
- Headquarters: San Francisco, California, U.S.
- Key people: Nick Earl (CEO and president)
- Revenue: US$411.4 million
- Number of employees: 800 (2021)
- Parent: EA Mobile (2021–present)
- Website: www.glu.com

Glu Mobile LLC is an American developer and publisher of mobile games. It was founded as Sorrent in 2001 and acquired Macrospace in 2004. Both companies collectively rebranded as Glu Mobile in 2005. In April 2021, the company was acquired by Electronic Arts and subsequently consolidated under EA Mobile.

== History ==
Glu Mobile was founded as Sorrent in 2001. In December 2004, Sorrent acquired the London-based Macrospace. In June 2005 the merged company created a new corporate name: Glu Mobile. That same year, Greg Ballard replaced Sorrent founder Scott Orr as CEO. In 2006, Glu Mobile acquired iFone, a mobile video game developer based in the United Kingdom. In 2007, it acquired Chinese mobile game producer Beijing Zhangzhong MIG Information Technology Co. Ltd. ("MIG"). In September 2007, Glu announced the launch of Asteroids for mobile phones. In March 2008, Glu acquired San Clemente-based mobile developer Superscape.

In January 2010, Niccolo de Masi joined Glu Mobile as the president and CEO. De Masi was previously CEO at Hands-On Mobile. Since his arrival, Glu has transitioned to a freemium business model focused around Glu's original IP.

On August 2, 2011, Glu acquired Griptonite Games and Blammo Games. Its staff of 200 "approximately double[d]" Glu's internal development capacity.

In April 2012, Glu acquired the entire Deer Hunter franchise.

Glu Mobile bought Gamespy Technologies (the entity responsible for GameSpy multiplayer services) from IGN Entertainment in August 2012, and proceeded in December to raise integration costs and shut down servers for many older games, including the Star Wars: Battlefront series, Sniper Elite, Microsoft Flight Simulator X and Neverwinter Nights, with no warning to developers or consumers. GameSpy Technologies remained operational and did not make any announcements of an impending shutdown; the two GameSpy companies were separate entities and only related by name. In April 2014, Glu announced that they would shut down all remaining Gamespy multiplayer services on May 31, 2014, which affected many older games, also the online multiplayer services on the game consoles Nintendo DS and Wii (via Nintendo Wi-Fi Connection).

On September 3, 2014, PlayFirst was acquired by Glu. The official statement from Glu Mobile CEO Niccolo de Masi read "We are pleased to officially add PlayFirst to the Glu family and look forward to delivering new DASH products to a worldwide audience."

In April 2015, Chinese company Tencent paid $126 million for a 15% stake in Glu Mobile. It had 20.8% as of 2017.

On November 4, 2016, Glu purchased the mobile app developer Crowdstar, buying their mobile games including Covet Fashion.

On December 22, 2016, it was announced that Glu Mobile had acquired the trivia game QuizUp for US$7.5 million. On January 20, 2021, QuizUp was removed from appstores, and on January 21, 2021, it was announced that QuizUp would be discontinued on March 22, 2021. Since then, all purchases are disabled.

In November 2016, Nick Earl became CEO. The majority stake of Glu shares are held by institutions: at the start of the third quarter of 2012, institutional ownership was 78% of the outstanding shares according to Google Finance.

Electronic Arts announced in February 2021 that it plans to acquire Glu in a deal estimated at US$2.4 billion. On the same day of the announcement of the deal, it was revealed that the companies expect the acquisition to close in the second quarter of 2021. In April 2021, EA completed the acquisition of Glu Mobile. Following the shutdown of EA Sports MLB Tap Sports and F1 Mobile Racing mobile games, EA announced it would lay off "a small number of staff" from Glu Mobile. Glu Mobile's 2021 Q4 earnings and revenues surpassed estimates.

== Games ==
- 1000: Find 'Em All
- 5-Card Draw Poker
- Adidas All-Star Football
- Age of Empires III Mobile
- ALIENS: Unleashed
- Alpha Wing 2
- Amazing Battle Creatures (ABC)
- Ancient Empires
- Ancient Empires II
- Aqua Teen Hunger Force
- Asteroids
- AstroPop
- ATV Off-Road Fury
- Baldur's Gate
- Battleship
- Beat It!
- Big Time Gangsta
- Blackjack Hustler
- Blood & Glory
- Blood & Glory 2: Legend
- Bombshells: Hell's Belles
- Bonsai Blast
- Brain Genius
- Brain Genius 2
- Brain Genius 2 Deluxe
- Brain Genius Deluxe
- Brian Lara International Cricket 2007
- Britney Spears: American Dream
- Bug Village
- Bush vs. Kerry Boxing
- Call of Duty 4: Modern Warfare
- Call of Duty: Black Ops Mobile
- Call of Duty: Modern Warfare – Force Recon (based on Call of Duty: Modern Warfare 2)
- Call of Duty: World at War
- Cannons
- Cannons Tournament
- Car Town
- Centipede
- Chaos Engine
- Chu Chu Rocket
- Circus City
- Cluedo
- Cluedo SFX
- Concentration
- Codename: KND MINIGAMES
- Colin McRae DiRT Mobile
- Cooking Dash
- Contract Killer
- Contract Killer 2
- Contract Killer Sniper
- Contract Killer: Zombies
- Contract Killer: Zombies 2
- Courage the Cowardly Dog: Haunted House
- Cooking Dash
- Crash 'N' Burn
- Crash 'N' Burn Turbo
- Daily Puzzle
- Death Dome
- Deer Hunter
- Deer Hunter 2
- Deer Hunter 3
- Deer Hunter: African Safari
- Deer Hunter Reloaded
- Deer Hunter 3D
- Deer Hunter Challenge
- Deer Hunter Classic
- Deer Hunter 2018
- Design Home
- Dexter's Laboratory: Security Alert!
- Digimon Racing
- Diner Dash
- Diner Dash 2: Restaurant Rescue
- Diner Dash 3
- Diner Dash 5: Boom!
- Diner Dash: Flo on the Go
- Diner Dash: Flo Through Time
- Diner Dash: Hometown Hero
- Diner Dash Adventures (App Store)
- Dino Hunter: Deadly Shores
- Disney Sorcerer's Arena
- Dominoes
- Dragon Island
- Driver 3 (mobile version)
- Driver: Vegas
- Ed, Edd n Eddy: Giant Jawbreakers
- Enchant U
- Eternity Warriors
- Eternity Warriors 2
- Eternity Warriors 3
- everGirl everGems
- Family Feud
- Family Guy: Time Warped
- Family Guy: Uncensored
- Fatal Force: Earth Assault
- Foster's Home: Balloon Bonanza
- FOX Sports Football '06
- Frontline Commando
- Frontline Commando 2
- Frontline Commando: D-Day
- Frontline Commando: WW2 Shooter
- Game of Life
- Gears & Guts
- Gang Lords
- Get Cookin'
- Glyder
- Glyder 2
- Guitar Hero 5
- Guitar Hero: Warriors of Rock
- Gun Bros (Windows Phone)
- Hero Project
- Hercules
- High Heels MahJong: In Her Shoes
- Hog On the Run
- HOYLE 6-in-1 Solitaire Pro
- Ice Age: Dawn of the Dinosaurs
- Ice Age: The Meltdown
- Indestructible
- Infected
- Insaniquarium Deluxe
- Inuyasha
- Jamaican Bobsled
- Kasparov Chess
- Kim Kardashian: Hollywood
- Kendall and Kylie
- Katy Perry Pop
- Kingdom of Heaven
- Lemmings
- Lemmings Return
- Lemmings Tribes
- Lil Kingdom
- LMA Manager 2008
- Love a Lemming
- Manchester United Football
- Marc Ecko's Getting Up
- Mech Battalion
- Men vs. Machines
- Mission: Impossible – Rogue Nation
- MLB Tap Sports Baseball 2018
- MLB Tap Sports Baseball 2019
- MLB Tap Sports Baseball 2020
- MLB Tap Sports Baseball 2021
- Monopoly
- MONOPOLY HERE & NOW
- Monsters vs. Aliens
- Mr. & Mrs. Smith
- Mutant Roadkill
- My Dragon
- Nicki Minaj: The Empire
- Pirates of Everseas
- Project Gotham Racing Mobile
- QuizUp
- Racing Rivals
- Ren & Stimpy Pinball
- Restaurant DASH with Gordon Ramsay
- Reversi
- Robots
- Samurai vs Zombies Defense
- Samurai vs Zombies Defense 2
- Scooby-Doo!: Castle Capers
- Scooby-Doo! 2: Dark Dungeons
- Shadowalker
- SIMON
- Small Street
- Sniper X
- Space City
- Space Monkey
- Speedball 2 Brutal Deluxe
- Spider-Man: Shattered Dimensions (DS version)
- Spider-Man: Web of Shadows (DS version)
- SpongeBob SquarePants: Prom of Doom
- Star Blitz
- Stardom: The A-List
- Stardom: Hollywood
- Stranded
- Stranded: Mysteries of Time
- Super KO Boxing 2
- Super KO Boxing!
- Tap Sports Baseball 2015
- Tap Sports Baseball 2016
- Tap Sports Baseball 2017
- Tavern Quest
- The Chaos Engine
- The Flintstones Bedrock Bowling
- The Flintstones: Grocery Hunt
- The Lord of the Rings: Middle-Earth Defense
- The Powerpuff Girls: Bad Mojo
- The Price Is Right
- The Swift Life
- Tom and Jerry: Cheese Chase
- Tom and Jerry: Food Fight
- Tony Hawk: Vert
- Terminator Genisys: Revolution
- Transformers (based on the film of the same name)
- Transformers G1: Awakening
- Transformers: Revenge of the Fallen
- VBirds
- Virtua Tennis
- Wacky Races
- Watchmen (based on the film of the same name)
- Who Wants to Be a Millionaire?
- Who Wants to Be a Millionaire?: Celebrity Edition
- World Series of Poker – Hold'em Legend
- World Series of Poker – Pro Challenge
- World Series of Poker Player Advisor
- World Series of Poker: Texas Hold'em
- Yogi Bear Pic-A-Nic
- Zuma
