= Macrospace =

British mobile game company

Macrospace Ltd.
- Trade name: Macrospace
- Industry: Video games
- Defunct: 2005
- Fate: Merged with Sorrent Inc.
- Successor: Glu Mobile
- Headquarters: London, United Kingdom
- Services: EmuX, ProvisionX, ConnectX
- Number of employees: Head Office: 25 (2004)
- Website: Macrospace Games

Macrospace Ltd. was a British developer of mobile content headquartered in London, which mainly focused on Java ME-content. In June 2005, Macrospace merged with Sorrent Inc., to form Glu Mobile. Macrospace provided mobile games and mobile gaming products for network operators, service providers, handset manufacturers, media companies and intellectual property owners.

== Overview ==
The company developed a technology for Java web emulation. It was intended to emulate the full Java capabilities of many of the most popular mobile handsets, including rendering fonts and on-screen instructions.

Macrospace also offered online high score and in-game event billing services. Using the company's services, Cannons Tournament became the first commercially available multiplayer mobile game in Europe, allowing mobile gamers to play peer-to-peer games regardless of network or location.
