= Xavier Lacombe =

French politician

Xavier Lacombe (born 8 June 1965) is a French politician. He was the mayor of Peri, Corse-du-Sud from 2008 to 2025, and a deputy in the National Assembly for Corse-du-Sud's 1st constituency from January to November 2025, sitting in the Horizons group

== Biography ==
Born in Ajaccio, he was elected mayor of Peri, Corse-du-Sud in 2008, defeating incumbent Ange Guerini. In April 2014, following his re-election, he was named vice president of the Communauté d'agglomération du Pays Ajaccien (CAPA).

On 24 January 2025, Lacombe took a seat in the National Assembly for Corse-du-Sud's 1st constituency, after Laurent Marcangeli stepped down to be Minister of Public Action, Civil Service and Simplification in the government of François Bayrou. Lacombe sat in the Horizons group, of which Marcangeli was the president. Lacombe differed from the party line by opposing legislative power for Corsica. Following a change of government, Marcangeli lost his ministry and retook his seat on 5 November.

Lacombe was investigated over forged proxy votes in Peri for the 2021 Corsican territorial election. He pleaded guilty and was offered a three-month suspended prison sentence, but the judge disagreed and sent the case to a higher court. On 21 January 2025, he was charged with "complicity" and "possession of false documents".
