= Arboretum des Milelli =

- Interactive map of Arboretum des Milelli
- Coordinates: 41.939313°N 8.73514°E
- Country: France

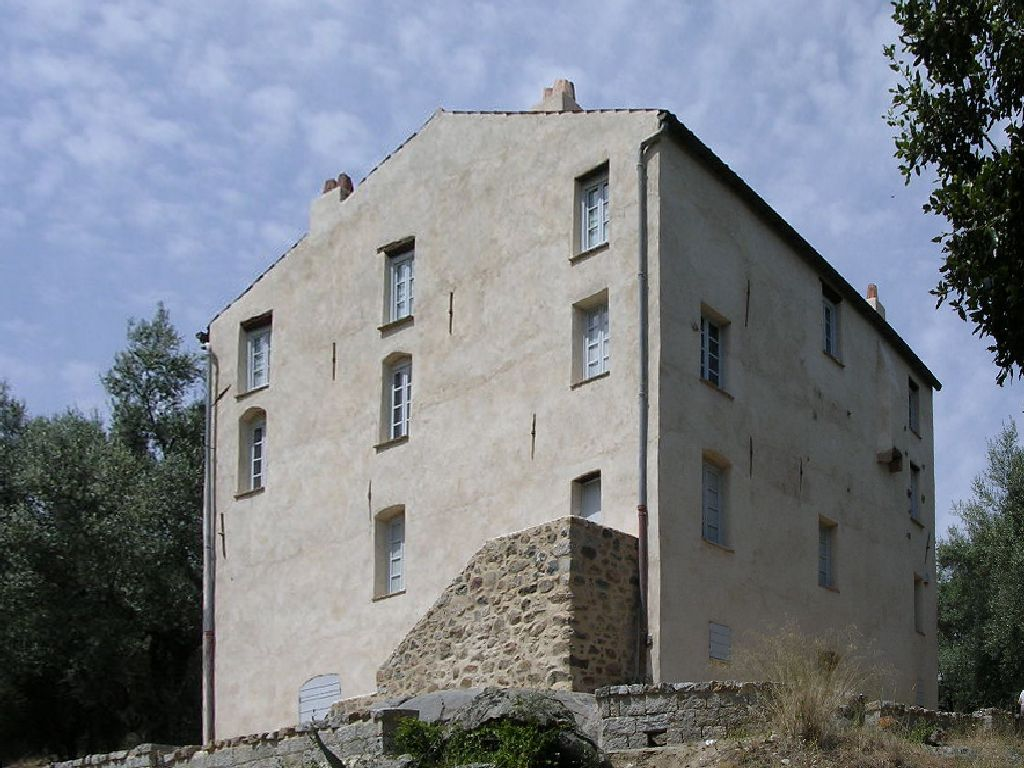
Napoléon Ajaccion Maison des Milelli

The Arboretum des Milelli (Corsican: Arburettu di I Milelli) is an arboretum located on the 12-hectare grounds of Les Milelli, outside Ajaccio, Corse-du-Sud, Corsica, France. Built c.1581, Les Milelli was the long-time summer retreat of the ancestors of Napoleon I of France, and one of his childhood residences; its olive groves provided a large part of the family's income. Upon his return from Egypt in October 1799, it was where Napoleon spent his last night in Corsica after a stay of two days in the company of his staff, Lannes, Berthier and Murat. The house itself is closed to visitors, but its grounds and arboretum are open. The arboretum, established in 1993, contains woody plants representative of Mediterranean flora; an admission fee is charged. The name I milelli means " the little apple trees " in Corsican.

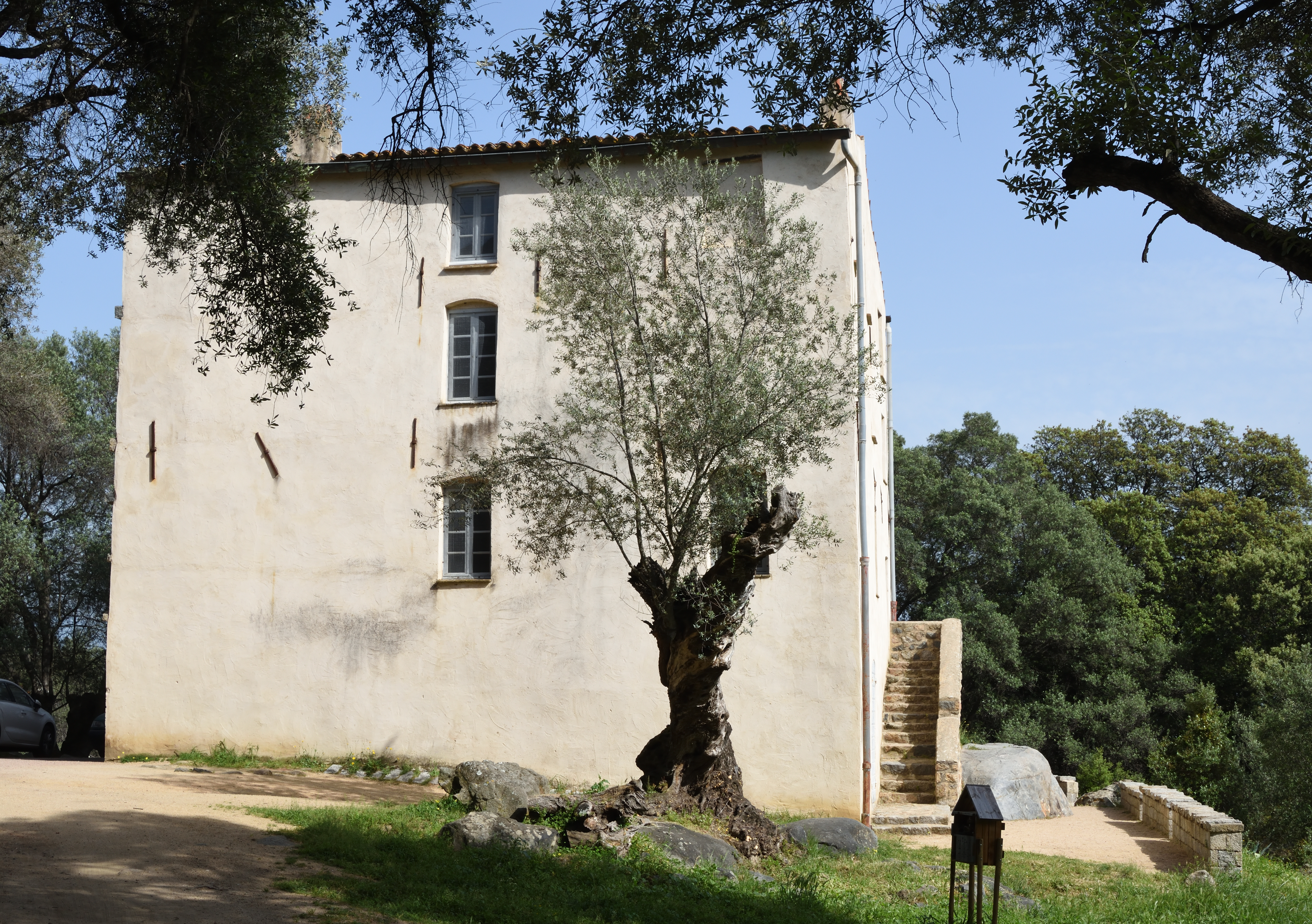

== See also ==
- Casa Buonaparte - the family home in Ajaccio that is now a museum
- List of botanical gardens in France
