= Mayor of Ajaccio =

City government leader in France

- Arms of Ajaccio
- Incumbent; Stéphane Sbraggia since 9 July 2022
- Style: City Mayor
- Term length: Six years
- First holder: Jean-Jérome Levie
- Deputy: Alexandre Farina
- Website: Official website

The Mayor of Ajaccio is the head of Ajaccio City Council. The mayor is an elected politician who, along with the 49 members of Ajaccio City Council, is responsible for the strategic government of the city of Ajaccio, Corsica, France.

The current mayor is Stéphane Sbraggia, elected in 2022.

== Mayors of Ajaccio ==
No.	Mayor	Term in office		Party	Notes
1	Jean-Jérome Levie	19 March 1790	1 May 1791		
2	Vincente Guitera	1 May 1791	1796		
3	Lodovico Ornano	1796	13 August 1798		
4	Thomas Tavera	19 June 1798	6 July 1798		
5	Antoine Tagliafico	6 July 1798	13 August 1798		
6	François-Marie Levie	13 August 1798	6 October 1799		
7	J.B. Pozzo di Borgo	6 October 1799	4 April 1800		
8	Jean-Jérome Levie	4 April 1800	22 July 1801		
9	Pierre Stephanopoli	22 July 1801	2 March 1805		
10	François Levie	2 March 1805	25 September 1816		
11	Georges Stephanopoli	25 September 1816	16 April 1817		
12	Adorno de Baciocchi	16 April 1817	15 September 1819		
13	J.B. Colonna de Bozzi	15 September 1819	25 December 1822		
14	J.B. Spoturno	25 December 1822	9 March 1826		
15	Constantin Stephanopoli	9 March 1826	7 February 1832		
16	Ascagne Cunéo d'Ornano	7 February 1832	14 November 1837		
17	Paul François Peraldi	14 November 1837	10 May 1848		
18	Bernardin Poli	10 May 1848	17 May 1848		
19	Laurent Zevaco	17 May 1848	2 July 1855	Républicain	
20	Antoine de Cosmi	2 July 1855	12 September 1860		
21	François-Xavier Braccini	12 September 1860	24 July 1867		
22	Louis Nyer	24 July 1867	17 February 1870	Bonapartism	
23	Joseph Fil	17 February 1870	10 September 1870	Bonapartism	
24	Nicolas Péraldi	10 September 1870	25 May 1871	Républicain	
25	Joseph Fil	25 May 1871	11 November 1871	Bonapartism	
26	Nicolas Péraldi	11 November 1871	29 October 1873	Républicain	
27	François-Xavier Forcioli Conti	29 October 1873	28 March 1876	Bonapartism	
28	Nicolas Péraldi	28 March 1876	5 September 1877	Républicain	
29	Joseph Fil	5 September 1877	23 December 1877	Bonapartism	
30	Nicolas Péraldi	23 December 1877	21 May 1884	Républicain	
31	Joseph Pugliesi	21 May 1884	11 May 1893	Bonapartism	
32	Pierre Petreto	11 May 1893	10 May 1896	Bonapartism	
33	Joseph Pugliesi	10 May 1896	May 1900	Bonapartism	
34	Pierre Bodoy	May 1900	May 1904	Bonapartism	
35	Dominique Pugliesi-Conti	May 1904	May 1919	CCB	
36	Jérôme Peri	May 1919	May 1925	Radical	
37	Dominique Paoli	May 1925	May 1931	CCB	
38	François Coty	May 1931	August 1934	CCB	
39	Hyacinthe Campiglia	August 1934	11 May 1935	CCB	
40	Dominique Paoli	11 May 1935	10 September 1943	CCB	
41	Eugène Macchini	10 September 1943	17 May 1945	CCB	
42	Arthur Giovoni	17 May 1945	26 October 1947	PCF	
43	Nicéphore Stephanopoli de Commene	26 October 1947	7 January 1949	CCB	
44	Antoine Sérafini	7 January 1949	May 1953	CCB	
45	François Maglioli	May 1953	March 1959	CCB	
46	Antoine Sérafini	March 1959	17 April 1964	CCB	
47	Pascal Rossini	17 April 1964	September 1975	CCB	
48	Charles Ornano	16 November 1975	February 1994	CCB	Degree in Law
49	Marc Marcangeli	March 1994	May 2001	CCB	doctor Conseiller général d'Ajaccio-1; Deputy Mayor of Ajaccio
50	Simon Renucci	May 2001	4 April 2014	CSD	doctor/pediatrician
51	Laurent Marcangeli	4 April 2014	27 October 2014 (Resignation)	UMP, CCB	Conseiller général d'Ajaccio-1; Deputy Mayor of Ajaccio
51	Laurent Marcangeli	5 April 2014	9 July 2022	UMP then LR then DVD, CCB	Conseiller général d'Ajaccio-1; Deputy Mayor of Ajaccio
52	Stéphane Sbraggia	9 July 2022	incumbent		

== See also ==
- Ajaccio
- Municipal council
- Municipal elections in France
- Mayor
