= 2021 Corsican territorial election =

- 20 & 27 June 2021

All 63 seats in the Assembly 32 seats needed for a majority
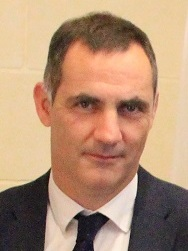

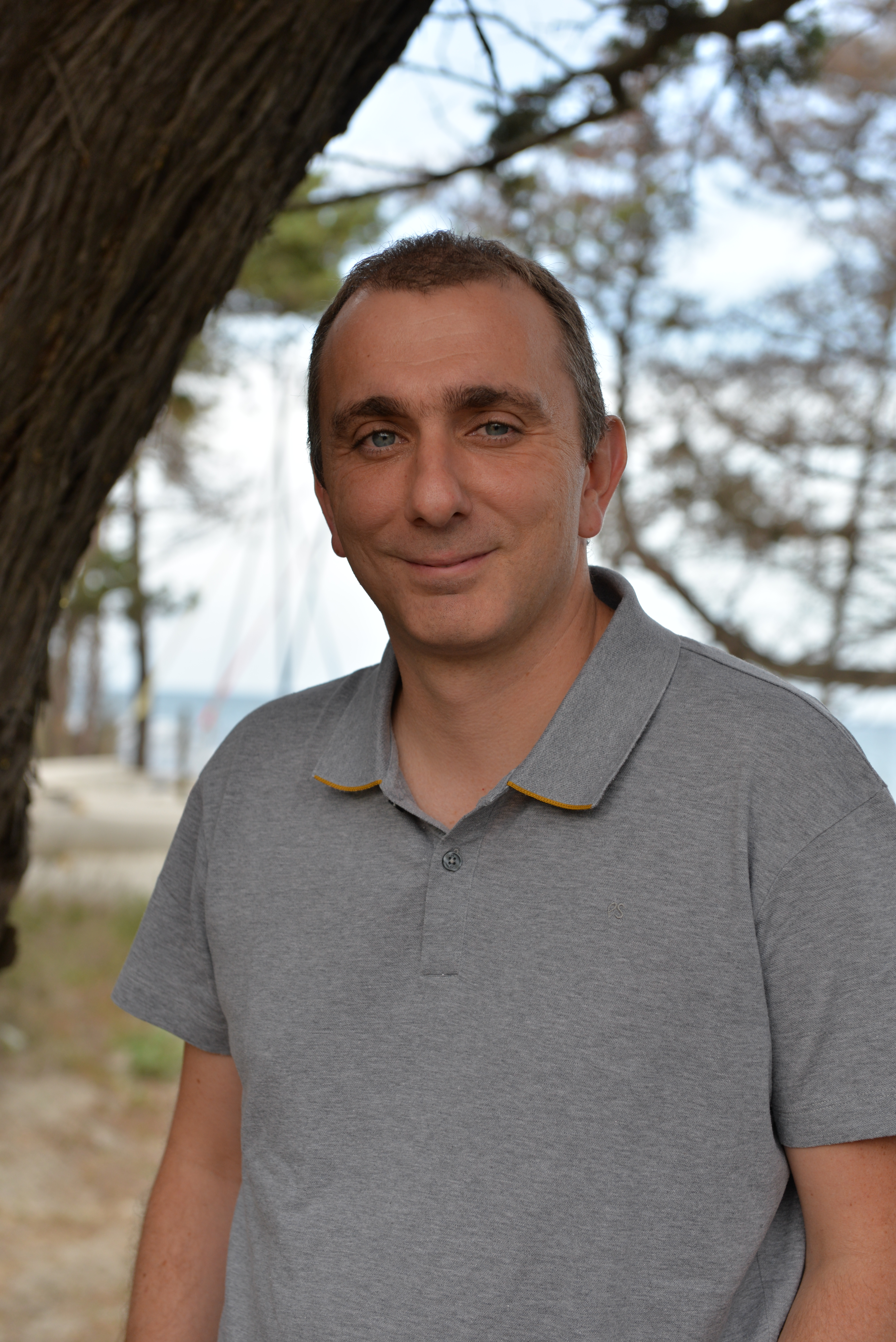
	First party	Second party
		DVD
Leader	Gilles Simeoni	Laurent Marcangeli
Party	Femu a Corsica	DVD
Seats before	28	16
Seats won	32	17
Seat change	▲4	▲1
First round	39,247; 29.19% ▼16.17	33,432; 24.86% ▼2.89
Second round	55,548; 40.64% ▼15.82	43,769; 32.02% ▲1.14
	Third party	Fourth party
		RIN
Leader	Jean-Christophe Angelini	Paul-Félix Benedetti
Party	PNC–CL	Rinnovu
Seats before	13	0
Seats won	8	6
Seat change	▼4	▲6
First round	27,052; 20.12% ▲20.12	11,282; 8.39% ▲1.70
Second round	20,064; 15.07% ▲15.07	16,762; 12.26% ▲12.26
President of the Regional Council before election
Gilles Simeoni
Femu a Corsica
Elected President of the Regional Council
Gilles Simeoni
Femu a Corsica

The 2021 territorial elections in Corsica took place on 20 and 27 June 2021 alongside other regional elections across France.

== Results ==
Party	First round		Second round		Seats	+/–
Party	Votes	%	Votes	%	Seats	+/–
Femu a Corsica	39,247	29.19	55,548	40.64	32	+4
CCB–LR–UDI	33,432	24.86	43,769	32.02	17	+1
Party of the Corsican Nation	17,772	13.22	20,604	15.07	7	New
Corsica Libera	9,280	6.90	20,604	15.07	1	–12
Rinnovu	11,282	8.39	16,762	12.26	6	+6
TdP–LREM–MR	7,957	5.92			0	–6
National Rally	5,378	4.00			0	0
EÉLV–G.s–GÉ–ND	5,039	3.75			0	New
French Communist Party	4,279	3.18			0	0
Forza Nova	791	0.59			0	New
Total	134,457	100.00	136,683	100.00	63	0
Valid votes	134,457	98.22	136,683	96.79		
Invalid/blank votes	2,430	1.78	4,540	3.21		
Total votes	136,887	100.00	141,223	100.00		
Registered voters/turnout	239,808	57.08	239,718	58.91		
Source: Ministry of the Interior

== Aftermath ==
Pè a Corsica was dissolved after the election.
