= Jean-Jacques Ferrara =

French politician (born 1967)

Member of the National Assembly for Corse-du-Sud's 1st constituency
- In office 21 June 2017 – 21 June 2022
- Preceded by: Laurent Marcangeli
- Succeeded by: Laurent Marcangeli

Personal details
- Born: 16 June 1967 (age 58) Marseille, France
- Party: Union for a Popular Movement (until 2015); The Republicans (2015–present)

Jean-Jacques Ferrara (French pronunciation: [ʒɑ̃ʒak fɛʁaʁa]; born 16 June 1967) is a French surgeon and retired politician. A member of The Republicans (LR), he represented the 1st constituency of Corse-du-Sud in the National Assembly from 2017 to 2022. He did not run for reelection in the 2022 legislative election.

He also served as a municipal councillor of Ajaccio (2012–2020) and president of the Communauté d'agglomération du Pays Ajaccien (2015–2017).

== See also ==
- 2017 French legislative election
