= Arrondissements of the Corse-du-Sud department =

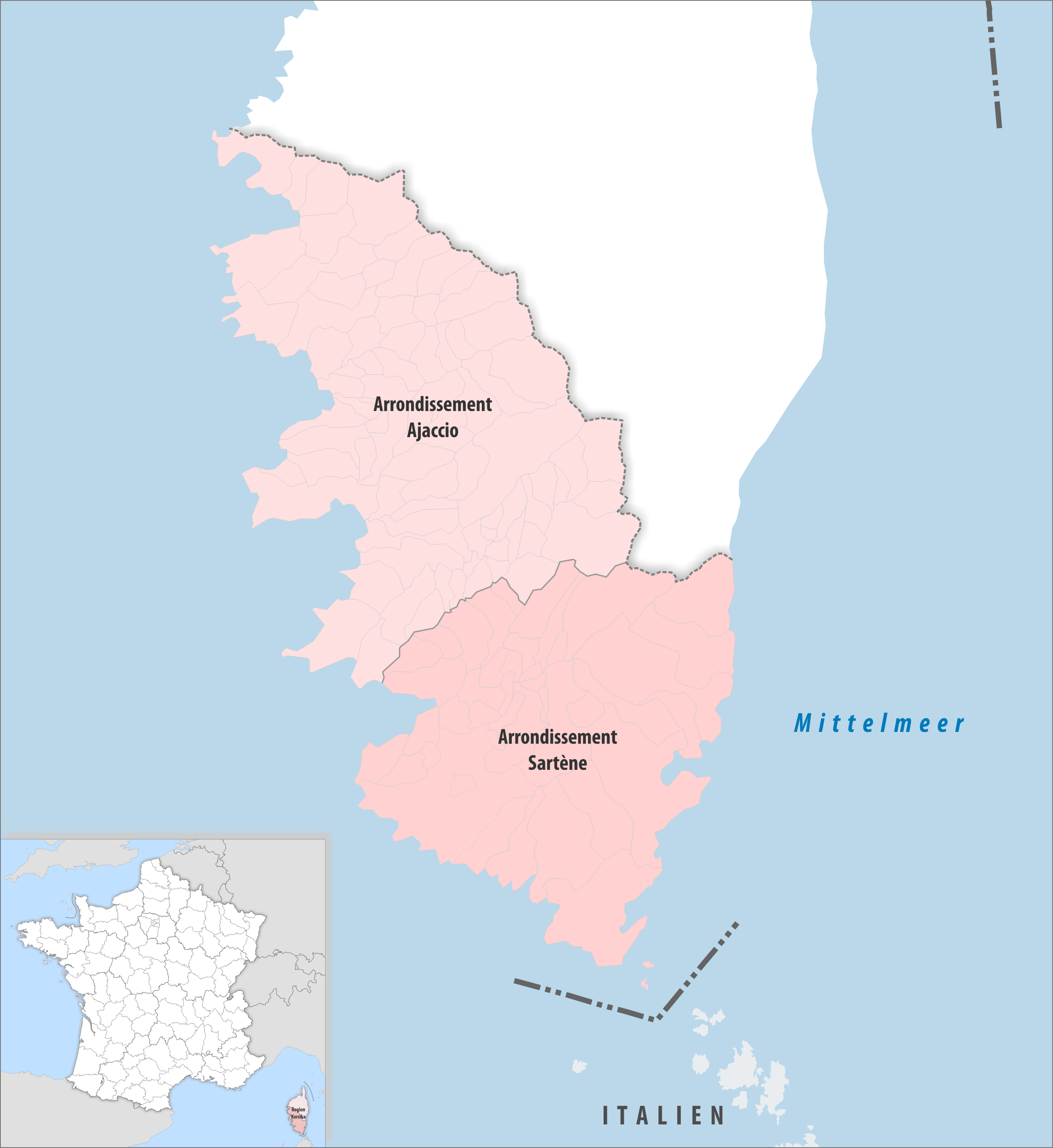
Map of arrondissements of the Corse-du-Sud department.

The 2 arrondissements of the Corse-du-Sud department are:

1. Arrondissement of Ajaccio, (prefecture of the Corse-du-Sud department: Ajaccio) with 81 communes. The population of the arrondissement was 121,218 in 2021.
2. Arrondissement of Sartène, (subprefecture: Sartène) with 43 communes. The population of the arrondissement was 41,724 in 2021.

== History ==
In 1800 the arrondissements of Ajaccio and Sartène were established as part of the department Liamone. Between 1811 and 1976 these arrondissements were part of the department Corse, since 1976 they have been arrondissements of the department Corse-du-Sud. In March 2017 the commune Olivese was assigned from the arrondissement of Sartène to the arrondissement of Ajaccio.
