= Leon Cotnareanu =

Romanian-French businessman (c.1892–1970)

Leon Cotnareanu (c. 1892 – January 2, 1970) was a Romanian-French businessman. He co-owned Le Figaro and was chairman of Coty.

== Biography ==
Cotnareanu was born c. 1892, in Romania, his father being a banker and hotelier. He had five siblings, including fellow businessman Philip Cortney. His surname originated from the town of Cotnari. He grew up in Bucharest. He studied at the University of Bucharest, Leipzig University, and the University of London. During World War I, he served as a cavalryman.

In the early 1920s, Cotnareanu moved to Paris. where he worked as a Romanian consul. There, he founded several companies with his brother, Ionel, including Petrometal and Industrial Watchmaking and Electronic Devices. He also worked as a Romanian diplomat in Nice and Monaco, until being dismissed from the position on August 19, 1940.

In 1929, Cotnareanu married Yvonne Le Baron, who was previously married to perfumer François Coty. Cotnareanu and Yvonne had met at a casino in Nice in the early 1920s, where Yvonne went to elude Coty, and Cotnareanu to discuss business; Yvonne was dissatisfied with her marriagr to Coty, so fell in love with Cornareanu.

Due to his connection to Coty, Cotnareanu became an associate of his companies. He co-owned Le Figaro and served as vice-chairman of its board of directors. During World War II, he helped publish the paper while in the United States, though its publication ceased on November 10, 1942, being re-established following the war. Businessman Jean Prouvost had funded the newspaper during the war, and to repay his funding, editor Pierre Brisson made a deal in which Cotnareanu would continue funding the paper's operation thereafter. From 1939 to 1963, he also served as director of Coty.

Coty was Jewish, which led to Coty pushing antisemitism in Le Figaro. He held the Legion of Honour. For leisure, he golfed and yatched, as well as collected books and art. He died on January 2, 1970, aged 78, in Geneva, from illness.
