= Lilly Daché =

French-born American fashion designer (1892 – 1989)

- Scrutinising her new hat design in 1956
- Born: c. 1892; Bègles, France
- Died: 31 December 1989 (aged 97); Louveciennes, France
- Known for: Milliner, fashion designer
- Spouses: Russell Earl Carn (div. 1930) Jean Despres (m. 1931; died 1988)
- Children: 1

Lilly Daché (c. 1892 – 31 December 1989) was a French-born American milliner and fashion merchandiser. She started her career in a small bonnet shop, advanced to being a sales lady at Macy's department store, and from there started her own hat business. She was at the peak of her business career in the 1930s and 1940s. Her contributions to millinery were well-known custom-designed fashion hats for wealthy women, celebrities, socialites, and movie stars. Her hats cost about ten times the average cost of a lady's hat. Her main hat business was in New York City with branches in Paris. Later in her career she expanded her fashion line to include dresses, perfume, and jewelry.

== Biography ==
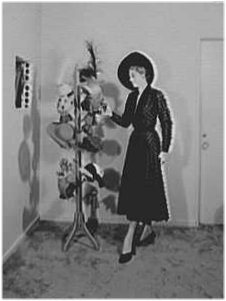
Residence on 56th Street, New York

Daché was born in France and immigrated to the United States in 1924, arriving on 13 September. She moved to New York City and got a job at the Bonnet Shop. Daché bought out her friend's share within a year and owned the entire business.

Daché's contributions to millinery were wrapped around turbans, custom-fitted hats, brimmed half hats, hat caps with visors, cone-tipped berets, loose-fitting colored hairnets, and decorative flower-shaped hats. Daché said that glamour made a man ask for the wearer's telephone number and it also made a woman ask for the name of the wearer's tailor. Her business flourished in spite of the Great Depression and World War II. Her hats cost upwards of $20 to $80 at a time when a decent hat could be bought for just a tenth of that.

Daché worked with Hollywood costume designer Travis Banton to provide hats.

Daché became a celebrity when she was a guest on a 1955 episode of the television game show What's My Line?. Panelist Arlene Francis guessed her mystery identity. She is referenced in the song "Tangerine" performed by the Jimmy Dorsey orchestra as the female singer sings in the second chorus that "Tangerine, she is all they say, with mascaraed eye and chapeaux by Daché."

Daché began designing swagger hats in 1948. She also designed clothing, cosmetics, jewelry and other accessories. She had business branches for these products in Paris. Some of her custom hats are displayed at New York's Metropolitan Museum.

Daché retired in 1968 after selling her last hats to actress Loretta Young. She died on 31 December 1989, in Louveciennes, France.

== Personal life ==
In 1931, Daché married French-born Jean Despres who was an executive at the large cosmetics and fragrance company, Coty. She had a daughter, Suzanne. In her final years, she spent time in Delray Beach, Florida. She also spent time in New York City and Meudon, France.

== Works ==
- Talking Through My Hats (1946)
- Glamour Book (1956)

== Awards ==
- Neiman Marcus Fashion Award (1940)
- Coty American Fashion Critics Award (1943)

== Sources ==
- Barrett, Judy (1994). Litoff, Judy Barret; McDonnel, Judith (eds.). European Immigrant Women in the United States. Garland Publishing. ISBN 978-0-8240-5306-2.
- Carey, Jenna Weissman (2014). American Entrepreneurs, and Business Visionaries. Facts on File, Incorporated. ISBN 978-0-8160-6883-8.
- Cooper, Jilly (1980). Beyond Bartlett: quotations by and about women. New York: Stein and Day. ISBN 9780812861921. OCLC 1028723134.
- Grantland, Brenda Weissman (2016). Hatatorium:A Guide for Hat Collectors. Macmillan. ISBN 978-0-9847859-0-2.
- Joselit, Jenna Weissman (2002). A Perfect Fit. Macmillan. ISBN 978-0-8050-5487-3.
- Kellogg, Ann T. (2002). In an Influential Fashion. Greenwood Press. ISBN 978-0-313-31220-5.
- Moore, Booth (2018). American Runway. ABRAMS. ISBN 978-1-68335-098-9.
- Sherrow, Victoria (2001). For Appearance' Sake / Encyclopedia of Good Looks. Oryx Press. ISBN 978-1-57356-204-1.
- Ware, Susan (2004). Notable American Women. Belknap Press. ISBN 978-0-674-01488-6.
