= Philip Cortney =

Romanian-French-American businessman (1895–1971)

- Born: Philippe Cotnareanu; January 16, 1895; Romania
- Died: June 11, 1971 (aged 76); Geneva, Switzerland
- Education: Nancy-Université; Columbia University
- Occupations: Businessman, economist
- Relatives: Leon Cotnareanu (brother)

Philip Cortney (born Philippe Cotnareanu; January 16, 1895 – June 11, 1971) was a Romanian-French-American businessman and economist. He was director of the American branch of Coty. As an economist, he was a supporter of the gold standard.

== Early life ==
Cortney was born on January 16, 1895, in Romania, the son of a banker and hotelier. He was born Philippe Cotnareanu, with his surname deriving from the town of Cotnari. He was the youngest of five siblings, of which included businessman Leon Cotnareanu. He studied engineering at Nancy-Université, graduating in 1916. During World War I, he served in the French Army.

== Career ==
Beginning in 1919, Cortney worked as an engineer for a laboratory in Paris. He later founded an exports company, and in 1931, began working for Banque Transatlantique, later becoming an executive. In 1940, he fled to the United States to escape Nazi rule of Europe. At the time, he was director of the American branch of the perfume company Coty. He spent his time in the United States studying multiple subjects at Columbia University, namely economics, law, and political science. He Anglicised his surname, from Cotnareanu to Cortney, during this time. He received United States citizenship in 1946.

For a time, Cortney worked as a lawyer for his brother Leon and his companies. He also engaged in organizational work, such as serving as director of the National Association of Manufacturers. He was also a member of the New York Academy of Sciences and a recipient of the Legion of Honour. In 1947, he established the Maison de France, an organization promoting France–United States economic diplomacy.

An economist, Cortney was a member of the Mont Pelerin Society and Royal Economic Society. Beginning in 1945, he associated with Ludwig von Mises after Mises complimented an economics article he wrote. From 1957 to 1959, he served as chairman of the United States Council for International Business. He supported hard currency and the gold standard. In a 1965 speech defending the gold standard, Fritz Machlup responded by comparing him to a trade unionist, which caused Mises to disassociate from Machlup.

An ideologue of the Austrian school of economics, Cortney argued for free trade and reducing governmental oversight. He blamed the Wall Street crash of 1929 on "government interventionists and money managers". By the same token, he believed in United States non-interventionism, as interventionalism would destabilize foreign economies and currencies. He instead believed in international trade, so supported the International Trade Organization and the freedom to convert money between currencies.

== Personal life and death ==
Cortney was Jewish. He was married to Marcelle Cortney, an opera singer. He retired c. 1961 and moved to Geneva, where he died on June 11, 1971, aged 76, from a myocardial infarction.
