= Jean Despres =

- Born: 1903; France
- Died: August 19, 1978 (aged 74–75)
- Citizenship: United States
- Occupation: Perfume industry executive
- Known for: Executive Vice President of Coty; founder of the Fragrance Foundation; founder of the Coty American Fashion Critics' Awards
- Spouse: Lilly Daché

Jean Despres (1903 – August 19, 1978) was a French-born American perfume executive who spent nearly fifty years at Coty.inc, rising from a shipping clerk to Executive Vice President. He helped shape modern fragrance marketing, pioneered in-store cosmetics merchandising, and co-founded key industry institutions such as the Fragrance Foundation and the Coty American Fashion Critics' Awards.

== Life and career ==
The French-born Jean Despres came to New York City in 1921, working for Coty. Starting as a shipping clerk, he went on to become a travelling salesman, covering thousands of miles on the Santa Fe Railroad across America to sell Coty perfumes and gift sets. He soon became a sales manager, and in 1942 was appointed Executive Vice President of Coty. He had held this position for more than 25 years when Pfizer purchased Coty in 1968.

Coty was a French perfume company created by wealthy François Coty, proprietor of Le Figaro, the French daily newspaper headquartered on the Champs-Élysées in Paris, and owner of numerous chateaux and villas in France and Corsica. Coty died in 1934. Jean Despres led Coty in New York, alongside Philippe Cortney, the brother-in-law of Mrs Coty-Cotnareanu. He founded the Fragrance Foundation in New York for the perfume industry, serving as its president. When he retired, he appointed Anette Greene. He was a founder of the Toilet Goods Association Inc., Washington, D.C., and was its president in the 1960s, attending annual meetings until 1987, a year before his death.

With the expansion of department stores in the 1930s and 1940s, he created "in-store" displays and "in-store" merchandising staff, which evolved into the cosmetics counters of today.

He was a founding member of the Coty American Fashion Critics' Awards, along with Grover Whalen, created to encourage and honor American talent and American fashion designers. The awards presentation ceremony initially took place at the Metropolitan Club (where he was a member for 50 years), subsequently moved to the Metropolitan Museum of Art and eventually held at Alice Tully Hall, Lincoln Center. He joined the New York Athletic Club when it opened in 1924, was a director of the French Hospital in New York City, of Coty International, the French-American Chamber of Commerce, Compagnie de St. Gobain and Lilly Dache, Inc., a Chevalier of the Confrerie des Chevaliers de Tastevin, and resident of New York City, Pound Ridge, NY, Delray Beach, Florida and Meudon, France. In the 1940s he became an American Citizen.

== Family ==
Despres married milliner and fashion designer Lilly Daché in Palm Beach, Florida in 1931. His grandson, John Gordon Gauld, is a New York and Massachusetts artist. Daughter, Suzanne Dache, continues the Dache businesses.
