= François Coty =

French perfumer and businessman (1874–1934)

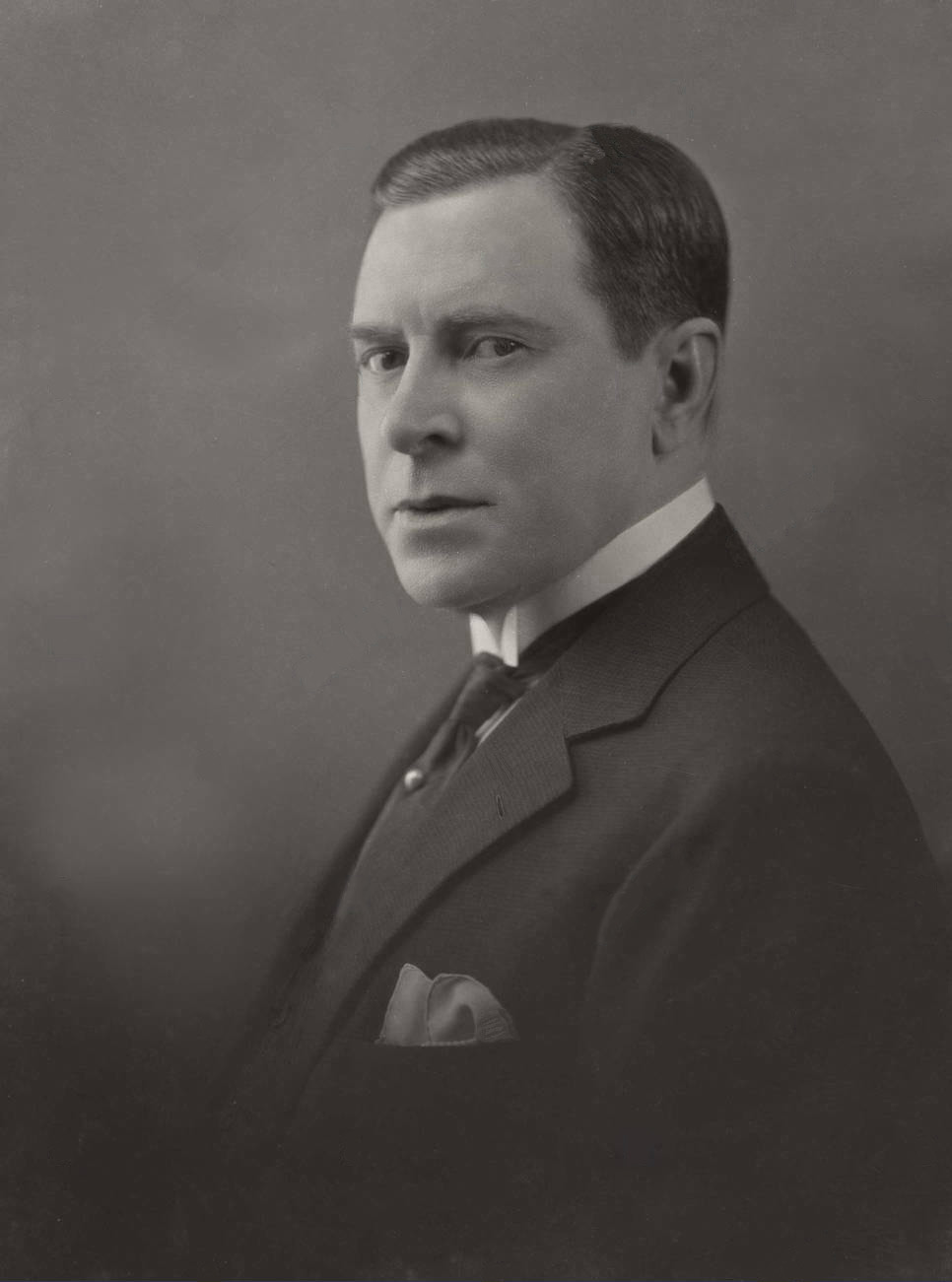

Senator of Corsica
- In office 1923–1924

Mayor of Ajaccio
- In office May 1931 – August 1934
- Preceded by: Dominique Paoli
- Succeeded by: Hyacinthe Campiglia

Personal details
- Born: Joseph Marie François Spoturno; 3 May 1874 Ajaccio, Corsica, France
- Died: 25 July 1934 (aged 60) Louveciennes, Yvelines, France
- Party: Bonapartist Central Committee; French Solidarity (1933–1934)
- Occupation: Perfumer; Entrepreneur; Newspaper publisher
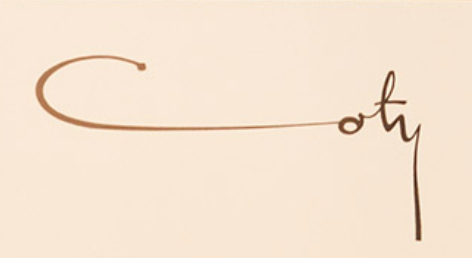
- Signature

François Coty (French pronunciation: [fʁɑ̃swa kɔti]; born Joseph Marie François Spoturno [ʒozɛf maʁi fʁɑ̃swa spɔtuʁno]; 3 May 1874 – 25 July 1934) was a French perfumer, businessman, newspaper publisher, politician and patron of the arts. He was the founder of the Coty perfume company, today a multinational. He is considered the founding father of the modern perfume industry.

In 1904, his first success, fragrance La Rose Jacqueminot launched his career. He soon started exporting perfumes from France, and by 1910 he had subsidiaries in Moscow, London and New York. During the 1917 Russian Revolution, his assets in Moscow, which consisted of stocks and funds were confiscated by the Soviet government, making him a lifelong enemy of Communism.

By the end of World War I, his financial success made him one of the richest men in France, allowing him to act as patron of the arts, collect works of art, historic homes and seek to play a political role. In 1922, he gained control of daily newspaper Le Figaro. To check the growth of socialism and Communism in France, he founded two other daily papers in 1928.

In 1923 he was elected senator of Corsica, and was mayor of Ajaccio from 1931 to 1934.

Fearing the spread of communism, he subsidized various right-wing movements. In 1933, faced with a political class that he considered incapable, he published "A Reform of the State" (La Réforme de l’État) and founded his own movement Solidarité française, which became more radical after his death.

At the time of his death, at age 60, his fortune was greatly diminished as a result of his divorce, the high cost of running his press empire and the repercussions of the economic crisis of 1929.

== Early life and family ==
Joseph Marie François Spoturno was born on 3 May 1874 in Ajaccio, Corsica. He claimed to be a descendant of Isabelle Bonaparte, an aunt of Napoleon Bonaparte. His parents were Jean-Baptiste Spoturno and Marie-Adolphine-Françoise Coti, both descendants of Genoese settlers who founded Ajaccio in the 15th century. His parents died when he was a child and the young François was raised by his great-grandmother, Marie Josephe Spoturno, and after her death, by his grandmother, Anna Maria Belone Spoturno, who lived in Marseille.

After spending some years in military service, François met a fellow Corsican named Emmanuel Arène. A politician, writer, and future senator, Arène became François's mentor, offering him a job in Paris as his secretary. In Paris, François married Yvonne Alexandrine Le Baron and took the more French-looking name Coty, a variation on his mother's maiden name. He also met Raymond Goery, a pharmacist who made and sold perfume at his Paris shop. Coty began to learn about perfumery from Goery and created his first fragrance, Cologne Coty.

== Perfumer ==
Through Arène, Coty met Léon Chiris, a senator and member of the Chiris family, longtime manufacturers and distributors of perfume. At the Chiris factories in Grasse, in 1903, Coty studied perfumery and began work on a fragrance, La Rose Jacqueminot. On his return to Paris in 1900, he visited the Exposition Universelle (1900), (event of the Belle Époque), got married and in 1904, Coty set off to sell his scents to department stores, boutiques, and barbershops, but initially met with little success. His luck changed when he dropped a bottle of La Rose Jacqueminot on a countertop at the Grands Magasins du Louvre, the Parisian department store. Attracted by the scent, customers swarmed the area, demanding to buy the perfume. Coty's entire stock was gone in a few minutes and the store offered him a place on the selling floor for his products. The success of La Rose made Coty a millionaire and established him as a major player in the perfume world.

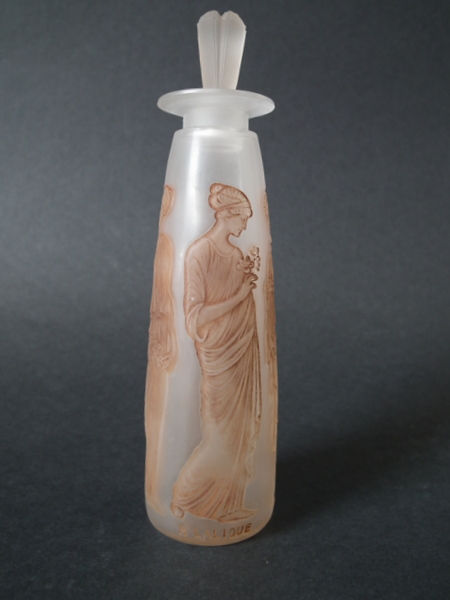
Perfume bottle, Lalique for Ambre Antique.

Coty recognized that an attractive bottle was essential to a perfume's success. Though La Rose came in a Baccarat bottle, Coty's most famous collaboration was with the great ceramist and jeweler René Lalique. Lalique designed the bottles for Coty's early scents, such as Ambre Antique and L'Origan, which became bestsellers. He also designed the labels for Coty perfume, which were printed on a gold background with raised lettering. Lalique's designs for Coty were in the Art Nouveau style that was prevalent in the period, and incorporated classic Art Nouveau themes such as nature, flowers, and female figures.

Besides pioneering the concept of bottle design, Coty was responsible for making perfume available to a mass market. Before Coty, perfume was considered a luxury item, affordable only to the very rich. Coty was the first to offer perfumes at many price points. By combining natural essences and synthetic products from suppliers such as Firmenich, he was able to reduce the costs of production. He is considered as the creator of modern perfumery. His perfumes, in their Lalique and Baccarat bottles, were aimed at the luxury market, but he also sold perfume in smaller, plainer bottles affordable to middle and working-class women. Coty perfume bottles, though mass-produced, were carefully designed to convey an image of luxury and prestige. Coty also invented the idea of a fragrance set, a gift box containing identically scented items, such as a perfume and matching powder, soap, cream, and cosmetics.

Coty summed up his approach to business when he said:

Give a woman the best product to be made, market it in the perfect flask, beautiful in its simplicity yet impeccable in its taste, ask a reasonable price for it, and you will witness the birth of a business the size of which the world has never seen.

In 1908, Coty relocated his manufacturing headquarters to Suresnes, just outside Paris. He acquired property in the area and began to build what would become "La cité des Parfums", a large complex of laboratories and factories that manufactured his products. "La cité" had 9,000 employees and was able to manufacture up to 100,000 bottles a day. This allowed Coty to meet the burgeoning demand for his products in France and abroad. On the eve of the First World War, Coty perfumes were No. 1 in the world, with branches in Moscow, New York, London and Buenos Aires, and François Coty was already very rich. In 1913, his exclusive agent in the United States since 1910, Benjamin Levy, assisted him in the creation of Coty. in Delaware. In 1917, during the turmoil of the Russian Revolution, his stores, factories, stocks, accounts and deposits at the Crédit Lyonnais in Moscow (nearly 4 million francs at the time) were confiscated by the Bolsheviks.

After World War I, demand for French perfume grew at a rapid pace. Many American soldiers had been stationed in France during the war and they brought back Coty perfumes to their wives and relatives. Coty realized the importance of the lucrative American market and began to distribute his products in the United States.

In 1921, with the help of executive Jean Despres, Coty created an American subsidiary in New York to handle the assembly and distribution of its products in the American market. (Coty's headquarters at No. 714 Fifth Avenue is now a registered landmark after restoration of Lalique's windows.) The American offices assembled their own Coty products from raw materials sent by the Parisian factories, thus avoiding the high tariffs on luxury products in the United States. This allowed Coty to offer more competitive prices on its products. Later, additional subsidiaries were established in the United Kingdom and Romania.

Coty soon expanded his product line to include cosmetics and skin care, and expanded his distribution network to Europe, Asia, and Latin America. By 1925, 36 million women worldwide used Coty face powders. His most popular product was his Air Spun face powder, launched in 1934. Coty collaborated with famous costume designer Léon Bakst to create the look of the Air Spun powder box. It became so popular that soon afterwards Coty launched the Air Spun powder scented with his most popular perfumes, such as L'origan and Emeraude (fragrance).

== Patronage ==
Coty was one of the wealthiest men in France; in 1929, his fortune was estimated at US$34 million. His wealth allowed him to play a role during the années folles, financially funding artistic, early aeronautic endeavours and scientific undertakings. His sponsorship included supporting his native Corsica, participating in the development of the electrical infrastructure for the city of Ajaccio, building affordable housing, and establishing a World War I monument. He provided financial support to the French Olympic committee for the 1928 Summer Olympics and toward the attempts of Costes and Bellonte to break aeronautic world records by crossing the Atlantic from Paris To New York in 1930, and the tragic attempt by pilots Joseph Le Brix and René Mesmin, to break the world record for distance flying. Coty's contributions additionally supported the establishment of a new research laboratory for physicist Édouard Branly (radio communications forerunner) within the Catholic institute of Paris and provided support for numerous artists as well as the French Academy in Rome.

== Newspaper publisher and politics ==
In 1923, after a close race, Coty was elected senator of Corsica, but his victory proved short-lived. The French Senate annulled his election in 1924 after accusations of bribery.

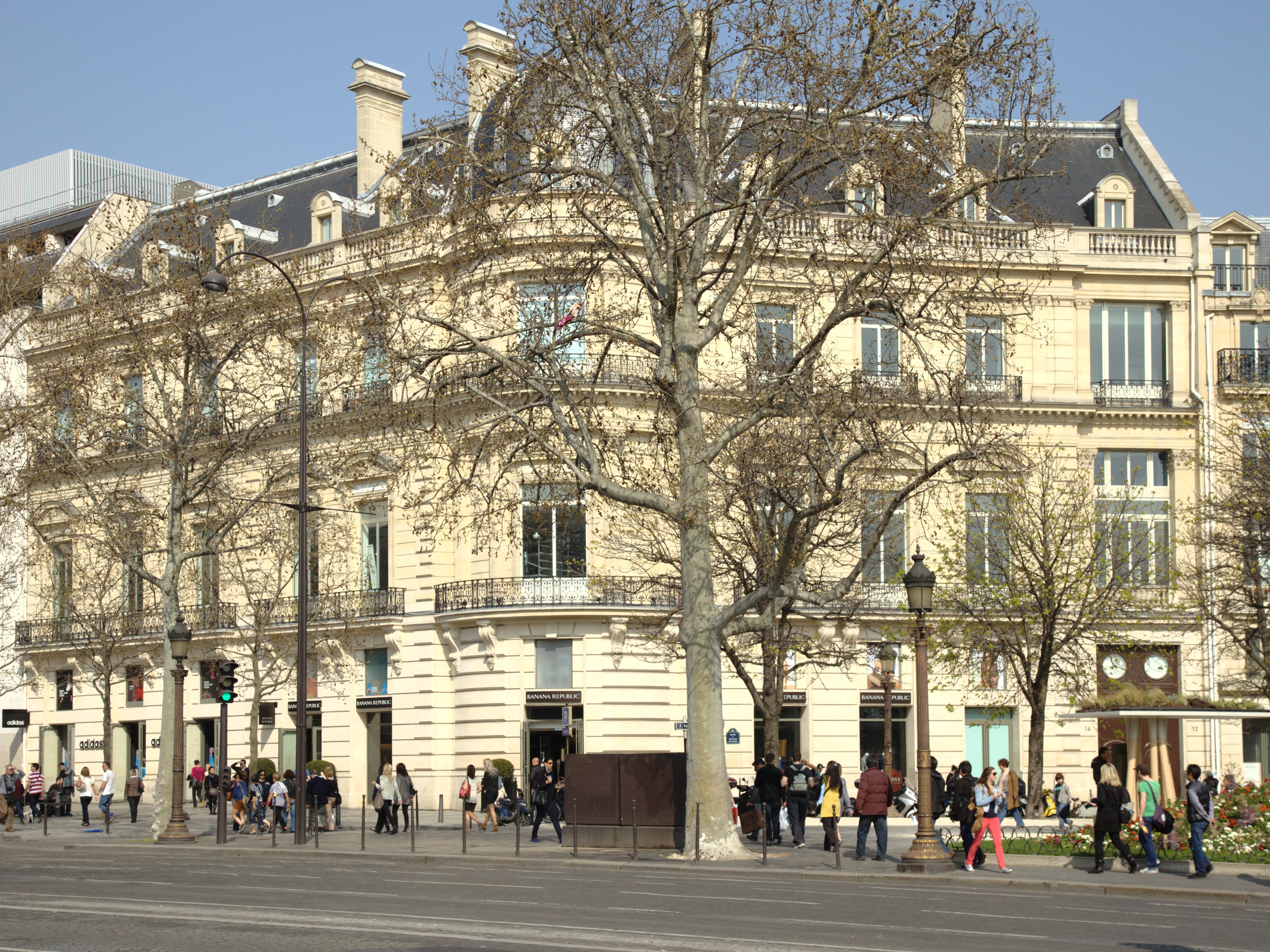
Figaro headquarters under Coty.

In 1922, Coty bought Le Figaro, a prestigious conservative newspaper with an upper-class readership. Coty changed the newspaper's name to Figaro and moved its headquarters to the Rond-Point des Champs-Elysées. Under Coty's ownership, the journal, once moderately conservative, adopted an extreme right-wing stance on politics and the economy. Figaro printed many fierce anti-Communist articles, and was notorious for its strong opposition to the government. He also subsidized "half a dozen extremist papers, including the Action française (to which he gave over five million francs), Cassagnac's Bonapartist Authorité and Le Flambeau, the organ of the Croix de Feu."

In 1926, Coty worked with Prime Minister Raymond Poincaré to create a fund to stabilize the French currency. He offered to lend 100 million francs to the French government, but was left out of the group appointed to oversee the fund, possibly because of his controversial political views. He then took his money to New York and donated a sizable sum to the French Hospital in New York.

Disappointed once again, in 1926, Coty launched L'Ami du peuple, a newspaper aimed at the working class. Priced much lower than other competing newspapers, it soon gained a huge readership. He wrote a long series of incendiary articles that did not go unnoticed; on 1 July 1933, he was found guilty in court for libel against Jewish war veterans' groups in France and in September 1933, he sent a telegram to the Geneva Jewish Community, in which he recanted his anti-Jewish charges and asked that the telegram be read at the Jewish Conference for a World Jewish Congress.

Coty gave financial support to what later became far-right organizations, such as the Faisceau and Croix-de-Feu, a World War I veterans organization; however, he ended his support after a few years. In 1933, surrounded by courtisans, parasites or scoundrels, misled by more seasoned politicians, he published "A Reform of the State" and founded his own movement: French Solidarity. After his death in July 1934, the movement became more radical.

Coty was a Bonapartist, nationalist, fervent defender of a strong Republic with a preponderance of executive power, like a number of his fellow citizens, in this period of the Third Republic. He wrote two books: Against Communism, 1928 and Save our colonies, 1931. In "A Reform of the State", he proposed the election of the President of the Republic by direct universal suffrage, including women's votes, with a term of seven years and the possibility of holding two terms, as well as the creation of a supreme court. These measures were in part, later adopted by the Fifth Republic, established by Charles de Gaulle in 1958.

The Stade François Coty in Ajaccio was named after him.

== Personal life ==
Coty and Yvonne had two children, Roland and Christiane. Despite his marriage, Coty was well known for his numerous mistresses and illegitimate children. He was known to house his lovers in Paris' Hotel Astoria, and to lavish money and gifts on them. His first mistress then second wife was Henriette Dieudé, a former Coty shopgirl who bore him five children. Coty's love life was widely publicized in the French liberal newspapers, to the detriment of his public image.

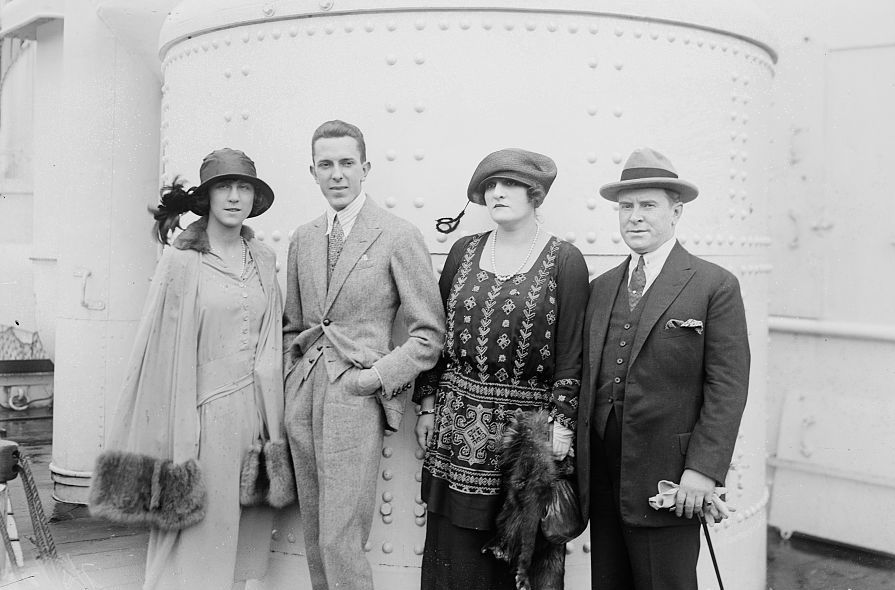
Francois Coty's daughter, Mrs. Dubonnet (Christiane Coty), Christiane's husband, liquor merchant Paul Dubonnet, Francois Coty's wife, Mrs. Coty (Yvonne Alexandrine LeBaron), and French perfumer Francois Coty, in 1918

Coty had a penchant for acquiring and remodeling property. His first major purchase was the Château de Longchamp in 1906, near the Bois de Boulogne, once the property of the famous French civic planner, Georges-Eugène Haussmann. Coty used it as a laboratory in which to design his fragrances, bottles, packaging, and advertisements. The renovated Longchamp included a glass dome by Lalique and a stone tower designed by Gustave Eiffel.

In 1912, he bought the Château d'Artigny near Tours and set out to rebuild it. Over a period of 20 years, Coty rebuilt d'Artigny in a grandiose fashion, installing custom-built kitchens, ballrooms, and a large fresco depicting himself, his family, friends, and even his mistresses. During the 1920s, he resided with his family in a mansion at Avenue Raphael in the Bois de Boulogne, which Coty had rebuilt with etched-glass panels, a stair rail, and a glass ceiling designed by Lalique.

Coty's most famous acquisition was the hunting pavilion of Louveciennes near Saint-Germain-en-Laye, designed by Claude Nicholas Ledoux for Madame du Barry, mistress of Louis XV. Coty had Louveciennes rebuilt to match Ledoux's original plan, but enlarged it to include a perfume laboratory and a third story. He also bought the Château Saint-Hélène in Nice, the Villa Namouna in Beaulieu-sur-Mer, and Le Scudo in Ajaccio, Corsica. Though he owned multiple large residences, Coty often lived in a hotel on the Champs-Élysées. He was something of a recluse, disliking crowds of any kind, and hiding behind his public image.

After 1929, Coty's fortunes began to diminish considerably. Both Figaro and L'Ami du peuple had been losing money for years and his perfume business had been affected by the 1929 Wall Street crash. But it was his divorce that most contributed to his financial ruin.

In 1929, Yvonne divorced Coty and married Leon Cotnareanu. Their divorce settlement stipulated that Coty would pay his ex-wife several millions of francs in three installments, but in 1931 Coty defaulted on the last payment, citing financial hardship. Over the next few years, divorce courts ruled in favor of Yvonne, and granted her ownership of most of Coty's fortune and his newspapers.

He died in 1934 at his home in Louveciennes, of pneumonia and complications after an aneurysm.

In 1963, Yvonne sold Coty to pharmaceutical giant Pfizer, with the stipulation that no member of the Coty family would be involved in the company. Under Pfizer, the company began to distribute its perfumes almost exclusively through drugstores, instead of in department stores as it had previously done. In 1992, Pfizer sold Coty to the German company Joh. A. Benckiser GmbH, which owns it today.

== List of creations ==
Advertisement for La Rose Jacqueminot - Coty design Leonetto Cappiello circa 1904.

François Coty was a pioneer in the field of perfumery, creating countless masterpieces, many now preserved in the archives of the Osmothèque. His most notable perfumes include:

- La Rose Jacqueminot (1904): a floral perfume based on the Jacqueminot Rose
- L'Origan (The Golden One) (1905): a floral amber fragrance
- Ambre Antique (1905): a soft amber fragrance
- Cologne Cordon Vert (1905)
- L'Ambréine (1906)
- Jasmin de Corse (1906)
- La Violette Pourpre (1906)
- L'Effleurt (1907)
- Cologne Cordon Rouge (1909)
- Le Muguet (Lily of the Valley) (1910)
- Lilas Blanc (1910)
- Styx (1911)
- Au Coeur des Calices (1912)
- L'Or (1912)
- Cyclamen (1913)
- L'Entraînement (1913)
- Iris (1913)
- Héliotrope (1913)
- Jacinthe (1914)
- Lilas Pourpre (1914)
- La Violette Ambrée (1914)
- L’Oeillet France (1914)
- Chypre (1917): one of Coty's greatest successes, that gave its name to an entire fragrance family
- La Feuillaison (1920)
- Emeraude (fragrance) (Emerald) (1921): an amber fragrance similar in composition to Guerlain Shalimar (1925)
- Idylle (1922)
- Le Nouveau Cyclamen (1922)
- Paris (1923): a floral fragrance
- Knize Ten (1924), with Vincent Roubert
- L'Aimant (The Magnet) (1927), with Vincent Roubert: a floral aldehyde perfume, said to be Coty's reply to Chanel No. 5
- A Suma (1934), with Vincent Roubert

== See also ==
- French Third Republic
- Jean Despres

== Bibliography ==
- Toledano, Roulhac (2009), François Coty: Fragrance, Power, Money, Gretna, Louisiana: Pelican, p. 336, ISBN 978-1-58980-639-9.
- Healy, Orla (2004), Coty: the Brand of Visionary, New York City: Assouline, p. 240, ISBN 2-84323-622-3.
- Sicard-Picchiottino, Ghislaine (2006), François Coty : Un industriel corse sous la IIIe République (in French), Albiana, p. 313, ISBN 2846981736
- Alain Duménil (2009). Parfum d'Empire, la vie extraordinaire de François Coty (in French). Plon. p. 247. ISBN 978-2259210317.
- Michael De Fina; Randall Bruce Monsen (2000). A Century of Perfume: The Perfumes of Francois Coty. Monsen and Baer. p. 128. ISBN 9781928655008.
