= Corse-du-Sud's 1st constituency =

Constituency of the National Assembly of France

- Constituency for the National Assembly
- Boundary of Corse-du-Sud's 1st constituency in Corse-du-Sud

- Location of Corse-du-Sud within France
- Department: Corse-du-Sud
- Region: Corsica
- Population: 74,186 (2013)
- Electorate: 50,873 (2017)

Current constituency
- Deputy: Laurent Marcangeli
- Political party: H
- Parliamentary group: HOR

Corse-du-Sud's 1st constituency is one of two French legislative constituencies in the department of Corse-du-Sud. It is currently represented by Laurent Marcangeli of Horizons.

== Historic representation ==
Legislature	Start of mandate	End of mandate	Deputy	Party
6th	3 April 1978	22 May 1981	Jean Bozzi	RPR
7th	2 July 1981	1 April 1986	Nicolas Alfonsi	MRG
8th	2 April 1986	14 May 1988	Proportional representation	
9th	23 June 1988	1 April 1993	José Rossi	UDF
10th	2 April 1993	17 November 1994	José Rossi	UDF
10th	18 November 1994	28 June 1995	Marc Marcangeli	CCB
10th	29 June 1995	9 September 1995	Vacant	
10th	10 September 1995	21 April 1997	José Rossi	UDF
11th	12 June 1997	18 June 2002	José Rossi	UDF
12th	19 June 2002	19 June 2007	Simon Renucci	DVG
13th	20 June 2007	19 June 2012	Simon Renucci	DVG
14th	20 June 2012	20 June 2017	Laurent Marcangeli	UMP
15th	21 June 2017	21 June 2022	Jean-Jacques Ferrara	LR
16th	22 June 2022	ongoing	Laurent Marcangeli	H

== Elections ==
=== 2024 ===
Candidate	Party	Alliance	First round		Second round	
Candidate	Party	Alliance	Votes	%	Votes	%
Laurent Marcangeli	H	Ensemble	10,210	30.70	20,893	63.20
Ariane Quarena	RN		10,377	31.20	12,164	36.80
Romain Colonna	Femu a Corsica	REG	5,601	16.84		
Marc-Antoine Leroy	PCF	NPF	3,125	9.40		
Lisandru Luciani	IND	Miscellaneous far-right	1,202	3.61		
Didier Quilichini	LO		133	0.40		
Jean-François Luciani	PNC	REG	1,078	3.24		
Valid votes			33,259	98.29	33,057	95.38
Blank votes			370	1.09	1,004	2.90
Null votes			210	0.62	599	1.73
Turnout			33,839	64.47	34,660	66.04
Abstentions			18,651	35.53	17,827	33.96
Registered voters			52,490		52,487	
Result			HOR HOLD			

=== 2022 ===
Legislative Election 2022: Corse-du-Sud's 1st constituency
Party	Candidate	Votes	%	±%
HOR (Ensemble)	Laurent Marcangeli	7,972	33.70	+12.24
Femu a Corsica (REG)	Romain Colonna	4,135	17.48	-3.97
RN	Nathaly Antona	3,003	12.69	+0.55
REG	Jean-Paul Carrolaggi	3,002	12.69	−8.72
DVC	Michel Mozziconacci	2,193	9.27	N/A
LFI	Robin de Mari	1,281	5.41	−1.46
REC	David Quintela	738	3.12	N/A
PCF	Anissa-Flore Amziane	522	2.21	−0.55
PS	Angélique Susini	353	1.49	N/A
Others	N/A	460	-	−
Turnout		23,659	46.25	+0.60
2nd round result
HOR (Ensemble)	Laurent Marcangeli	12,013	51.76	+26.75
Femu a Corsica (REG)	Romain Colonna	11,195	48.24	N/A
Turnout		23,208	47.37	+6.61
HOR gain from LR				

=== 2017 ===
Candidate	Label	First round		Second round	
Candidate	Label	Votes	%	Votes	%
Jean-Jacques Ferrara	LR	7,603	33.50	12,278	64.99
Maria Guidicelli	REM	4,872	21.46	6,614	35.01
Jean-Paul Carrolaggi	REG (PaC)	4,859	21.41		
Francis Nadizi	FN	2,756	12.14		
Jacques Casamarta	FI	1,559	6.87		
Anissa-Flore Amziane	PCF	627	2.76		
Corinne Bucchini	EXD	153	0.67		
Estelle Jaquet	EXG	113	0.50		
Jérôme Bianchi	DIV	109	0.48		
Jean-Yves Santini	DIV	47	0.21		
Jean-Jacques Comiti	DIV	0	0.00		
Votes		22,698	100.00	18,892	100.00
Valid votes		22,698	97.71	18,892	91.10
Blank votes		331	1.42	1,058	5.10
Null votes		200	0.86	787	3.80
Turnout		23,229	45.65	20,737	40.76
Abstentions		27,651	54.35	30,136	59.24
Registered voters		50,880		50,873	
Source: Ministry of the Interior

=== 2012 ===
2012 legislative election in Corse-Du-Sud's 1st constituency
Candidate	Party	First round		Second round	
Candidate	Party	Votes	%	Votes	%
Laurent Marcangeli	UMP	8,282	30.75%	14,066	50.52%
Simon Renucci	DVG (CSD–PS–PRG)	7,914	29.39%	13,779	49.48%
José Risticoni	FN	2,767	10.27%		
Romain Colonna	EELV	2,423	9.00%		
Paul-Antoine Luciani	FG	2,040	7.57%		
Paul-Mathieu Leonetti	CL	1,785	6.63%		
Jean-Marc Cresp	PR	1,301	4.83%		
Yves Daien	LO	74	0.27%		
Pierre-Noël Tucci	GE	0	0.00%		
Valid votes		26,932	98.73%	27,845	96.29%
Spoilt and null votes		346	1.27%	1,074	3.71%
Votes cast / turnout		27,278	57.00%	28,919	60.43%
Abstentions		20,576	43.00%	18,934	39.57%
Registered voters		47,854	100.00%	47,853	100.00%
