= Bonapartist Central Committee =

Bonapartist Central Committee Comité central bonapartiste
- Leader: André Villanova
- Founded: 1908
- Headquarters: 8, cours Grandval; 20000 Ajaccio
- Ideology: Localism; Regionalism; Bonapartism; Conservatism; Constitutional monarchism Historical: Fascism (1930s–1940s); Gaullism (intermittently)
- Political position: Centre-right; Historical: Right-wing to far-right
- Colours: Purple, blue, black
- Slogan: Tout pour le peuple et par le peuple
- Corsican Assembly: 10 / 63
- National Assembly: 1 / 577
- Mayors (Corsica): 1 / 360

Election symbol

The Bonapartist Central Committee (French: Comité central bonapartiste, CCB; Corsican: Cumitatu cintrali bunapartista) is a political party on the French island of Corsica, operating mainly in Ajaccio. It was founded in 1908.

== History ==
The CCB in its first few years heavily relied on the personality of Dominique Pugliesi-Conti, who served as Mayor of Ajaccio from 1904 to 1910. Pugliesi-Conti was elected as a deputy to the National Assembly in 1910 and openly declared his support for the republic, resulting in numerous monarchist Bonapartists challenging him for his seat in 1914. Pugliesi-Conti served in the National Assembly until he failed to win re-election in 1919.

Following the Pugliesi-Conti era, the party was led into elections by Dominique Paoli (who served as Mayor of Ajaccio from 1925 to May 1931 and from 1934 to 1943), with industrialist François Coty (who served as a senator from Corsica from 1923 to 1924 and as Mayor of Ajaccio from May 1931 to August 1934) acting as the party's leader and main financier until his death. The party was sympathetic to fascism and Italy in the lead up to, and during, World War II, also collaborating with Vichy France. Eugène Macchini, who was serving as the party's president in the leadup to the war, disagreed with this line and joined the French Resistance in 1943. In 1943 Paoli was deposed by communist members of the resistance and was exiled to Laghouat in French Algeria, although was allowed to return to France following the war. The CCB, discredited from its collaboration with the invading forces, was heavily defeated in the first municipal elections held thereafter, in 1945.

From 1945 to 1947 Ajaccio was governed by a coalition led by Artur Giovoni of the French Communist Party. The CCB allied itself with moderates and radicals and managed to elect its candidate, Nicéphore Stephanopoli de Comnene, as Mayor of Ajaccio. Antoine Sérafini replaced him after two years. In 1950, the law formally exiling members of the House of Bonaparte was repealed. Sérafini decided to run for a seat in the National Assembly in 1951, supported by Gaullists and the Rally of the French People. Some Bonapartists, opposing this, left the party and formed a list with the Communist Party and the radicals around François Maglioli aiming to defeat the CCB in the 1953 municipal elections, which was successful. The CCB saw its electoral performance decline shortly thereafter, with Sérafini losing his National Assembly seat in 1956 and the CCB under Sérafini losing the cantonal elections in 1958. After the return of Charles de Gaulle to power, the CCB turned against him, supporting the May 1958 coup attempt. Sérafini returned to the mayorship of Ajaccio in 1959, and to the National Assembly in 1962. The CCB then changed its position again, supporting de Gaulle's re-election campaign in 1965.

In 1971, the CCB, led by Pascal Rossini, won the municipal elections in Ajaccio by a large margin, with Rossini becoming mayor as well. Following his death in 1975, he was replaced by Charles Ornano, another CCB member who won the by-election. Ornano was re-elected for a full term in 1977. During Ornano's leadership, the CCB began to falter with regards to its political allies. In 1983, the CCB was forced to ally itself with the Union for French Democracy (UDF) and Rally for the Republic (RPR) in a list where it no longer held a majority of seats in order to stave off a left-wing victory in Ajaccio. Ornano was re-elected in 1989, but he died in 1994 before he could finish his term, being replaced by Marc Marcangeli, also of the CCB.

Shortly after, the party's support began to collapse after a member of the House of Bonaparte, Charles, Prince Napoléon, announced he would enter local political life, endorsing the mainly centre-left Régions et Peuples Solidaires coalition for the 1994 European Parliament election. The incumbent CCB-UDF coalition governing Ajaccio soon became dysfunctional following poor performances in the regional and cantonal elections in 1998. The coalition lost the following municipal election in 2001 to an alliance of the miscellaneous left, with Simon Renucci elected mayor and Charles, Prince Napoléon serving as deputy mayor. The CCB, although still registered, became inactive soon after, with no notable activity until 2014.

In 2013/2014, the party was re-activated under the leadership of André Villanova, and began attempting to reconcile with the more liberal views of contemporary politics in Ajaccio, supporting the list of UMP member Laurent Marcangeli in the 2014 Corse-du-Sud municipal elections. After his victory, he was made an honorary member of the CCB, the first such person to receive the distinction. After winning partial municipal elections the following year as well, the CCB managed to elect members to the Municipal Council once again, including a deputy mayor of Ajaccio and a vice president of the Communauté d'agglomération du Pays Ajaccien. Pierre-Jean Luciani, a member of the party, held the executive (President of the Departmental Council) of Corse-du-Sud from 2015 to 2018. For the 2022 French legislative election, the party, along with the incumbent presidential coalition, endorsed Marcangeli's candidacy in Corse-du-Sud's 1st constituency as a member of Horizons. After his victory, he was made president of the Horizons group in the National Assembly on 22 June.

== Bibliography ==
- Histoire d'Ajaccio, La Marge Édition, 1993
- Ça s'est passé en Corse, Paul Silvani, Éditions Autres Temps, 1995
- Le Mémorial des Corses, volumes 3 and 4, 1979-80
- Le Bonapartisme, Une saga Corse, Paul Silvani, Éditions Albiana, 2003
- Histoire de la Corse du xvii^{e} siècle à nos jours, Michel Vergé-Franceschi, Éditions du Félin, 2000
- Histoire de la Corse, edited by Paul Arrighi, Privat Éditeur, 1974
