= Simon Renucci =

French politician

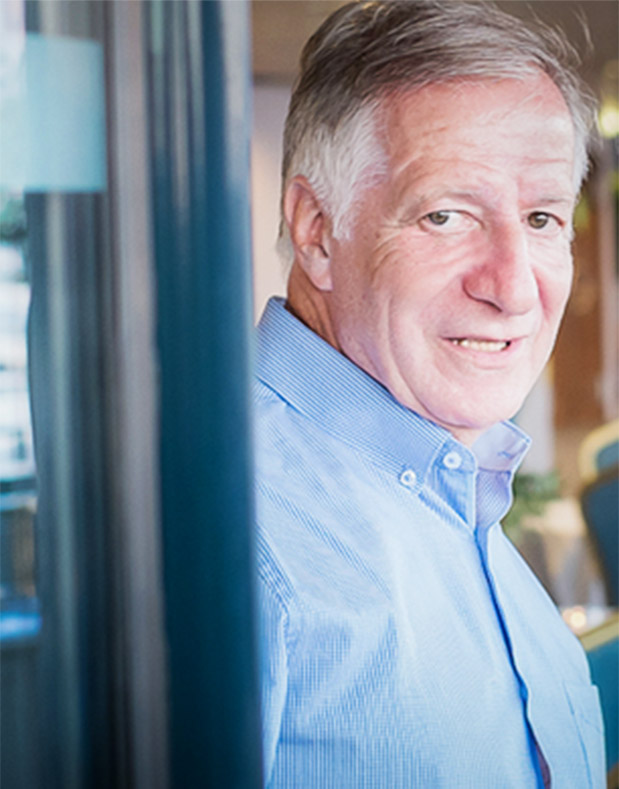
Simon Renucci (2014)

Simon Renucci (born March 29, 1945) was a member of the National Assembly of France. He represented the Corse-du-Sud department from 2002 to 2012 as a member of the Socialiste, radical, citoyen et divers gauche. He also served as Mayor of Ajaccio from 2001 to 2014.
