= List of civil service ministers of France =

Minister of Public Transformation and Service of the French Republic
- Ministre de la Transformation et de la Fonction publiques

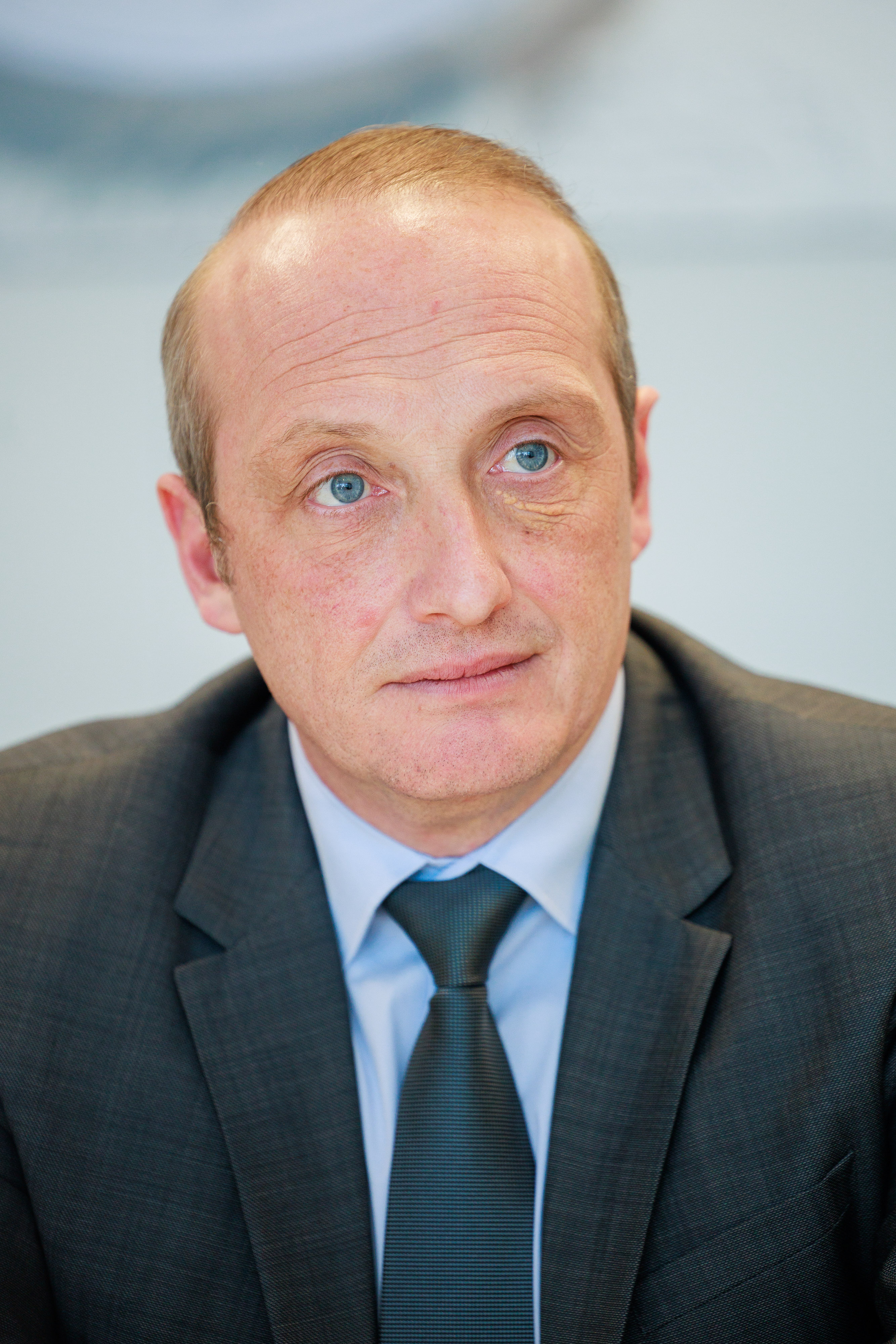
- Incumbent; Laurent Marcangeli since 23 December 2024
- Ministry of Public Service
- Style: Minister
- Member of: Council of Ministers
- Reports to: President of the Republic and to Parliament
- Nominator: Prime Minister
- Appointer: President of the Republic
- Term length: No fixed term
- Formation: 20 February 1932
- Website: Official website

Below is a list of civil service ministers in the Government of France since the establishment of the Fourth Republic. Since 23 December 2024, Laurent Marcangeli has been Minister of Civil Action, Civil Service, and Simplification under Prime Minister François Bayrou.

== List ==
=== Fourth Republic ===
==== Under Vincent Auriol ====
- 19 February – 4 May 1947: Maurice Thorez, Minister of State
- 4 May – 22 October 1947: Pierre-Henri Teitgen, Minister of State
- 26 November 1947 – 2 July 1950: Jean Biondi, Secretary of State
- 2–12 July 1950: Paul Giacobbi, Minister of State
- 12 July 1950 – 11 August 1951: Pierre Métayer, Secretary of State
- 20 January – 8 March 1952: Bernard Lafay, Secretary of State

==== Under René Coty ====
- 30 June – 12 November 1954: Jean Masson, Secretary of State
- 12 November 1954 – 23 February 1955: René Billières, Secretary of State
- 1 February 1956 – 13 June 1957: Pierre Métayer, Secretary of State
- 17 June – 6 November 1957: Jean Meunier, Secretary of State
- 11 November 1957 – 14 May 1958: Raymond Marcellin, Secretary of State
- 14 June 1958 – 8 January 1959: Guy Mollet, Minister of State

=== Fifth Republic ===
==== Under Charles de Gaulle ====
- 8 January – 28 May 1959: Pierre Chatenet, Secretary of State
- 24 July 1959 – 15 January 1960: Louis Joxe, Secretary of State
- 19 March 1960 – 14 April 1962: Pierre Guillaumat, Minister delegate
- 14 April – 28 November 1962: Jean de Broglie, Secretary of State
- 6 December 1962 – 6 April 1967: Louis Joxe, Minister of State
- 6 April 1967 – 31 May 1968: Edmond Michelet, Minister of State
- 31 May – 10 July 1968: Robert Boulin, Minister
- 12 July 1968 – 20 June 1969: Philippe Malaud, Secretary of State

==== Under Georges Pompidou ====
- 22 June 1969 – 2 April 1973: Philippe Malaud, Secretary of State
- 20 April 1973 – 27 February 1974: Paul Dijoud, Secretary of State
- 23 October 1973 – 27 February 1974: Philippe Malaud, Minister
- 1 March – 28 May 1974: Christian Poncelet, Secretary of State

==== Under Valéry Giscard d'Estaing ====
- 28 May – 29 October 1974: Roger Poudonson, Secretary of State
- 29 October 1974 – 27 August 1976: Gabriel Péronnet, Secretary of State
- 27 August 1976 – 6 April 1978: Maurice Ligot, Secretary of State
- 2 April 1978 – 22 May 1981: Jacques Dominati, Secretary of State

==== Under François Mitterrand ====
- 21 May – 23 June 1981: Catherine Lalumière, Secretary of State
- 23 June 1981 – 23 July 1984: Anicet Le Pors, Minister delegate
- 23 July 1984 – 20 March 1986: Jean Le Garrec, Secretary of State
- 20 March 1986 – 12 May 1988: Hervé de Charette, Minister delegate
- 12 May 1988 – 16 May 1991: Michel Durafour, Minister
- 16 May 1991 – 28 March 1992: Jean-Pierre Soisson, Minister of State
- 4 April 1992 – 30 March 1993: Michel Delebarre, Minister of State
- 30 March 1993 – 18 May 1995: André Rossinot, Minister

==== Under Jacques Chirac ====
- 18 May – 6 November 1995: Jean Puech, Minister
- 6 November 1995 – 4 June 1997 : Dominique Perben, Minister
- 4 June 1997 – 27 March 2000: Émile Zuccarelli, Minister
- 27 March 2000 – 7 May 2002: Michel Sapin, Minister
- 7 May 2002 – 30 March 2004: Jean-Paul Delevoye, Minister
- 31 March 2004 – 31 May 2005: Renaud Dutreil, Minister
- 2 June 2005 – 15 May 2007: Christian Jacob, Minister

==== Under Nicolas Sarkozy ====
- 19 June 2007 – 23 June 2009: André Santini, Secretary of State
- 22 March 2010 – 29 May 2011: Georges Tron, Secretary of State
- 29 June 2011 – 10 May 2012: François Sauvadet, Minister

==== Under François Hollande ====
- 16 May 2012 – 11 February 2016: Marylise Lebranchu, Minister
- 11 February 2016 – 15 May 2017: Annick Girardin, Minister

==== Under Emmanuel Macron ====
- 15 May 2017 – 6 July 2020: Gérald Darmanin, Minister
- 6 July 2020 – 20 May 2022: Amélie de Montchalin, Minister
- 20 May 2022 – 21 September 2024: Stanislas Guérini, Minister
- 21 September 2024 – 23 December 2024: Guillaume Kasbarian, Minister
- 23 December 2024 – Present: Laurent Marcangeli, Minister
