= Maison Bonaparte =

Family home of Napoleon Bonaparte

Coordinates: 41°55′04″N 8°44′18″E

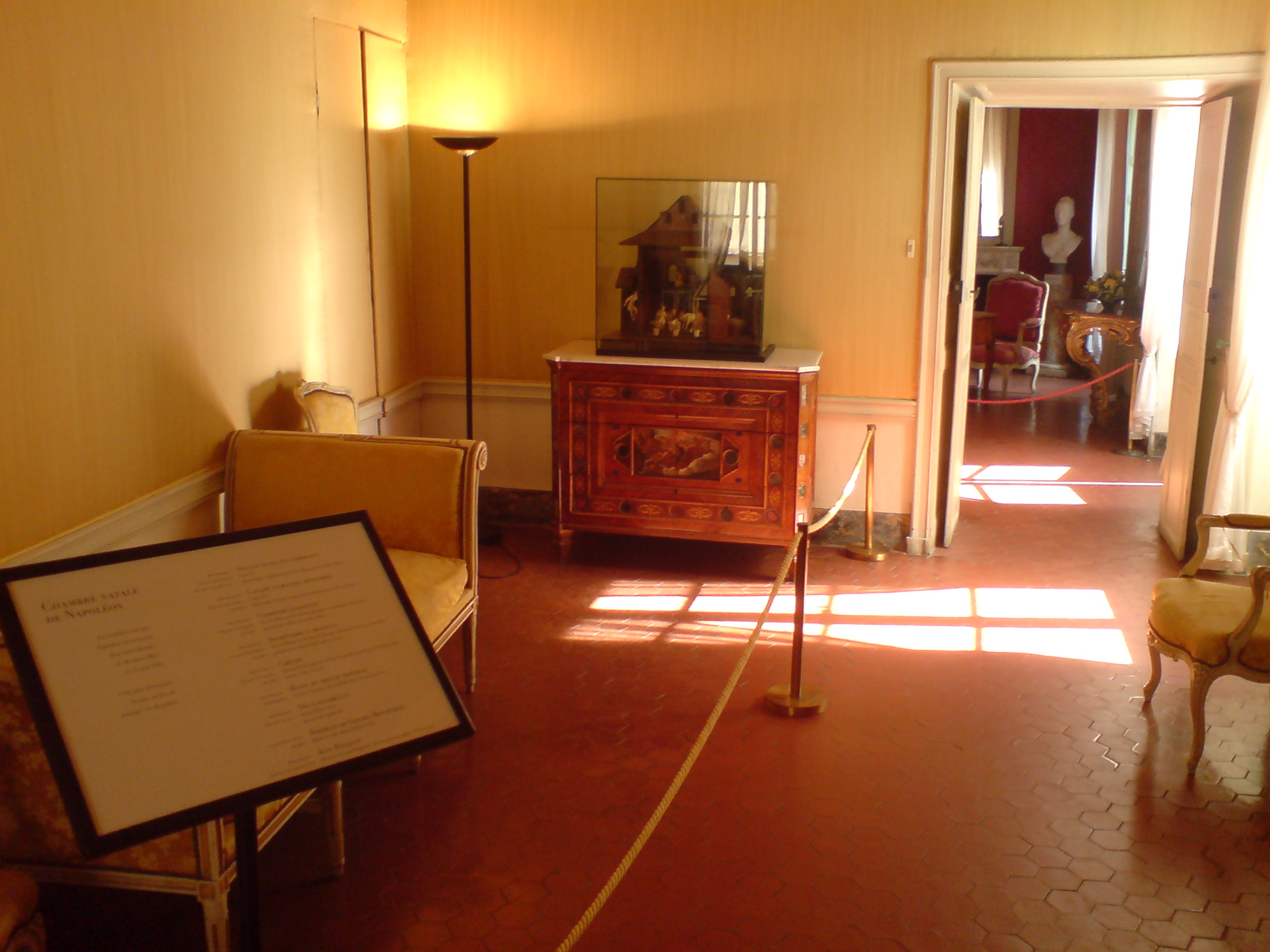
The room where Napoleon Bonaparte was born in 1769

Maison Bonaparte (Corsican and Italian: Casa Buonaparte) is the ancestral home of the Bonaparte family. It is located on the Rue Saint-Charles in Ajaccio on the French island of Corsica. The house was almost continuously owned by members of the family from 1682 to 1923.

== History ==
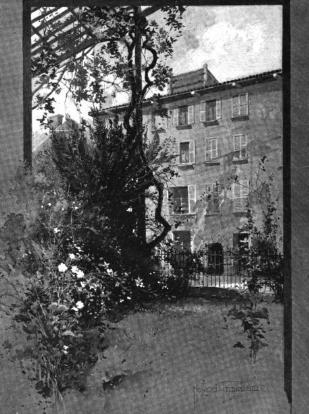
1895 sketch of Casa Buonaparte

Napoleon Bonaparte's great-great-grandfather Giuseppe Buonaparte first moved into the Casa Buonaparte in 1682. Originally, the house was partitioned between different families; however, after Giuseppe married Maria Colonna di Bozzi, who owned a portion of the house, he purchased the remaining sections. The house was later expanded and re-decorated by Carlo Buonaparte after his marriage to Maria Letizia Ramolino. With the exception of Joseph Bonaparte, all of their children were born in the Casa Buonaparte.

Eight years after Carlo Bonaparte's death in 1785, the family came into conflict with the increasingly reactionary nationalist leader, Pasquale Paoli, and was forced to flee to the French mainland. Paoli's followers looted and burned much of the Casa Buonaparte. After the arrival of Admiral Samuel Hood, British officers were also billeted there. According to legend, Hudson Lowe lived there briefly; however, this is unconfirmed.

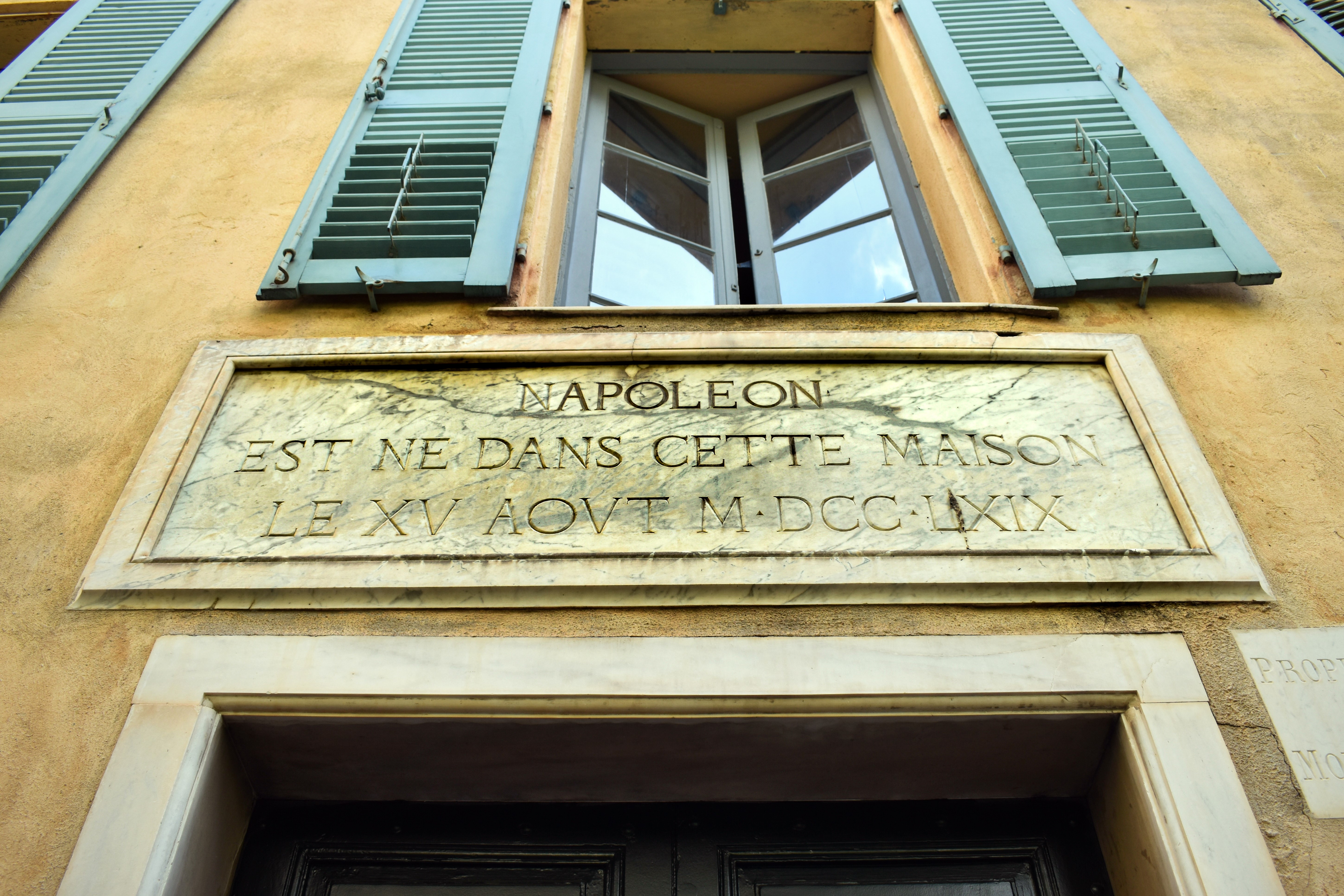
Plaque of Maison Bonaparte, inscribed: "NAPOLEON EST NE DANS CETTE MAISON LE XV AOVT M•DCC•LXIX" or "NAPOLEON WAS BORN IN THIS HOUSE ON 15 AUGUST 1769"

After the withdrawal of British troops from Corsica in 1797, the Bonaparte family returned to the Casa Buonaparte and began repairing and remodeling it with funds provided by the Directory.

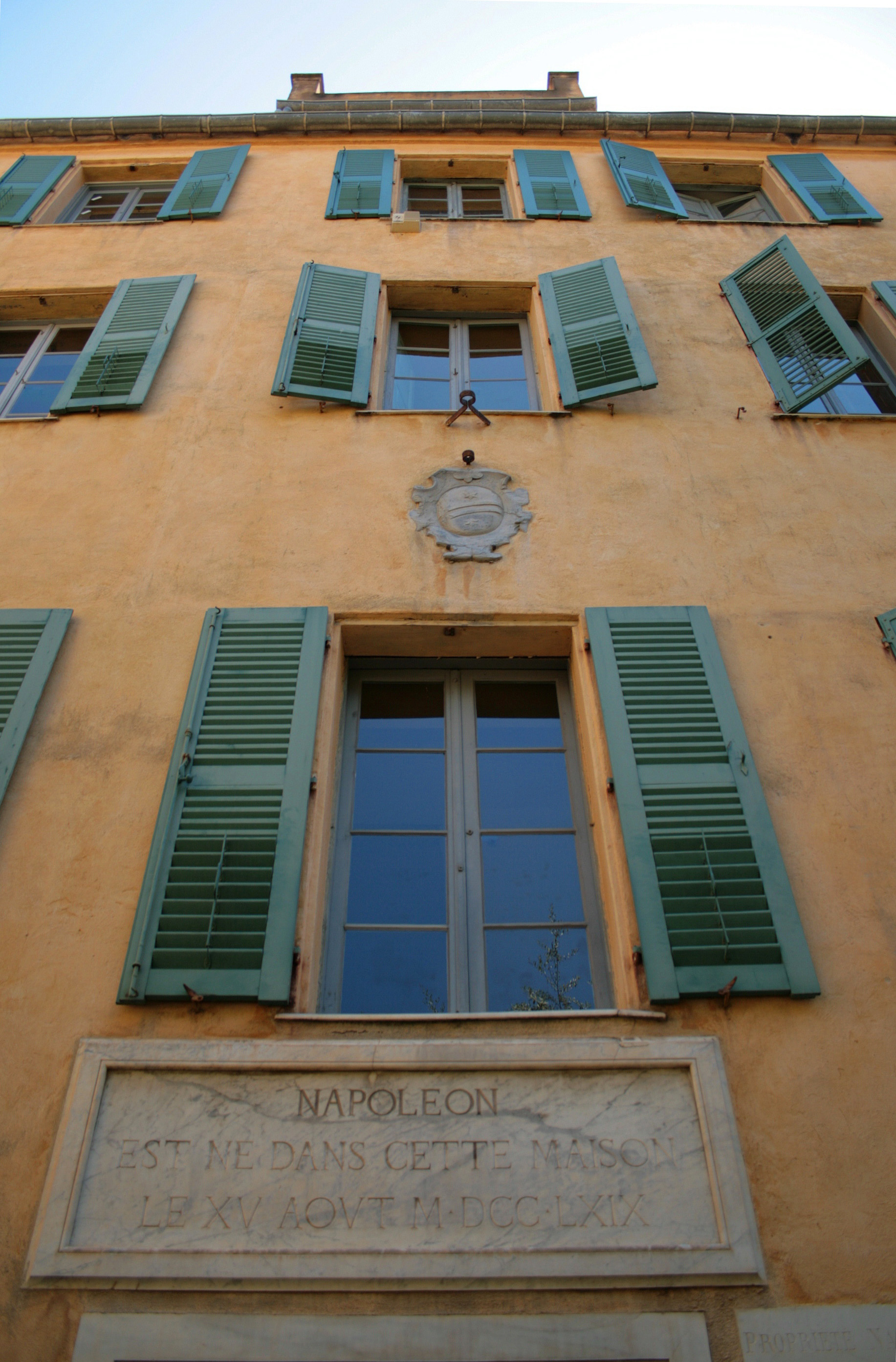
The house museum in July 2008

When the Bonaparte family left Corsica again in 1799, they left the house in the care of Napoleon's wet nurse, Camilla Ilari. Napoleon later bequeathed the house to his mother's cousin, André Ramolino, who gave his own house to Camilla in exchange. Later, first Maria and then Joseph took possession of the house. In 1852, Joseph's daughter Zénaïde gave the Casa Buonaparte to Napoleon III and Empress Eugénie. Eugénie refurbished and expanded the house in order to celebrate the 100th anniversary of Napoleon's birth. She later passed the house to Prince Victor Napoleon who donated the house to the French government. In 1967, the house was made into a museum and declared a national museum.

== See also ==
- Arboretum des Milelli - a summer retreat outside of Ajaccio
