= Laurent Marcangeli =

French politician (born 1980)

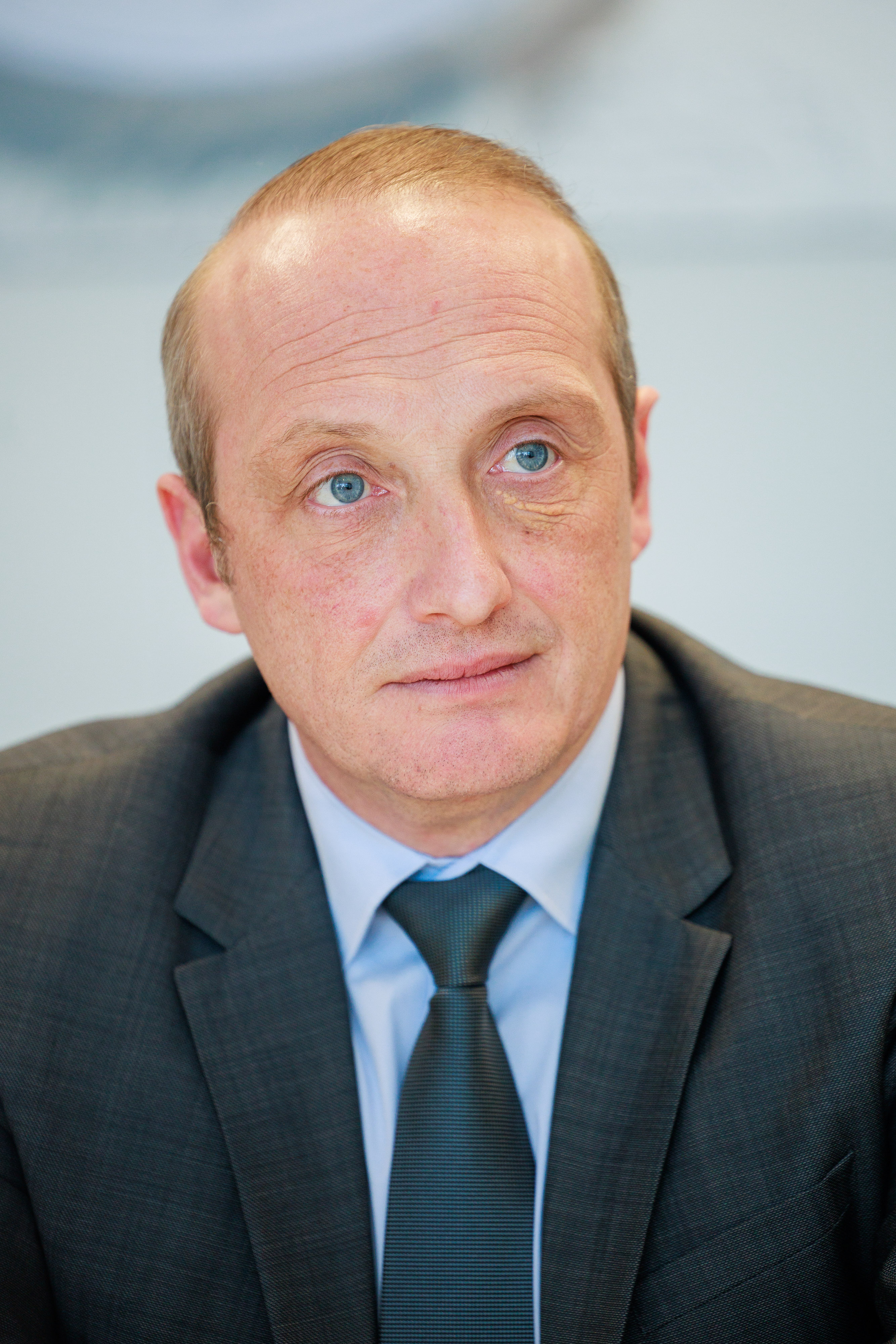

Minister of Public Action, Civil Service and Simplification
- In office 23 December 2024 – 5 October 2025
- Prime Minister: François Bayrou
- Preceded by: Guillaume Kasbarian
- Succeeded by: Naïma Moutchou

President of the Horizons group in the National Assembly
- In office 28 June 2022 – 23 January 2025
- Preceded by: Position established
- Succeeded by: Paul Christophe

Member of the National Assembly for Corse-du-Sud's 1st constituency
- Incumbent
- Assumed office 5 November 2025
- Preceded by: Xavier Lacombe
- In office 22 June 2022 – 23 January 2025
- Preceded by: Jean-Jacques Ferrara
- Succeeded by: Xavier Lacombe
- In office 20 June 2012 – 20 June 2017
- Preceded by: Simon Renucci
- Succeeded by: Jean-Jacques Ferrara

Mayor of Ajaccio
- In office 8 February 2015 – 9 July 2022
- Preceded by: André Valat (Note: As president of the special delegation.)
- Succeeded by: Stéphane Sbraggia
- In office 5 April 2014 – 27 October 2014
- Preceded by: Simon Renucci
- Succeeded by: André Valat

Personal details
- Born: 10 December 1980 (age 45) Ajaccio, Corsica, France
- Party: CCB (2013–present); HOR (2021–present)
- Other political affiliations: RPR (1997–2002); UMP (2002–2015); LR (2015–2018)
- Education: University of Corsica Pasquale Paoli
- Occupation: Lawyer

Laurent Marcangeli (French pronunciation: [lɔʁɑ̃ maʁkɑ̃ʒeli]; born 10 December 1980) is a French politician. He represents the 1st constituency of Corse-du-Sud in the National Assembly, serving from 2012 to 2017, 2022 to January 2025 and again from November 2025. Between his second and third terms, he was Minister of Public Action, Civil Service and Simplification under Prime Minister François Bayrou from 2024 to 2025.

Earlier in his career, Marcangeli held the mayorship of Ajaccio, the capital of Corsica, in 2014 and from 2015 to 2022. He was a member of the nationwide right-wing parties Rally for the Republic (RPR), Union for a Popular Movement (UMP) and The Republicans (LR) before starting his own party "Ajaccio !" in 2018.

In 2022, Marcangeli stood for Parliament for the recently established centre-right party Horizons, part of President Emmanuel Macron's Ensemble Citoyens coalition. Following the election, he became president of the newly-established Horizons group in the National Assembly. He is also a member of the monarchist Corsican party Bonapartist Central Committee which supports the restoration of the House of Bonaparte to the French throne.

== Early life and education ==
Marcangeli was born in Ajaccio, Corsica. Though not directly related to Marc Marcangeli, who held the mayorship from 1994 to 2001 and served in the National Assembly for the same constituency as him briefly in 1994 and 1995, the two are distant cousins. His mother was a Corsican nationalist trade unionist for postal workers, and his father worked for the nationalist Edmond Simeoni.

In contrast to his parents and his classmates at University of Corsica Pasquale Paoli, he joined the French right-wing party Rally for the Republic at 17. He studied Public Law and History and wrote a master's degree thesis on Charles de Gaulle's relations with Corsica.

== Political career ==
Marcangeli was voted onto the municipal council of Ajaccio in 2008 and the general council of Corse-du-Sud in 2011, holding the canton of Ajaccio-1 seat.

In 2012, Marcangeli became Corsica's youngest member of the National Assembly, winning an election against Ajaccio's Socialist Mayor Simon Renucci to represent Corse-du-Sud's 1st constituency. In Parliament, he served on the Committee on Social Affairs.

=== Mayor of Ajaccio, 2014, 2015–2022 ===
In March 2014, Marcangeli was elected mayor of Ajaccio, beating Renucci by 47% to 46%.

The 2014 election was annulled by a court in October of that year due to irregularities, and Marcangeli resigned. The election was run again in February 2015, and he won by 59.25% to 40.75%.

Marcangeli endorsed former Prime Minister Alain Juppé in the primaries to represent The Republicans in the 2017 French presidential election. In the election itself, he backed François Fillon, but publicly withdrew support in March 2017.

In February 2018, Marcangeli quit The Republicans due to disagreements with party president Laurent Wauquiez. In September, he set up a new party, "Ajaccio !".

Marcangeli took part in the 2021 regional elections as a candidate for president of the Corsican Executive Council. His nomination, Un soffiu novu, was endorsed by the Republicans, the Bonapartist Central Committee and the Union of Democrats and Independents. He received 24.86% of the vote in the first round, behind incumbent Gilles Simeoni of Femu a Corsica (29.19%). In the runoff, he came second of four candidates behind Simeoni (40.64% to 32.02%).

=== Member of the National Assembly, 2022–2024 ===
Marcangeli stood again in Corse-du-Sud's 1st constituency in the 2022 French legislative election as a member of Horizons, within President Emmanuel Macron's Ensemble Citoyens coalition. He came first in the first round with 33.7% of the vote, to face Romain Colonna of Femu a Corsica (17.48%) in the second round. He won the runoff with 51.8% of the votes.

In parliament, Marcangeli served on the Committee on Foreign Affairs. In addition to his committee assignments, he chaired the French-Italian Parliamentary Friendship Group.

From 2022, Marcangeli chaired the Horizons party’s parliamentary group.

In the 2024 French legislative election, Marcangeli came second in the first round of voting in his constituency, with 30.7% compared to 31.2% for Ariane Quarena of the National Rally in the runoff, Marcangeli won with 63.2% against Quarena.

=== Minister of Public Action, Civil Service and Simplification, 2024–2025 ===
On 23 December 2024, Marcangeli was named Minister of Public Action, Civil Service and Simplification in the government of prime minister of France François Bayrou. On 5 October 2025, he was not retained for the incoming government of Sébastien Lecornu. A month later, he returned to his seat in the National Assembly.

== Political positions ==
Marcangeli favours giving the Corsican language official status alongside French and wants special status for the island in the French constitution.
