= Corse-du-Sud =

Corse-du-Sud Corsica suttana / Pumonte (Corsican) / Pumonti (Corsican) Southern Corsica
- Department
- Pumonte
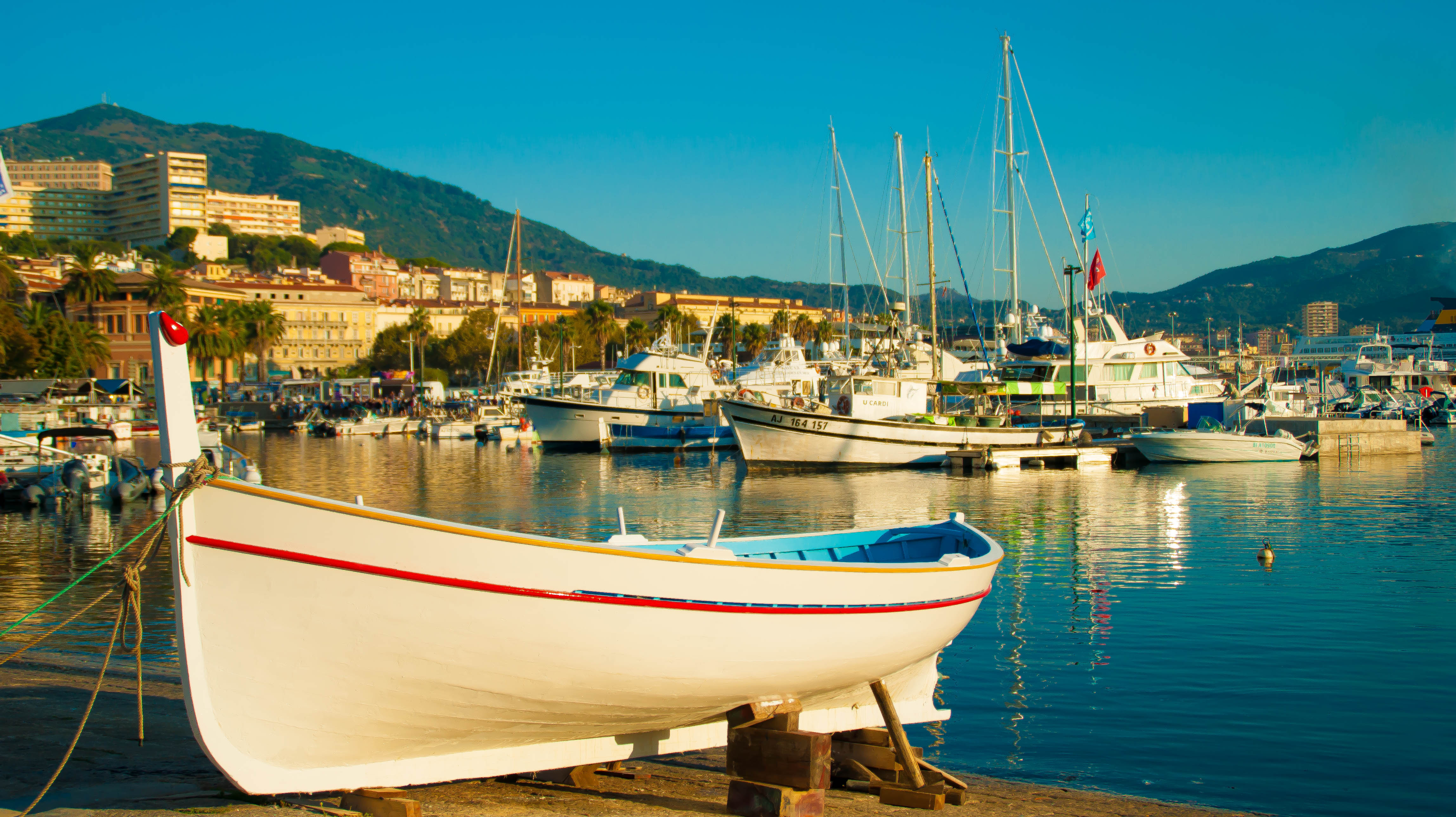
- Port Tino Rossi

- Flag Coat of arms

- Location of Corse-du-Sud in France
- Coordinates: 41°51′N 9°2′E
- Country: France
- Region: Corsica
- Prefecture: Ajaccio
- Subprefectures: Sartène

Government
  - Prefect: Amaury de Saint-Quentin

Area^{1}
  - Total: 4,014 km^{2} (1,550 sq mi)

Population (2023)
  - Total: 168,306
  - Rank: 96th
  - Density: 41.93/km^{2} (108.6/sq mi)
- Time zone: UTC+1 (CET)
  - Summer (DST): UTC+2 (CEST)
- Department number: 2A
- Arrondissements: 2
- Cantons: 11
- Communes: 124
- ^1 French Land Register data, which exclude estuaries, and lakes, ponds, and glaciers larger than 1 km^{2}

Corse-du-Sud (French pronunciation: [kɔʁs dy syd]; Corsican: Corsica suttana [ˈkorsiga zutˈtana], Pumonte [puˈmɔntɛ] (Note: Also Italian: [puˈmonte].) or Pumonti [puˈmɔnti]; English: Southern Corsica) is an administrative department of France, consisting of the southern part of the island of Corsica. The corresponding departmental territorial collectivity merged with that of Haute-Corse on 1 January 2018, forming the single territorial collectivity of Corsica, with territorial elections coinciding with the dissolution of the separate council. Although its administrative powers were ceded to the new territorial collectivity, it remains an administrative department in its own right. In 2023, it had a population of 158,507.

== History ==
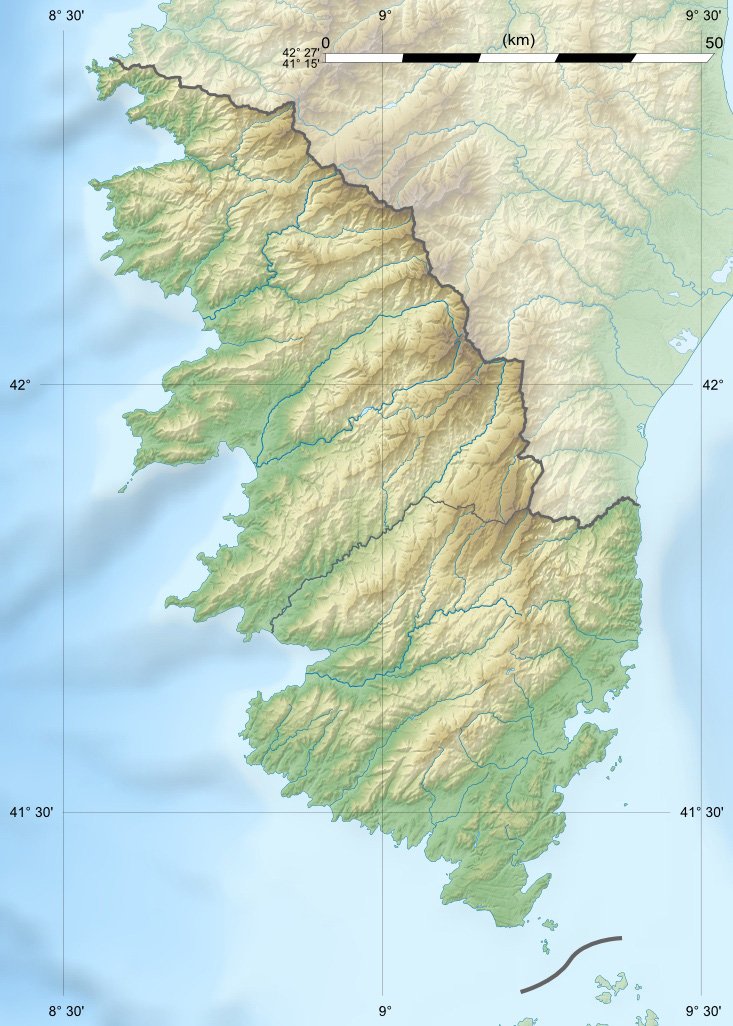
Map of Corse-du-Sud

The department was formed on 1 January 1976, when the single department of Corsica was divided into Haute-Corse and Corse-du-Sud. Its boundaries corresponded to the former department of Liamone, which existed from 1793 to 1811.

On 6 February 1998, Corse-du-Sud's prefect Claude Érignac was assassinated in Ajaccio. The Corsican nationalist Yvan Colonna was eventually convicted of the crime.

On 6 July 2003 a referendum rejected increased autonomy by a small majority, with 50.98 percent voting against and 49.02 percent for. This was a major setback for the French Minister of the Interior, Nicolas Sarkozy, who had hoped to use Corsica as the first step in his decentralization programme.

On 1 January 2018, Corse-du-Sud's administrative powers were partly ceded to the new territorial collectivity of Corsica.

== Geography ==
The department is surrounded on three sides by the Mediterranean Sea and on the north by the department of Haute-Corse. The entire island of Corsica is mountainous with many beautiful beaches.

=== Principal towns ===
The most populous commune is Ajaccio, the prefecture. As of 2023, the 5 most populous communes are:

Commune	Population (2023)
Ajaccio	76,320
Porto-Vecchio	11,198
Bastelicaccia	4,411
Propriano	3,996
Grosseto-Prugna	3,900

== Demographics ==
The people living in Corse-du-Sud are called Suttanacci.

Historical population
Year	Pop.	±% p.a.
1968	89,566	—
1975	100,278	+1.63%
1982	108,604	+1.15%
1990	118,808	+1.13%
1999	118,593	−0.02%
2007	139,362	+2.04%
2012	145,429	+0.86%
2017	157,249	+1.58%
2023	168,306	+1.14%
Source: INSEE

According to an INSEE study, in the period 2021-2022 9.1% of the population were immigrants and 13.8% were descendants of immigrants (at least one parent).

== Politics ==
The current prefect of Corse-du-Sud (and also prefect of the collectivity of Corsica) is Amaury de Saint-Quentin, who took office on 7 March 2022.

=== Current National Assembly representatives ===
Constituency	Member	Party
Corse-du-Sud's 1st constituency	Laurent Marcangeli	Horizons
Corse-du-Sud's 2nd constituency	Paul-André Colombani	Party of the Corsican Nation

== Tourism ==
The former department enjoys the mild and warm climate of Mediterranean Islands and therefore attracts tourists. A major tourist attraction is the city of Bonifacio, part of which is built upon a cliff. The interior mountains are also notable, particularly the Aiguilles de Bavella, a group of needle-like rock formations.

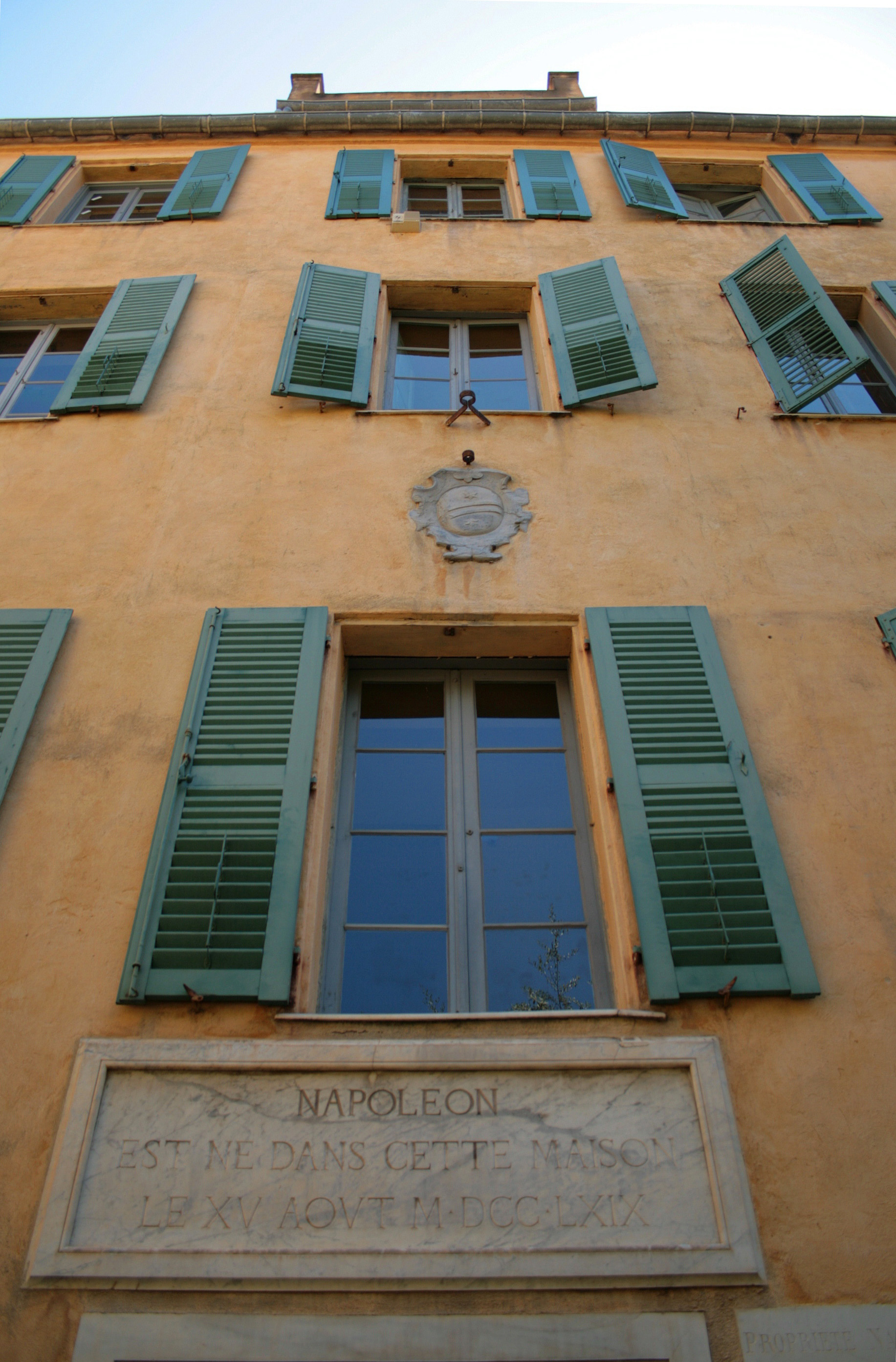
Napoleon's birth house in Ajaccio

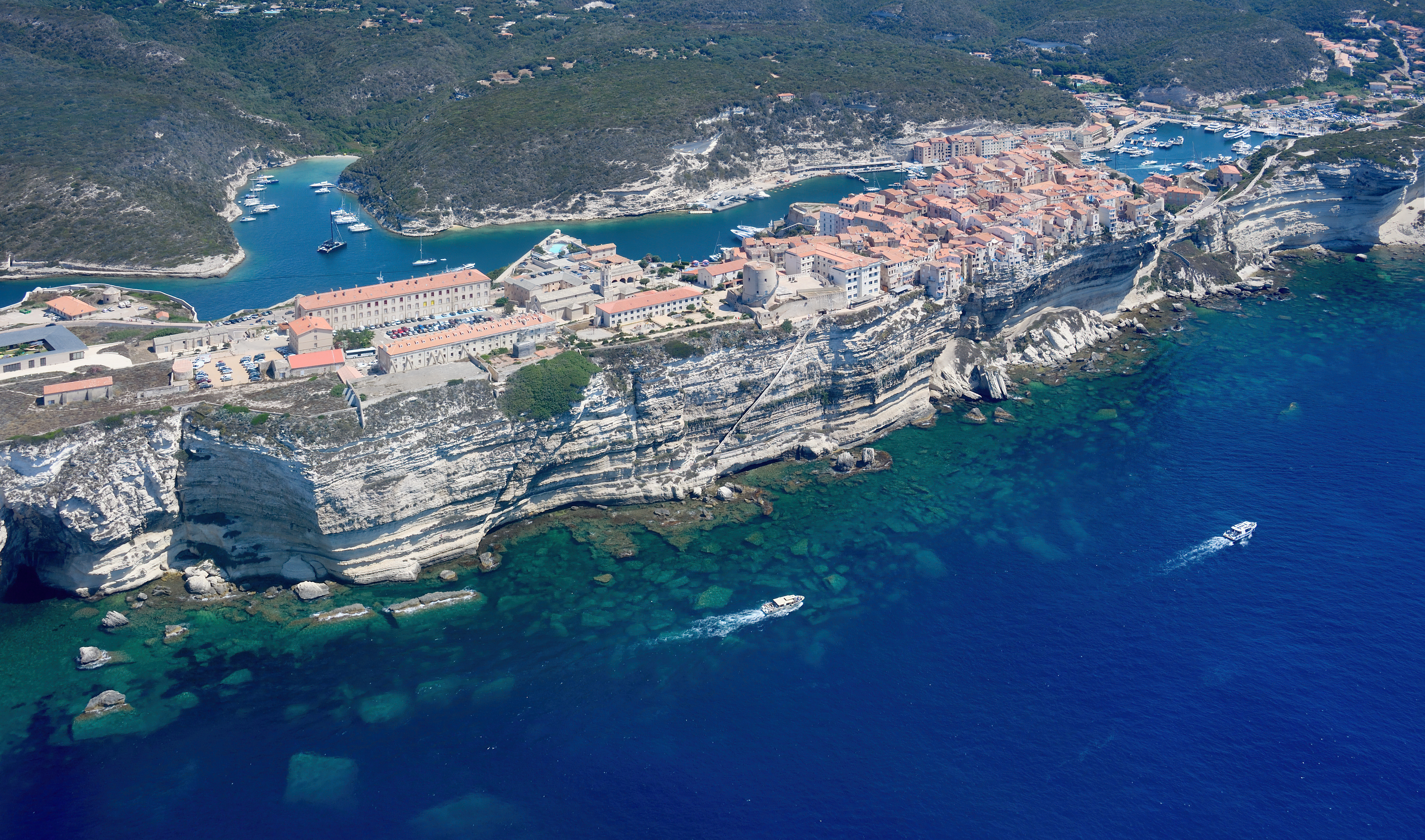
Bonifacio

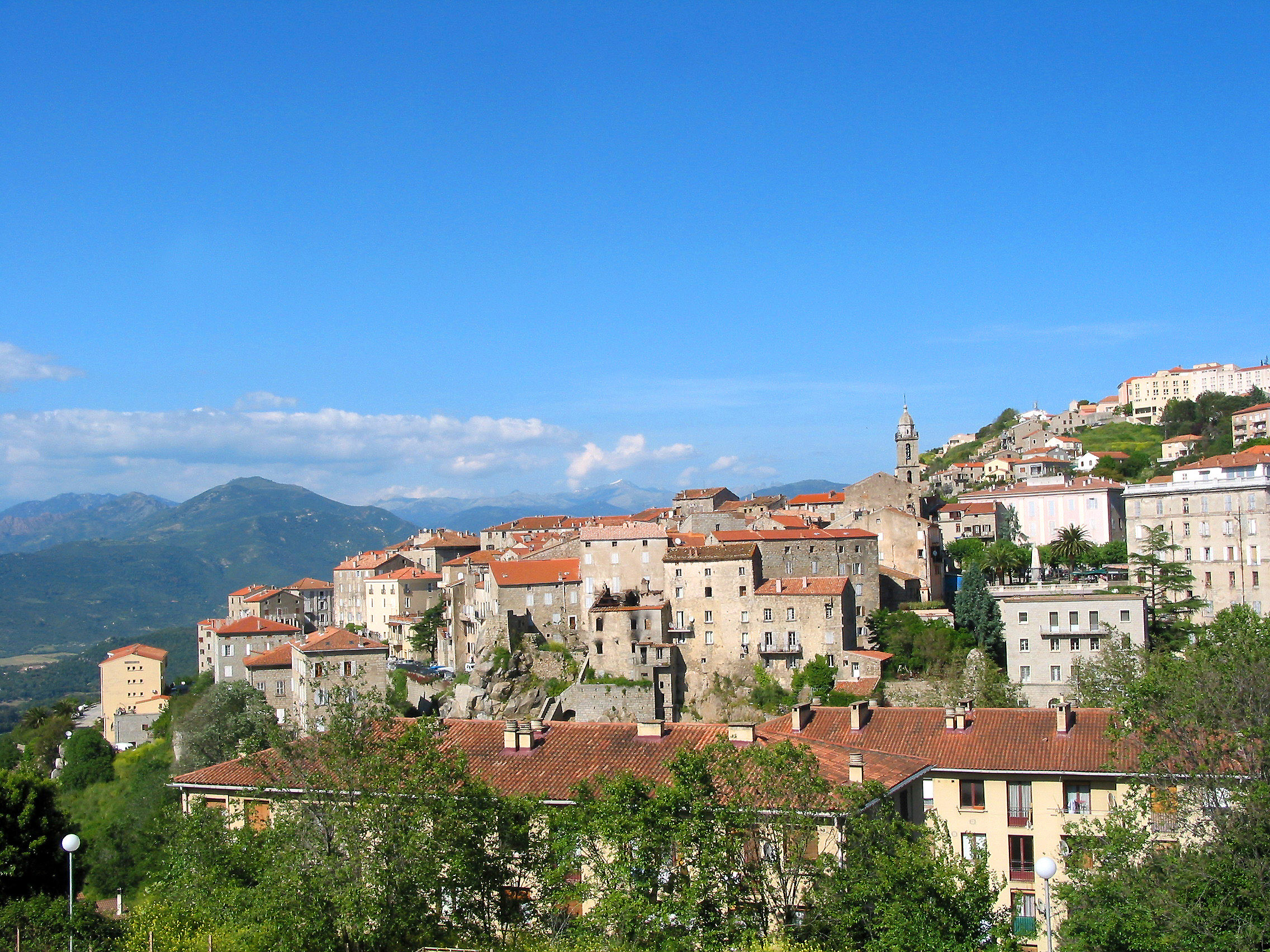
Sartène

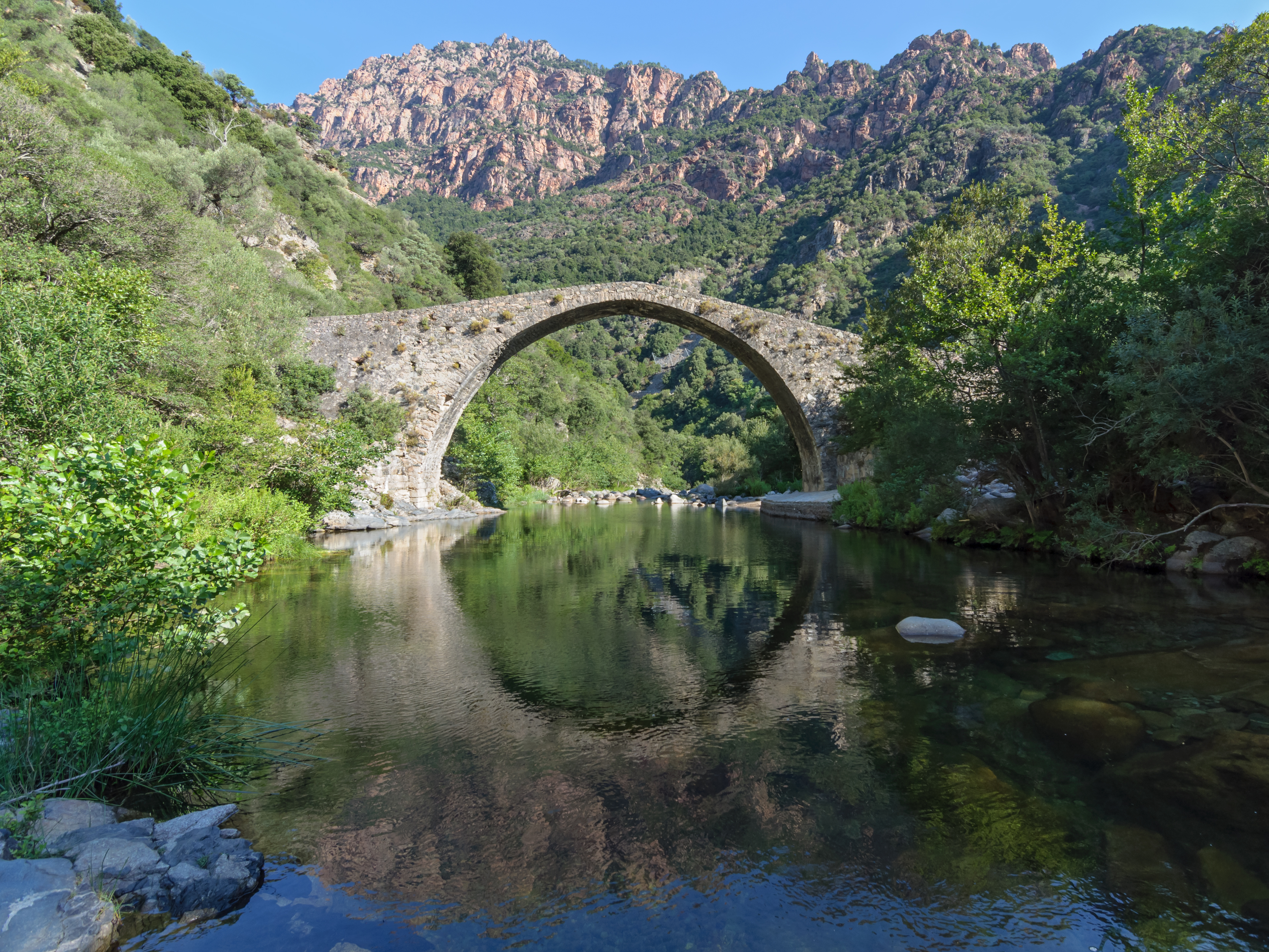
Stone bridge near Ota

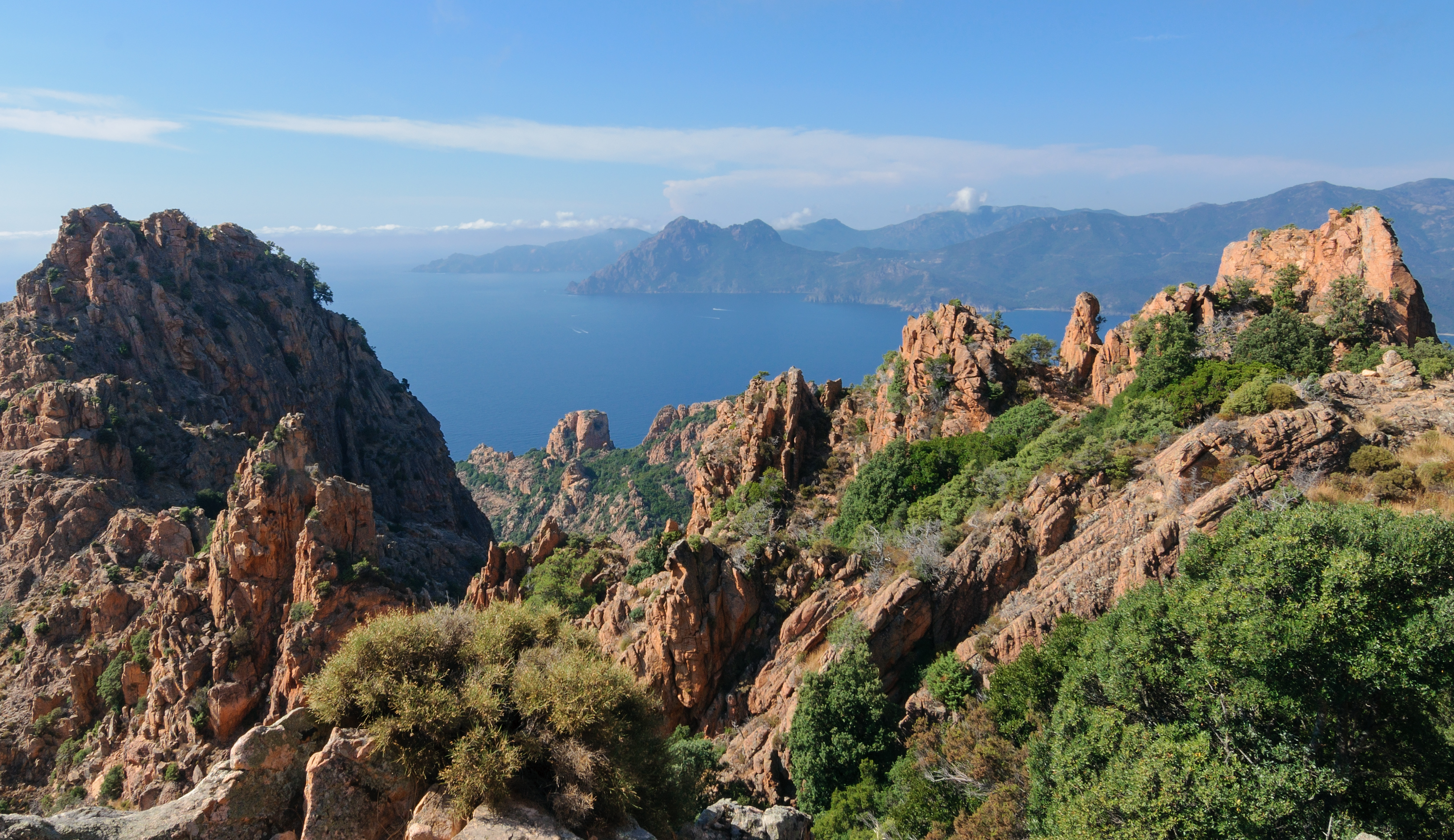
Calanques of Piana

== See also ==
- Cantons of the Corse-du-Sud department
- Communes of the Corse-du-Sud department
- Arrondissements of the Corse-du-Sud department
- List of historical monuments in South Corsica
