= Tokyo Stylez =

American hairstylist and wigmaker

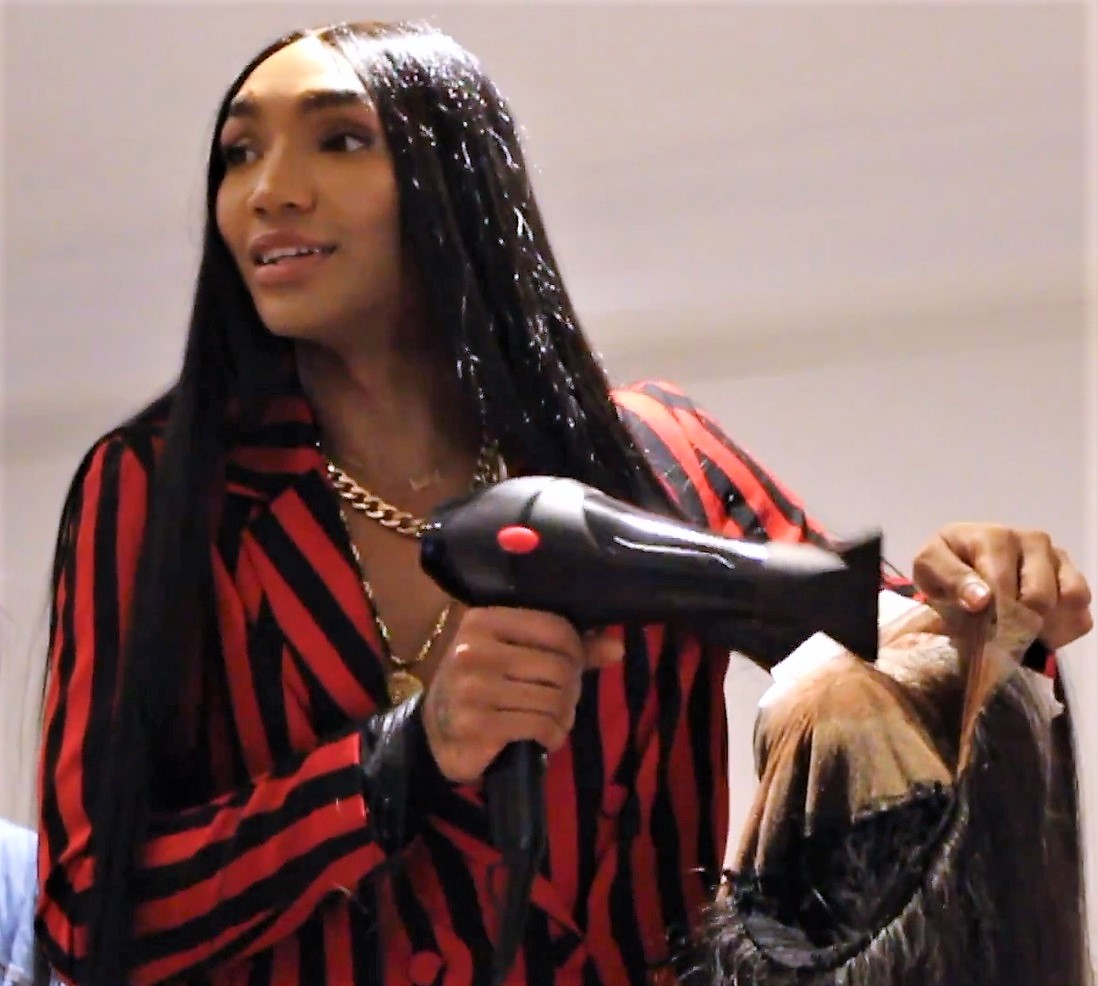
- Stylez at Hair Expo 2017
- Born: December 15, 1989 (age 36); Omaha, Nebraska, U.S.
- Other name: Mia Jackson
- Occupations: Hairdresser, wigmaker, entrepreneur

Mia Jackson (born December 15, 1989), known professionally as Tokyo Stylez, is a hairstylist and wigmaker originally from Omaha, Nebraska. She is perhaps best-known for her appearances on E!'s Keeping up with the Kardashians and Life of Kylie (2017), where she was featured as Kylie Jenner's personal hairstylist—a client and friend whom Stylez has stated to have crafted over 100 wigs and hairpieces for.

Stylez has worked with Kardashian-Jenner's sisters Kendall Jenner and Kim Kardashian, as well as supermodel Naomi Campbell, reality stars and influencers such as Bethenny Frankel, Karrueche Tran, Paris Hilton and TS Madison, and actress Gabrielle Union. She has also styled and provided wigs for numerous musicians, rappers and singers, including Beyoncé, Cardi B, Cher, Doja Cat, Fantasia, Kash Doll, Latto, Lil' Kim, Madonna, Megan Thee Stallion, Nicki Minaj, Rihanna, and Tamar and Toni Braxton, amongst others.

== Early life ==
Mia Jackson, known publicly as Tokyo Stylez, grew up in Omaha, Nebraska. She is of African-American and Native American heritage. Stylez's mother was incarcerated for part of her childhood, at a time when she was still living with her father and younger sister; she began to help by styling her younger sister's hair before school each day. By the age of 15, she had gained enough experience that she was being paid to style hair around the neighborhood, and was in-demand from fellow high school students, both boys and girls, as well as family friends and extended family members. Stylez said that upon her mother's release from prison, it was a pleasant surprise to show off her newfound success.

== Career ==
Tokyo got her start by specializing in sew-in hair extensions but eventually moved into making wigs. Her first celebrity client was Tamar Braxton, however, it was not long until she began making wigs for Kylie Jenner, who found her on Instagram, then her career began to grow rapidly. Tokyo has collaborated with makeup artist and beauty-influencer Hrush Achemyan and hairstylist Jen Atkin.

Tokyo gained popularity as a wigmaker through designing wigs for Kylie Jenner and other celebrities. She said that she had made over 100 wigs for Jenner, and that she could make four to five wigs in one day. Before her initial success, Tokyo made a custom wig for a high school student and friend suffering from cancer after she had contacted Tokyo inquiring about a wig for her prom; Tokyo and her team made and styled a wig for her. Tokyo subsequently began making wigs for another friend's cancer charity; after many inquiries about purchasing the wigs, she eventually began making them for her own clients. Tokyo only uses real, human hair when making her wigs, and tries on nearly every oneshe makes to ensure its comfort and wearability. She has made wigs costing about US$3,000 for various celebrities, models and high-profile clients.

In 2019, Tokyo was to open a wig boutique in Los Angeles, eventually intending to launch her own international hairstyling company.

== Personal life ==
In November 2019, Tokyo began the transition from male to female, documenting the process on Instagram.

Tokyo had a boyfriend, Chris Aaron, who was also her business partner and manager.

== Filmography ==
Television:

Year	Show	Role	Notes	Network
2017	Life of Kylie	Herself	4 episodes	E!
2020	Queen of Stylez	Herself	8 episodes	We TV
2024	Wiggin’ Out With Tokyo Stylez	Herself	-	We TV
