= Hranush =

Hranush (Armenian: Հրանուշ) or Hrush (short version) is an Armenian feminine given name that may refer to

- Hrush Achemyan (born 1987), born Hranush Alexis Achemyan, Armenian-American make-up artist
- Hranush Arshagyan (1887–1905), Ottoman Armenian poet
- Hranush Hakobyan, Armenian politician, member of National Assembly of Armenia, government minister of Armenian diaspora
- Hranush Kharatyan (born 1952), Armenian ethnographer
