= The Masked Singer (American TV series) season 3 =

Season of television series

The Masked Singer
- Season 3
- Promotional poster for season three, featuring "Banana", "Miss Monster", "Frog", and "Llama"
- Starring: Robin Thicke; Jenny McCarthy Wahlberg; Ken Jeong; Nicole Scherzinger
- Hosted by: Nick Cannon
- No. of contestants: 18
- Winner: Kandi Burruss as "Night Angel"
- Runner-up: Jesse McCartney as "Turtle"
- No. of episodes: 18

Release
- Original network: Fox
- Original release: February 2 – May 20, 2020

Season chronology
- ← Previous; Season 2 Next → Season 4

The third season of the American television series The Masked Singer premiered on Fox on February 2, 2020, as the Super Bowl LIV lead-out program, and concluded on May 20, 2020. The season was won by singer/TV personality Kandi Burruss as "Night Angel", with singer Jesse McCartney finishing second as "Turtle", and rapper Bow Wow placing third as "Frog".

== Production ==
The third season featured 18 new costumes. In addition to creating more mobility within the costumes, Toybina described the season's style focus as "more fashion-forward and modern" compared to the superhero and experimental feel of the first and second seasons. A fan favorite costume from the first season, Monster, was reimagined as a female (Miss Monster) to create a "fun and outgoing" costume that kids would enjoy, while White Tiger was designed to resemble an Egyptian warrior "god of all gods."

The series's production crew had to work out better voice modulation routines as they had found fans of the show were able to remove the modulation and identify the speaking from previous seasons. Further, passionate fans of the show had been able to work out identities of the singers from early clue packages, so more difficult clue packages were created for the celebrities in the season. Filming occurred from December 19, 2019, to February 28, 2020.

== Panelists and host ==
Season 3 panelists and host

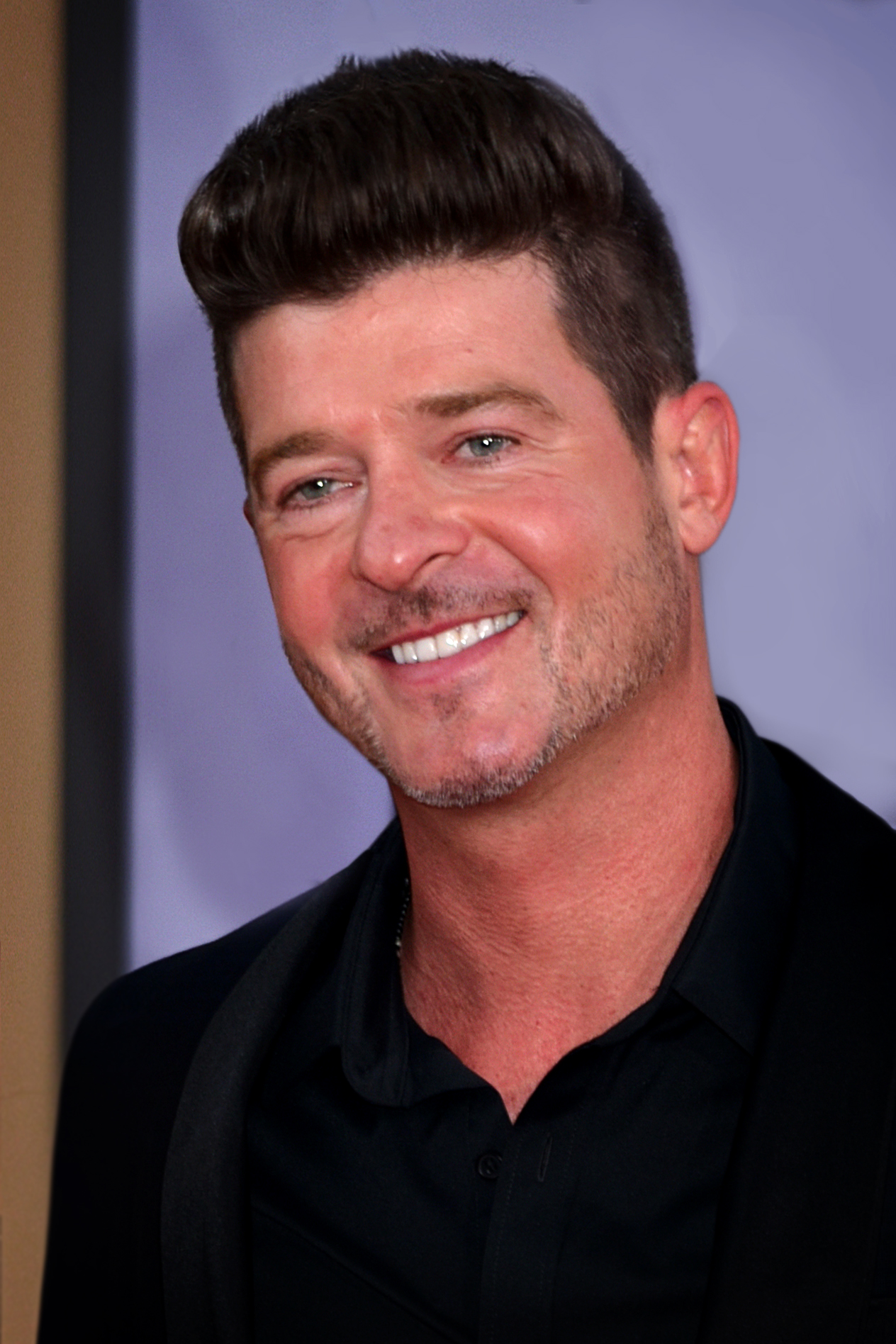
Robin Thicke

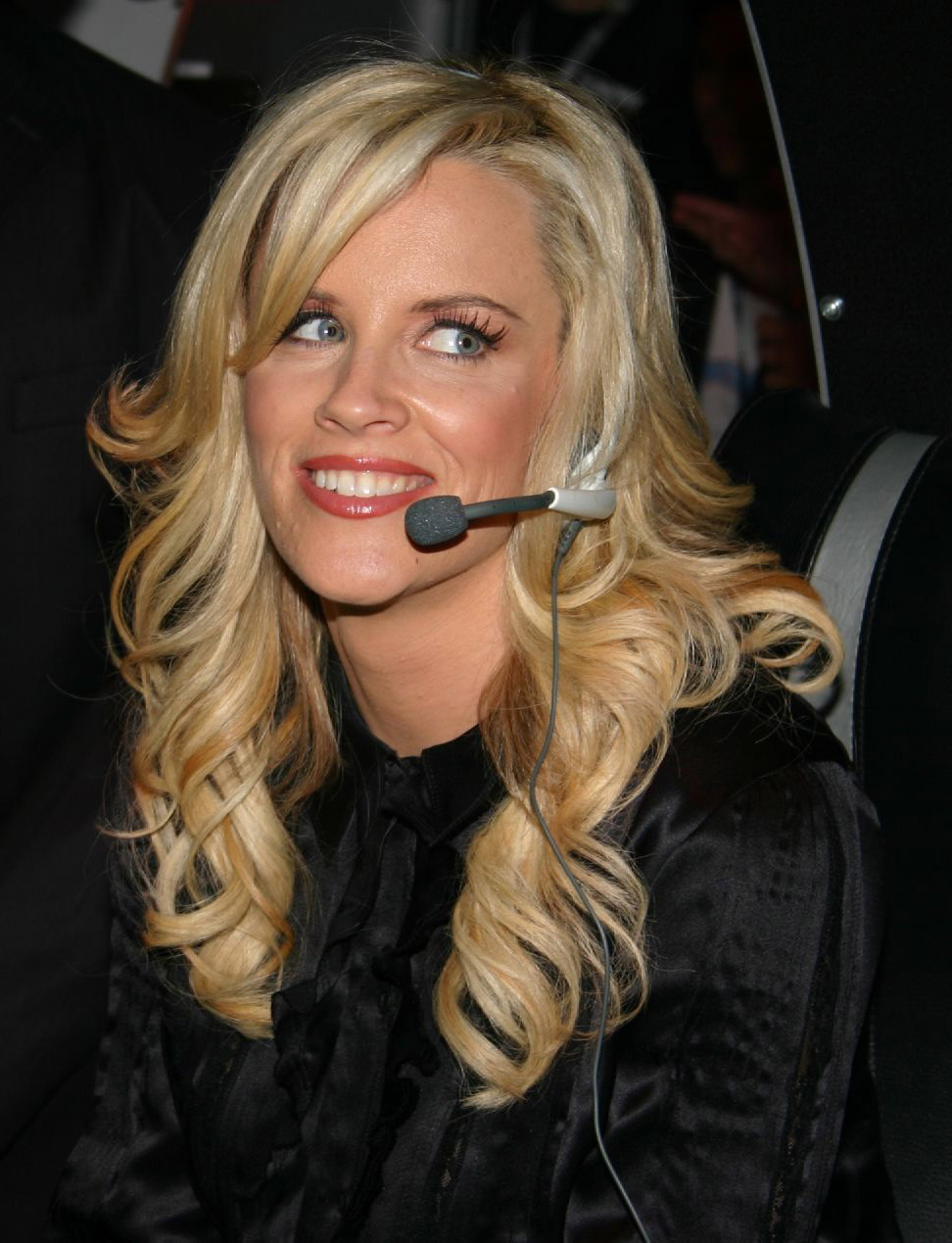
Jenny McCarthy Wahlberg

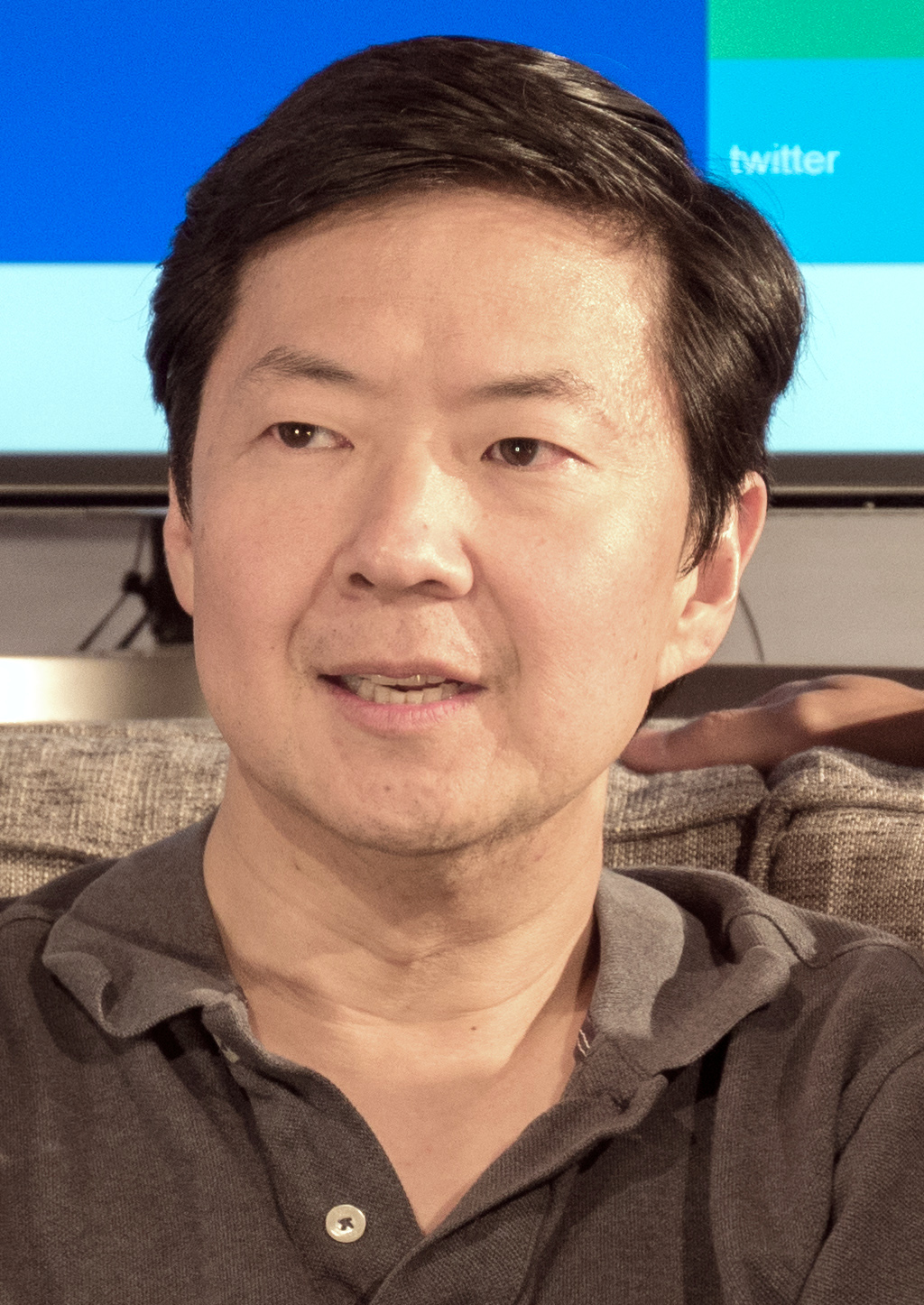
Ken Jeong

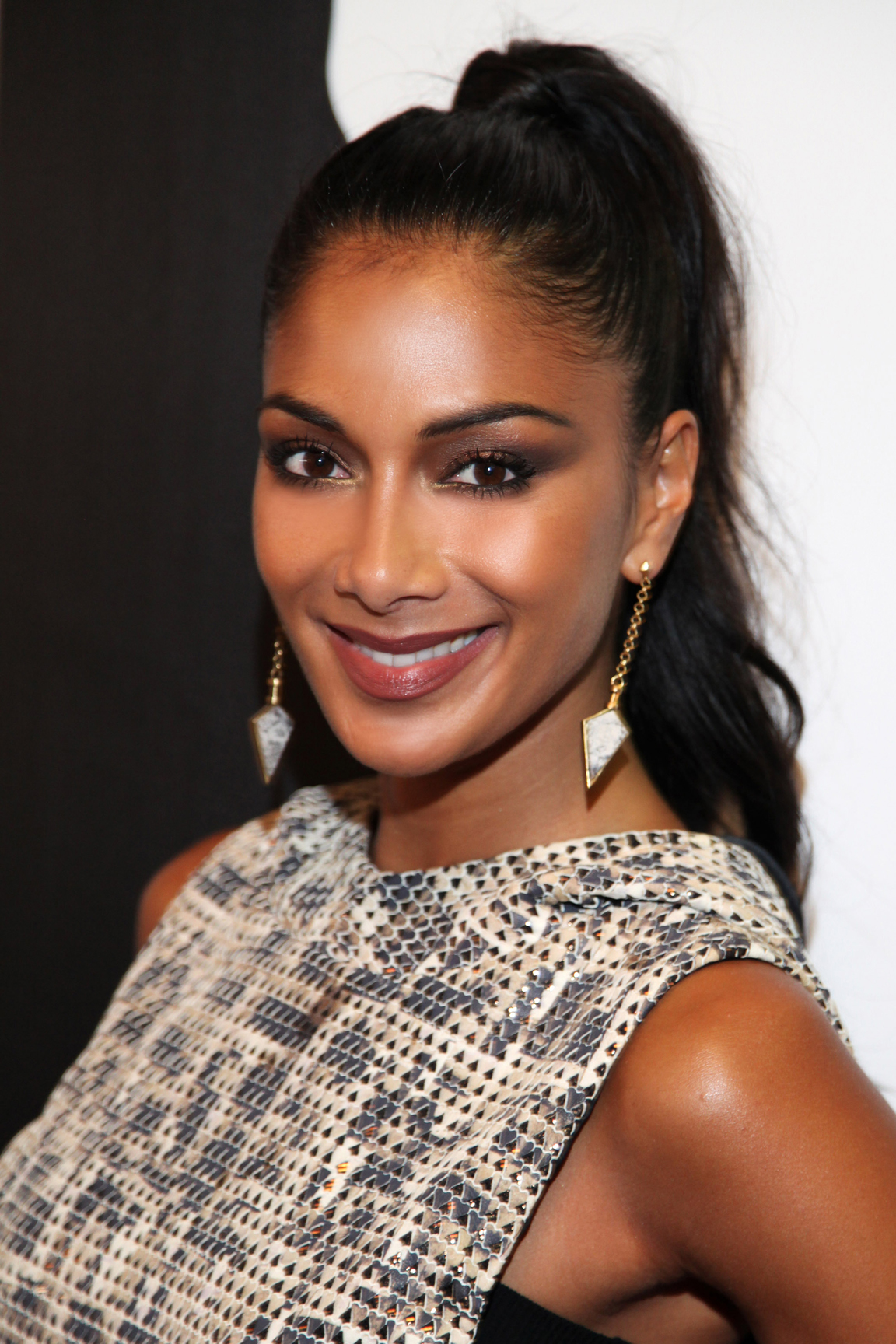
Nicole Scherzinger

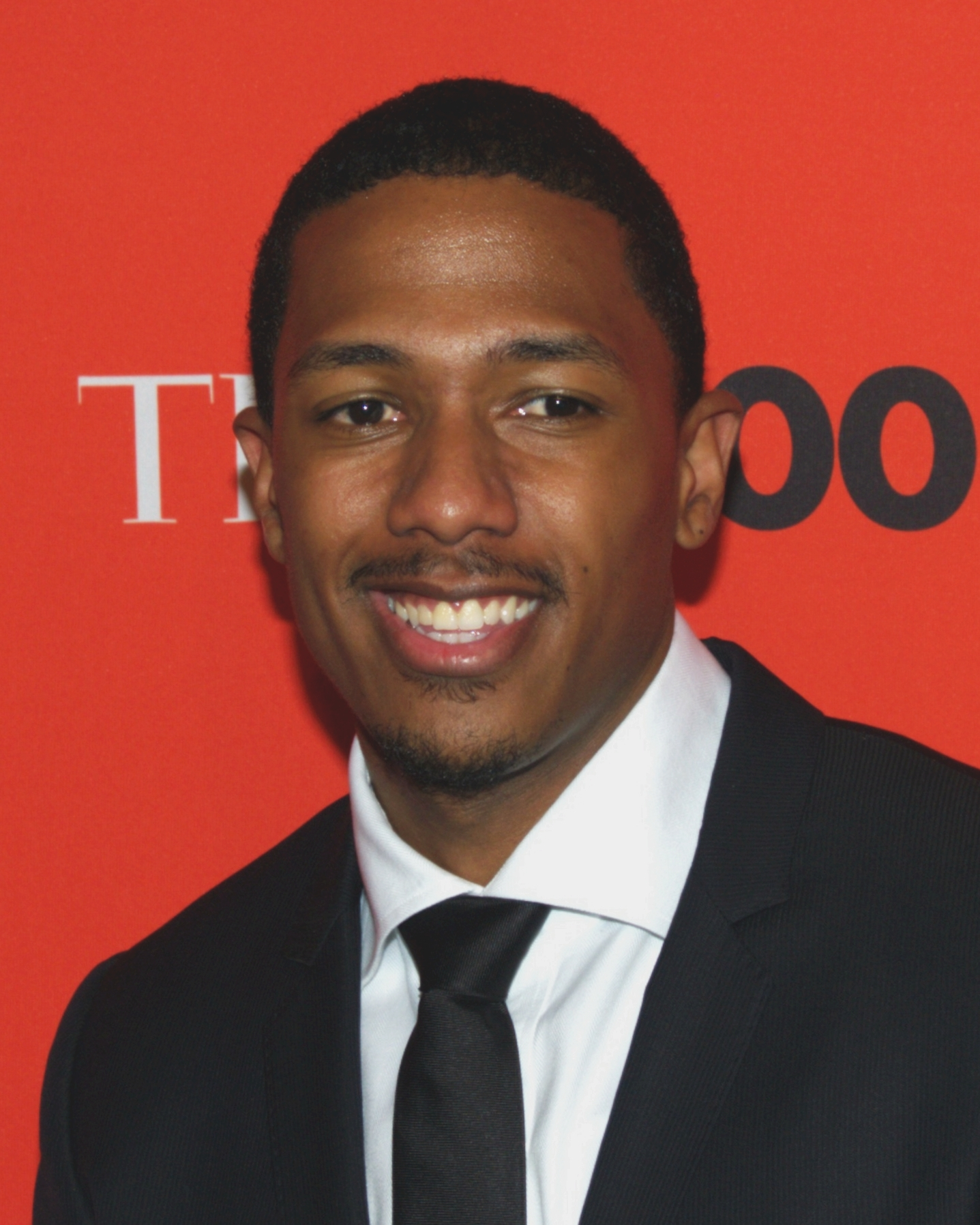
Nick Cannon

Nick Cannon, singer-songwriter Robin Thicke, television personality Jenny McCarthy Wahlberg, actor and comedian Ken Jeong, and recording artist Nicole Scherzinger returned for their third season as host and panelists.

Guest panelists included Jamie Foxx in the first episode, Jason Biggs in the second episode, Leah Remini in the third episode, Gabriel Iglesias in the fifth episode, season one winner, T-Pain, in the sixth episode, Joel McHale in the eighth episode, Will Arnett in the ninth episode, Yvette Nicole Brown in the eleventh episode, Sharon Osbourne in the twelfth episode, Gordon Ramsay in the thirteenth episode, Jeff Dye in the fourteenth episode, and Jay Pharoah in the fifteenth episode.

== Contestants ==
During the season, eighteen contestants competed. The competitors were said to have a combined 69 Grammy nominations, 88 gold records, 11 Super Bowl appearances, three stars on the Hollywood Walk of Fame, hundreds of tattoos, and one title in the Guinness Book of World Records.

The first nine episodes featured the contestants broken into three groups, A, B and C; across three episodes, the remaining contestants in the group performed and the lowest-voted contestant forced to unmask themselves. The tenth episode saw the remaining nine contestants compete. The lowest-voted contestant from each group was put to a final vote to determine the contestant to be unmasked. For the eleventh and twelfth episodes, the eight contestants were split into two groups of four, and within that, two pairings. The lowest-voted contestant of each pairing in the group of four performed in a "smackdown" for a final vote to determine who would be unmasked. For the next three episodes, one of the remaining six contestants was eliminated each week, and the top three contestants competed in the finale episode.

Results
Stage name	Celebrity	Occupation	Episodes															
Stage name	Celebrity	Occupation	1	2	3	4	5	6	7	8	9	10	11	12	13	14	15	17
Stage name	Celebrity	Occupation	Group A			Group B			Group C			10	11	12	13	14	15	17
Night Angel	Kandi Burruss	Singer/TV personality							SAFE	SAFE	SAFE	SAFE	WIN		SAFE	SAFE	SAFE	WINNER
Turtle	Jesse McCartney	Singer	SAFE	SAFE	SAFE							SAFE	WIN		SAFE	SAFE	SAFE	RUNNER-UP
Frog	Bow Wow	Rapper				SAFE	SAFE	SAFE				SAFE		WIN	SAFE	SAFE	SAFE	THIRD
Rhino	Barry Zito	Former MLB pitcher							SAFE	SAFE	SAFE	RISK		WIN	SAFE	SAFE	OUT	
Kitty	Jackie Evancho	Singer				SAFE	SAFE	SAFE				SAFE		RISK	SAFE	OUT		
Astronaut	Hunter Hayes	Singer							SAFE	SAFE	SAFE	SAFE	RISK		OUT			
Banana	Bret Michaels	Singer				SAFE	SAFE	SAFE				RISK		OUT				
Kangaroo	Jordyn Woods	Model/socialite	SAFE	SAFE	SAFE							SAFE	OUT					
White Tiger	Rob Gronkowski	Retired NFL player (Note: Rob Gronkowski was listed as a "retired NFL player" when he was unmasked on the April 1, 2020 show. However, Gronkowski announced he was coming out of retirement on April 21, 2020. The notation in this table reflects his status presented on the show as when the show first aired.)	SAFE	SAFE	SAFE							OUT						
T-Rex	JoJo Siwa	Dancer/singer							SAFE	SAFE	OUT							
Swan	Bella Thorne	Actor							SAFE	OUT								
Bear	Sarah Palin	Politician							OUT									
Taco	Tom Bergeron	TV host				SAFE	SAFE	OUT										
Mouse	Dionne Warwick	Singer				SAFE	OUT											
Elephant	Tony Hawk	Skateboarder				OUT												
Miss Monster	Chaka Khan	Singer	SAFE	SAFE	OUT													
Llama	Drew Carey	Comedian/TV host	SAFE	OUT														
Robot	Lil Wayne	Rapper	OUT															

The masked singer won their face-off and remained in the competition.
The masked singer lost their face-off and was in the bottom two/three, but was not eliminated.
The masked singer was safe from elimination.
The masked singer was eliminated from the competition and unmasked.
The masked singer did not perform.
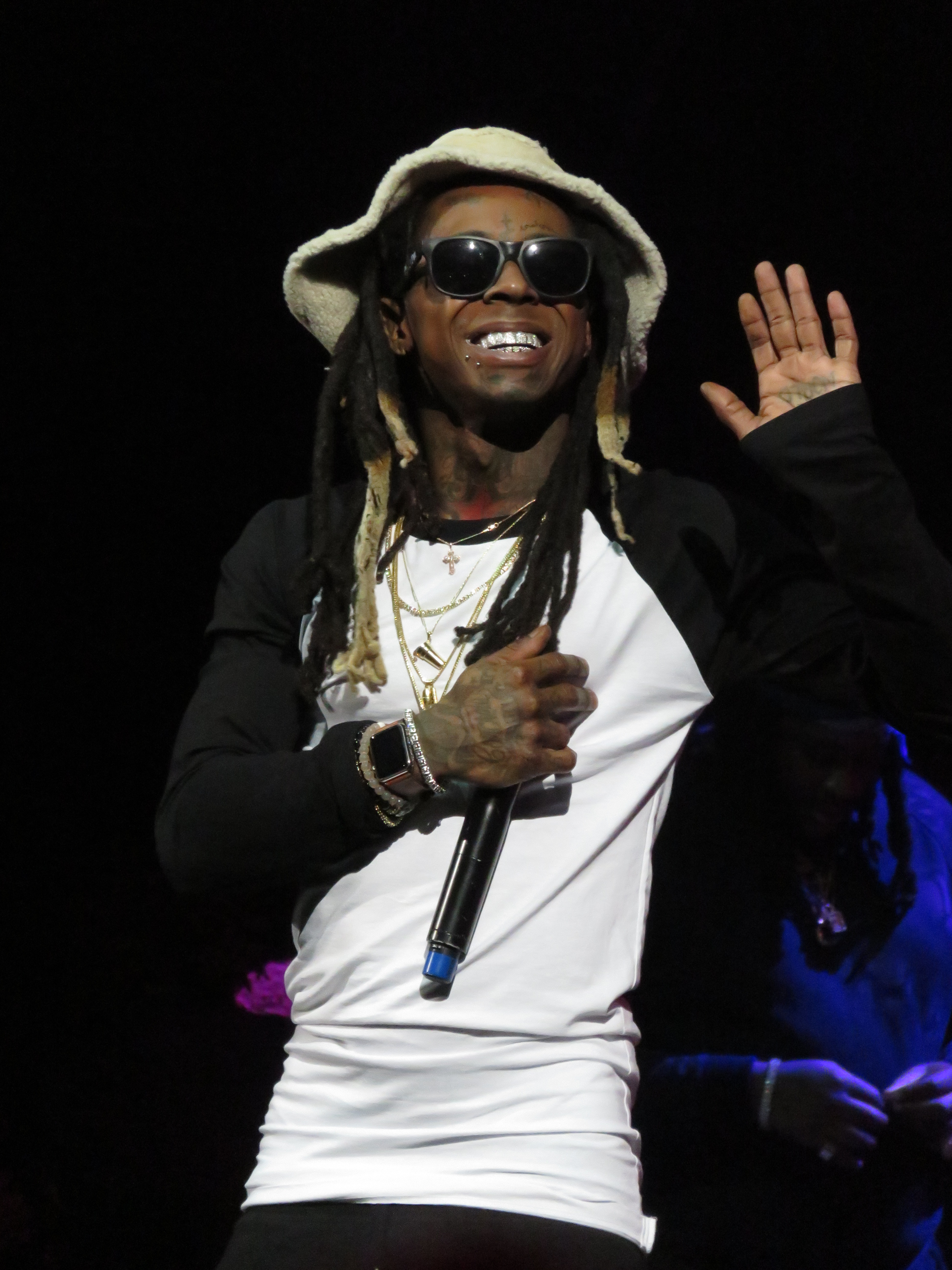
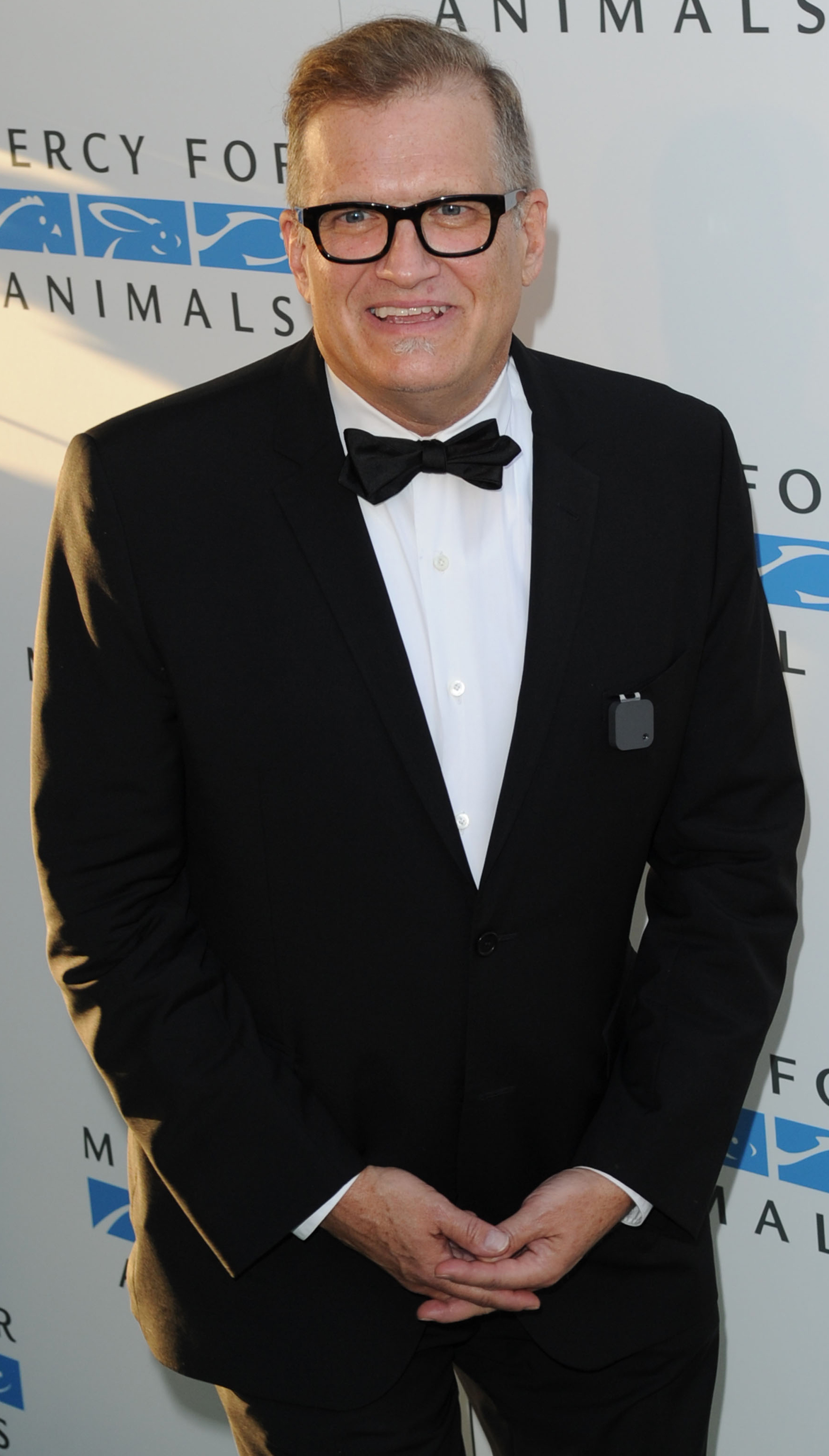
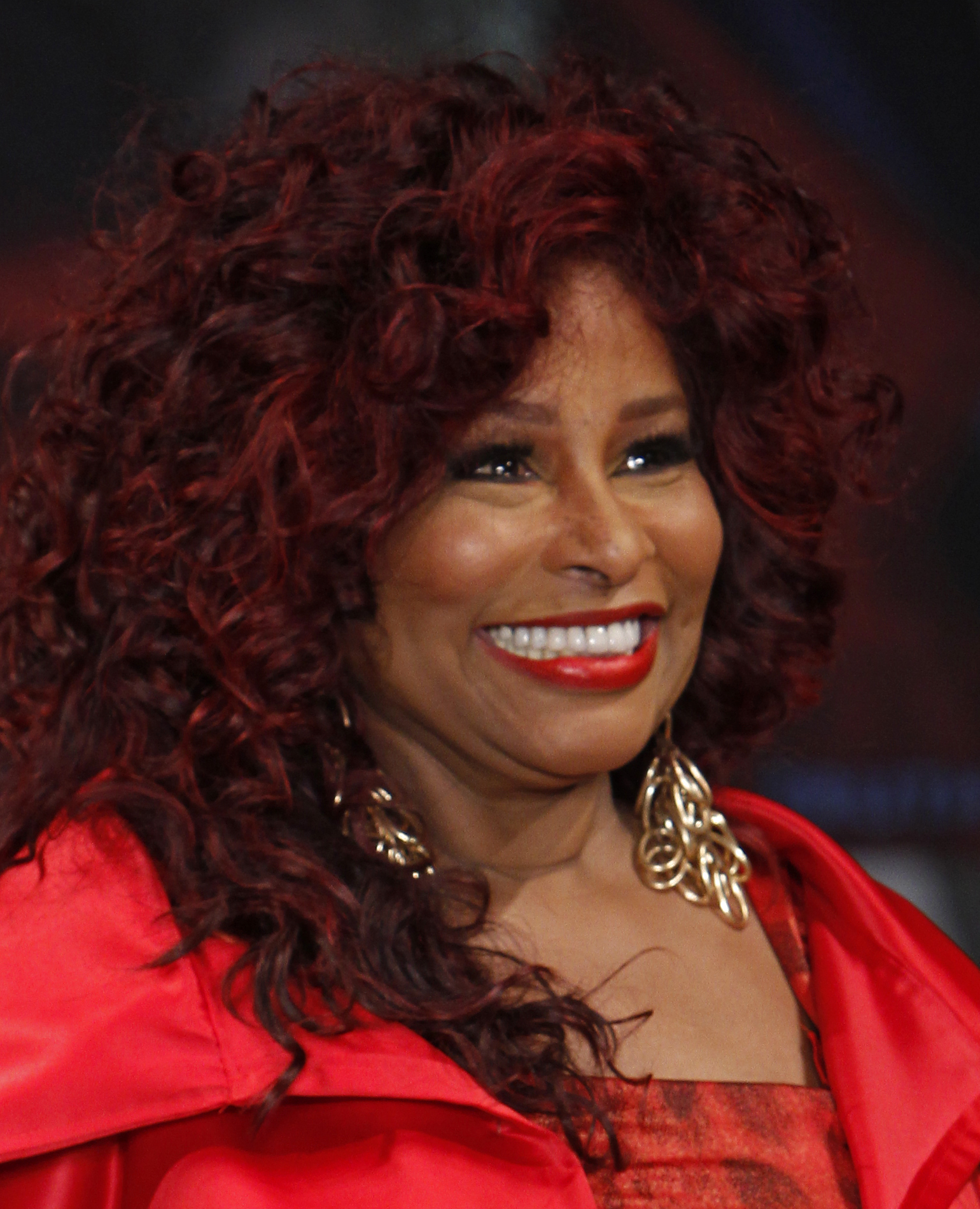
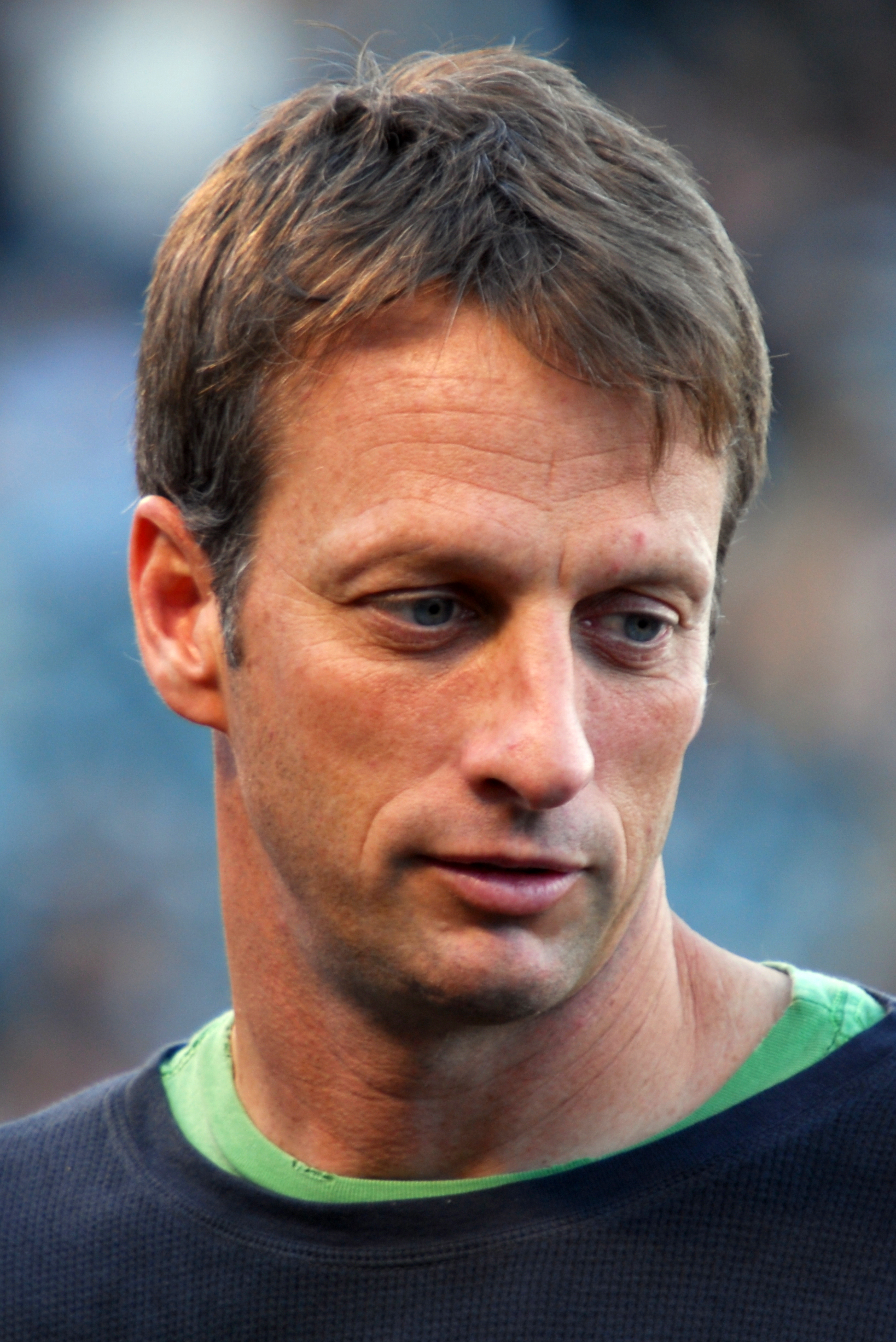
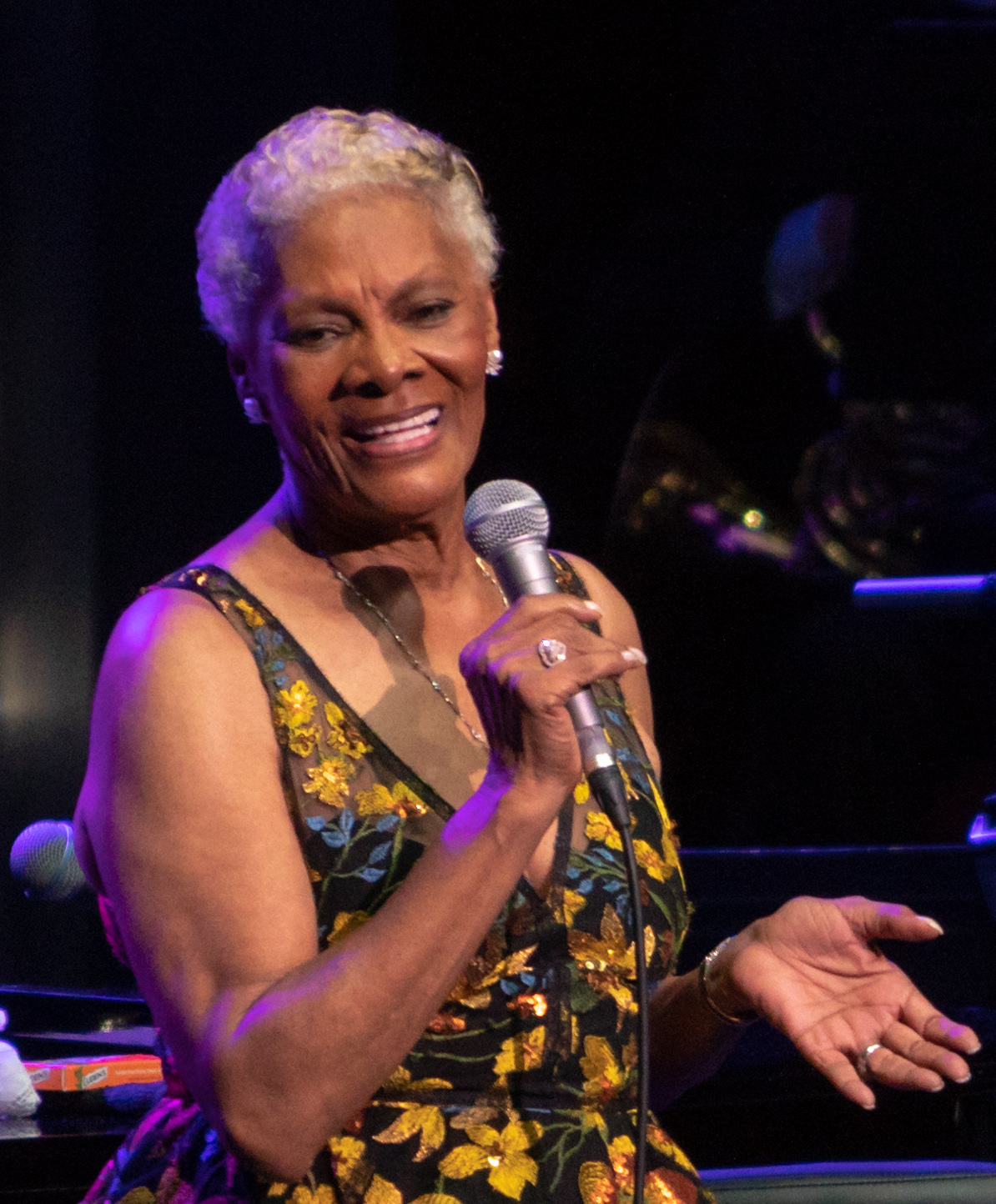
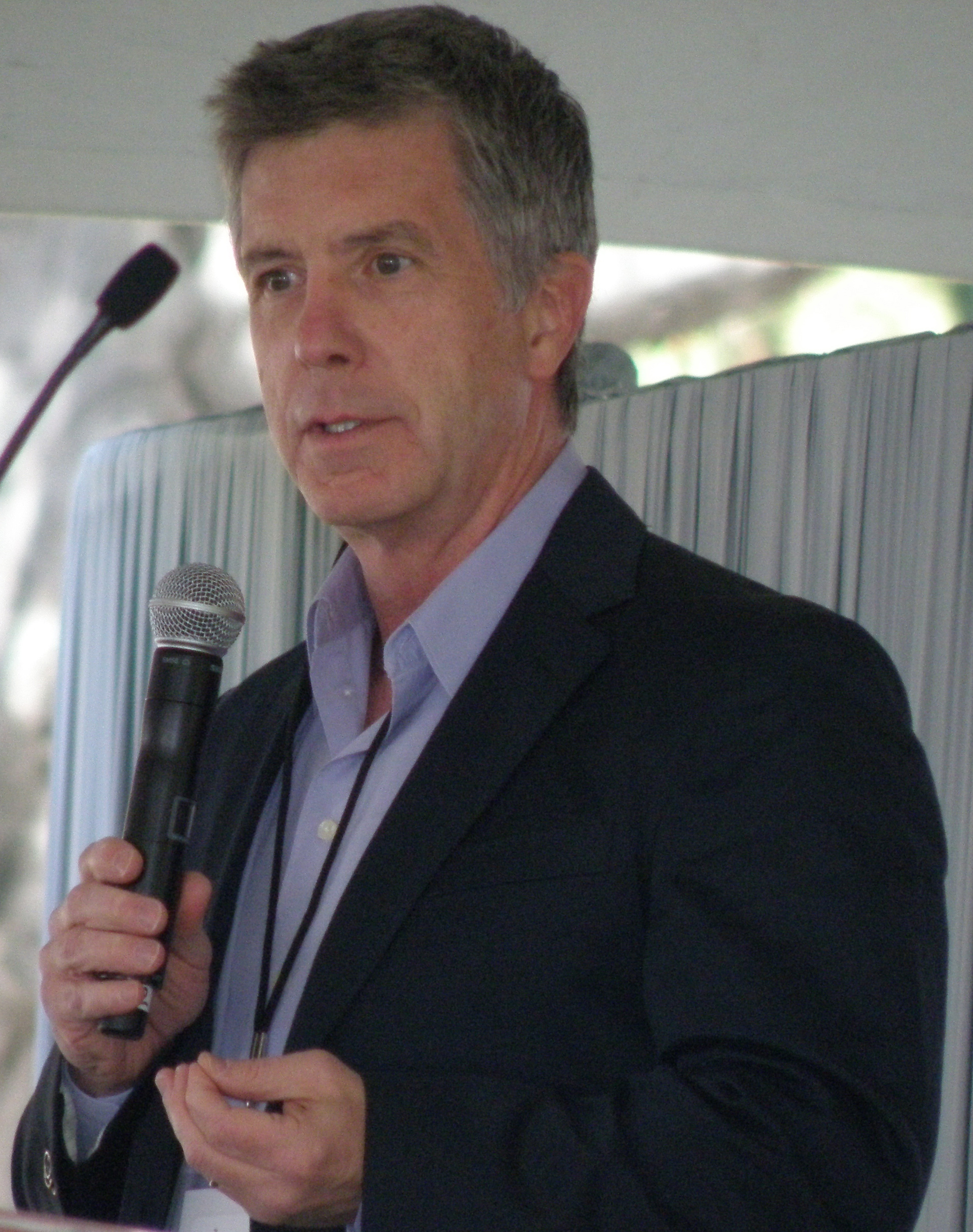
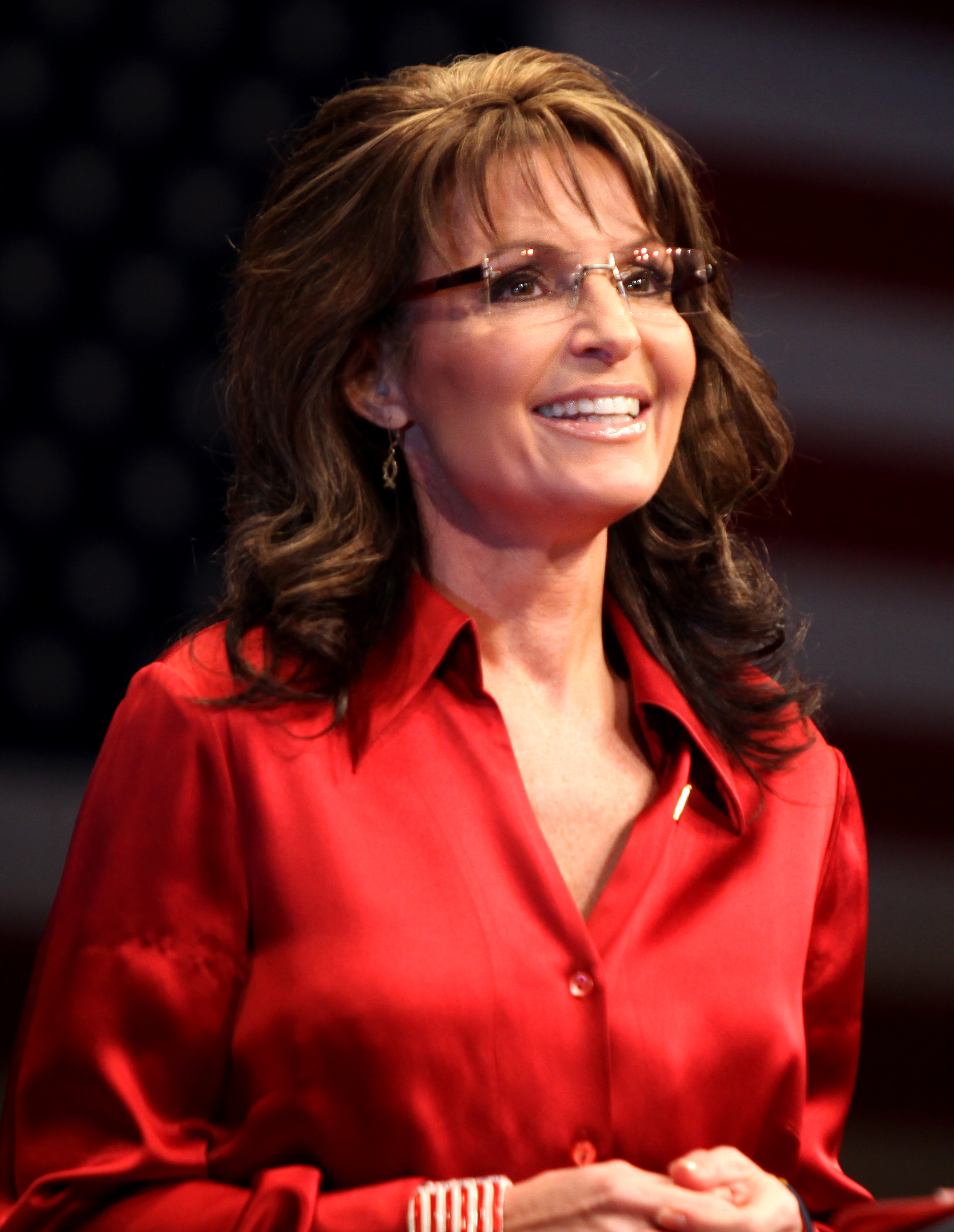
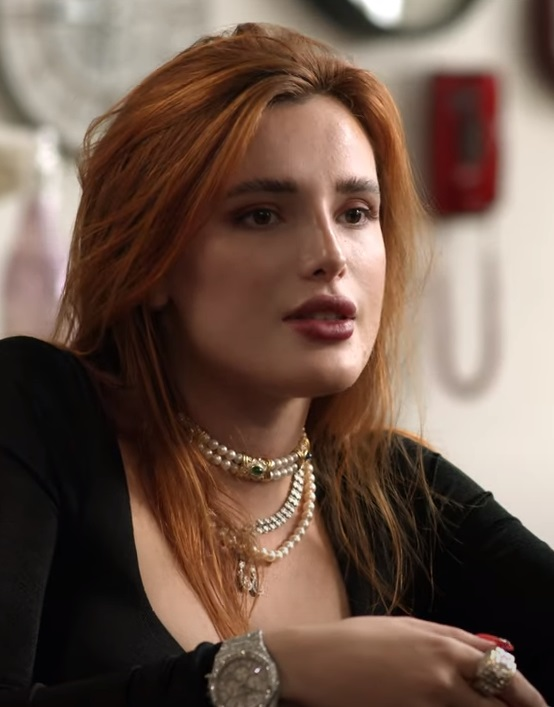
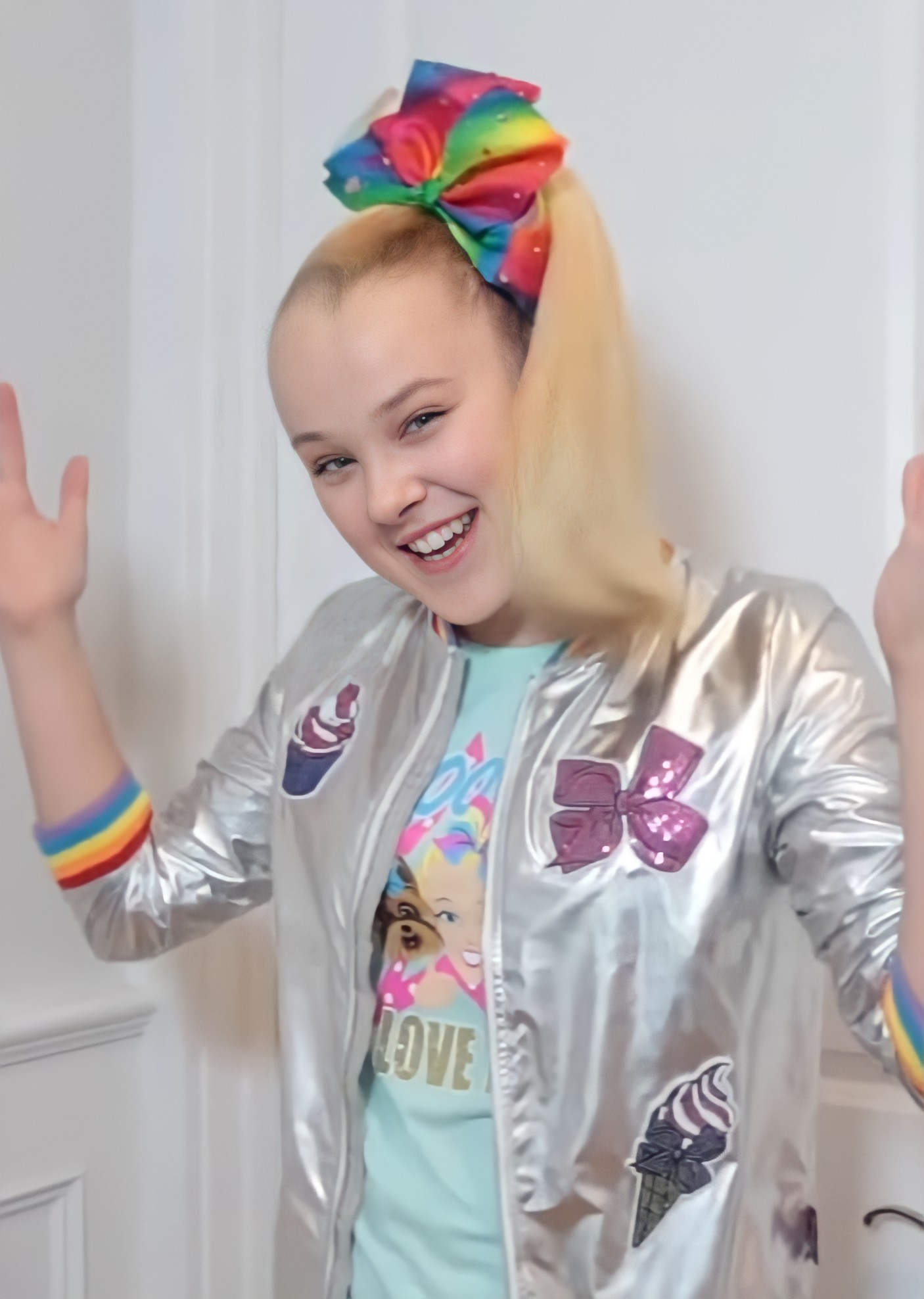
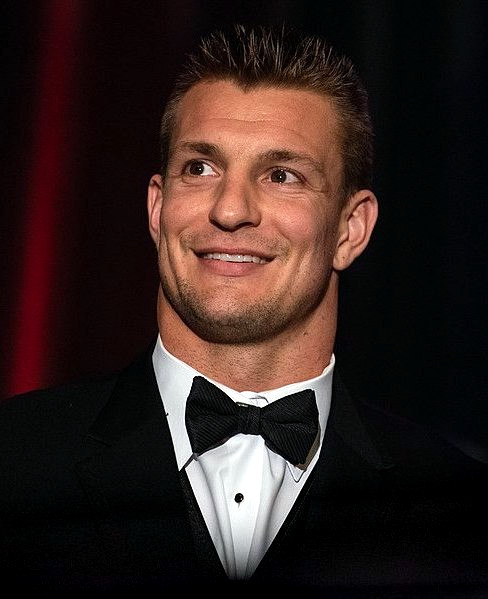
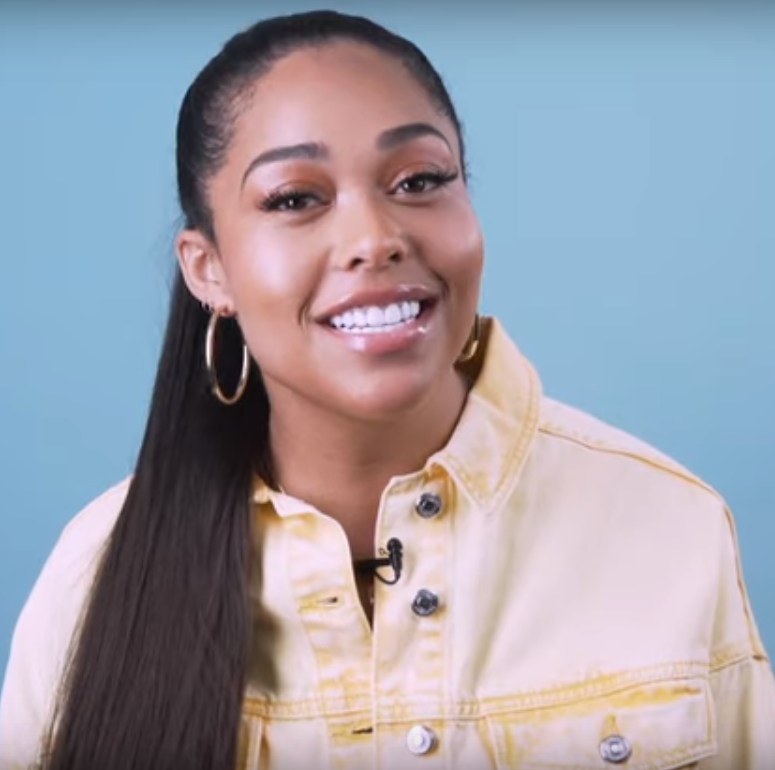
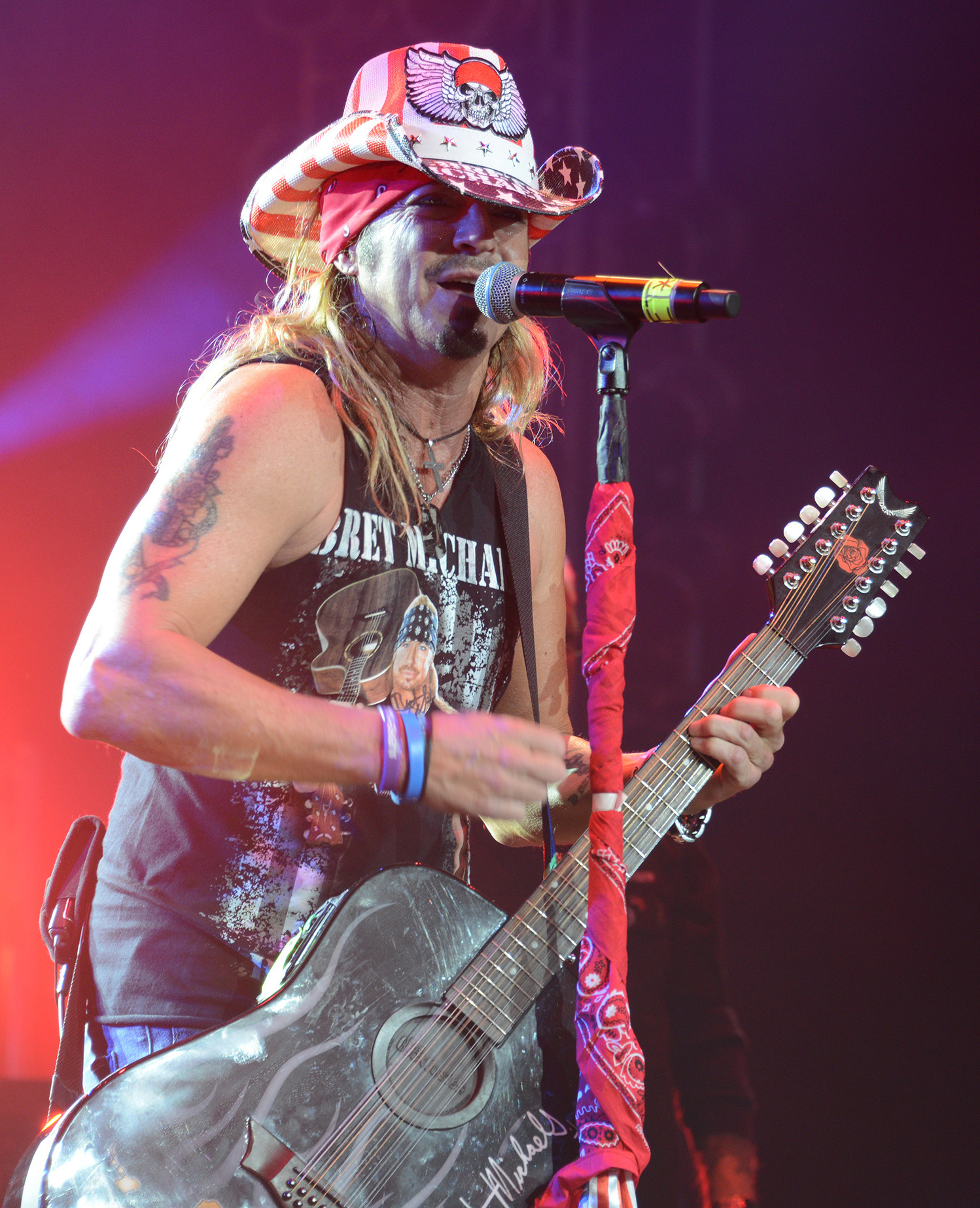
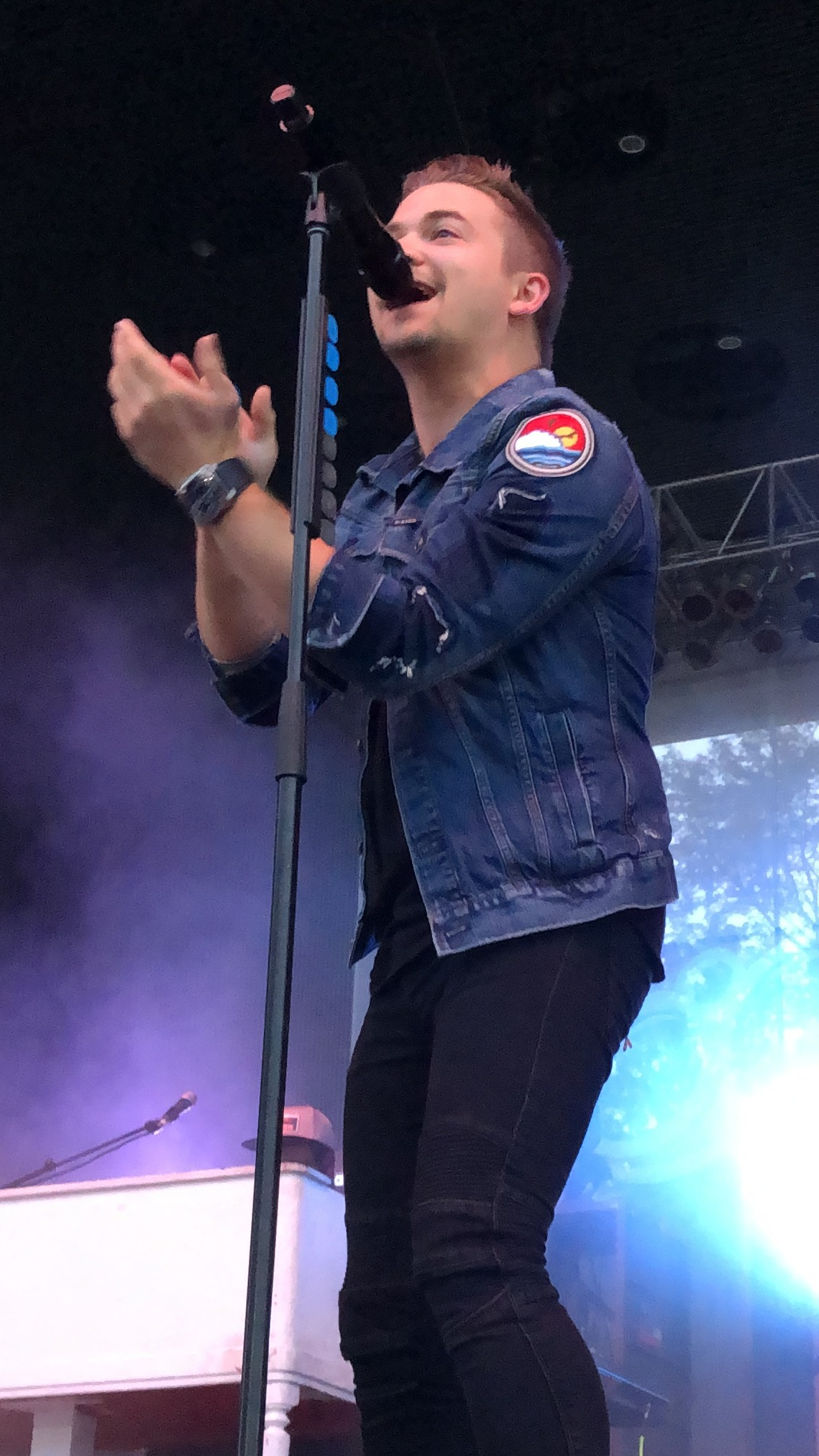
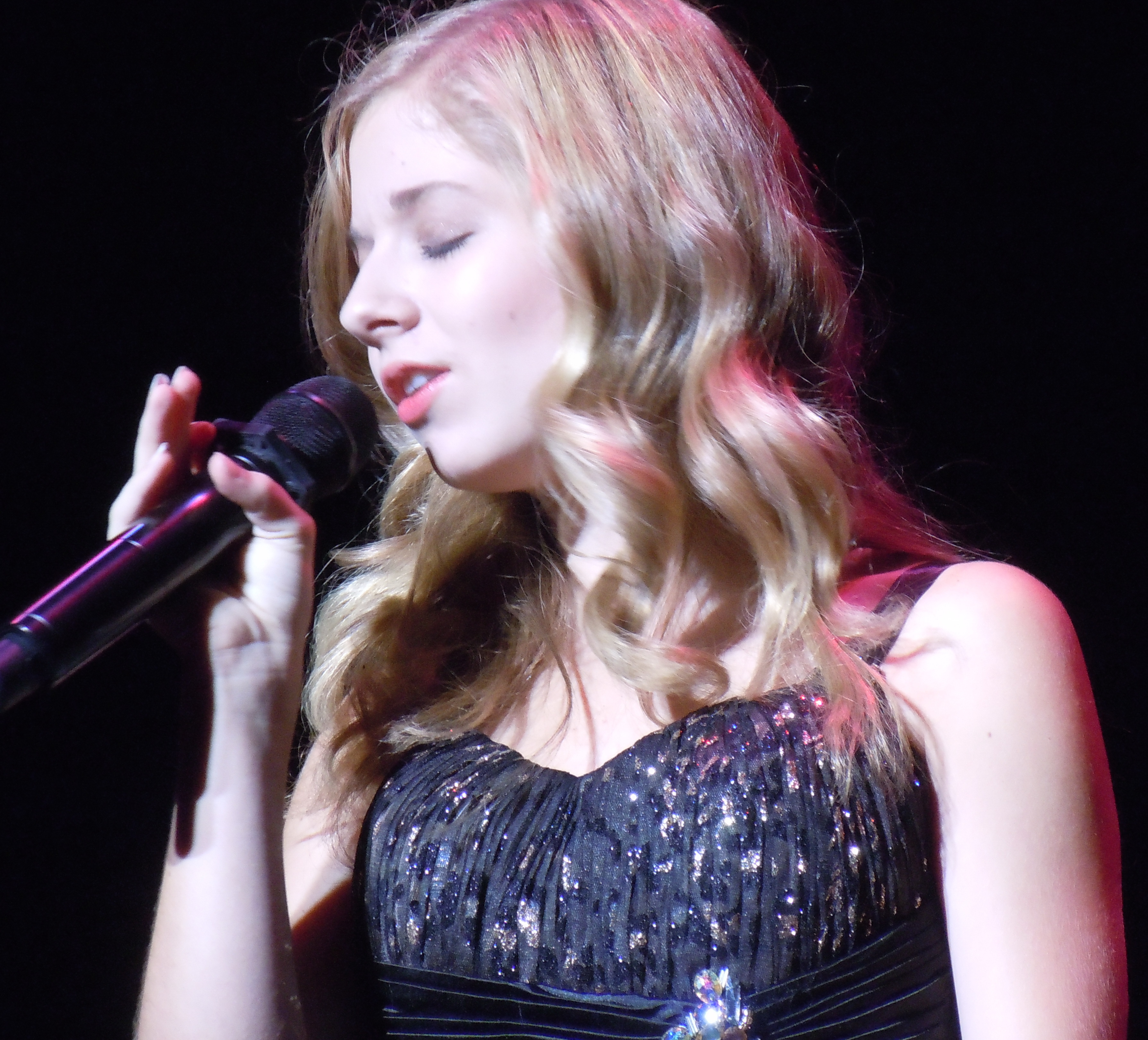
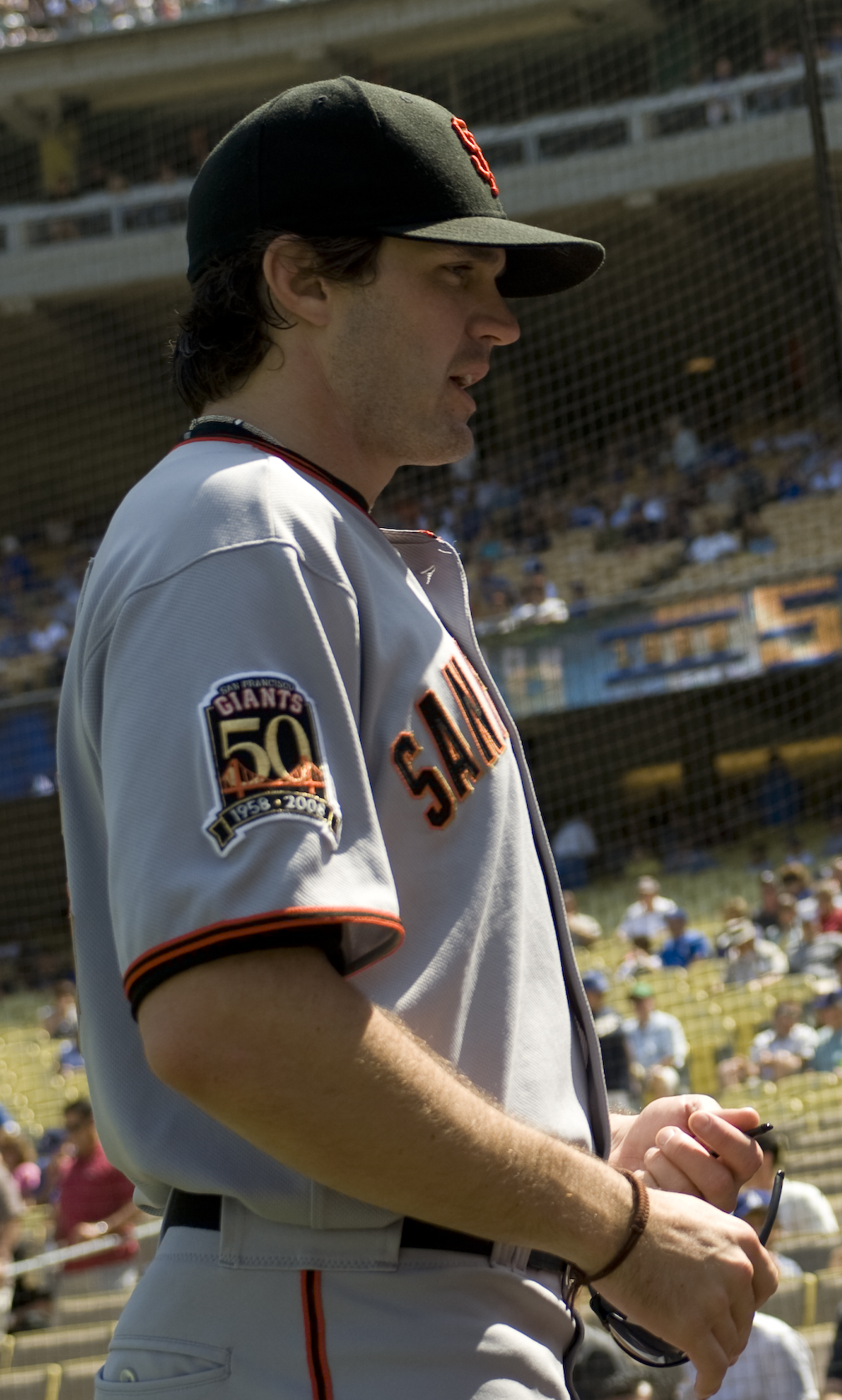
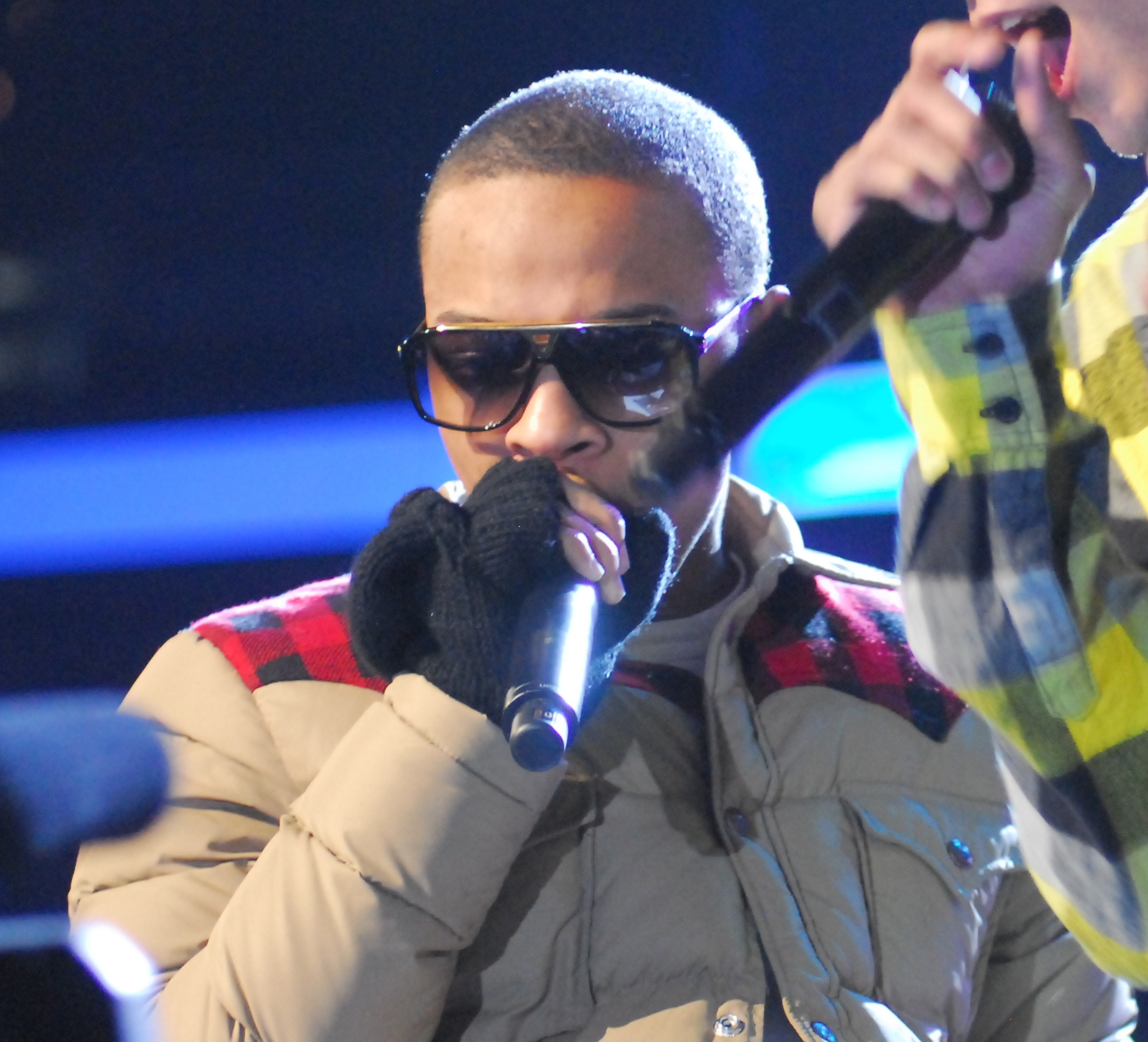
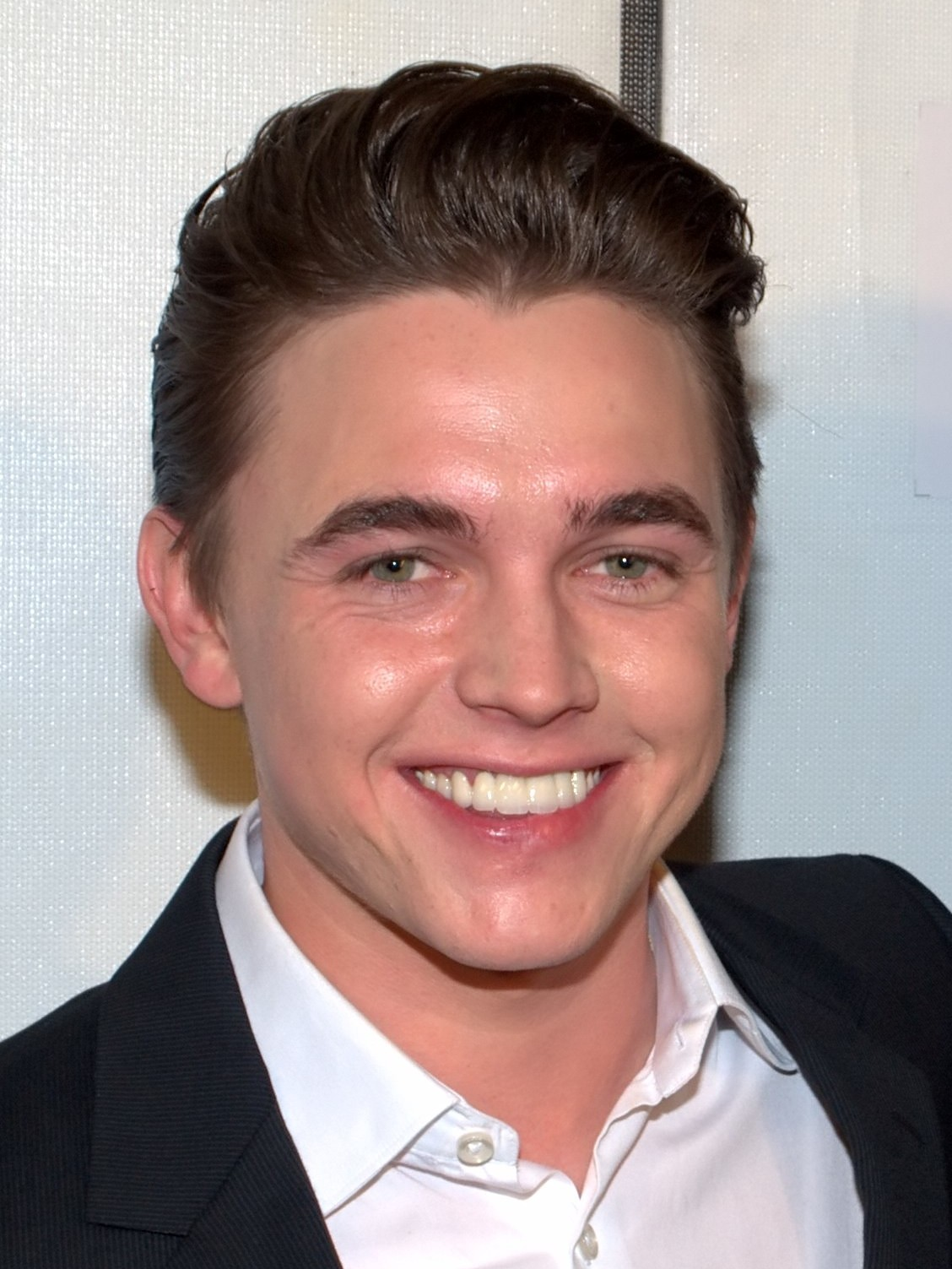
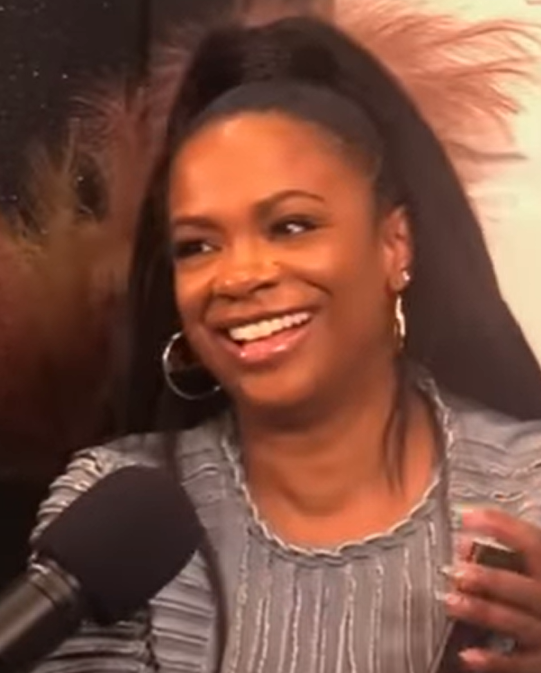
The celebrities who competed in the third season of The Masked Singer, pictured in order of elimination (L–R):
Lil Wayne ("Robot"), Drew Carey ("Llama"), Chaka Khan ("Miss Monster"), Tony Hawk ("Elephant"), Dionne Warwick ("Mouse"), Tom Bergeron ("Taco"), Sarah Palin ("Bear"), Bella Thorne ("Swan"), JoJo Siwa ("T-Rex"), Rob Gronkowski ("White Tiger"), Jordyn Woods ("Kangaroo"), Bret Michaels ("Banana"), Hunter Hayes ("Astronaut"), Jackie Evancho ("Kitty"), Barry Zito ("Rhino"), Bow Wow ("Frog"), Jesse McCartney ("Turtle"), and Kandi Burruss ("Night Angel")

== Episodes ==
=== Week 1 (February 2 and 5) ===
Performances on the first episode (Group A Kickoff)
#	Stage name	Song	Identity	Result
1	White Tiger	"Ice Ice Baby" by Vanilla Ice	undisclosed	SAFE
2	Turtle	"Kiss from a Rose" by Seal	undisclosed	SAFE
3	Llama	"She Bangs" by Ricky Martin	undisclosed	SAFE
4	Miss Monster	"Something to Talk About" by Bonnie Raitt	undisclosed	SAFE
5	Robot	"Are You Gonna Go My Way" by Lenny Kravitz	Lil Wayne	OUT
6	Kangaroo	"Dancing On My Own" by Robyn	undisclosed	SAFE

Performances on the second episode (Group A Playoffs)
#	Stage name	Song	Identity	Result
1	Llama	"It's Not Unusual" by Tom Jones	Drew Carey	OUT
2	Miss Monster	"Fancy" by Bobbie Gentry	undisclosed	SAFE
3	White Tiger	"Good Vibrations" by Marky Mark and the Funky Bunch	undisclosed	SAFE
4	Kangaroo	"You Know I'm No Good" by Amy Winehouse	undisclosed	SAFE
5	Turtle	"Say You Won't Let Go" by James Arthur	undisclosed	SAFE

=== Week 2 (February 12) ===
Group number: "Rock and Roll All Nite" by Kiss

Performances on the third episode (Group A Championship)
#	Stage name	Song	Identity	Result
1	Turtle	"There's Nothing Holdin' Me Back" by Shawn Mendes	undisclosed	SAFE
2	Miss Monster	"You Don't Own Me" by Lesley Gore	Chaka Khan	OUT
3	Kangaroo	"Diamonds" by Rihanna	undisclosed	SAFE
4	White Tiger	"We Will Rock You" by Queen	undisclosed	SAFE

=== Week 3 (February 19) ===
Performances on the fourth episode (Group B Kickoff)
#	Stage name	Song	Identity	Result
1	Frog	"U Can't Touch This" by MC Hammer	undisclosed	SAFE
2	Elephant	"Friday I'm In Love" by The Cure	Tony Hawk	OUT
3	Kitty	"Dangerous Woman" by Ariana Grande	undisclosed	SAFE
4	Taco	"Fly Me to the Moon" by Frank Sinatra	undisclosed	SAFE
5	Mouse	"Get Here" by Oleta Adams	undisclosed	SAFE
6	Banana	"A Little Less Conversation" by Elvis Presley	undisclosed	SAFE

=== Week 4 (February 26) ===
Performances on the fifth episode (Group B Playoffs)
#	Stage name	Song	Identity	Result
1	Banana	"Achy Breaky Heart" by Billy Ray Cyrus	undisclosed	SAFE
2	Mouse	"This Will Be (An Everlasting Love)" by Natalie Cole	Dionne Warwick	OUT
3	Frog	"In da Club" by 50 Cent	undisclosed	SAFE
4	Taco	"Bossa Nova Baby" by Elvis Presley	undisclosed	SAFE
5	Kitty	"Mercy" by Brett Young	undisclosed	SAFE

=== Week 5 (March 4) ===
Group number: "Larger than Life" by Backstreet Boys

Performances on the sixth episode (Group B Championships)
#	Stage name	Song	Identity	Result
1	Kitty	"Mama's Broken Heart" by Miranda Lambert	undisclosed	SAFE
2	Taco	"Can't Help Myself" by The Four Tops	Tom Bergeron	OUT
3	Banana	"Lean on Me" by Bill Withers	undisclosed	SAFE
4	Frog	"You Dropped a Bomb on Me" by The Gap Band	undisclosed	SAFE

=== Week 6 (March 11) ===
Performances on the seventh episode (Group C Kickoff)
#	Stage name	Song	Identity	Result
1	Night Angel	"You Give Love a Bad Name" by Bon Jovi	undisclosed	SAFE
2	Bear	"Baby Got Back" by Sir Mix-a-Lot	Sarah Palin	OUT
3	Astronaut	"You Say" by Lauren Daigle	undisclosed	SAFE
4	T-Rex	"So What" by P!nk	undisclosed	SAFE
5	Rhino	"Have a Little Faith in Me" by John Hiatt	undisclosed	SAFE
6	Swan	"Fever" by Peggy Lee	undisclosed	SAFE

=== Week 7 (March 18) ===
Performances on the eighth episode (Group C Playoffs)
#	Stage name	Song	Identity	Result
1	Astronaut	"Signed, Sealed, Delivered" by Stevie Wonder	undisclosed	SAFE
2	Night Angel	"Million Reasons" by Lady Gaga	undisclosed	SAFE
3	T-Rex	"Push It" by Salt-n-Pepa	undisclosed	SAFE
4	Swan	"I Hate Myself for Loving You" by Joan Jett & the Blackhearts	Bella Thorne	OUT
5	Rhino	"Nice to Meet Ya" by Niall Horan	undisclosed	SAFE

=== Week 8 (March 25) ===
Group number: "Let's Get Loud" by Jennifer Lopez

Performances on the ninth episode (Group C Championships)
#	Stage name	Song	Identity	Result
1	Night Angel	"Shout!" by Isley Brothers	undisclosed	SAFE
2	Astronaut	"Shape of You" by Ed Sheeran	undisclosed	SAFE
3	T-Rex	"Jai Ho! (You Are My Destiny)" by A. R. Rahman & The Pussycat Dolls	JoJo Siwa	OUT
4	Rhino	"Tracks of My Tears" by Smokey Robinson & The Miracles	undisclosed	SAFE

=== Week 9 (April 1) ===
Group number: "ABC" by The Jackson 5 (with altered lyrics)

Performances on the tenth episode (Super Nine)
#	Group	Stage name	Song	Identity	Result
1	A	Turtle	"Higher Love" by Steve Winwood	undisclosed	SAFE
2	A	Kangaroo	"Not Ready to Make Nice" by Dixie Chicks	undisclosed	SAFE
3	A	White Tiger	"I'm Too Sexy" by Right Said Fred	Rob Gronkowski	OUT
4	B	Kitty	"It's All Coming Back to Me Now" by Celine Dion	undisclosed	SAFE
5	B	Banana	"Sweet Home Alabama" by Lynyrd Skynyrd	undisclosed	RISK
6	B	Frog	"Jump" by Kris Kross	undisclosed	SAFE
7	C	Night Angel	"Rise Up" by Andra Day	undisclosed	SAFE
8	C	Rhino	"What a Man Gotta Do" by Jonas Brothers	undisclosed	RISK
9	C	Astronaut	"Never Gonna Give You Up" by Rick Astley	undisclosed	SAFE

=== Week 10 (April 8) ===
Performances on the eleventh episode
#	Stage name	Song	Result	
1	Night Angel	"Man! I Feel Like A Woman" by Shania Twain	WIN	
2	Kangaroo	"No Air" by Jordin Sparks	RISK	
3	Astronaut	"If I Can't Have You" by Shawn Mendes	RISK	
4	Turtle	"Let It Go" by James Bay	WIN	
Smackdown			Identity	Result
1	Kangaroo	"Hot Stuff" by Donna Summer	Jordyn Woods	OUT
2	Astronaut	"Bye Bye Bye" by NSYNC	undisclosed	SAFE

=== Week 11 (April 22) ===
Performances on the twelfth episode
#	Stage name	Song	Result	
1	Frog	"Fireball" by Pitbull	WIN	
2	Kitty	"True Colors" by Cyndi Lauper	RISK	
3	Banana	"Knockin' on Heaven's Door" by Bob Dylan	RISK	
4	Rhino	"10,000 Hours" by Dan + Shay & Justin Bieber	WIN	
Smackdown			Identity	Result
1	Kitty	"Unstoppable" by Sia	undisclosed	SAFE
2	Banana	"Brick House" by The Commodores	Bret Michaels	OUT

=== Week 12 (April 29) ===
Performances on the thirteenth episode
#	Stage name	Song	Identity	Result
1	Kitty	"Diamonds Are a Girl's Best Friend" by Marilyn Monroe	undisclosed	SAFE
2	Rhino	"Die a Happy Man" by Thomas Rhett	undisclosed	SAFE
3	Frog	"Whatever It Takes" by Imagine Dragons	undisclosed	SAFE
4	Night Angel	"Black Velvet" by Alannah Myles	undisclosed	SAFE
5	Astronaut	"Story of My Life" by One Direction	Hunter Hayes	OUT
6	Turtle	"Stay" by Alessia Cara	undisclosed	SAFE

=== Week 13 (May 6) ===
Performances on the fourteenth episode
#	Stage name	Song	Identity	Result
1	Frog	"Bust a Move" by Young MC	undisclosed	SAFE
2	Kitty	"Back to Black" by Amy Winehouse	Jackie Evancho	OUT
3	Rhino	"You've Lost That Lovin' Feelin'" by The Righteous Brothers	undisclosed	SAFE
4	Night Angel	"Last Dance" by Donna Summer	undisclosed	SAFE
5	Turtle	"Fix You" by Coldplay	undisclosed	SAFE

=== Week 14 (May 13) ===
Group number: "The Best" by Tina Turner

Performances on the fifteenth episode
#	Stage name	Song	Identity	Result
1	Night Angel	"How to Love" by Lil Wayne	undisclosed	SAFE
2	Turtle	"Jealous" by Nick Jonas	undisclosed	SAFE
3	Rhino	"Humble and Kind" by Tim McGraw	Barry Zito	OUT
4	Frog	"Hip Hop Hooray" by Naughty by Nature	undisclosed	SAFE

=== Week 15 (May 20) – Finale ===
Performances on the final episode
#	Stage name	Song	Identity	Result
1	Frog	"Bad Boy for Life" by Black Rob, Mark Curry & P. Diddy	Bow Wow	THIRD PLACE
2	Turtle	"Before You Go" by Lewis Capaldi	Jesse McCartney	RUNNER-UP
3	Night Angel	"River Deep, Mountain High" by Tina Turner	Kandi Burruss	WINNER

== Ratings ==
The third season premiered as the Super Bowl LIV lead-out program and was viewed by over 27.3 million people—by far the series' most watched episode. While the broadcast was watched by more than the previous lead-out, The World's Best (22.2 million), and Fox's most recent lead-out, 2017's 24: Legacy (17.6 million), it was lower than the viewership of This Is Us in 2018 (27 million) and far lower than The Voice in 2012 (37.6 million). During the latter half of the season which aired during the COVID-19 pandemic in the United States, the series—like others—experienced viewership and 18–49 rating gains of 10–15 percent compared to the episodes that aired before the outbreak. Excluding the post-Super Bowl premiere, the two-hour April 1 episode was the most watched since the first season's finale. Some, however, considered this increase unexpected due to the popularity of stripped-down performances during the numerous COVID-19 pandemic television specials that aired at the same time. A rival television executive said "if you had to predict which show was going to do well when the Living Room Concert and all that began, Masked Singer would be one of the last you'd choose." The season was watched by 25 percent more viewers and received a 25 percent higher 18–49 rating average than the second—the largest season-over-season increases of all television series broadcast during the 2019–20 television season. Among the more than 130 series aired, The Masked Singer was one of nine to increase in both figures, and one of only two to increase in both by 10 percent or more.

Viewership and ratings per episode of The Masked Singer (American TV series) season 3
No.	Title	Air date	Timeslot (ET)	Rating/share (18–49)	Viewers (millions)	DVR (18–49)	DVR viewers (millions)	Total (18–49)	Total viewers (millions)	Ref.
1	"The Season Kick off Mask Off: Group A"	February 2, 2020	Sunday 10:40 p.m.	8.1/36	23.78	1.2	3.55	9.3	27.33	
2	"The Playoffs: Group A"	February 5, 2020	Wednesday 8:00 p.m.	2.0/10	7.46	1.0	3.01	3.1	10.47	
3	"Masking for a Friend: Group A"	February 12, 2020	Wednesday 8:00 p.m.	1.8/10	6.64	1.0	2.99	2.8	9.63	
4	"A Brand New Six Pack: Group B Kickoff!"	February 19, 2020	Wednesday 8:00 p.m.	2.0/10	7.13	1.2	3.37	3.1	10.50	
5	"Mask-Matics: Group B Playoffs"	February 26, 2020	Wednesday 8:00 p.m.	1.8/9	6.75	1.0	2.88	2.7	9.62	
6	"Friends in High Places: Group B Championships"	March 4, 2020	Wednesday 8:00 p.m.	1.8/10	6.82	0.9	2.67	2.7	9.49	
7	"Last But Not Least: Group C Kickoff!"	March 11, 2020	Wednesday 8:00 p.m.	1.9/10	7.25	1.0	3.02	2.9	10.26	
8	"It Never Hurts to Mask: Group C Playoffs"	March 18, 2020	Wednesday 8:00 p.m.	2.2/10	8.02	0.9	2.71	3.1	10.73	
9	"Old Friends, New Clues: Group C Championships"	March 25, 2020	Wednesday 8:00 p.m.	2.2/10	8.03	0.9	2.69	3.1	10.72	
10	"The Super Nine Masked Singer Special: Groups A, B & C"	April 1, 2020	Wednesday 8:00 p.m.	2.4/12	8.90	1.0	2.83	3.4	11.73	
11	"The Mother Of All Final Face Offs, Part 1"	April 8, 2020	Wednesday 8:00 p.m.	2.1/11	7.94	0.8	2.55	2.9	10.50	
Special	"The Masked Singer: Sing-Along Spectacular"	April 15, 2020	Wednesday 8:00 p.m.	1.8/9	6.87	0.6	2.05	2.4	8.92	
12	"The Mother Of All Final Face Offs, Part 2"	April 22, 2020	Wednesday 8:00 p.m.	2.1/11	8.14	0.8	2.28	2.9	10.42	
13	"The Battle of The Sixes: The Final 6"	April 29, 2020	Wednesday 8:00 p.m.	2.1/11	7.81	0.7	2.12	2.7	9.92	
14	"A Quarter Mask Crisis: The Quarter Finals"	May 6, 2020	Wednesday 8:00 p.m.	1.8/10	7.29	0.7	2.18	2.5	9.47	
15	"A Day In the Mask: The Semi Finals"	May 13, 2020	Wednesday 8:00 p.m.	1.9/10	7.24	0.7	2.16	2.6	9.41	
16	"The Masked Singer: Road to the Finals"	May 19, 2020	Tuesday 8:00 p.m.	1.0/6	4.26	0.2	0.81	1.2	5.07	
17	"Couldn't Mask For Anything More: The Grand Finale!"	May 20, 2020	Wednesday 8:00 p.m.	2.3/14	9.01	0.5	1.76	2.9	10.76	
