= Jordyn Woods =

American socialite (born 1997)

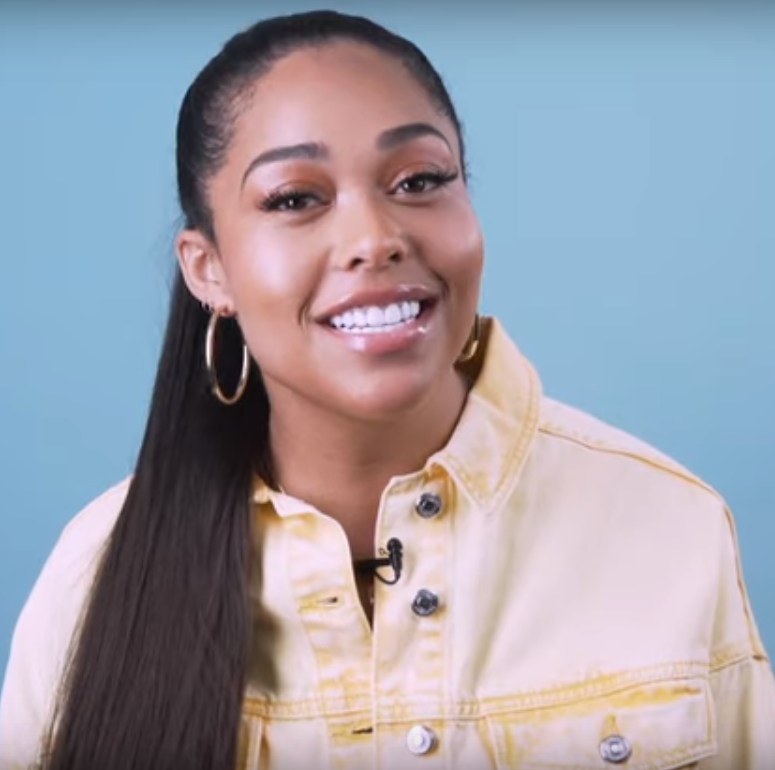
- Woods in 2019
- Born: Jordyn Elizabeth Woods; September 23, 1997 (age 29); Los Angeles, California, U.S.
- Other name: Heir Jordyn
- Occupations: Socialite; model
- Years active: 2016–present
- Television: Life of Kylie; The Masked Singer
- Spouse: Karl-Anthony Towns (m. 2026)
- Website: https://woodsbyjordyn.com/

Jordyn Elizabeth Woods-Towns (born September 23, 1997) is an American model, socialite, and singer. The daughter of The Fresh Prince of Bel-Air sound engineer John Woods, she grew up as part of the Smith family's extended circle through her family's longtime friendship with Will Smith. As a childhood friend of Kylie Jenner, she gained prominence from her appearances on the reality television series Keeping Up with the Kardashians, later starring on Life of Kylie.

== Early life ==
Jordyn Elizabeth Woods was born in Los Angeles on September 23, 1997, to John Woods, a television sound engineer, and Elizabeth Woods, a talent and brand manager. She has two brothers, named John Jr. and Joshua, and a sister named Jodie. She was raised in Oak Park, California and remembers being one of only two black girls at her school. Woods' parents later divorced, and she moved around frequently, eventually deciding to do homeschooling after her family moved to Calabasas, California when she was thirteen. Woods' father died from cancer when she was nineteen.

Her father worked on The Fresh Prince of Bel-Air, and her family is close with Will Smith and Jada Pinkett Smith, whom she considers her uncle and aunt.

Woods modeled briefly as a child.

== Career ==
=== Modeling ===
Woods was signed to Wilhelmina in 2015 after an agent discovered her on Instagram and asked if she was interested in modeling. In May 2016, Woods walked her first runway in the Lane Bryant and Christian Siriano fashion show. Woods was a model for Khloé Kardashian's clothing company, Good American, from 2016 until 2019.

In 2017, Woods walked in her first New York Fashion Week show. She appeared on the September 2019 cover of Cosmopolitan UK.

=== Television ===
Woods starred in all episodes of the 2017 reality television show Life of Kylie, and also appeared in some episodes of Keeping Up with the Kardashians. Woods was also a celebrity guest on the 2019 season of VH1's Hip Hop Squares.

In 2020, Woods competed in season three of The Masked Singer as "Kangaroo".

Woods made her acting debut in 2019 on an episode of grown-ish, in which she played Dee. Her character was living in a dorm and contemplating suicide, and the resident director worked to bring awareness to black mental health on campus. She later appeared on the BET+ film Sacrifice and had a leading role in a 2020 BET+ film Trigger as Vanessa Mass.

=== Business ventures ===
In August 2018, Woods launched her own size-inclusive activewear line, SECNDNTURE.

In September 2018, Kylie Cosmetics launched the Kylie x Jordyn collection, a collaboration between the two friends. In June 2019, Woods launched a clothing line with Boohoo.com.

In July 2019, Woods starred in Rick Ross's music video. In October 2019, Woods launched a hair extensions line with Easilocks.

In October 2020, Woods collaborated with PrettyLittleThing, creating the Quarantine Collection.

In 2021, Woods launched her fitness and wellbeing app called FRSTPLACE. She created the app to help her community start putting themselves first, improve their mental and physical wellbeing. The app provides fitness plans created by expert trainers, and recipes by top nutritionists.

== Personal life ==
Woods has been open about her struggle with her body image and the impact that growing up in Hollywood had on her self-image.

Woods had a highly publicized friendship and lived with Kylie Jenner until February 2019, when she was accused of having been involved with Jenner's half-sister Khloé Kardashian's boyfriend and father of her children, Tristan Thompson. Woods often helped Jenner take care of her daughter, Stormi Webster. Woods and Jenner publicly reconciled a few years later.

In May 2020, Woods began dating basketball player Karl-Anthony Towns. She rents a house in Los Angeles. Woods announced her engagement to Towns on Christmas Day 2025. They married on August 15, 2026, in Malibu, California.

== Filmography ==
=== As herself ===
Reality television
Year	Title	Notes	Ref.
2015–2019	Keeping Up with the Kardashians	Multiple guest appearances	
2017	Life of Kylie	Main role	
2019	Hip Hop Squares		
2020	The Masked Singer	As "Kangaroo"	

=== As actress ===
Television and film
Year	Title	Role	Notes	Ref.
2019	Grown-ish	Dee	1 episode	
2019	Sacrifice	Isis Rey		
2020	Trigger	Vanessa Mass		

== Awards and nominations ==
Award	Year	Nominee(s)	Category	Result	Ref.
Give Her FlowHERS Awards	2023	Herself and Jodie Woods	My Sister’s Keeper Award	Won	
