= Hrush Achemyan =

Armenian-American make-up artist

- Born: Hranush Alexis Achemyan; July 19, 1987 (age 38); Armenian SSR, USSR
- Other names: Hrush
- Occupation: Make-up artist
- Years active: 2006–present
- Website: styledbyhrush.com

Hranush Alexis "Hrush" Achemyan (Armenian: Հրանուշ «Հրուշ» Աճեմյան; born July 19, 1987) is an Armenian-American celebrity make-up artist and beauty influencer.

== Early life ==
Achemyan was born as Hranush Alexis Achemyan in the Armenian Soviet Socialist Republic of the Soviet Union. After the dissolution of the Soviet Union, Achemyan immigrated with her family to the United States when she was five years old. Achemyan first began painting, which then led her to being a self-taught make-up artist.

== Career ==
She started her make-up stylist career in 2006, with forming the Le Rush company in California, in 2008, which is now Styled by Hrush. Achemyan has since gone on to style most of the Kardashians and Jenners, namely Kylie Jenner and Kim Kardashian. Her career has led to a make-up touring business, such as the Alter Ego Tour.

=== Fashion design ===
Achemyan is a self proclaimed make up artist.

=== Music ===
In 2019, Achemyan released her debut single "Wish em Well" along with its music video uploaded on her YouTube channel.

== Personal life ==
She resides in the Los Angeles, California area, where she operates her business.

In 2020, Achemyan used her raise awareness about the Nagorno Karabakh war between Armenia and Azerbaijan and called for international action to stop Azerbaijan from shelling civilian areas of Artsakh and urged international community to recognize Artsakh's independence. A relative of hers from Armenia, Garik Achemyan, died in the war.
