= Annie Young-Scrivner =

American business executive

- Education: Foster School of Business, University of Washington (BA); Carlson School of Management, University of Minnesota (MBA)
- Occupation(s): Chief Executive Officer, Wella Company
- Years active: 2017–present
- Spouse: Scott Scrivner
- Children: 2

Annie Young-Scrivner is a Chinese-American business executive who is now serving two years as the chief executive officer of Wella Company. She previously held senior positions at Godiva Chocolatier, PepsiCo, and Starbucks.

== Early life and education ==
Young-Scrivner was born to Chinese parents, Frank and Nancy Young. Her family moved to the United States when she was seven. Growing up, she and her family started several small businesses in various industries. She has a bachelor's degree in marketing from the Foster School of Business at the University of Washington (1991), and an MBA from the Carlson School of Business, University of Minnesota (2003). She continued her education at Yale School of Management, Darden School of Management and the International Institute for Management Development in Switzerland.

== Career ==
Before joining Wella Company, Young-Scrivner served three years as CEO of Godiva Chocolatier. She also previously worked at Starbucks, where she held several leadership roles, including global chief marketing officer and president of Tazo Tea. Young-Scrivner began her career with a 20-year tenure at PepsiCo. There, she held positions in marketing, sales, and general management, working in 30 different countries worldwide and serving as president and chairperson of PepsiCo Foods in Greater China.

At Starbucks, she started as global CMO and president of Tazo Tea from 2009. She was president of Starbucks Canada from 2012 to 2014, president of Teavana and executive vice president of Global Tea for Starbucks from 2014 to 2016, and executive vice president, Global Digital & Loyalty Development from 2016. She left the organization in 2017 when she was hired by Godiva.

Young-Scrivner serves on the board of directors of Wella Company and YUM! Brands. Her past board leadership includes Tiffany & Co., Macy's Inc., and Starbucks Japan. She is the Chairman of the Dean's advisory board for the Foster School of Business at the University of Washington and a member of The Wall Street Journal's CEO Council, Fast Company's Impact Council, and the Fortune Most Powerful Women community.

In October 2020, Young-Scrivner was slated to be the new CEO of Wella Company by investment firm KKR in their announced acquisition of 60% of the company from Coty. Her appointment became effective in December 2020. The standalone Wella Company was founded in 1880 by Franz Ströher and consists of a family of iconic brands including Wella Professionals, O·P·I, ghd, Briogeo, Nioxin, Sebastian Professional, and Clairol. It is one of the fastest-growing companies in the beauty sector and is committed to focusing on DEI, ESG, and building a purpose-driven business.

== Personal life ==
Young-Scrivner is married to Scott Scrivner. They have a son and a daughter.

== See also ==
- List of chocolatiers
