= Erika Pohl-Ströher =

Erika Pohl-Ströher (18 January 1919 – 18 December 2016) was a German business executive, heiress, and collector of minerals and German folk art. She was resident in Switzerland for much of her life.

== Life ==
Pohl-Stroher was born on 18 January 1919 in Wurzen in Saxony, East Germany and grew up in Rothenkirchen in Vogtland.

She studied chemistry and biology at the University of Jena and received a doctorate in biology. She died on 18 December 2016 at the age of 97.

== Business career ==
Pohl-Stroher's grandparents, Franz and Marie Stroeher, founded the hair care and cosmetics company Wella AG in the 19th century. When Procter & Gamble bought the company for more than $4 billion in 2003, Pohl-Stroher received around $1.1 billion for her 23% stake. Her net worth was estimated by Forbes magazine to be US$1.3 billion making her the 101st wealthiest person in Germany at the time of her death.

== Art and mineral collection ==
From 1978 until her death, Pohl-Ströher amassed a large collection of European portrait miniatures from the 16th through the 19th centuries, including works by, among many others, Nicholas Hilliard, Rosalba Carriera, Jean-Étienne Liotard, Heinrich Friedrich Füger, Jean-Baptiste Jacques Augustin, and Moritz Michael Daffinger. In 2018, the collection was auctioned by Sotheby's for more than 1.7 million GBP.

Pohl-Ströher was also known for her collection of minerals, which she acquired over sixty years. She permanently loaned her collection to TU Bergakademie Freiberg in 2004, and part of the collection was put on public display at the Terra Mineralia museum in Freiberg, Saxony, in 2008. The collection is known particularly for its crystals. Pohl-Ströher received a number of geosciences award, including the Stein im Brett by the Association of German Geologists and an honorary doctorate from TU Bergakademie Freiberg's Faculty for Geosciences, Geotechnical Engineering and Mining.

The mineral Erikapohlite was named in her honour in 2010.
