= OPI Products =

American nail polish brand

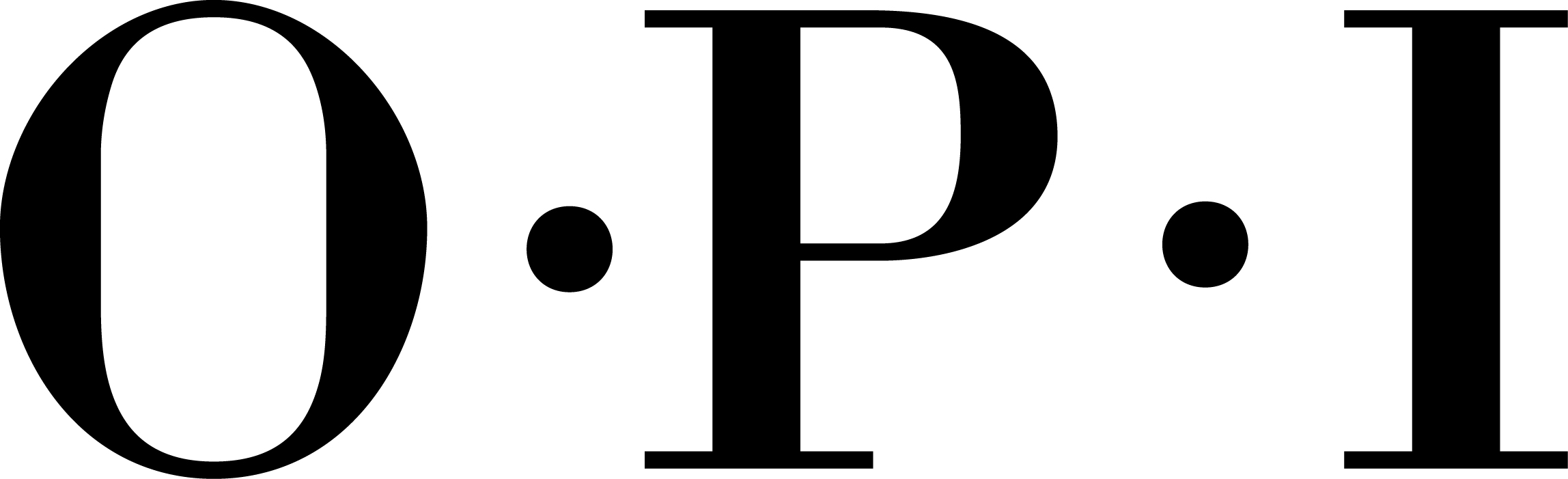
- Type: Subsidiary
- Industry: cosmetic industry
- Founded: 1981; 45 years ago
- Headquarters: Calabasas, California,
- Key people: Annie Young-Scrivner, CEO - Wella Company; George W. Schaeffer, Co-Founder; Suzi Weiss-Fischmann, Co-Founder & Brand Ambassador
- Products: Nail polish
- Number of employees: 500 +
- Parent: Wella Company
- Website: opi.com

OPI Products, branded as O·P·I, is an American nail polish manufacturer headquartered in Calabasas, California and a subsidiary of Wella Company.

== History ==
OPI, originally named Odontorium Products Inc., was a small dental supply company purchased by George Schaeffer in 1981. Shortly after taking over the company, Schaeffer was joined by Hungarian-born Suzi Weiss-Fischmann, OPI's Executive Vice President and Artistic Director. Schaeffer and Weiss-Fischmann partnered with R. Eric Montgomery, a biochemist, and created an acrylic system that Schaeffer sold door-to-door to local nail salons. They closed the dental sales and focused entirely on nail products changing the name to OPI Products Inc.

In 1989, OPI expanded its portfolio to nail lacquers and later other products. In 2003, OPI created a Legally Blonde 2 collection that was also featured in the film. Collaborations that have followed include Ford Mustang, the 2010 film Alice in Wonderland, and Dell (2009).

In 2003, OPI launched a nail polish line for dogs called Pawlish that received mixed reviews. In 2007, after pressure from the EPA and the organization Campaign for Safe Cosmetics, OPI reformulated its nail lacquers and eliminated chemicals DBP (dibutyl phthalate), formaldehyde and toluene.

In 2010, OPI was acquired by Coty, Inc. In 2014, Coty appointed Mary van Praag as General Manager of OPI. Van Praag replaced John Heffner, the now CEO of Drybar.

On December 1, 2020, Coty completed sale of Wella, Clairol, OPI and ghd brands stake to KKR for $2.5bn in cash whilst retaining 40% stake in the standalone company. On October 1, 2021, Coty announced that it would sell approximately 9% of its shares to KKR for $426.5 million. The deal cuts Coty's stake in Wella, Clairol, OPI and ghd brands to around 30.6%.

On November 8, 2021, Coty has agreed to sell an approximate 4.7% stake in Wella to KKR in exchange for the redemption of approximately 56% of KKR's remaining convertible preferred shares in Coty. The deal reduces Coty's total shareholding in Wella, Clairol, OPI and ghd brands to approximately 25.9%. KKR will continue to have a 2.4% ownership stake in Coty on an as-converted basis.
