= Ströher =

Ströher is a German surname. Notable people with the surname include:

- Franz Ströher (1854–1936), German hairdresser and businessman
- Sylvia Ströher (born 1954), German businesswoman and writer
