= Lawrence M. Gelb =

American chemist and businessman (1898–1980)

- Born: January 15, 1898
- Died: September 27, 1980 (aged 82)
- Known for: Co-founder of Clairol
- Spouse: Joan Clair Gelb
- Children: Richard L. Gelb; Bruce Gelb

Lawrence M. Gelb (January 15, 1898 – September 27, 1980) was an American chemist and businessman from New York City who along with his wife, Joan Clair, founded the Clairol hair-coloring company in 1931, now a division of Coty.

Their sons Richard L. Gelb and Bruce Gelb, have each held executive positions at pharmaceutical company Bristol-Myers Squibb, which purchased Clairol in 1957.

His legacy, the Lawrence M. Gelb Foundation, provides grants to worthy causes.
