= Josh Wood =

Josh Wood may refer to:

- Josh Wood (rugby league), English rugby league footballer
- Josh Wood (hairdresser), British hairdresser

== See also ==
- Josh Woods (American football) (born 1996), American football player
- Josh Woods (wrestler)
