= Sylvia Ströher =

German businesswoman (born 1954)

Sylvia Ströher (born 30 May 1954) is a German businesswoman, ranked by Forbes since 2003 as one of the wealthiest people in the world. Sylvia is a great-granddaughter of Franz Ströher, a German entrepreneur and hairdresser, the founder of Wella AG.

== Life ==
In 2004 the Stroher family sold their almost 80% stake in Wella AG, the world's second biggest professional hair care group, to Procter & Gamble for $4 billion.

She's married to Ulrich Ströher, né Fette, a former nurse who took her name when they married. Ströher is an art collector. With her husband she assembled a private collection of German post-World War II art, comprising around 1500 items. Some of the works are exhibited in Museum Küppersmühle in Duisburg, Germany.
