= 34th People's Choice Awards =

Pop culture award show held in 2008

- Date: January 8, 2008
- Location: Shrine Auditorium, Los Angeles, California
- Hosted by: Queen Latifah

Television/radio coverage
- Network: CBS
- Runtime: 2 hours
- Directed by: Bruce Gowers

The 34th People's Choice Awards, honoring the best in popular culture for 2007, were held on January 8, 2008 at the Shrine Auditorium in Los Angeles, California. They were hosted by Queen Latifah and broadcast on CBS. Unlike previous years, the ceremony was taped and winners were shown accepting their awards in pre-taped segments due to actors not wanting to cross the picket lines of the striking Writers Guild of America.

== Nominations and winners ==
Nominees and winners were chosen by those who registered with the awards shows official website.

=== Awards ===
Winners are listed first, in bold. Other nominees are in alphabetical order.

Favorite New TV Comedy	Favorite Song From A Soundtrack
**Samantha Who?**; Aliens in America; Back to You; The Big Bang Theory; Carpoolers; Cavemen; Chuck; Reaper; Pushing Daisies	**"You Can't Stop the Beat" by Cast of Hairspray, Hairspray**; "Read My Mind" by The Killers, Friday Night Lights; "What I've Done" by Linkin Park, Transformers
Favorite Movie Drama	Favorite Funny Male Star
**Harry Potter and the Order of the Phoenix**; Disturbia; Premonition	**Robin Williams**; Will Ferrell; Adam Sandler
Favorite Male Action Star	Favorite Movie
**Matt Damon**; Johnny Depp; Bruce Willis	**Pirates of the Caribbean: At World's End**; The Bourne Ultimatum; Transformers
Favorite Threequel	Favorite Sci-Fi Show
**Pirates of the Caribbean: At World's End**; The Bourne Ultimatum; Spider-Man 3	**Stargate Atlantis**; Battlestar Galactica; Doctor Who
Favorite Independent Movie	Favorite Pop Song
**Becoming Jane**; A Mighty Heart; Sicko	**"What Goes Around...Comes Around"** by Justin Timberlake; "Big Girls Don't Cry" by Fergie; "Irreplaceable" by Beyoncé
Favorite Rock Song	Favorite Female Singer
**"Home"** by Daughtry; "Hey There Delilah" by Plain White T's; "Makes Me Wonder" by Maroon 5	**Gwen Stefani**; Beyoncé; Fergie
Favorite Male Movie Star	Favorite Male Singer
**Johnny Depp**; Denzel Washington; Bruce Willis	**Justin Timberlake**; John Mayer; Tim McGraw
Favorite TV Comedy	Favorite Funny Female Star
**Two and a Half Men**; The King of Queens; My Name Is Earl	**Ellen DeGeneres**; Whoopi Goldberg; Wanda Sykes
Favorite Family Movie	Favorite Female Movie Star
**Shrek the Third**; Evan Almighty; Ratatouille	**Reese Witherspoon**; Halle Berry; Sandra Bullock
Nice 'n Easy Fans Favorite Hair	Favorite Breakout Artist
**Scarlett Johansson**; Fergie; Hilary Duff	**Boys Like Girls**; J. Holiday; Bucky Covington
Favorite Movie Comedy	Favorite TV Drama
**Knocked Up**; The Simpsons Movie; Wild Hogs	**House**; CSI: Crime Scene Investigation; Law & Order: Special Victims Unit
Favorite Group	Favorite Leading Lady
**Rascal Flatts**; Daughtry; Maroon 5	**Drew Barrymore**; Jessica Alba; Queen Latifah
Favorite Action Movie	Favorite Reunion Tour
**The Bourne Ultimatum**; 300; Transformers	**The Police**; Genesis; Van Halen
Favorite Female TV Star	Favorite Hip-Hop Song
**Katherine Heigl**; Sally Field; Jennifer Love Hewitt	**"Give It to Me"** by Timbaland w/Justin Timberlake and Nelly Furtado; "Party Like a Rockstar" by Shop Boyz; "Stronger" by Kanye West
Favorite Animated Comedy	Favorite Leading Man
**The Simpsons**; Family Guy; King of the Hill	**Joaquin Phoenix**; Jamie Foxx; Dwayne "The Rock" Johnson
Favorite Country Song	Favorite Talk Show Host
**"Stand"** by Rascal Flatts; "I Need You" by Tim McGraw w/Faith Hill; "Never Wanted Nothing More" by Kenny Chesney	**Ellen DeGeneres**; Jay Leno; Oprah Winfrey
Favorite On Screen Match-Up	Favorite R&B Song
**George Clooney & Brad Pitt, Ocean's Thirteen**; Jackie Chan & Chris Tucker, Rush Hour 3; Kirsten Dunst & Tobey Maguire, Spider-Man 3	**"Shut Up and Drive"** by Rihanna; "Beautiful Liar" by Beyoncé and Shakira; "Because of You" by Ne-Yo
Favorite Competition/Reality Show	Favorite Female Action Star
**Dancing with the Stars**; American Idol; Extreme Makeover: Home Edition	**Keira Knightley**; Jessica Alba; Jodie Foster
Favorite New TV Drama	Favorite Male TV Star
**Moonlight**; Big Shots; Bionic Woman; Cane; Dirty Sexy Money; Gossip Girl; Journeyman; K-Ville; Life; Life Is Wild; Private Practice; Women's Murder Club	**Patrick Dempsey**; Charlie Sheen; Kiefer Sutherland
Favorite Scene Stealing Star	Favorite Game Show
**Chandra Wilson**, Grey's Anatomy; Richard Belzer, Law & Order: Special Victims Unit; Neil Patrick Harris, How I Met Your Mother	**Deal or No Deal**; Are You Smarter than a 5th Grader?; Jeopardy!

=== Other awards ===
- Crest & Scope's Spotlight Shining Smile
- **Yomarie T. Milwaukee, Wisconsin**
- Karla D. Atlanta, Georgia
- Anisa I. Seattle, Washington
  - The winner was supposed to be "Miss People's Choice" and present the awards to the winners, but this was scrapped due to the writers strike (see top of the page).
- Favorite User-Generated Video
- **"Shoes"**
- "Beatboxing Flute "Inspector Gadget" Remix"
- "Chocolate Rain"
- "Daft Hands -- Harder, Better, Faster, Stronger"
- "Leave Britney Alone!"
