= GHDS =

GHDs or GHDS may refer to:

- Guitar Hero: On Tour series for the Nintendo DS
- Hair straightening irons, especially by Good Hair Day
