= Gaustad (musician) =

American singer-songwriter

- Born: November 28, 2001 (age 24); United States
- Genre: Pop
- Occupations: singer; songwriter; music producer
- Instruments: vocals; guitar; piano
- Years active: 2018–present
- Label: Gaustad
- Website: gaustadofficial.com

Gaustad is an American singer and songwriter based in Los Angeles. Gaustad rose to prominence in 2018 when they launched a YouTube channel with their performance of Hozier's "Take Me to Church" which received more than 25 million views.

== Career ==
Gaustad's first EP, Welcome to Jupiter 1.0, was released on April 30, 2021. Their debut album BLKBX: wht r u hding? was released the same year on September 10, 2021. The album features connections with Gaustad's charity, the BLKBX Project and addresses experiences with bullying and growing up as part of the LGBTQ+ community.

"93 Days", one of BLKBX's singles, featured actor Mariska Hargitay in its music video, as did "Disappear" and "The Cloud" off their 2023 album, PILLBX: whts ur fantasy?.

Gaustad's song Hero was included in Netflix's Rescued by Ruby.

In June 2022, Gaustad began releasing songs off their second album, PILLBX: whts ur fantasy?. The November 2022 single "Like a Person," released early following the Colorado Springs nightclub shooting, is about Gaustad's experience as a member of the LGBTQ+ community. The music video features trans activist and influencer Dylan Mulvaney. The album was eventually released on June 2, 2023.

Their second EP, Welcome to Jupiter 2.0, was released on May 3, 2024.

Following a string of singles and a brief hiatus, they surprise-released their third album MATCHBX: who r u? on October 30, 2026.

== Discography ==
=== Albums ===
- BLKBX: wht r u hding? (2021)
- PILLBX: whts ur fantasy? (2023)
- MATCHBX: who r u? (2026)

=== EPs ===
- Human (2019)
- Welcome to Jupiter 1.0 (2021)
- Welcome to Jupiter 2.0 (2024)

== Personal life ==
Gaustad is non-binary and uses they/them pronouns. Their mother is Cristina Carlino of cosmetics brand Philosophy.
