= Suzi Weiss-Fischmann =

Hungarian-American businessperson

- Born: 1956 (age 69–70); Hungary
- Occupations: Company Founder, cosmetics businesswoman

Suzi Weiss-Fischmann (born 1956) is a Hungarian-American businessperson. She is the co-founder of OPI Products (Odontorium Products Inc.) with her brother-in-law George Schaeffer. Weiss-Fischmann is a second-generation Holocaust survivor born in Hungary and the author of the book I'm Not Really a Waitress. The name of her book refers to one of Weiss-Fischmann's most well known nail colors. The color, which Weiss-Fischmann named, was inducted into Allure's Beauty Hall of Fame in 2011 and won the Best Nail Polish award nine times.

== Biography ==
Weiss-Fischmann grew up in communist Hungary and came to the United States as a teenager. She first lived in New York before moving to Southern California in the 1980s.

In California, she started working for her brother-in-law who had purchased a dental supply company, Odontorium Products Inc. in 1981. Weiss-Fischmann started working in sales for the company. In 1987, Weiss-Fischmann felt that there were not enough color choices for nails on the market. She is known as the "First Lady of Nails" after creating the OPI nail lacquers starting in 1989. OPI was sold to Coty, Inc. in 2010 for close to $1 billion.

Weiss-Fischmann was named to Jewish Women International's board of trustees in 2012.
