= Good Hair Day =

Manufacturer of hair care products

- Company type: Privately held
- Industry: Hair styling
- Founded: January 2001
- Founder: Martin Penny, Gary Douglas and Robert Powls
- Headquarters: Wellington Place, Leeds, United Kingdom
- Revenue: ▲£50,360,000 (2006)
- Net income: ▲£9,600,000 (2006)
- Parent: Wella
- Website: ghdhair.com

Good Hair Day, abbreviated to ghd, is a manufacturer of hair care products based in Leeds, United Kingdom. The company is known for its hair straightening irons and is sold in over 50,000 salons worldwide. The company was the first hair tool sponsor of the Victoria's Secret Fashion Show.

== History ==
Martin Penny, Gary Douglas, Susan Powls, and Robert Powls founded ghd in January 2001. The four collaborated to buy the rights to a hair straightening iron from an inventor in South Korea. The brand grew organically from word of mouth, and began their first advertising campaign two years later. By then, hair salons had purchased £12 million of stock, against a forecast of between £3 million and £4 million.

In May 2004, ghd entered the North American market, which helped generate worldwide sales of £37 million for the year. In July 2006, The Jemella Group, which owned the ghd brand, was bought by Lloyds Development Capital for £55 million. It was sold eleven months later to Montagu Private Equity for £160 million. in February 2013, Lion Capital, a British private equity firm, purchased ghd for approximately £300 million.

By March 2013, the company had sales totalling over £150 million, more than doubling since 2007, selling over two million styling irons through 50,000 salons worldwide. In 2016, Coty bought ghd for an estimated £420 million from the private equity firm Lion Capital LLP. The sale was completed on 21 November 2016.

On December 1, 2020, Coty completed sale of Wella, Clairol, OPI and ghd brands stake to KKR for $2.5bn in cash whilst retaining 40% stake in the standalone company. On October 1, 2021, Coty announced that it would sell approximately 9% of its shares to KKR for $426.5 million. The deal cuts Coty's stake in Wella, Clairol, OPI and ghd brands to around 30.6%.

On November 8, 2021, Coty has agreed to sell an approximate 4.7% stake in Wella to KKR in exchange for the redemption of approximately 56% of KKR's remaining convertible preferred shares in Coty. The deal reduces Coty's total shareholding in Wella, Clairol, OPI and ghd brands to approximately 25.9%. KKR will continue to have a 2.4% ownership stake in Coty on an as-converted basis.

=== Products ===
- In 2011, ghd launched the V Gold Series styler.
- In 2012, ghd launched the Air Professional hairdryer.
- In March 2013, ghd launched the "Eclipse" hair straightener. The consistent temperature reduces the time to style hair, particularly coarse hair that may previously taken multiple run throughs.
- In 2014, ghd launched the Aura hairdryer and ghd Curve, hair curling range.
- In 2015, ghd launched the Platinum styler.
- In 2018, ghd Platinum Plus styler was launched.
- In 2023, ghd Duet Style wet to dry styler was launched
- In 2024, ghd Duet Blow Dry wet to dry hair dryer brush was launched.
- In 2024, ghd Chronos styler was launched.
- In 2025, ghd Chronos Max styler was launched.
- In 2025, ghd Chronos Curve curlers were launched.
- In 2026, ghd Speed hairdryer was launched.

== Advertising and sponsorship ==
- ghd launched its first advertising campaign in August 2003, as the sponsor of the British reality television show The Salon.
- In November 2009, ghd ran a popular series of advertisements titled 'Twisted Fairytales' that included depictions of characters such as Rapunzel, Little Red Riding Hood, and Cinderella.
- In October 2011, ghd launched the "Scarlet Collection" with Katy Perry as the face of the campaign. Photos for the campaign were shot by the photographer David LaChapelle. * ghd has also partnered with Victoria's Secret for a multi-year sponsorship of its annual fashion show. The company is the first ever hair tool sponsor for a Victoria's Secret fashion show.

=== Endorsements ===
The brand has attracted endorsements from a variety of celebrities including the singer Katy Perry who became the face of ghd in December 2011.

== Charity ==
Since 2004, ghd has raised approximately £2.5 million for the Breakthrough Breast Cancer charity. The company produces a limited edition pink hair iron every year, with £10 of the sale price being donated in support the charity. In January 2010, ghd partnered with charity "Mom It Forward" and SafeHouse Denver, a women's shelter that serves victims of domestic violence and their children, in an event at Sephora.
