= Wernesgrüner =

German brewery

Wernesgrüner Brauerei GmbH
- Wernesgrüner
- Location: Steinberg-Wernesgrün, Germany
- Opened: 1436
- Annual production volume: 850,000 hectolitres (720,000 US bbl)
- Owned by: Bitburger Braugruppe GmbH

Active beers
Name	Type
Wernesgrüner Pils Legend	Pilsener

The Wernesgrüner Brewery or Wernesgrüner Brauerei GmbH is a brewery in Steinberg-Wernesgrün, Saxony, Germany.

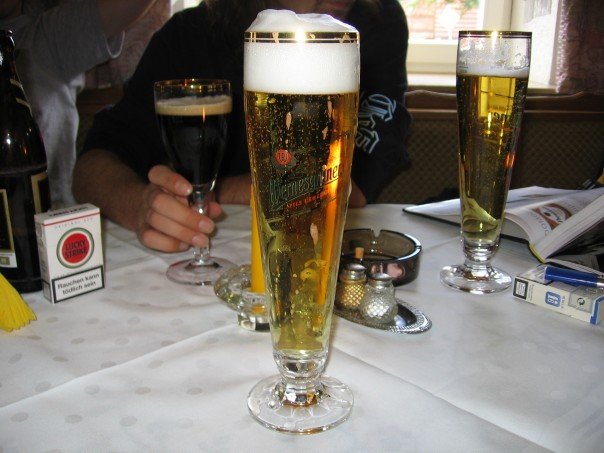
Wernesgrüner Pils

The brewery was founded in 1436 when the brothers Schorer acquired the rights to brew and open a tavern. After establishing property for bottling they soon began brewing on what would become the foundations of the "Wernesgrüner Pils Legend". It is known as the aforementioned "Pils Legend," because it was a bitter specialty during the communist period in the DDR.

Throughout the company's history it has undergone numerous changes of ownership. In 1762 the Günnel family bought the Schorer brewery. In 1774 the Männel family took over the bottling properties. Even though at the end of the 19th century the label had five independent breweries, the families were still competing with each other. By 1910 the company had established itself throughout Germany and the Netherlands, and was even served on the renowned Hapag-Lloyd ships that ran from Hamburg to America. The company was acquired by Bitburger Braugruppe GmbH in 2002. In 2021 it was taken over by the Carlsberg Group. Output as of May 2018 was 850,000 hl per year. In the United States, the United Kingdom and Australia, the brand is sold by Aldi (Süd).
