= Bruce Gelb =

American businessman and diplomat (1927–2025)

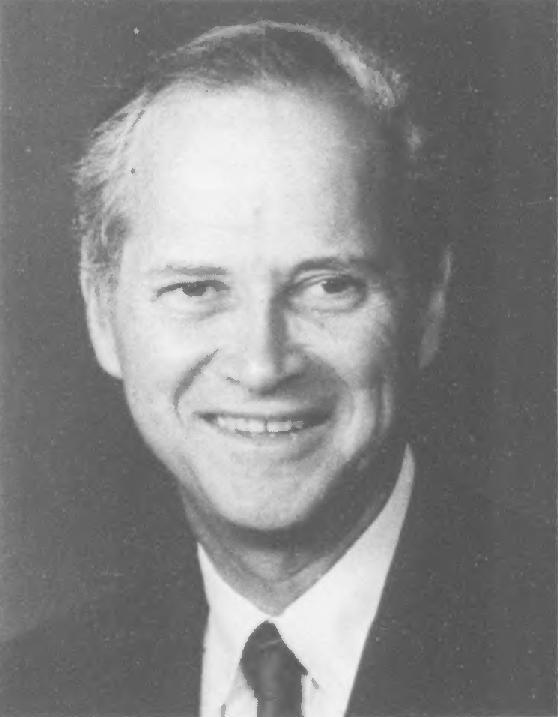

United States Ambassador to Belgium
- In office November 10, 1991 – July 11, 1993
- President: George H. W. Bush
- Preceded by: Maynard W. Glitman
- Succeeded by: Alan Blinken

Personal details
- Born: February 24, 1927 New York City, U.S.
- Died: November 17, 2025 (aged 98) Naples, Florida, U.S.
- Party: Republican

Bruce Stuart Gelb (February 24, 1927 – November 17, 2025) was an American businessman and diplomat. He served as the president of Clairol and vice chairman of Bristol-Myers Squibb.

== Background ==
Gelb was born in New York City on February 24, 1927. His father, Lawrence M. Gelb and mother, Joan Friedman founded Clairol in 1931. Gelb graduated from the Choate School in 1945. Gelb was in the military and went on to receive a B.A. from Yale in 1950 and an M.B.A. from Harvard in 1953.

Gelb died on November 17, 2025, at the age of 98 in Naples, Florida.

== Appointments ==
- Director of the United States Information Agency (George H.W. Bush) from 1989 to 1991
- Ambassador to Belgium (George H. W. Bush) from 1991 to 1993
- Commissioner for the United Nations, Consular Corps and International Business (Mayor Rudolph W. Giuliani) from 1994 to 1997
- Board of Trustees of the Woodrow Wilson International Center for Scholars (George W. Bush) 2003-2006

He was a Vice Chairman of the Executive Committee of the Madison Square Boys and Girls Club; a Life Trustee of Choate Rosemary Hall; a board member of the United Nations Development Corporation; a member of the Board of Trustees of the American Council on Science and Health; Honorary Chairman and a Regent of the Center for Security Policy; and a member of the Advisory Board of the USC Center on Public Diplomacy.

Diplomatic posts
Preceded by Maynard W. Glitman	United States Ambassador to Belgium; 1991–1993	Succeeded by Alan Blinken
