= Maynard W. Glitman =

American diplomat (1933–2010)

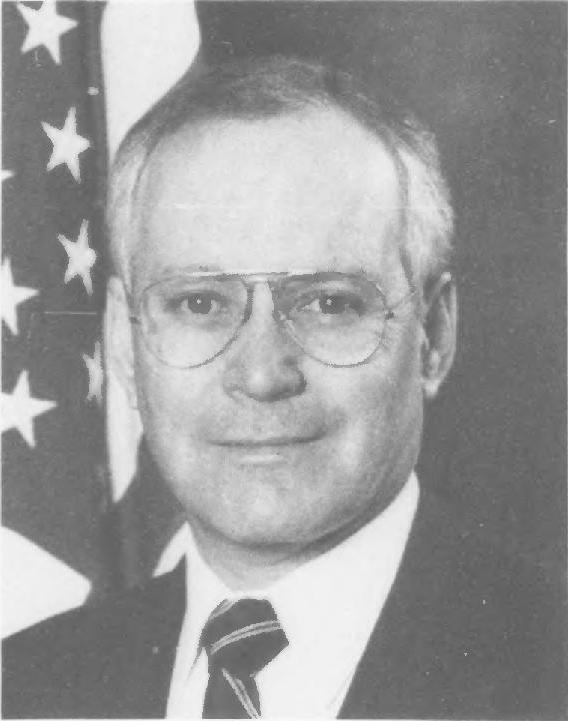

United States Ambassador to Belgium
- In office July 15, 1988 – June 17, 1991
- President: Ronald Reagan; George H. W. Bush
- Preceded by: Geoffrey Swaebe
- Succeeded by: Bruce Gelb

Personal details
- Born: December 8, 1933 Chicago, Illinois, U.S.
- Died: December 13, 2010 (aged 77) Vermont, U.S.
- Spouse: G. Christine Amundsen
- Education: University of Illinois; Tufts University
- Profession: Diplomat

Maynard Wayne Glitman (December 8, 1933 – December 13, 2010) was an American diplomat. Glitman negotiated the Intermediate-Range Nuclear Forces Treaty in 1987. Later, Glitman served as the United States Ambassador to Belgium from 1988 to 1991.

== Early life and education ==
Glitman was born in Chicago, Illinois, on December 8, 1933, to Reada and Ben Glitman. He earned a bachelor's degree with highest honors from the University of Illinois in 1955, where he was a member of Phi Beta Kappa. Glitman later completed a master's degree in 1956, from the Tufts University, Fletcher School of Law and Diplomacy.

== Career ==
Glitman started his 38-year career in the U.S. Foreign Service in 1956. During that time, he served in the Departments of State and Defense in Washington, D.C., and in numerous other positions. In Washington, he served as Deputy Assistant Secretary of State for International Trade Policy, and also as Deputy Assistant Secretary of Defense for International Security Affairs.

Glitman's early foreign postings included Nassau, Bahamas, Ottawa, Canada and Paris, France. In 1977, he was assigned as Deputy Chief of Mission at the United States Mission to NATO in Brussels, Belgium.

In 1981, he became intensely involved in Arms Control issues as the Deputy Chief negotiator in the Intermediate-Range Nuclear Forces negotiation in Geneva, Switzerland. During the hiatus in the talks caused by the walk out of the Soviet delegation, he was posted to Vienna, Austria where he served as the Chief United States Representative, to the Mutual and Balanced Force Reduction Negotiations. When the INF talks resumed six months later, President Reagan called him to return to Geneva and lead the delegation in renewed talks with the Soviet Union. Those talks successfully concluded in 1987, when the U.S. Senate ratified the INF treaty eliminating an entire class of nuclear weapons, a significant achievement in the ending of the Cold War. His last posting as Ambassador to the Kingdom of Belgium concluded a long and successful career in service to his country.

== Later life and death ==
After retiring from the Foreign Service, Ambassador Glitman wrote articles for many foreign affairs publications, served as diplomat in residence and an adjunct political science professor at the University of Vermont.

Glitman died after a struggle with dementia in Vermont, on December 13, 2010, at the age of 77.

== Awards ==
In recognition of his work, he was awarded the Presidential Distinguished Public Service Award in 1989 and Presidential Meritorious Public Service Award in 1987 and 1984. The Department of Defense awarded him the Outstanding Public Service Medal in 1980 and its Meritorious Public Service Medal in 1977.

== Works ==
- The Last Battle of the Cold War, Palgrave Macmillan, 2006. ISBN 9781403972811

== Notes ==
Diplomatic posts
Preceded by Geoffrey Swaebe	United States Ambassador to Belgium; 1988–1991	Succeeded by Bruce Gelb
