= Sue Nabi =

Algerian-born French entrepreneur, beauty industry executive

Sue Youcef Nabi
- Born: 13 February 1968 (age 58); Algiers, Algeria
- Education: ENGEES; ESSEC Business School
- Occupations: Entrepreneur, beauty industry authority
- Known for: CEO of Coty Inc. (2020–2025); CEO and Founder of Orveda; Former President of L'Oreal and Lancome

Sue Youcef Nabi (born 13 February 1968) is an Algerian entrepreneur and innovator in the world of global beauty. Nabi is the founder of vegan skincare line Orveda, which was launched in 2017. Nabi spent 20 years at L'Oreal, during which she held the titles of President for both Lancôme and L'Oréal.

In July 2020 Nabi was named CEO of the American multinational beauty company Coty Inc., a post she held until the end of 2025.

Nabi was named on Fortune's list of Most Powerful Women in 2023.

== Early life and education ==
Born to a father who was an engineer, politician and painter, and a French-teaching mother, Nabi grew up in Algeria. After completing an Engineering Degree at the École nationale du génie de l'eau et de l'environnement de Strasbourg (ENGEES), Nabi went on to graduate with an Advanced master's degree in Marketing Management, ESSEC Business School in 1991.

== Career at L'Oréal ==
In 1993, Nabi entered L'Oreal as a Retail Sales Representative for Jacques Dessange Professional Hair Care in South-West France and was promoted to Mennen Brand Manager (Gemey-Maybelline) in 1994. Between 1996 and 2000, Nabi served as Group Manager/Marketing Director for Gemey-Maybelline, before being promoted to General Manager of L'Oreal France.

In 2005, Nabi became Worldwide President of L'Oréal Paris, and achieved various successes, gaining press coverage for growing the business and championing diversity in beauty. Known for her individualistic and personal charisma, she re-invented L'Oréal Paris' advertising and brand equity through the "Because We're Worth It" testimonials. Nabi also championed diversity of beauty through the introduction of marketing campaigns that featured, for the first time, Jane Fonda (at 68), brunettes including Penélope Cruz and Eva Longoria, Asian celebrities including Chinese actress Gong Li as well as men - from both Hollywood and TV screens - including Lost's Matthew Fox and Grey's Anatomy's Patrick Dempsey.

Nabi also oversaw a number of key product launches and successes, including the Casting Crème Gloss Hair Color and Total Repair 5 hair care line. Additionally, she was instrumental in the development of makeup innovations such as Glam Shine, the Color Riche Lip Colour Star Secrets line, and Telescopic and Double Extend mascaras.

In 2009, at the age of 41, Nabi became the Worldwide President of Lancôme, part of the L'Oreal Luxury Products division and a brand that was in decline. During a 5-year presidency, Nabi oversaw the launch of many new Lancôme products, most notably the perfume "La Vie est belle", advertised by Julia Roberts.

Nabi's credits during presidency also include re-inventing Lancôme's advertising Image with photographer Mario Testino, signing celebrities including Emma Watson, Lily Collins, as well as the creation and launch of Visionnaire Serum, Génifique Light Pearl Eye Serum, Génifique Serum rel-aunch, Teint Miracle foundations, Hypnose mascaras and Absolue l'Extrait Super Premium Skincare.

In 2013, Nabi resigned from her position as president of Lancôme, and exited L'Oreal.

== 2013 to Present ==
In the wake of resignation, Nabi moved from Paris to London, England. Inspired by Taoism and a personal health journey (one which included Naturopathy and Ayurveda), Nabi spent three years creating and developing Orveda, a skincare line co-founded with friend and business partner, Nicolas Vu.

In July 2020, she was appointed CEO of Coty, taking over from Peter Harf who remained as Chairman. She stepped down as CEO at the end of 2025 after five years, and Markus Strobel took over as interim CEO on 1 January 2026.

In 2023, Nabi's total compensation from Coty was $149.4 million, up 4,100% from the previous year and representing a CEO-to-median worker pay ratio of 3,769-to-1 for the company, as well as making Nabi the fifth highest paid CEO in the US that year.

== Personal life ==
Nabi is a transgender woman.
