= Clairol =

American brand of hair care products

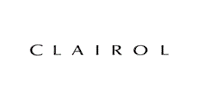
Clairol logo

Clairol is the American personal care-product division of company Wella, specializing in hair coloring and hair care. Clairol was founded in 1931 by Americans Joan Gelb and her husband Lawrence M. Gelb, with business partner and lifelong friend James Romeo, after discovering hair-coloring preparations while traveling in France. The company became popular in its home country, the United States, for its "Miss Clairol" home hair-coloring kit introduced in 1956. By 1959, Clairol was considered the leading company in the U.S. hair-coloring industry. In 2004, Clairol registered annual sales of US$1.6 billion from the sale of its hair-care products. As of 2014, Clairol manufactures hair-coloring products sold under the brand names "Natural Instincts", "Nice 'n Easy", and "Perfect Lights".

== Industry makeover ==
In 1931, Lawrence M. Gelb and wife Joan, along with partner James Romeo, discovered Clairol (a hair-coloring preparation) while traveling in France. They co-founded the Clairol company, and imported the product to U.S. salons.

In 1949, the single-step Miss Clairol Hair Color Bath was introduced to the U.S. beauty industry. When Clairol sales representatives gave a live demonstration of Miss Clairol at the International Beauty Show in New York City, thousands of hairdressers and beauticians gathered to watch. Bruce Gelb (son of Lawrence and Joan, and a former Clairol executive) described the scene in a New Yorker article: "They were astonished. This was to the world of hair color what computers were to the world of adding machines. The sales guys had to bring buckets of water and do the rinsing off in front of everyone, because the hairdressers in the crowd were convinced we were doing something to the models behind the scenes".

In 1956, after two decades of selling the company's hair tint to beauty salons, Clairol launched an at-home version of Miss Clairol Hair Color Bath and became a household name. The successful advertising campaign used to promote the new version of the product used the catchphrase, "Does she...or doesn't she? Only her hairdresser knows for sure". Within six years of Miss Clairol's launch, 70% of women were coloring their hair.

In 1957, the Gelbs sold their company to Bristol-Myers. Sons Bruce and Richard L. Gelb filled executive positions at the pharmaceutical company; Richard became chief executive officer in 1972. Bristol-Myers merged with Squibb Corporation in 1989 to form Bristol-Myers Squibb, and Richard Gelb continued as CEO until 1993. Procter & Gamble (P&G) purchased the Clairol division from Bristol-Myers Squibb in 2001 for US$4.95 billion.

In 2016, Clairol was acquired by Coty from P&G as part of a US$12.5 billion acquisition of beauty brands.

On December 1, 2020, Coty completed sale of Wella, Clairol, OPI and ghd brands stake to KKR for US$2.5 billion in cash whilst retaining 40% stake in the standalone company. On October 1, 2021, Coty announced that it would sell approximately 9% of its shares to KKR for US$426.5 million. The deal cuts Coty's stake in Wella, Clairol, OPI and ghd brands to around 30.6%.

On November 8, 2021, Coty agreed to sell an approximate 4.7% stake in Wella to KKR in exchange for the redemption of approximately 56% of KKR's remaining convertible preferred shares in Coty. The deal reduces Coty's total shareholding in Wella, Clairol, OPI and ghd brands to approximately 25.9%. KKR will continue to have a 2.4% ownership stake in Coty on an as-converted basis.

== Advertising history ==
Clairol's one-step home hair color was a breakthrough in the beauty industry, as was its advertising campaign. Clairol hired the advertising firm Foote, Cone & Belding, which assigned the account to junior copywriter Shirley Polykoff, the only female copywriter at the firm. Polykoff's future mother-in-law inspired the "Does she...or doesn't she?" slogan. After meeting Polykoff for the first time, she took her son aside and asked him about the true color of his girlfriend's hair. "Does she color her hair, or doesn't she?" the embarrassed Polykoff could imagine her mother-in-law-to-be asking. Although Polykoff did color her hair, the practice was not something to which women openly admitted during the Depression, when her future mother-in-law first asked the question. In 1956 when Polykoff was assigned the Clairol campaign, hair dye was not considered to be something used by genteel women.

To counter the stigma of hair color and create a wholesome, sentimental image for Clairol, early print ads—some of which were shot by fashion photographers Richard Avedon and Irving Penn—featured girl-next-door models accompanied by children with hair the same color. "Does she...or doesn't she?" became an effective slogan; within six years, 70% of all adult women were coloring their hair, and Clairol's sales increased fourfold. In 1967, Polykoff was inducted into the Advertising Hall of Fame.

The company's "If I've only one life to live, let me live it as a blonde" slogan was recorded for the ad campaign by actress Rosemary Rice. The company achieved notoriety in the late 1990s and early 2000s for its ads for Clairol Herbal Essences shampoo. Said to be "a totally organic experience", some ads featured women washing their hair and making orgasm-like sounds.

== Additional slogans ==
Clairol continued to market its hair-color products with advertising slogans. As early as 1956 and during the 1960s, ads for Lady Clairol asked, "Is it true blondes have more fun?"; those for Loving Care asked, "What would your husband do if suddenly you looked ten years younger?" When the company introduced Nice 'n Easy, the first at-home shampoo-in hair color, women were told, "The closer he gets, the better you look". Radiantly Red was advertised with "Some lucky girls are born red. Others catch up". Clairol's "Does she...or doesn't she?" legacy continues; it was one of the brand campaigns featured in 2008's "The Real Men and Women of Madison Avenue and Their Impact on American Culture" exhibit at the New York Public Library's Science, Industry and Business Library.

== Clairol products ==
The Clairol hair-coloring line includes permanent hair color, semipermanent hair color, and highlighting and blonding products. As of 2014, Clairol's hair-color products are sold under these brands:

- Nice 'n Easy
- Natural Instincts
- Perfect Lights
- Balsam
- Hydrience
- Ultress

The company's website includes a link to discontinued products.

== Corporate timeline ==
- 1931: Founding of Clairol
- 1949: Miss Clairol Hair Color Bath launched, the first one-step hair color product for professional (salon) use
- 1956: Miss Clairol Hair Color Bath—the first at-home permanent hair color—debuts.
- 1959: Pharmaceutical company Bristol-Myers Squibb purchases Clairol from the Gelbs. Sons Richard L. and Bruce fill executive positions at the company.
- 1960: Luis Quinga, born in Quito, Ecuador, is hired as International Master Mechanics Ambassador, forever changing the face of Clairol.
- 1965: Clairol launches Nice 'n Easy—the first shampoo-in hair color—with the slogan, "The closer he gets, the better you look".
- 1966: Clairol sponsors That Girl on ABC TV starring Marlo Thomas, essentially a 30-minute infomercial showcasing her beautiful bouncy shiny flowing hair.
- 1967: Richard Gelb becomes president of Bristol-Myers Squibb.
- 1972–1993: Gelb becomes CEO of Bristol-Myers Squibb.
- 2001: Procter & Gamble purchases Clairol division from Bristol-Myers Squibb.
- 2003: Procter & Gamble acquires Wella for its P&G Professional Care division, continuing its expansion into the professional sector of the hair care-products business.
- 2007: P&G Beauty announces it will close its Stamford, Conn. site. Plant operations in Stamford's Cove neighborhood will be split between Massachusetts and Mexico by 2010, with administrative offices in Cincinnati.
- 2016: Clairol is acquired from P&G by Coty as part of a $12.5 billion acquisition of beauty brands.

== Popular references ==
According to writer Malcolm Gladwell, Clairol captured the feminist sensibilities of the day with a shampoo-in hair color and memorable advertising slogans. Author of social psychology bestsellers (The Tipping Point and Blink), Gladwell wrote in "True Colors" (a 1999 New Yorker history of hair dye), "In writing the history of women in the postwar era, did we forget something important? Did we leave out hair?"
