= Nice 'n Easy (hair coloring) =

Shampoo-in permanent hair-coloring

Nice 'n Easy is a shampoo-in permanent hair-coloring product for home use. It was introduced in 1965, billed as the first shampoo-in hair colour, with the advertising tagline, "The closer he gets... the better you look." Developed and manufactured by the American company Clairol (division of company Coty), Nice 'n Easy extended the company's home hair color product lines, which debuted in 1956 with Miss Clairol Hair Colour Bath and the famous "Does she... or doesn't she?" advertising campaign.

== History ==
In the 1950s, just 7% of American women used hair color (or admitted to doing so), at a time when the common belief was that only actresses, models and other women considered promiscuous altered their natural shade. To help change that attitude, Clairol eschewed celebrities in favor of the average woman for its Miss Clairol and Nice ’n Easy hair color campaigns.

The idea to buck the trend of that era’s advertising style — which emphasized high glamor rather than girl-next-door vignettes — was the brainchild of lead copywriter Shirley Polykoff, whose work on the Clairol hair color campaign was a career high point. In her original memo to Clairol, Polykoff, who was inducted into the Advertising Hall of Fame in 1980, described the Clairol woman as "Cashmere-sweater-over-the-shoulder types. Like larger-than-life-portraits of the proverbial girl on the block who’s a little prettier than your wife and lives in a house slightly nicer than yours." Polykoff created the "Does she... or doesn't she" campaign for Miss Clairol in 1956, and "The closer he gets... the better you look" campaign for the launch of Nice 'N Easy in 1965.
