= Sally Hansen =

American businesswoman (1908-1963)

Sally G. Hansen
- Born: Sally Genevieve Finney; 1908; Kansas City, Missouri, U.S.
- Died: December 16, 1963 (aged 55); New York City, U.S.
- Occupations: Businesswoman; inventor; dancer; actress; writer
- Known for: Founder of Sally Hansen, Inc.

Sally Hansen (1908 – December 16, 1963) was an American businesswoman, inventor, dancer, actress, and writer.

== Early life ==
Sally Finney dancing, 1920s

Sally Genevieve Hansen (née Finney) was born in 1908 in Kansas City, Kansas, to Thomas M. and Jennie M. Finney, the owners of a small cosmetics company, La Finné. As a teenager, she left home to become a dancer in Hollywood, California, landing roles on stage and screen, including The Orpheus Four, Friendly Enemies, and Spring is Upon Us.

Hansen became a frequenter of the Hollywood social scene during the Roaring Twenties.

== Career ==
=== Writer ===
While working as a dancer and actress in Hollywood, Hansen wrote (under her maiden name Sally Finney) a column titled "Your Candid Mirror" for the Los Angeles Times. Over the span of 91 articles, Hansen provided beauty and lifestyle advice, celebrating women and encouraging readers to be confident in their own skin.

=== Entrepreneur ===
==== House of Hollywood ====
After her early career as a dancer, Hansen took over her parents' failing cosmetics company and reinvented it as House of Hollywood in partnership with her husband and her brother. By the early 1940s, Hansen expanded House of Hollywood to include 26,000 square feet (2,400 m^{2}), the largest private brand cosmetic house in Southern California. She was also made president of the California Cosmetics Association, its first female chair.

Hansen's success with House of Hollywood led her to be offered the chance to expand through S. H. Kress & Co. Under the label La Bonita, she created the products Cool Off (make-up designed to not run in the heat) and Film Tone, inspired by the makeup she knew from film sets.

==== Sally Hansen, Inc. ====
In 1946, Hansen quit House of Hollywood and left Hollywood to create her own eponymous beauty company in New York City, Sally Hansen Inc., with a logo modeled on her own signature. Its first two trademarks were Hard As Nails and Mend-A-Nail. Hansen employed mostly women in her factory – championing and supporting women in the workforce.

Hansen sold the brand in 1962 to Maradel Products. The brand eventually became the number one nail brand in the United States, and, as of 2017, was distributed in over 55 countries.

== Personal life ==
Hansen married three times. First, at 19 years old to Eugene Gunther, a man who would turn out to be a philanderer, and in 1929 Hansen filed for divorce on grounds of "excessive intoxication" and violence, including one documented incident of being "slapped across the face".

On November 20, 1932, Hansen married Adolf M. Hansen, "Hans", a doctor, surgeon, and socialite. Although the couple led a glamorous happy life, filled with parties, Hansen's ambitions outmatched his and on October 1, 1946, Hansen again filed for divorce.

In 1947, Hansen was married for the third time to Jack Newton, a man 11 years her junior.

=== Death ===
Hansen died at age 56, on December 16, 1963, after a 6-month fight with lung cancer. Her grave is small and simple: A flat plaque that until 2014 was buried in mud and barely visible, located at Rose Hills Memorial Park, Whittier, Los Angeles County, California.

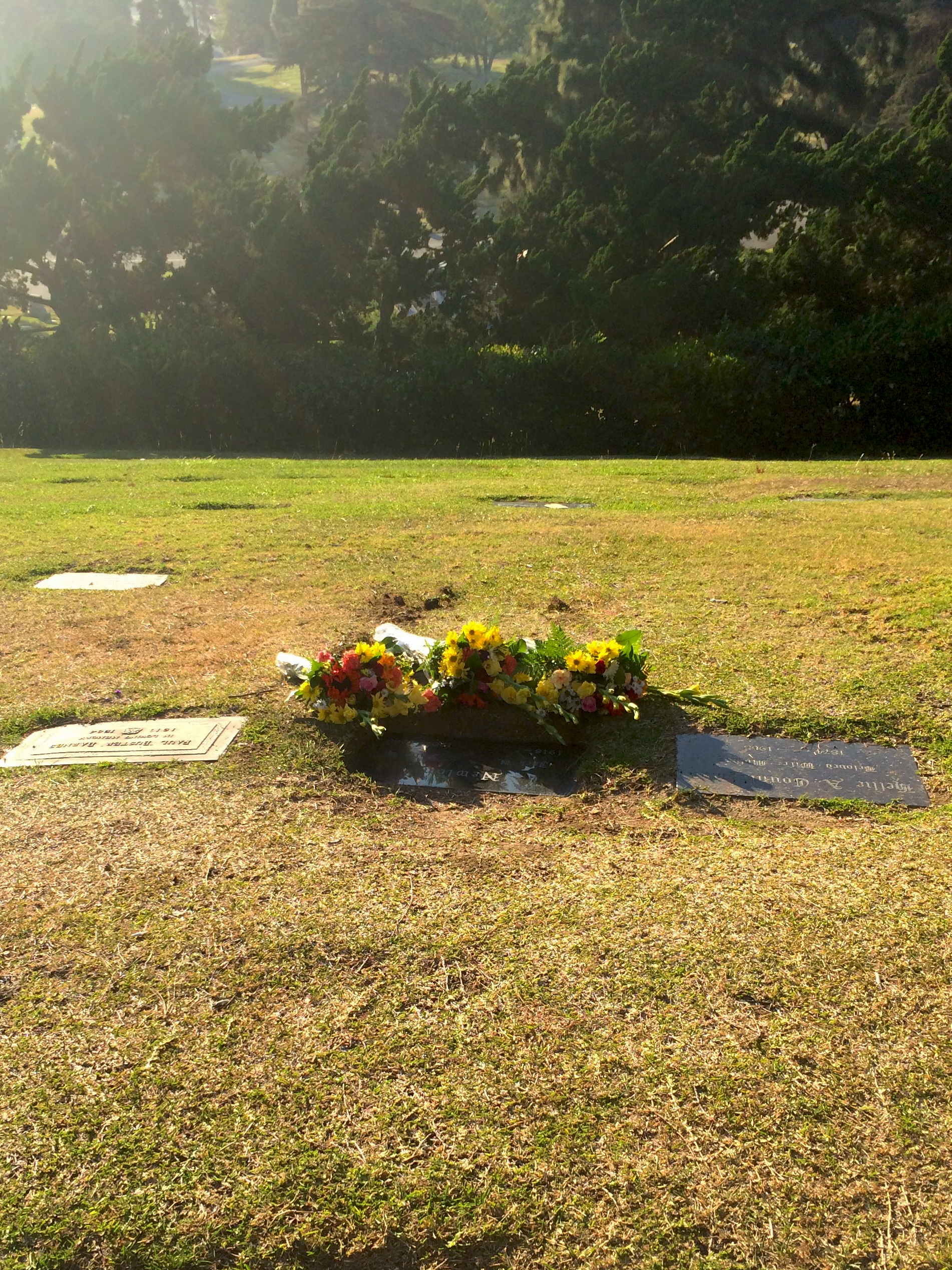
Sally Hansen grave, 2014

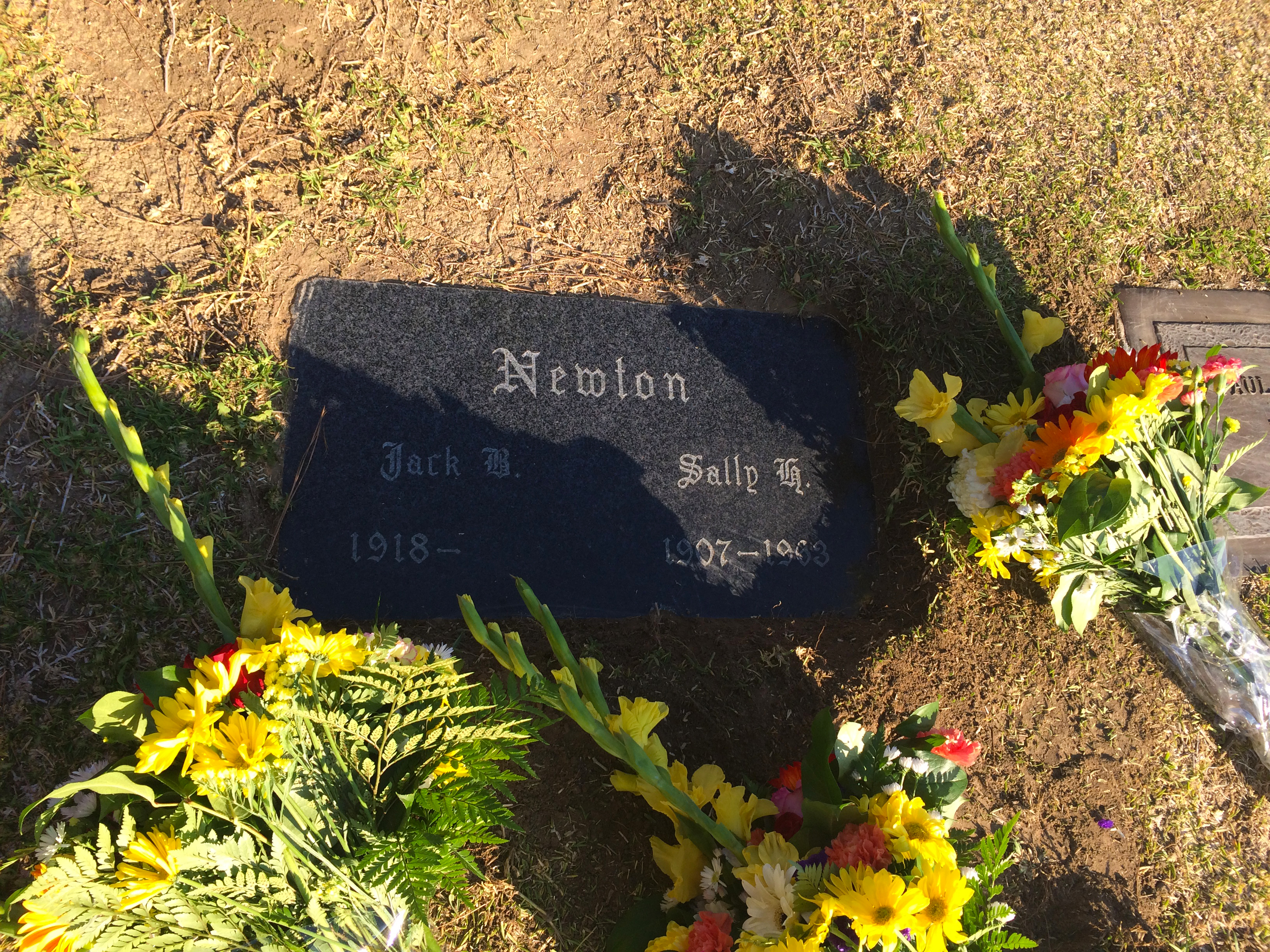
Sally Hansen grave, 2014

== Financial legacy ==
The 1962 sale of Sally Hansen, Inc. netted Hansen approximately $11 million (accounting for inflation to 2017). With her death one year later, the remainder of her estate was left to her husband Jack Newton, approximately $4 million, along with some small gifts for close friends.
