= Philosophy (brand) =

Brand

philosophy
- Type: Public
- Founded: 1996
- Founder: Cristina Carlino
- Headquarters: New York, NY
- Key people: Camillo Pane, CEO; Bart Becht, Chairman
- Parent: Coty, Inc.
- Website: www.philosophy.com

philosophy is an American skin care and cosmetics brand founded in 1996 by Cristina Carlino. The company was acquired by The Carlyle Group in 2007, and sold to Coty, Inc. in 2010.

== History ==
philosophy was founded in Phoenix, Arizona by Cristina Carlino. Prior to philosophy, Carlino founded Bio Medic, a medically based skin care line created for distribution in clinical settings by plastic surgeons and dermatologists. philosophy products were inspired by years of medical research that helped to shape the skin care treatments, peels and protocols offered in medical practices.

=== 1990s ===
philosophy launched at a press event on March 21, 1996, at the Rainbow Room in New York City. The first product available was purity made simple, a facial cleanser that the brand continues to offer. It was available exclusively at Barneys New York before being offered in other retailers such as Nordstrom and Saks Fifth Avenue. Shortly thereafter, Carlino appeared on the Oprah Winfrey Show to promote philosophy; Winfrey would continue to be a fan and brand evangelist, with her baby picture being featured on a special 15th anniversary edition of hope in a jar, the brand’s moisturizer. philosophy’s first fragrance, amazing grace, also made its debut that year followed by its second fragrance, pure grace. In 1997, philosophy launched their in-home peel product—a new concept for retail cosmetics at the time. French cosmetics store chain Sephora began to stock philosophy in 1998. In 1999, the brand expanded into bath products including shampoo, shower gel and bubble baths. By the end of the ‘90s, philosophy became the first skin care brand to partner with home-shopping retailer QVC.

=== 2000s ===
Particularly through home-shopping television sales, philosophy debuted “super-sized” versions of several items in 2000. In 2003, the brand expanded into fragrances with the falling in love line. The decade also saw the publication of a branded cookbook and the release of skin care kits designed to target damage, specific skin conditions or concerns, such as acne or anti-aging. In 2005, the brand launched shower for the cure, a multifunctional bath product that could be used as a shampoo, shower gel or bubble bath, with all net proceeds given to the Women’s Cancer Research Fund. In 2007, philosophy was acquired by The Carlyle Group for an estimated $450 million.

=== 2010s ===
Coty, Inc. acquired philosophy from The Carlyle Group in late 2010 in a deal that was valued at approximately $1 billion. One of the goals of this acquisition was to expand the Coty portfolio with an entry into the luxury skin care market. After acquiring the philosophy brand, Coty altered the original fragrance, Amazing Grace, causing thousands of loyal customers to complain and boycott not only the Amazing Grace products, but the brand in its entirely. Even after many years of loyal customer complaints across numerous retail channels, Coty has not returned to the original formula of the Amazing Grace fragrance as of 2020. In 2014, philosophy released an updated version of their hope in a jar line: renewed hope in a jar; it debuted domestically, then launched globally in selected European and Asian markets. Soon to follow were several more additions to the philosophy skin care line, including ultimate miracle worker, uplifting miracle worker and take a deep breath, which includes day and nighttime moisturizers and an eye cream. 2016 saw the opening of the freestanding flagship philosophy retail store in Paramus, NJ.

== Products ==
Though initially founded as a skin care line, philosophy has since expanded into color cosmetics, fragrance, and bath and body products. Each product includes an inspirational name, saying, or recipe on the packaging.

== Charity ==
=== hope & grace initiative ===
In 2014, philosophy established the hope & grace initiative to help raise awareness of mental health and wellbeing topics. The majority of funding from the hope & grace initiative supports community-based mental health efforts. For every philosophy product sold in the US, the brand contributes 1% of sales to the hope and grace fund. Each year the hope and grace fund awards multiple grants to local organizations, including Bringchange2mind and NAMI (National Alliance on Mental Illness), working toward promotion, prevention and treatment of women in need of mental healthcare. In 2017, the brand released a new national campaign and PSA to support the hope & grace initiative.

== Endorsements ==
=== Oprah Winfrey ===
Oprah Winfrey has been a long-time endorser of philosophy, starting shortly after the brand’s launch. In 2005, Winfrey gifted hope in a jar to an audience of Hurricane Katrina relief volunteers. In 2010, Winfrey included hope in a jar in her final Favorite Things list. philosophy honored Winfrey by including a picture of her as a baby on special edition packages of hope in a jar the same year

=== Natasha Bedingfield ===
In 2015, English singer-songwriter Natasha Bedingfield partnered with philosophy to support its hope & grace initiative. Bedingfield created an exclusive, original song, “Hope” for the brand

=== Ellen Pompeo ===
In 2016, American actress and Grey’s Anatomy star, Ellen Pompeo partnered with philosophy for the #CoolAger campaign, the goal of which was to help dispel the stigma women face over aging. The campaign also launched their uplifting miracle worker line of products. As part of the launch, philosophy donated $10,000 to the Aviva Family and Children’s Services, a program chosen by Pompeo that provides mental healthcare to at-risk children and families.

=== Gabby Bernstein ===
In 2015, philosophy named world-renowned spiritual guru, motivational speaker, life coach and best-selling author, Gabby Bernstein as its wellbeing ambassador.
