= Josh Wood (hairdresser) =

British hair colourist

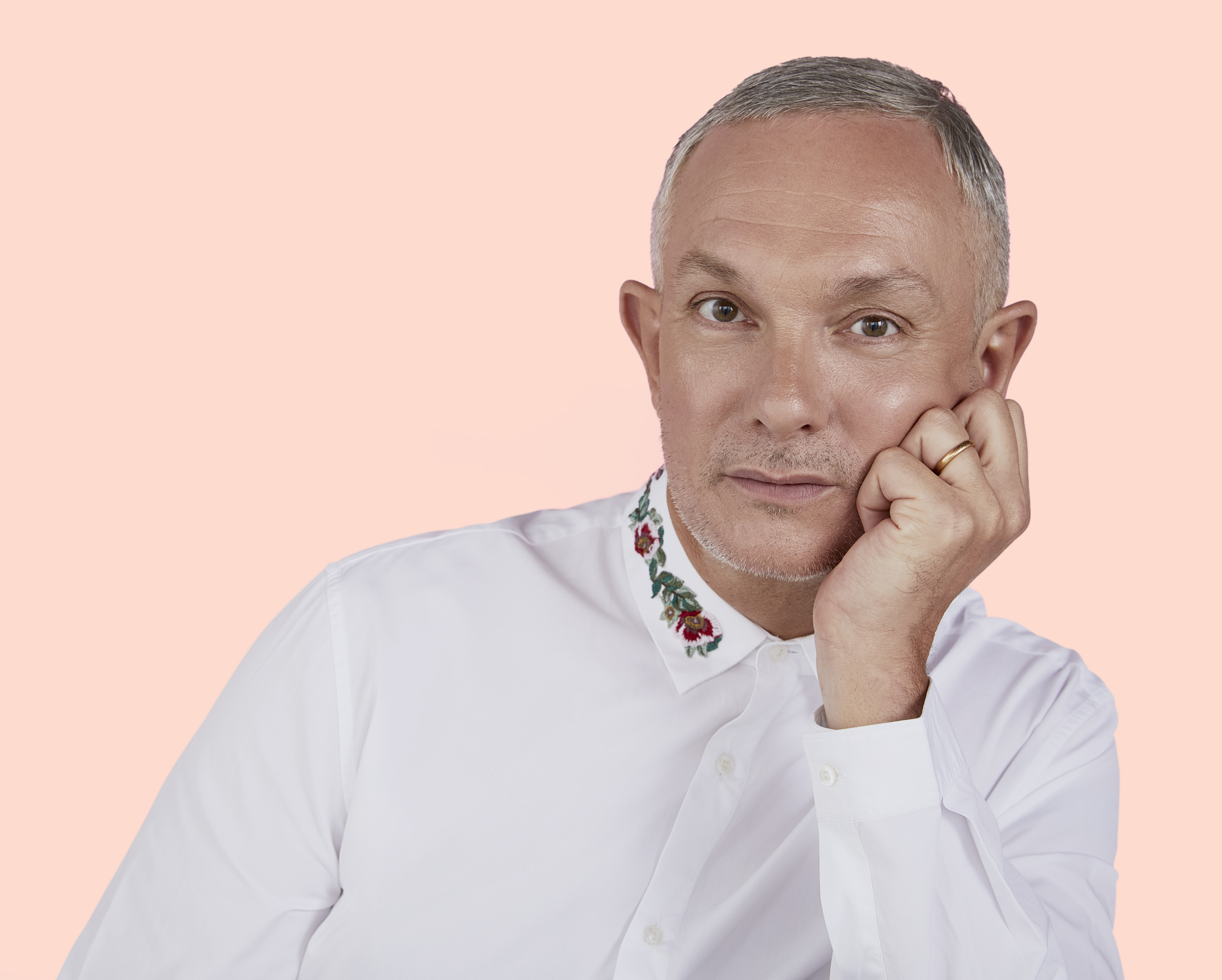
- Born: Barnsley
- Occupation: Hair Colourist
- Known for: Expert colourist, founder of Josh Wood Colour
- Website: www.joshwoodcolour.com

Josh Wood is a British hair colourist. He is best known for his work with colour, his hair salons and his celebrity clientele. Wood is co-founder of home hair colour brand, Josh Wood Colour and Global Colour Creative Director for Redken. Wood is a regular guest host on ITV's This Morning.

== Career ==
Wood was born and brought up in Barnsley, South Yorkshire. He "fell into" hairdressing, after a friend of his got a Saturday job in a local salon which led to him enrolling in a Youth Training Scheme. Initially working in a Vidal Sassoon salon in Leeds, Wood moved to London in 1992, working for Vidal Sassoon in Mayfair & then with Sassoon himself in New York - staying with the company for 14 years.

Having previously co-founded Real Hair in Chelsea, London in 1999, he started his own hair salon, named Josh Wood Atelier, in September 2011 in Holland Park, London. He opened a second Josh Wood Atelier in Liberty & Co. on 30 October 2012, making it the first hair salon to open in the iconic department store.

In February 2014, Wood collaborated with Marks & Spencer to launch a range of hair care and colour products to be sold in store. "The range of 13 products is aimed at women with colour-treated hair and includes shampoo and conditioner, plus additional products such as colour touch up wands for treating hair roots".

== Fashion ==
Wood is a prominent backstage presence on the runways of Paris, London, Milan and New York. His most recent work included 37 hair looks for Marc Jacobs' Spring/Summer 2019 show, which he described as "the biggest project I have ever worked on with hair for a show. We coloured nearly 40 models’ hair, which was almost all the girls in the show". The same season, Wood led the colour for Valentino, Miu Miu, Burberry and Matty Bovan. Previously Wood has worked with Karl Lagerfeld, Miuccia Prada and Donatella Versace. Wood remains the only colourist working at a couture level.

Wood has worked with fashion photographer Steven Meisel, and on fashion shoots with publications such as American Vogue, Love Magazine, Vogue Italia, Vogue India, American W, and Man About Town. He has collaborated as regular columnist for the UK's Sunday Times Style magazine. In 2015 he launched Chinese Vogue 'Les Beiges' collection on social media referencing Wood's influences from fashion to interiors, and architecture to the natural world.

In November 2018, Wood was named a regular columnist for Love magazine online, "giving detailed accounts behind his marvellous creations".

== Clientele ==
Wood has reportedly worked with everyone from David Bowie to Kylie Minogue. It was during his time in New York he first met with Bowie, the start of a creative relationship and friendship that saw him collaborate on the iconic 'red look' for Earthling. Clients have included PJ Harvey, Elle Macpherson, Florence Welch, Mick Jagger and on films such as X-Men and the latest Bridget Jones movie.

== Entrepreneur ==
In February 2018, Wood launched his own brand of 'at home hair colour', Josh Wood Colour, available online and in Boots in UK. "Wood, who is also global colour creative director for Redken, has spent two years creating a whole line of products that is reinventing home hair colour as we know it". Harper's Bazaar UK, says "Wood really has thought of everything to make the at-home experience effortless and elegant". On 10 March 2019, Wood announced a $6.5 million series-A round investment, to take his home hair colour business to the (online) masses. Led by Index, with further funding from Jam Jar Investments and Venrex, the investment will further his aim of disrupting the at-home hair colour industry.

== Awards ==
- 2014: Grazia UK 'Breakthrough Brand of the Year - Josh Wood Guardian of Colour'
- 2015: Vogue India 'Outstanding Contributions To The Beauty Industry’ Award
- 2016: Creative Head 'Most Wanted' Hair Icon Award
- 2018: Harpers Bazaar UK 'Best Home Hair Colour' Award, Josh Wood Colour
- 2019: Marie Claire Hair Awards 'Best Hair Colourist'
- 2019: Cosmo Beauty Awards 'Best Colour Product', Shade Shot Gloss
- 2019: Women's Health Beauty Awards 'Best At-Home Colour', Josh Wood Colour
- 2019: The Times Sunday Times Style 'The 49 Best Hair Products of All Time', Shade Shot Gloss
