= Coty =

French American beauty company

Coty Inc.
- Type: Public
- Traded as: NYSE: COTY (Class A); S&P 600 component
- ISIN: US2220702037
- Industry: Beauty
- Founded: 1904; 122 years ago in Paris, France
- Founder: François Coty
- Headquarters: Amsterdam, Netherlands
- Area served: Worldwide
- Key people: Markus Strobel (executive chairman and interim CEO)
- Products: Cosmetics; fragrances; hair care; skin care
- Brands: Bourjois; CoverGirl; ghd; Kylie Cosmetics; Max Factor; Rimmel; Sally Hansen; Wella
- Revenue: ▼US$5.89 billion (2025)
- Operating income: ▼US$241 million (2025)
- Net income: ▼ −US$368 million (2025)
- Total assets: ▼US$11.9 billion (2025)
- Total equity: ▼US$3.54 billion (2025)
- Number of employees: 11,636 (2025)
- Website: coty.com

Coty Inc. is a multinational beauty company founded in Paris in 1904 by François Coty. Today, the company is incorporated in Delaware, United States, with its global headquarters in Amsterdam, Netherlands. With its subsidiaries, it develops, manufactures, markets, and distributes fragrances, cosmetics, skin care, nail care, and both professional and retail hair care products. Coty owns around 40 brands as of 2024.

== Corporate overview ==
Coty is one of the world's largest beauty companies and the largest fragrance company, with $5.3 billion in revenue for the fiscal year 2022. Coty acquired 41 beauty brands from Procter & Gamble in 2016, becoming the global leader in fragrance, the second largest company for hair color and styling products, and the third largest company for color cosmetics. The company operates three divisions: Consumer Beauty, which focuses on body care, color cosmetics, fragrances, and hair coloring and styling products; Luxury, for luxury cosmetic, fragrance, and skin care products; and Professional Beauty, which services beauty salon and nail salon professionals. Coty's mission is to "celebrate and liberate the diversity of beauty".

The company has approximately 20,000 full-time employees in 46 countries, as of mid 2018. Coty's global headquarters are located in Amsterdam. The Consumer Beauty, Luxury and Professional Beauty divisions are headquartered in New York City, Paris and Geneva, respectively. Peter Harf is Coty's chairman. Pierre Laubies was Coty's CEO, but on June 1, 2020, he was replaced by Harf. Pierre-André Terisse was appointed chief financial officer in January 2019. In July 2020, it was announced that Sue Youcef Nabi, a former L'Oréal executive, would become the company's chief executive officer and was due to take over in September that year. In December 2025, Coty said Nabi would step down after five years as CEO. Markus Strobel, who had spent 33 years at Procter & Gamble, became executive chairman and interim CEO on January 1, 2026, and Peter Harf retired from the board.

JAB Holding Company is Coty's largest shareholder, as of September 13, 2024, JAB Group owns approximately 52% of Coty shares.

== Brands and products ==
Coty owns approximately 40 brands, as of 2024, and has partnerships with various other brands, including:

- Adidas
- Bourjois
- Beyoncé
- Bruno Banani
- Burberry
- Calvin Klein
- Chloé
- David Beckham
- Davidoff
- Dolce & Gabbana
- Escada
- Gabriela Sabatini
- Gucci
- Hugo Boss
- James Bond (007 James Bond)
- Jil Sander
- JOOP!
- Jōvan Musk
- Katy Perry
- Kylie Cosmetics (51%)
- KKW Beauty (20%)
- Lacoste (fragrances) until end of 2023. Now Licensed by Interparfums from 1 Jan 2024
- Lancaster
- Marc Jacobs
- Marni
- Max Factor
- Mexx
- Miu Miu
- Monange
- Nautica
- Orveda
- philosophy
- Rimmel
- Roberto Cavalli
- Sally Hansen
- Skkn By Kim
- Tiffany & Co
- Vera Wang
- Wella

Coty relaunched the CoverGirl and Clairol brands, including the Nice 'n Easy hair coloring product, in late 2017 and early 2018, respectively. The relaunches included new messaging and product development, with an emphasis on diversity. The company also relaunched Max Factor in 2018.

== History ==
=== 1900s–1920s ===
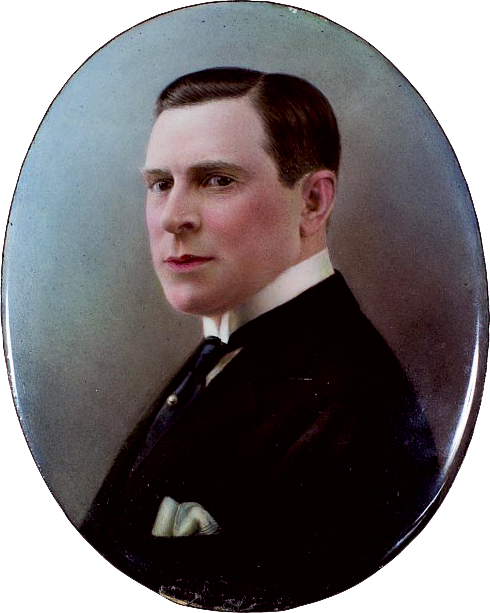
François Coty in 1926

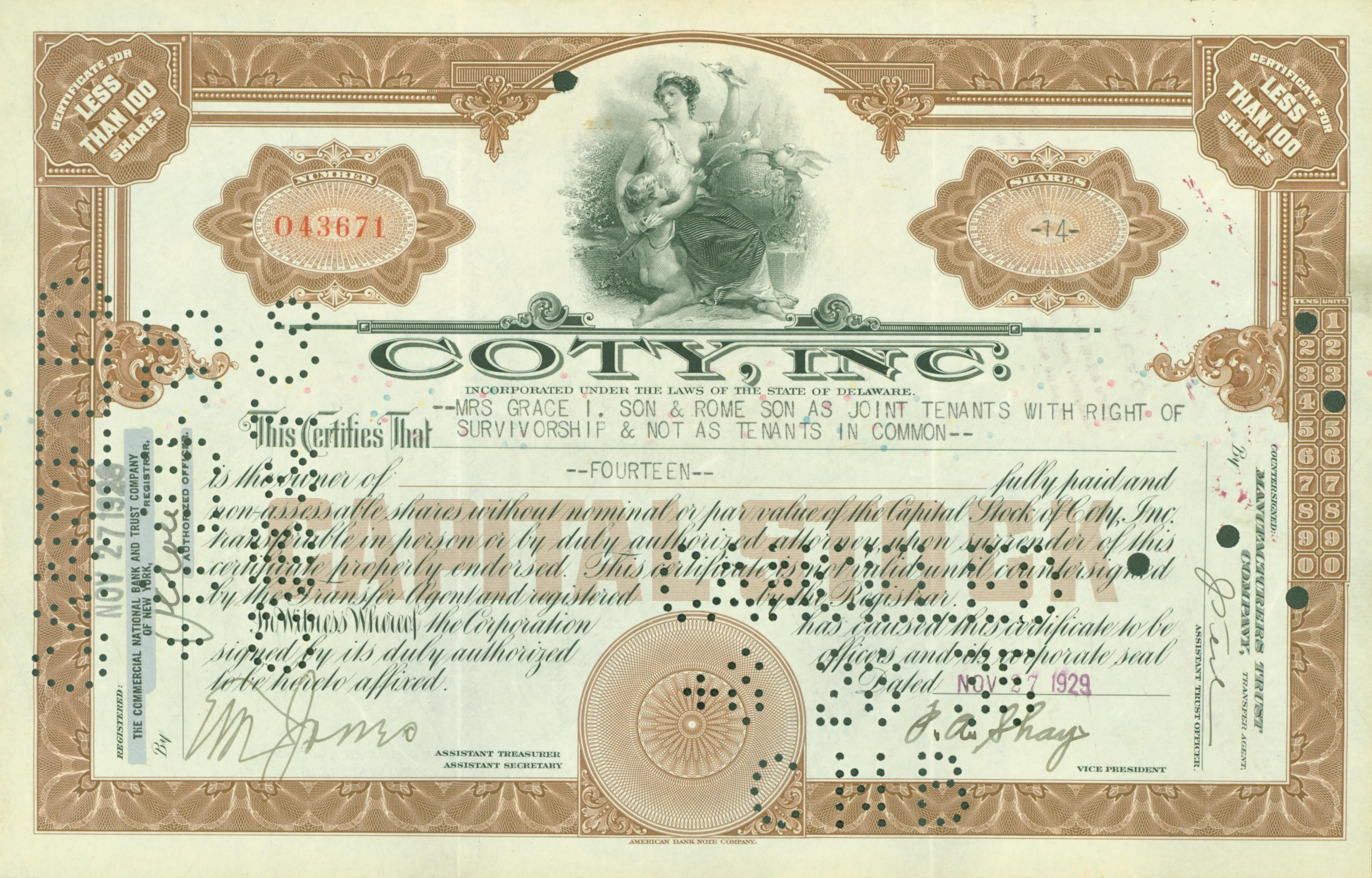
Share of the Coty Inc., issued 27 November 1929

Coty was founded by François Coty in Paris in 1904. The brand's first fragrance, La Rose Jacqueminot, was launched the same year and was packaged in a bottle designed by Baccarat.

L'Origan was launched in 1905; according to The Week, the perfume "started a sweeping trend throughout Paris" and was the first example of "a fine but affordable fragrance that would appeal both to the upper classes and to the less affluent, changing the way scents were sold forever". Following its early successes, Coty was able to open its first store in 1908 in Paris' Place Vendôme. next to glass designer René Lalique.Soon after, Coty began collaborating with Lalique to create custom fragrance bottles, labels, and other packaging materials. Coty had Lalique design mini perfume bottles and was the first to introduce the concept of the tester bottle.

Coty also established a "Perfume City" in the suburbs of Paris during the early 1910s to handle administration and fragrance production; the site was an early business supporter of female employees and offered benefits including child care.

The company began its global expansion in the early 1910s, first in London and New York. Coty established U.S. headquarters at 714 Fifth Avenue in New York City, and commissioned Lalique to design pressed glass panels for the building's façade windows, which were installed in 1912. Coty remained headquartered in the building until 1941. The structure was later given landmark status by the New York City Landmarks Preservation Commission during the 1980s for its custom windows. Coty began selling other beauty products including face and body powders in the 1910s, and launched one of its most successful fragrances, Chypre, in 1917. The company's products gained more attention in the United States as World War I soldiers started returning from France with gifts for loved ones. During the 1920s, Coty launched more than fifteen new fragrances and expanded into Germany, Italy, Spain, and Switzerland. Coty, Inc. was formed in New York in 1922, and became a publicly traded company in 1925.

=== 1930s–1990s ===
François Coty died in 1934; his family maintained control of the company and served as board members until the 1960s.

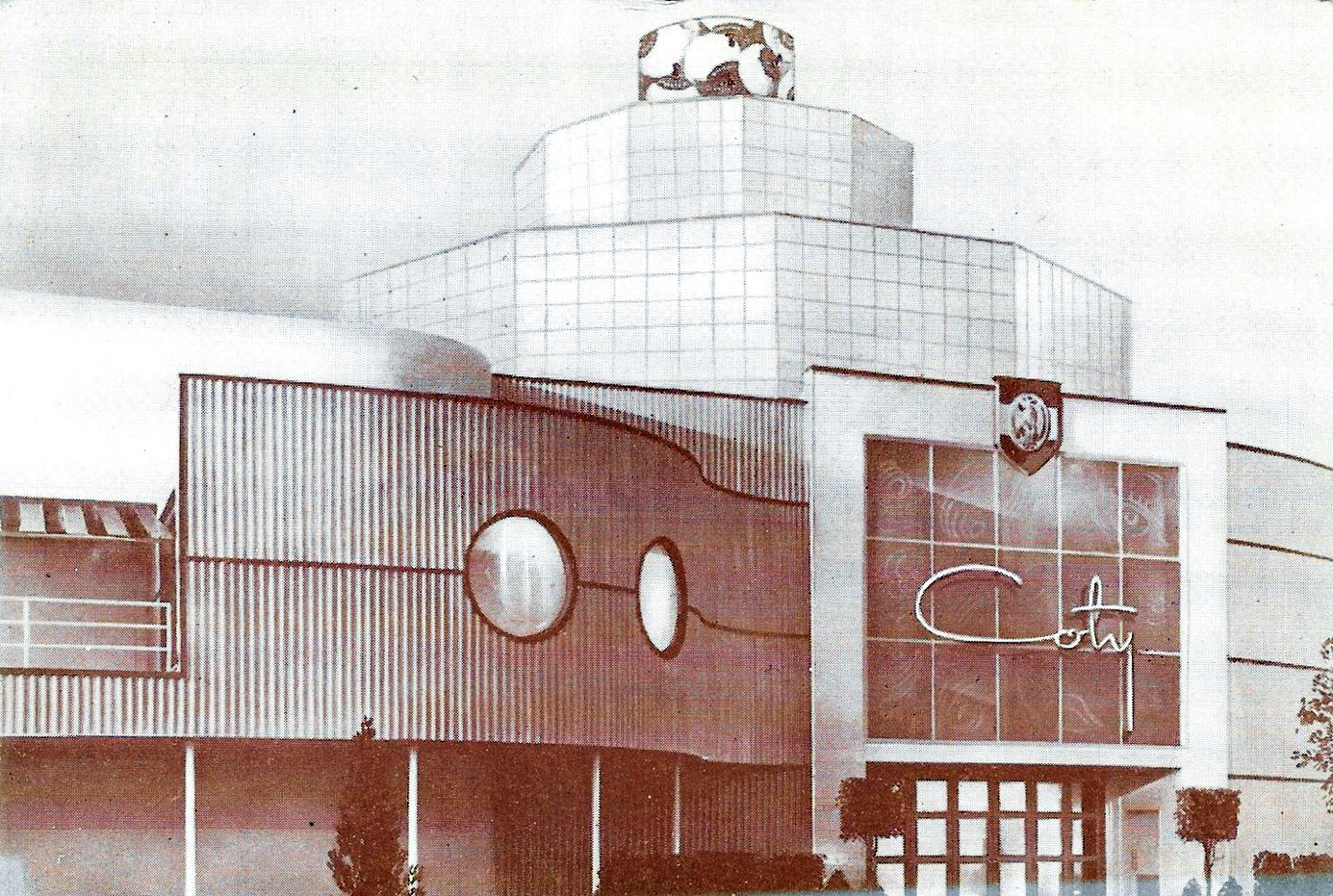
Coty Pavilion at the 1939 New York World's Fair

Coty's Air Spun face powder was launched in 1935. The powder has been described by Real Simple as one of the "best beauty products of all time" and remains mostly unchanged.

In the 1940s, Coty became a major supporter of the growing American fashion industry, launching the Coty American Fashion Critics' Awards to recognize and promote emerging American fashion designers. Coty discontinued its participation in 1985.

Coty became a key player in the American lipstick market with the launch of Coty 24 in 1955. By the 1960s, Coty had become a leading fragrance manufacturer and marketer and the largest fragrance company in the U.S. It attracted the attention of Pfizer, which acquired the company in 1963.

In 1991, the company had annual sales of approximately $280 million. Pfizer sold Coty to Joh. A. Benckiser (now known as JAB Holding Company) in 1992. Coty was a strategic fit for Benckiser, which had another beauty subsidiary, as well as an international distribution network through which it could market Coty's products. Coty's fragrances at the time included Emeraude, Exclamation, L'Effleur, Preferred Stock, Sand & Sable, Tribe, and Wild Musk. Peter Harf, chairman and CEO of JAB since 1988, was named Coty's CEO in 1993. Coty acquired Unilever's European cosmetic brands, including Rimmel, in 1996.

=== 2000s ===
During the mid-2000s, the company focused on marketing celebrity-endorsed fragrances, including David Beckham, Céline Dion, Jennifer Lopez, Mary-Kate and Ashley Olsen, Sarah Jessica Parker, and Shania Twain. Coty also expanded its portfolio of luxury fragrances. It purchased the fragrance license for fashion designer Marc Jacobs in 2003. The company's revenue increased from $1.9 billion to $2.1 billion during 2004–2005.

In 2005, Coty purchased additional licenses for Calvin Klein, Cerruti, Chloé, Lagerfeld, and Vera Wang from Unilever. These newest acquisitions, along with existing portfolio licenses including Adidas, Davidoff, and JOOP!, made Coty the largest global fragrance maker.

Coty acquired Del Laboratories' parent company, DLI Holding Corp., in 2007, adding the Sally Hansen and NYC New York Color brands to Coty's portfolio. The company entered into license agreements with Balenciaga in 2008 and Bottega Veneta in 2009.

=== 2010s ===
In 2010, Coty purchased nail polish maker OPI Products, as well as the skin care brand philosophy from The Carlyle Group. The company also entered into a license agreement with Miu Miu, a subsidiary of Prada.

Coty filed to go public in June 2012, and raised approximately $1 billion during its initial public offering (IPO) one year later. The IPO, held in 2013, was the third largest in the US at the time and the largest by a final goods company since Michael Kors. CNN Money described the offering as the "largest U.S.-listed IPO for a consumer products company". Coty acquired Bourjois in 2014.

During 2015–2016, Coty acquired 41 beauty brands from Procter & Gamble (collectively known as Galleria), including Clairol, CoverGirl, Gucci, Hugo Boss, Lacoste, Max Factor, and Wella. The agreement, completed as a Reverse Morris Trust, made Coty the third largest global seller of cosmetics. Coty also acquired the digital marketing technology agency Beamly in 2015.

The company entered into a license agreement with Tiffany & Co. in 2016. During 2016–2017, Coty acquired Hypermarcas' (now known as Hypera Pharma) beauty and personal care business, ghd, and became a majority stakeholder in the peer to peer digital beauty company Younique. Younique had approximately 80,000 sellers when Coty purchased a 60 percent stake in January 2017, and surpassed 230,000 sellers by December. Coty announced that it was cutting ties with Younique in August 2019, saying that Younique was "definitely different" from other businesses owned by Coty, and intended to sell its 60% stake in Younique back to its founders.

Coty acquired licenses to Burberry's cosmetics and fragrance brands in April 2017. In July, Coty added the skincare brand philosophy to Tmall, and launched other brands on the platform as well.

In December 2017, the Court of Justice of the European Union's European Court of Justice ruled that Coty did not violate competition laws by forbidding German distributor Parfümerie Akzente from selling products via Amazon, and that luxury brands are allowed to prohibit distributors from selling through third-party platforms. Previously, according to the United States House Committee on the Judiciary, Coty supported the Stop Online Piracy Act, a bill introduced to expand the ability of U.S. law enforcement to combat copyright infringement and counterfeit goods trafficking, in late 2011.

Coty developed "Let's Get Ready" for the Amazon Echo Show; the guide debuted in early 2018 and presents looks and products to users, which can be added to shopping carts. In February, Coty created a startup accelerator focused on artificial intelligence.

The company underwent refinancing of debt, including debt associated with Galleria, in March 2018.

In November 2019, Coty announced to purchase a $600 million stake (51%) in Kylie Cosmetics, the company of media personality and model Kylie Jenner. In June 2020, the company announced that it would buy a 20% stake for $200 million in KKW, a company owned by Jenner's sister Kim Kardashian West.

On December 1, 2020, Coty completed sale of Wella, Clairol, OPI and ghd brands stake to KKR for $2.5bn in cash whilst retaining 40% stake in the standalone company. On October 1, 2021, Coty announced that it would sell an approximate 9% stake in Wella to KKR for $426.5 million. The deal cuts Coty's stake in Wella, Clairol, OPI and ghd brands to around 30.6%.

== Environmental practices and social causes ==
Coty and its brands say they are committed to a range of social causes as well as seeking to minimize its environmental impact. The company has entered into a long-term partnership with the international advocacy group Global Citizen to tackle prejudice and discrimination based on gender, sexual orientation, disability, or ethnicity, and to promote self-expression. Coty has also joined other beauty companies to launch the Responsible Beauty Initiative to encourage sustainability within the industry. Coty has signed the United Nations Global Compact, a UN initiative to encourage businesses to adopt sustainable and socially responsible policies.

== Rankings ==
Coty ranked number 371 on the Fortune 500, Fortune magazine's annual list of the largest U.S. corporations by total revenue, in 2018. The company ranked number 5 on Women's Wear Daily's 2017 "Top 100" list of the world's largest beauty manufacturers, estimating $9.15 billion in sales. According to Advertising Age, Coty was one of the largest global advertisers in 2017. In 2018, Coty ranked number 1,196 on the Forbes Global 2000, an annual ranking of the top 2,000 public companies in the world. Additionally, Coty ranked number 396 on Forbes's 2018 list of "America's Largest Public Companies".

== See also ==
- Companies listed on the New York Stock Exchange (C)
- List of organizations with official stances on the SOPA and PIPA
