= Richard L. Gelb =

American businessman

- Born: Richard Lee Geib; June 8, 1924; New York City, United States
- Died: April 4, 2004 (aged 79)
- Occupation: Businessman

Richard Lee Gelb (June 8, 1924 – April 4, 2004) was an American businessman from New York City. He was a consultant and director of various corporations and not-for-profit entities. From 1960 to his retirement in 1995, he was a senior executive at the Bristol-Myers Squibb Company.

== Biography ==
Gelb was born in New York City, graduated from Phillips Andover, Yale University, and Harvard Business School, and lived most of his life in New York's Upper East Side.

He was former director of the New York Life Insurance Company, The New York Times Company, Bessemer Securities Corporation and Federal Reserve Bank of New York. He was Chairman Emeritus since 1995, chairman from 1976 to 1995, President from 1967 to 1976, chief executive officer from 1972 to 1993 and a Director since 1960, of the healthcare company Bristol-Myers Squibb.

Gelb died of cancer in 2004.

== Philanthropic work ==
Gelb was director emeritus of Lincoln Center for the Performing Arts, former director of the Council on Foreign Relations, former vice chairman of the Board of Overseers and Board of Managers of Memorial Sloan Kettering Cancer Center, a member of the board of directors of the Citizens Crime Commission of New York City and trustee emeritus of the New York Racing Association. He helped to found the New York City Police Foundation with Mayor John V. Lindsay. With his brother, Bruce, Gelb also ran the Lawrence M. Gelb Foundation, a family philanthropic foundation named for his father that supported education, cultural programs and hospitals.

== Publications ==
- Your Future in Beauty Culture, ISBN 9780823905058
