= Steinberg, Saxony =

Steinberg
- Municipality
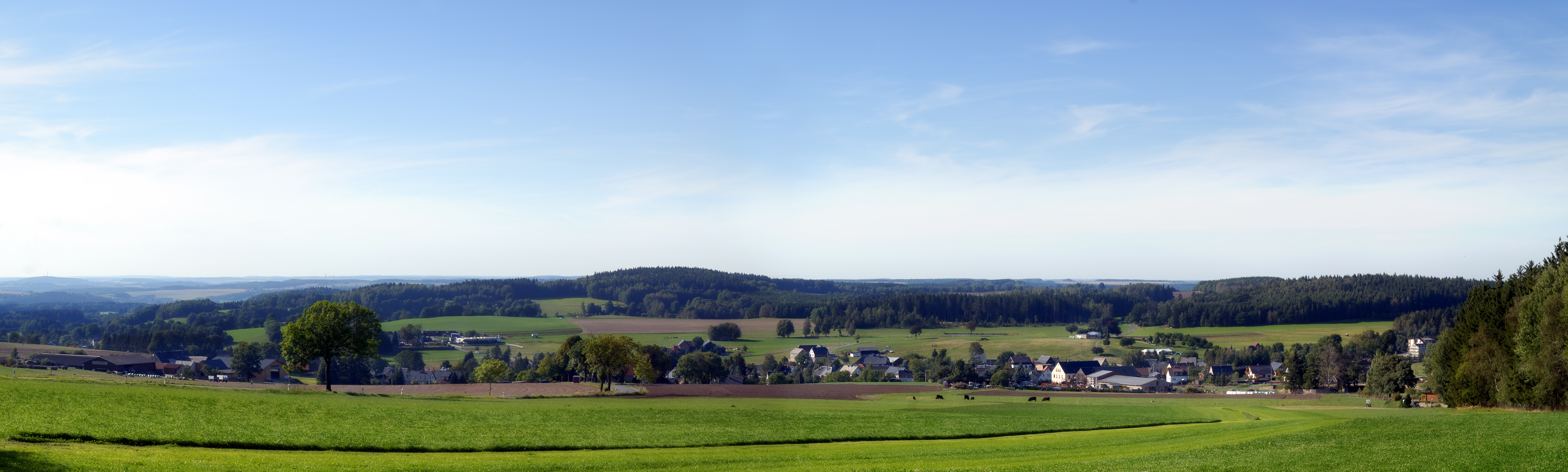
- Wildenau district of Steinberg

- Coat of arms

- Location of Steinberg within Vogtlandkreis district
- Interactive map of Steinberg
- Location within Germany Location within Saxony
- Coordinates: 50°32′20″N 12°28′40″E
- Country: Germany
- State: Saxony
- District: Vogtlandkreis
- Subdivisions: 3

Government
  - Mayor (2022–29): Andreas Gruner (CDU)

Area
  - Total: 20.37 km^{2} (7.86 sq mi)
- Elevation: 596 m (1,955 ft)

Population (2025-12-31)
  - Total: 2,625
  - Density: 128.9/km^{2} (333.8/sq mi)
- Time zone: UTC+01:00 (CET)
  - Summer (DST): UTC+02:00 (CEST)
- Postal codes: 08237
- Dialling codes: 037462
- Vehicle registration: V, AE, OVL, PL, RC
- Website: www.gemeinde-steinberg.de

Steinberg (German pronunciation: [ˈʃtaɪ̯nˌbɛʁk]) is a municipality in the Vogtland district, in Saxony, Germany. It was established in 1994 by the merger of the three villages Rothenkirchen, Wernesgrün and Wildenau and named after the nearby Steinberg (661 m (2,169 ft)), part of the Ore Mountains.

Wernesgrün is home of the Wernesgrüner brewery.
