= Franz Ströher =

German hairdresser and businessman

Franz Stroher
- Born: 21 February 1854; Oberwiesenthal, Saxpony, Germnany
- Died: 1936 (about 79-80); Germany
- Occupations: Hairdresser, company founder
- Known for: Founder of Wella

Franz Ströher (21 February 1854 in Oberwiesenthal – 1936 in Germany) was a German hairdresser and businessman.

== Biography ==
Franz Ströher worked as a hairdresser in Saxony. Germany

He founded the haircare company Wella in Germany was founded in 1880. The company Wella originally made tulles, the base used for making wigs. In 1890, Franz Ströher invented the Tullemoid Waterproof, a technique that allowed the scalp to breathe. In 1894, he opened his first factory in Rothenkirchen, Steinberg, Saxony. Franz Ströher was married and his sons Karl and George Ströher joined the business.

In 1924, the Ströhers registered the name Wella at the German patent office. As wigs and hairpieces fell out of fashion, the company turned to permanent wave products. In 1927, they introduced the first perming appliance and supplied it to salons.
