= Wella =

German hair care company

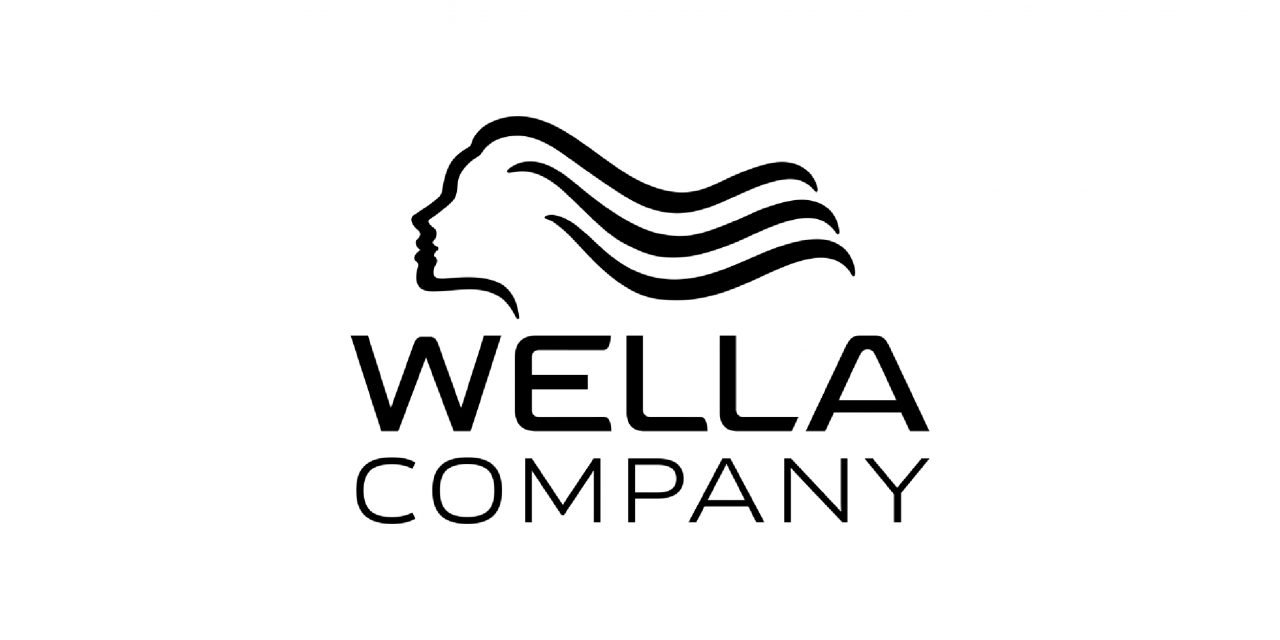
- Type: Private
- Industry: Beauty
- Founded: 1880; 146 years ago
- Founders: Franz Ströher
- Headquarters: Geneva, Switzerland
- Area served: Worldwide
- Products: Hair care, Hair color, styling tools, nail products
- Brands: Wella Professionals, ghd, OPI, Nioxin, Sebastian Professional, Clairol, and Briogeo
- Owner: KKR (74.1%); Coty (22.3%); IGF Wealth Management (3.6%)
- Website: www.wellacompany.com www.wellastore.com

Wella is a multinational hair care and cosmetics company headquartered in Geneva, Switzerland. It develops, manufactures, and distributes professional and consumer hair and nail products, including coloring, styling, and hair care lines. Founded in 1880 in Germany by Franz Ströher, the company has undergone multiple ownership transitions. Since 2020, it has operated as an independent entity, majority-owned by private equity firm KKR following its separation from Coty Inc.

As of 2025, Wella operates in over 150 countries and manages a portfolio of brands that includes Wella Professionals, ghd, OPI, Nioxin, Sebastian Professional, Clairol, and Briogeo.

== History ==
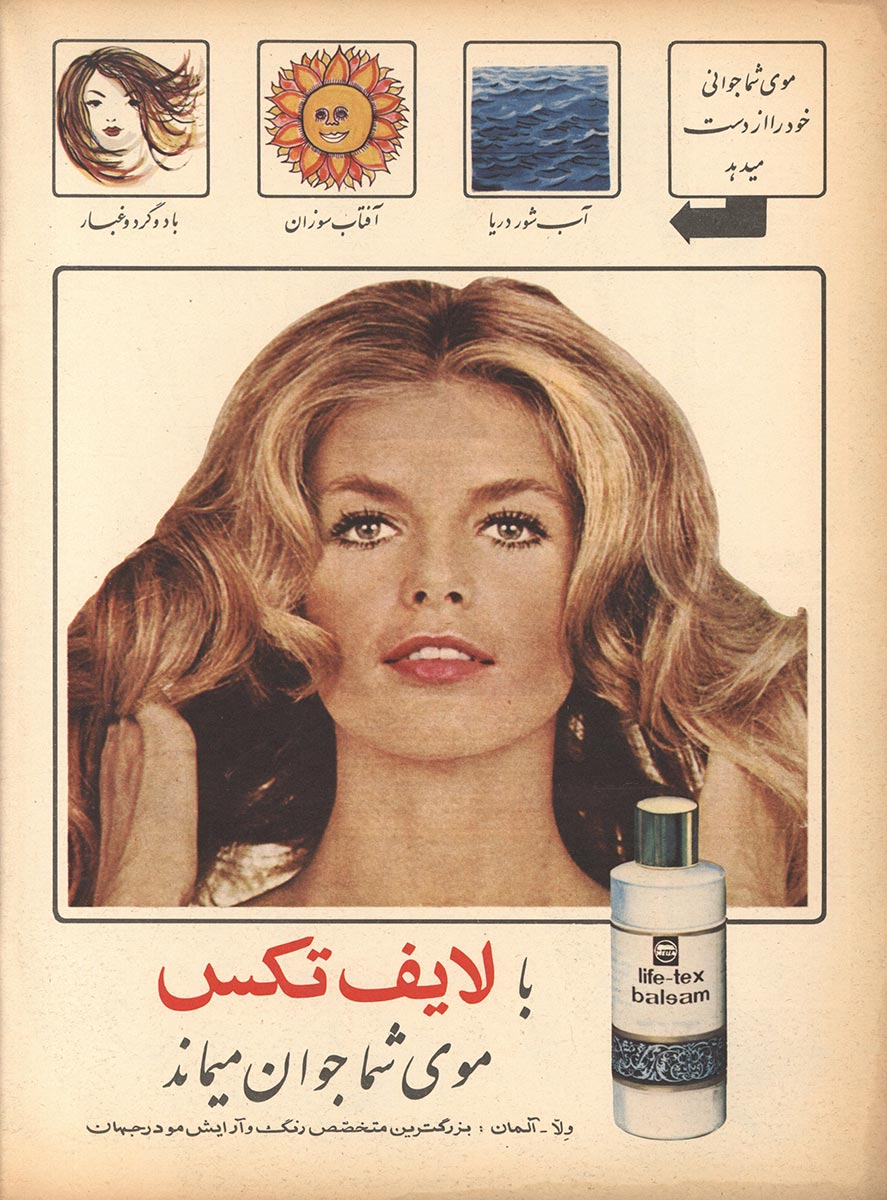
A 1971 Wella Magazine ad in Persian, Zan-e Rooz

=== Origins ===
Franz Ströher, a German hairdresser, founded Wella in 1880 in Rothenkirchen, Saxony, initially manufacturing tulle for wigs. As the demand for wigs declined, the company transitioned to producing permanent wave equipment and hair care products. The Wella trademark was officially registered in 1924.

=== Early history ===
During the Nazi era, Wella encountered material shortages and restrictions. The Apolda plant was repurposed during World War II to manufacture components for submarines. The Ströher family, known for its Freemason ties, was reportedly opposed to National Socialism. After the war, the Soviet administration dismantled the Apolda plant as part of war reparations. The Rothenkirchen site in East Germany was expropriated and operated as VEB Londa under state ownership. In West Germany, the Ströher family reestablished the business in Hünfeld in 1945–46 under the name Ondal GmbH, renaming it Wella AG in Darmstadt by 1950. The company expanded to other countries in subsequent decades. After German reunification in 1990, the Rothenkirchen plant was reintegrated into Wella through a joint venture.

=== Product Development ===
In 1950, Wella introduced Koleston, one of the first hair-colorant balms, and included Elizabeth Taylor in its 1954 advertising campaign. The 1960s saw the release of Wella Privat, a line allowing salon-quality products for home use. In 1972, Wella launched Wella Balsam shampoo and conditioner, later advertised using the cast of Charlie’s Angels.

Wella’s research and development headquarters are in Darmstadt, with test salons in Darmstadt, New York, and Tokyo. Product testing includes variable water qualities, such as water with high copper content, and machine hair brushing. Packaging is also tested for air pressure and leaks. Outside of laboratory work, Wella performs an estimated 37,000 treatments on 3,500 volunteers at test salons annually.

=== Modern History ===
Wella relaunched Koleston as Koleston Perfect in 1995 and introduced the TrendVision platform in 2002, which evolved into a hairdressing competition.

=== Acquisition by Procter & Gamble ===
In 2003, Procter & Gamble acquired a majority stake in Wella for approximately US $5.7 billion, incorporating it into its beauty division. Under P&G’s ownership, Wella continued to develop professional and consumer hair-care products, although it was eventually considered a non-core asset within the company’s broader portfolio.

In 2008, Josh Wood was appointed Global Colour Ambassador and later became Creative Director. Eugene Souleiman serves as Global Creative Director. In 2011, Wella launched Making Waves, a program providing hairdressing and life skills training in countries including Brazil, Romania, Cambodia, and Vietnam.

In 2014, Wella patented the ME+ molecule as a substitute for p-phenylenediamine (PPD) and para-toluenediamine (PTD), compounds known to cause allergic reactions. ME+ was initially used in Koleston Perfect Innosense and later adopted across the Koleston Perfect line.

=== Transition to Coty and KKR ===
In 2015, Coty Inc. acquired Wella as part of a US$12.5 billion deal involving Procter & Gamble’s specialty beauty business. Despite integration challenges, Wella remained a central brand in Coty’s professional hair segment. In 2015, Coty Inc. acquired Wella as part of a US$12.5 billion deal involving Procter & Gamble’s specialty beauty business. On October 1, 2021, Coty announced that it would sell an approximate 9% stake to KKR for $426.5 million. The deal reduces Coty's stake in the Wella, Clairol, OPI, and ghd brands to around 30.6%. Coty retained a minority stake, which was gradually reduced to approximately 22% by 2023 through a series of divestitures.

On November 8, 2021, Coty agreed to sell an approximate 4.7% stake in Wella to KKR in exchange for the redemption of approximately 56% of KKR's remaining convertible preferred shares in Coty. The deal reduces Coty's stake in Wella, Clairol, OPI and ghd to approximately 25.9%. KKR will continue to have a 2.4% ownership stake in Coty on an as-converted basis.

In April 2022, Wella announced it had acquired the eco-haircare brand, Briogeo, from Nancy Twine.

By 2023, Wella had marked its third year as an independent company, reporting high single-digit revenue growth and double-digit profitability. In 2025, Glenn K. Murphy was appointed as the company’s executive chair.

On July 18, 2023, Coty agreed to sell an approximate 3.6% stake in Wella to investment firm IGF Wealth Management for US$150 million. Coty will retain a 22.3% stake in Wella with an implied valuation of approximately $900 million.

Since becoming an independent company in 2020 under KKR ownership, Wella has reported consistent growth, with Wella Professionals cited among the top salon hair color brands across countries, and OPI noted for its strong presence in the professional nail care market, according to industry analyses.

In 2025, Wella's ghd Duet Style tool was given the Marie Claire Prix d’Excellence de la Beauté 2024 award for Beauty‑Tech Innovation category.

== Digital expansion ==
Wella Company official online distribution channel is Wellastore, a dedicated e-commerce platform designed to serve independent stylists and salon professionals.

Wellastore, enables professionals worldwide to purchase products from Wella’s portfolio of brands, including Wella Professionals, O·P·I, Sebastian Professional, Nioxin, System Professional and ghd. It supports business-to-business (B2B) customers with educational resources, product information, and localized regional sites across North America, Europe, Australia and New Zealand.

In 2022, Wella Company introduced the Wellastore App for iOS and Android, providing mobile access to ordering tools and professional resources such as a digital shade chart. In 2025, the app integrated InspoLab™, an AI-based consultation feature designed to help salon professionals conduct client consultations with confidence and achieve precise color results.

As of 2025, Wellastore operates in more than 20 markets, including the United States, Canada, the United Kingdom, France, Spain, Portugal, Australia, New Zealand, Italy, Greece, Germany, Austria, Switzerland, and Northern European countries.

== Rebranding and other ventures ==
In 2024, Wella-owned OPI partnered with the yet-to-be-released film Wicked on a limited-edition nail collection and named Cynthia Erivo, who stars as Elphaba, as its brand ambassador. In May 2025, Wella Professionals named Manushi Chhillar as its brand ambassador in India, aligning the announcement with its TrendVision event. In July of the same year, Wella announced sponsorship of MP Motorsport and its driver Joanne Ciconte, debuting at the Formula 1 Pirelli Grand Prix du Canada as part of the brand’s “Make It You” campaign and broader collaboration with the F1 Academy.

According to KKR's 2023 Sustainability Report, the company made progress in reducing plastic waste, sourcing materials more sustainably, and lowering its carbon emissions. In 2023, it reported advancements in its environmental, social, and governance (ESG) objectives alongside financial growth.

In 2025, Wella received a WorldStar Global Packaging Award from the World Packaging Organisation for its Wella Care Ultimate Bottle.
